= Crawley =

Town and borough in West Sussex, England

- Town and non-metropolitan district with borough status
- Borough of Crawley
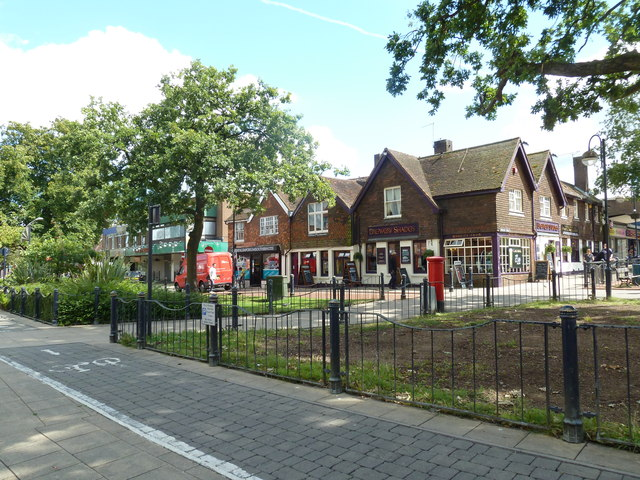
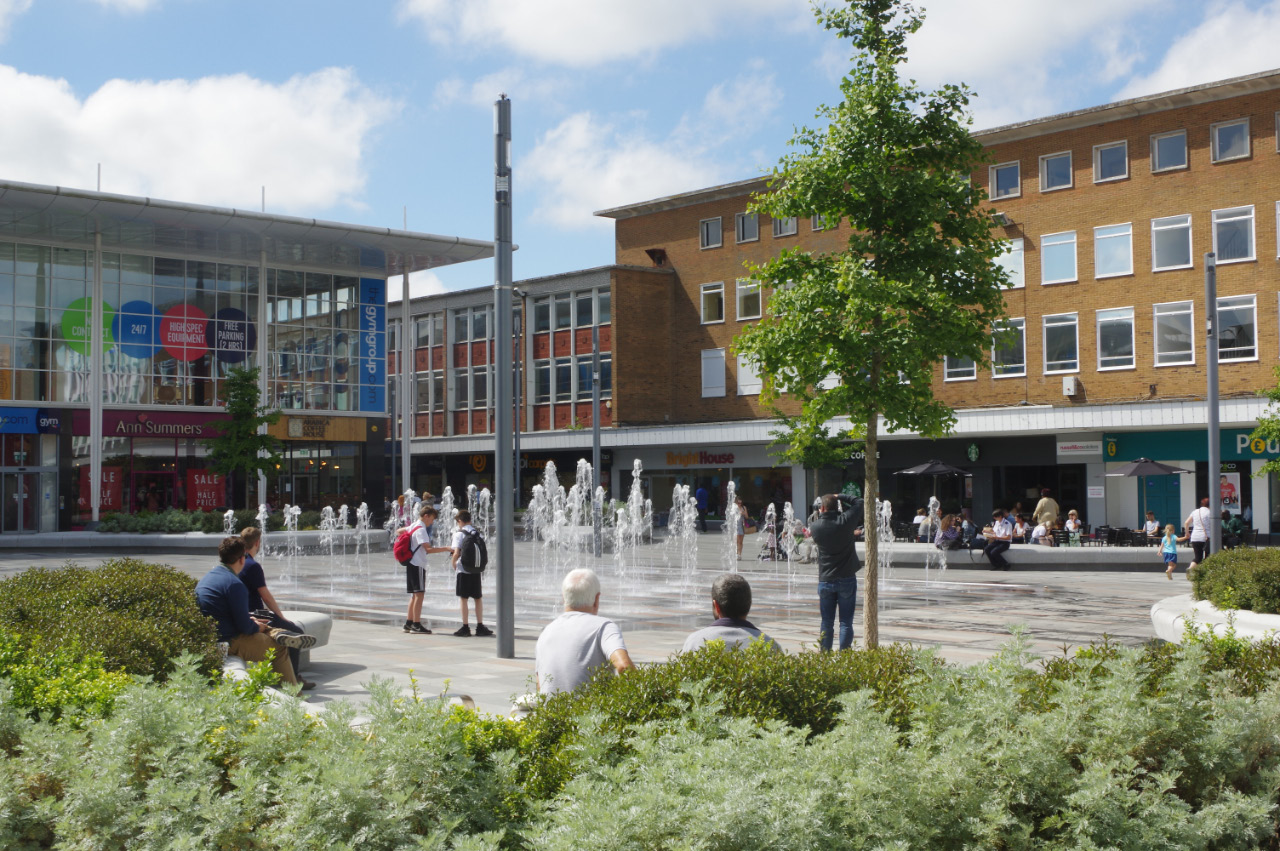
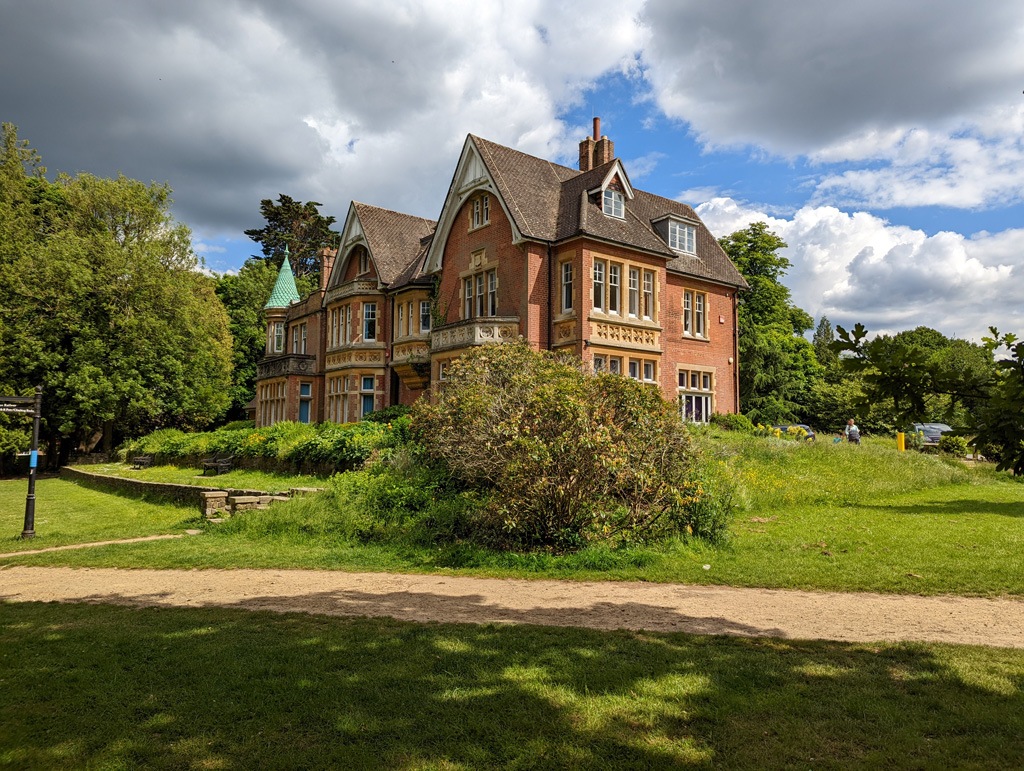
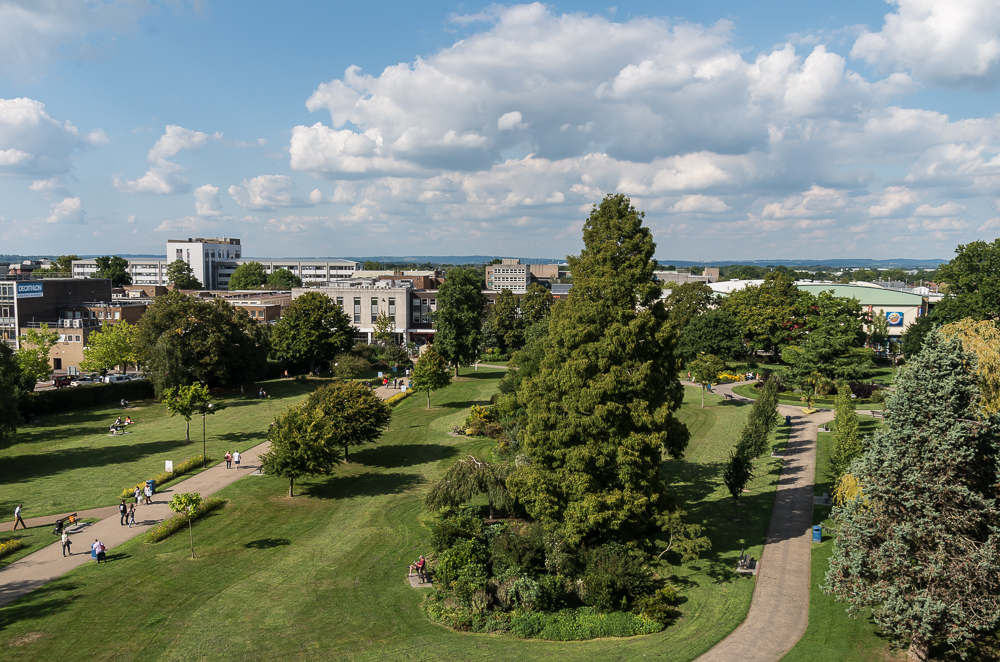
- The High Street, Queen's Square, Goff's Park House and the Memorial Gardens with the centre in the background

- Coat of Arms of the Borough Council
- Motto: "I Grow and I Rejoice"
- Location of Crawley within West Sussex
- Coordinates: 51°6′33″N 0°11′14″W
- Sovereign state: United Kingdom
- Constituent country: England
- Region: South East England
- Ceremonial county: West Sussex
- Historic county: Sussex (Town centre and outlying areas); Surrey (Gatwick Airport)
- Admin HQ: Crawley Town Hall
- Founded: 5th century
- Town charter: 1202; 824 years ago
- Borough status: 1974; 52 years ago

Government
  - Type: Borough
  - Body: Crawley Borough Council
  - Leadership: Leader and cabinet
  - Council Leader: Cllr Michael Jones (L)
  - Mayor: Cllr Sharmila Sivarajah (L)
  - MPs: Peter Lamb (L)

Area
  - Borough: 17.36 sq mi (44.96 km^{2})
- Elevation: 260 ft (80 m)

Population (2025)
  - Borough: 124,462 (ranked 199th)
  - Density: 5,750/sq mi (2,221/km^{2})

Ethnicity (2021)
  - Ethnic groups: List: 73.4% White; 15.4% Asian; 4.5% Black; 4.1% Mixed; 2.7% other

Religion (2021)
  - Religion: List: 42.6% Christianity; 35.1% no religion; 9.7% Islam; 5.7% not stated; 5.1% Hinduism; 0.7% Sikhism; 0.5% other; 0.4% Buddhism; 0.1% Judaism
- Time zone: UTC+0 (Greenwich Mean Time)
- Postcode: RH6 and RH10–11
- Area code: 01293
- ISO 3166-2: GB-WSX (West Sussex)
- ONS code: 45UE (ONS); E07000226 (GSS)
- OS grid reference: TQ268360
- NUTS 3: UKJ24
- Website: crawley.gov.uk

Crawley (/ˈkrɔːli/ KRAW-lee) is a town and non-metropolitan district with borough status in West Sussex, England. It is 28 miles (45 km) south of London, 18 miles (29 km) north of Brighton and Hove, and 32 miles (51 km) north-east of the county town of Chichester. Crawley covers an area of 17.36 square miles (44.96 km^{2}) and had a population of 118,493 at the time of the 2021 Census. Southern parts of the borough lie immediately next to the High Weald National Landscape.

The area has been inhabited since the Stone Age, and was a centre of ironworking in the Iron Age and Roman times. The area was probably used by the kings of Sussex for hunting. Initially a clearing in the vast forest of the Weald, Crawley began as a settlement on the boundary of two of the sub-regions particular to Sussex, known as Rapes, the Rape of Bramber and the Rape of Lewes. Becoming a market town in 1202, Crawley developed slowly, serving the surrounding villages in the Weald. In the medieval period, its location on the main road from London to the port of Shoreham helped the town to grow; and when Brighton became a fashionable seaside town in the 18th century, the passing trade encouraged the development of coaching inns. A rail link to London and Brighton opened in 1841, encouraging further development.

After World War II, the British Government planned to move large numbers of people and jobs out of London and into new towns around South East England. The New Towns Act 1946 (9 & 10 Geo. 6. c. 68) designated Crawley as the site of one of these. A master plan was developed for the establishment of new residential, commercial, industrial and civic areas, and rapid development greatly increased the size and population of the town over a few decades. The town expanded further in 1974 to include Gatwick Airport, Britain's second busiest international airport and, in 2024, the tenth busiest in Europe.

The town contains 14 residential neighbourhoods radiating out from the core of the old market town, and separated by main roads and railway lines. The nearby communities of Ifield, Pound Hill and Three Bridges were absorbed into the new town at various stages in its development. Established in 2019, the south-western suburb of Kilnwood Vale lies outside of the borough boundary in the neighbouring district of Horsham. Economically, the town has developed into the main centre of industry and employment between London and Brighton. Its large industrial area supports manufacturing and service companies, many of them connected with the airport. The commercial and retail sectors continue to expand. In the late 20th century and early 21st century, the town has attracted a diverse and multicultural population. It is home to about two-thirds of the UK's population of Chagossians.

== History ==
=== Origins ===
The area may have been settled during the Mesolithic period: locally manufactured flints of the Horsham Culture type have been found to the southwest of the town. Tools and burial mound from the Neolithic period, and burial mounds and a sword from the Bronze Age, have also been discovered. Crawley is on the western edge of the High Weald, which produced iron for more than 2,000 years from the Iron Age onwards. Goffs Park—now a recreational area in the south of the town—was the site of two late Iron Age furnaces. Ironworking and mineral extraction continued throughout Roman times, particularly in the Broadfield area where many furnaces were built.

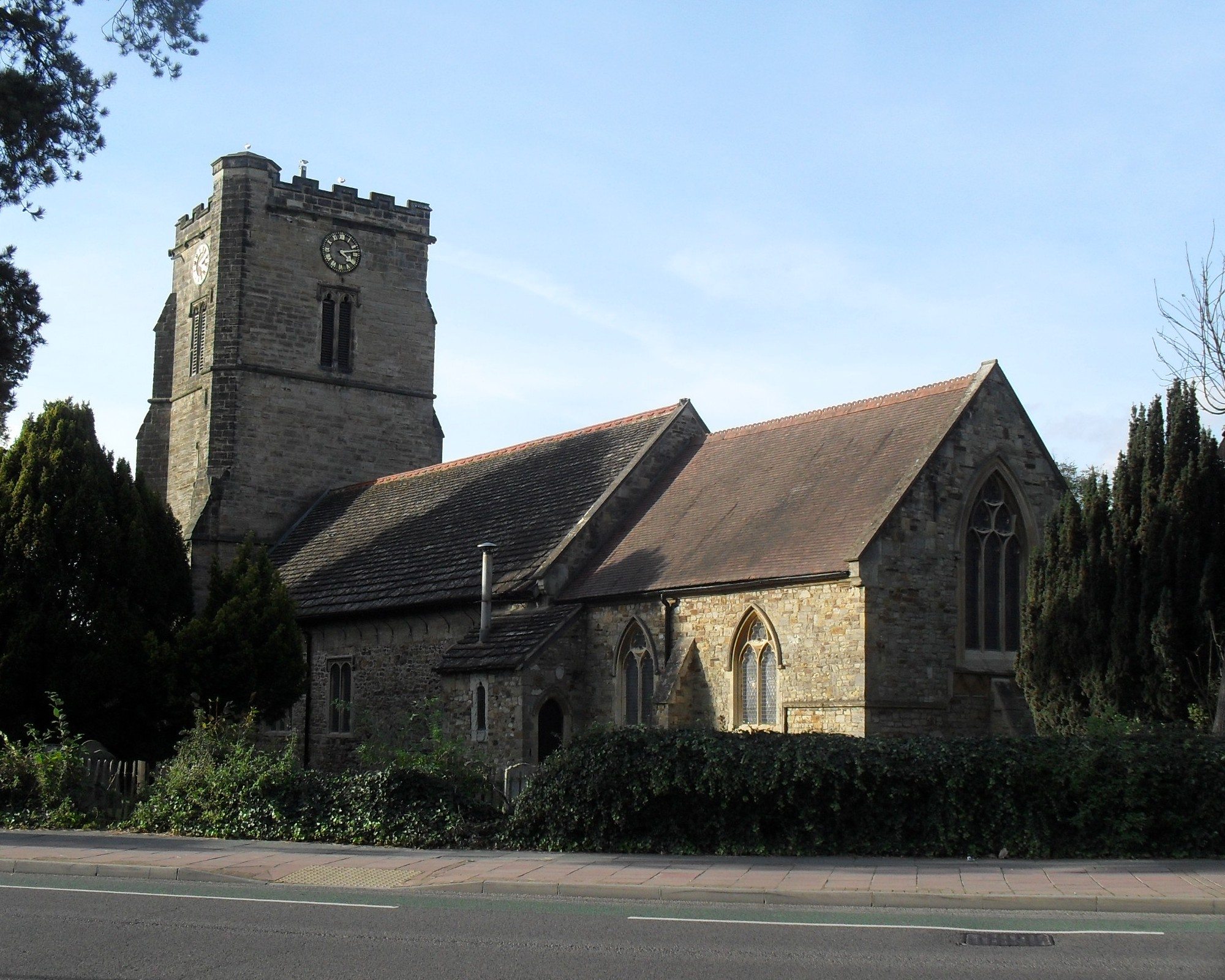
St John the Baptist's Church from the southeast

Passing through the north of the modern borough, the historic Sussex–Surrey border follows ridges and a trackway, in contrast to the Sussex–Kent border to the east, which follows waterways. According to Mark Gardiner, the border dates at least as far back as the Saxon period, although may in fact be earlier and represent the border between Roman cantons or Iron Age kingdoms. In the 5th century, Saxon settlers named the area Crow's Leah—meaning a crow-infested clearing, or Crow's Wood. This name evolved over time, and the present spelling appeared by the early 14th century. By this time, nearby settlements were more established: the Saxon church at Worth, for example, dates from between 950 and 1050 AD.

Although Crawley itself is not mentioned in the Domesday Book of 1086, the nearby settlements of Ifield and Worth are recorded. Crawley's High Street was built on part of the route from London to the port of New Shoreham, a major port in the 12th and 13th centuries that was on the most direct route between London and Normandy, used by the king and his knights and soldiers. The first written record of Crawley dates from 1202, when King John issued a licence for a weekly market on Wednesdays. As a small market town, Crawley grew slowly in importance over the next few centuries and as the Wealden iron industry declined, the town became an important centre for smuggling between the Sussex coast and London. Later in the 18th century, Crawley was boosted by the construction of the turnpike road between London and Brighton. When this was completed in 1770, travel between the newly fashionable seaside resort of Brighton and London became safer and quicker, and Crawley (located approximately halfway between the two) prospered as a coaching halt. By 1839 it offered almost an hourly service to both destinations. The George, a timber-framed house dating from the 15th century, expanded to become a large coaching inn, taking over adjacent buildings. Eventually an annexe had to be built in the middle of the wide High Street; this survived until the 1930s. The original building has become the George Hotel, with conference facilities and 84 bedrooms; it retains many period features including an iron fireback.

Crawley's oldest church is St John the Baptist's, between the High Street and the Broadway. It is said to have 13th-century origins, but there has been much rebuilding (especially in the 19th century) and the oldest part remaining is the south wall of the nave, which is believed to be 14th century. The church has a 15th-century tower (rebuilt in 1804) which originally contained four bells cast in 1724. Two were replaced by Thomas Lester of London in 1742; but in 1880 a new set of eight bells were cast and installed by the Croydon-based firm Gillett, Bland & Company.

=== Railway age and Victorian era ===
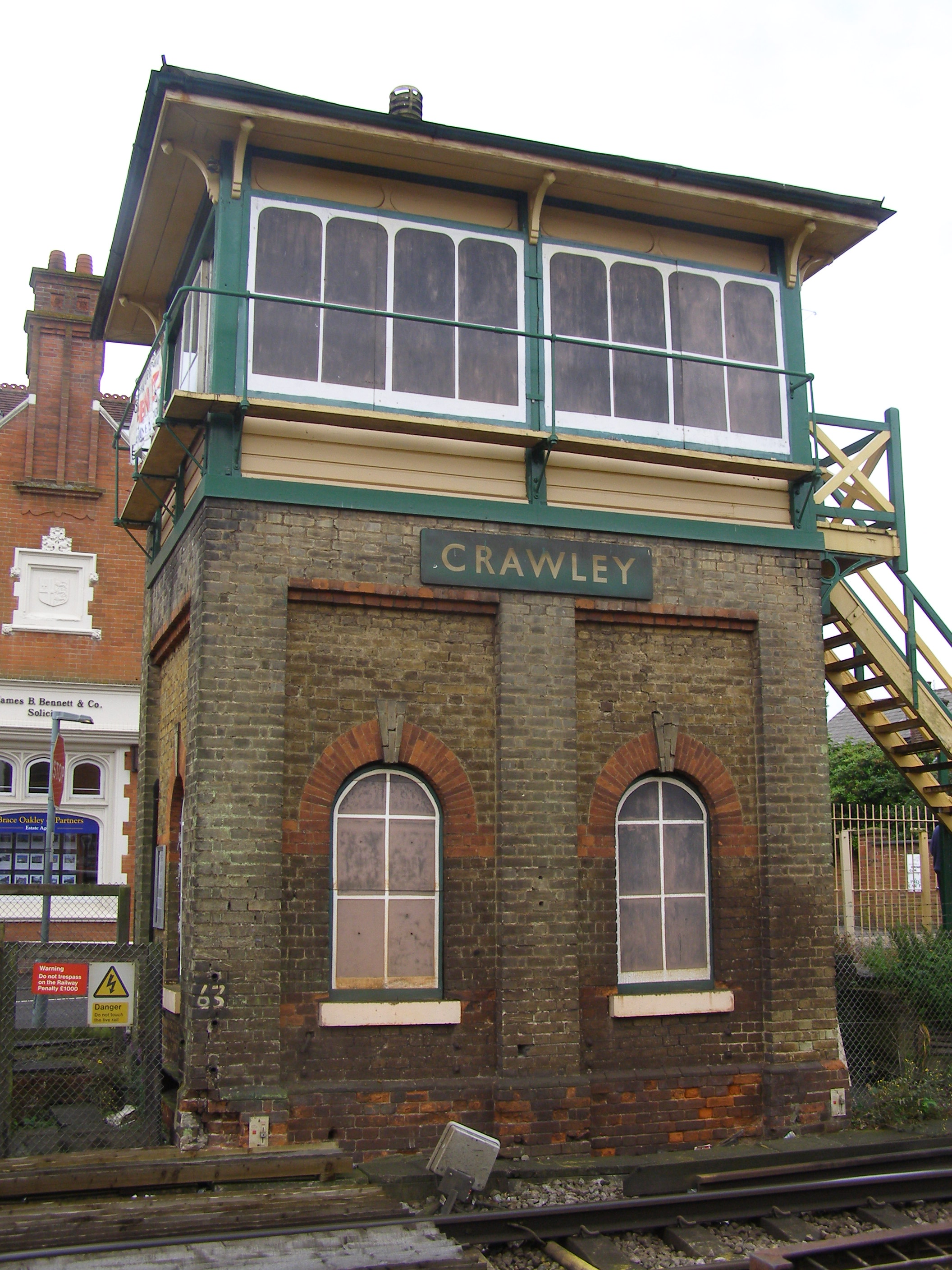
Crawley signal box in 2008

The Brighton Main Line was the first railway line to serve the Crawley area. A station was opened at Three Bridges (originally known as East Crawley) in the summer of 1841. Crawley railway station, at the southern end of the High Street, was built in 1848 when the Horsham branch was opened from Three Bridges to Horsham. A line was built eastwards from Three Bridges to East Grinstead in 1855. The village of Three Bridges had become the hub of transport in the area by this stage: one-quarter of its population was employed in railway jobs by 1861, mainly at the London, Brighton and South Coast Railway's railway works near the station. The Longley company—one of South East England's largest building firms in the late 19th century, responsible for buildings including Christ's Hospital school and King Edward VII Sanatorium in Midhurst—moved to a site next to Crawley station in 1881. In 1898 more than 700 people were employed at the site.

There was a major expansion in house building in the late 19th century. An area known as "New Town" (unrelated to the postwar developments) was created around the railway level crossing and down the Brighton Road; the West Green area, west of the High Street on the way to Ifield, was built up; and housing spread south of the Horsham line for the first time, into what is now Southgate. The population reached 4,433 in 1901, compared to 1,357 a century earlier. In 1891, a racecourse was opened on farmland at Gatwick, to the north of Crawley. Built to replace a steeplechase course at Waddon near Croydon in Surrey, it was used for both steeplechase and flat racing, and held the Grand National during the years of World War I. The course had its own railway station on the Brighton Main Line.

In the early 20th century, many of the large country estates in the area, with their mansions and associated grounds and outbuildings, were split up into smaller plots of land, attracting haphazard housing development and small farms. By the outbreak of World War I in 1914 Crawley had grown into a small but prosperous town, serving a wide rural area and those passing through on the London–Brighton road (the present A23). Three-quarters of the population had piped water supplies, all businesses and homes had electricity, and piped gas and street lighting had been in place for 50 years. An airfield was opened in 1930 on land near the racecourse. This was a private concern until the Second World War when it was claimed by the Royal Air Force.

=== New Town ===
In May 1946, the New Towns Act of 1946 identified Crawley as a suitable location for a New Town; but it was not officially designated as such until 9 January 1947. The 5,920 acres (2,396 ha) of land set aside for the new town were split across the county borders between East Sussex, West Sussex and Surrey. Architect Thomas Bennett was appointed chairman of Crawley Development Corporation. Members of the working group developing a master plan included Lawrence Neal, Alwyn Sheppard Fidler, Caroline Haslett, Molly Bolton, Sir Edward Gillett, Eric Walter Pasold and Alderman James Marshall. A court challenge to the designation order meant that plans were not officially confirmed until December 1947. By this time, an initial plan for the development of the area had been drawn up by Anthony Minoprio. This proposed filling in the gaps between the villages of Crawley, Ifield and Three Bridges. Bennett estimated that planning, designing and building the town, and increasing its population from the existing 9,500 to 40,000, would take 15 years.

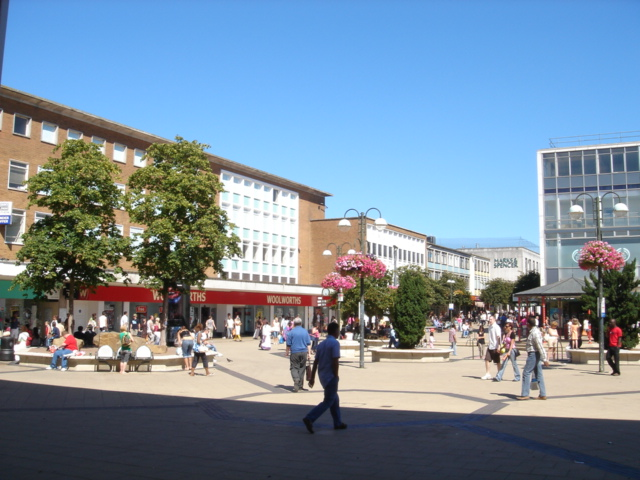
Queen's Square in the central shopping area, looking towards the bandstand, The Body Shop, Marks & Spencer and the former Woolworths store

Work began almost immediately to prepare for the expansion of the town. A full master plan was in place by 1949. This envisaged an increase in the population of the town to 50,000, residential properties in nine neighbourhoods radiating from the town centre, and a separate industrial area to the north. The neighbourhoods would consist mainly of three-bedroom family homes, with a number of smaller and larger properties. Each would be built around a centre with shops, a church, a pub, a primary school and a community centre. Secondary education was to be provided at campuses at Ifield Green, Three Bridges and Tilgate. Later, a fourth campus, in Southgate, was added to the plans.

At first, little development took place in the town centre, and residents relied on the shops and services in the existing high street. The earliest progress was in West Green, where new residents moved in during the late 1940s. In 1950 the town was visited by the then heir to the throne, Princess Elizabeth, when she officially opened the Manor Royal industrial area. Building work continued throughout the 1950s in West Green, Northgate and Three Bridges, and later in Langley Green, Pound Hill and Ifield. In 1956, land at "Tilgate East" was allocated for housing use, eventually becoming the new neighbourhood of Furnace Green. From the mid-1950s, expanded shopping facilities to the east of the existing High Street were provided. The first stage to open was The Broadwalk in 1954, followed by the opening of the Queen's Square development by the recently crowned Queen Elizabeth II in 1958. Crawley railway station was moved eastwards towards the new development.

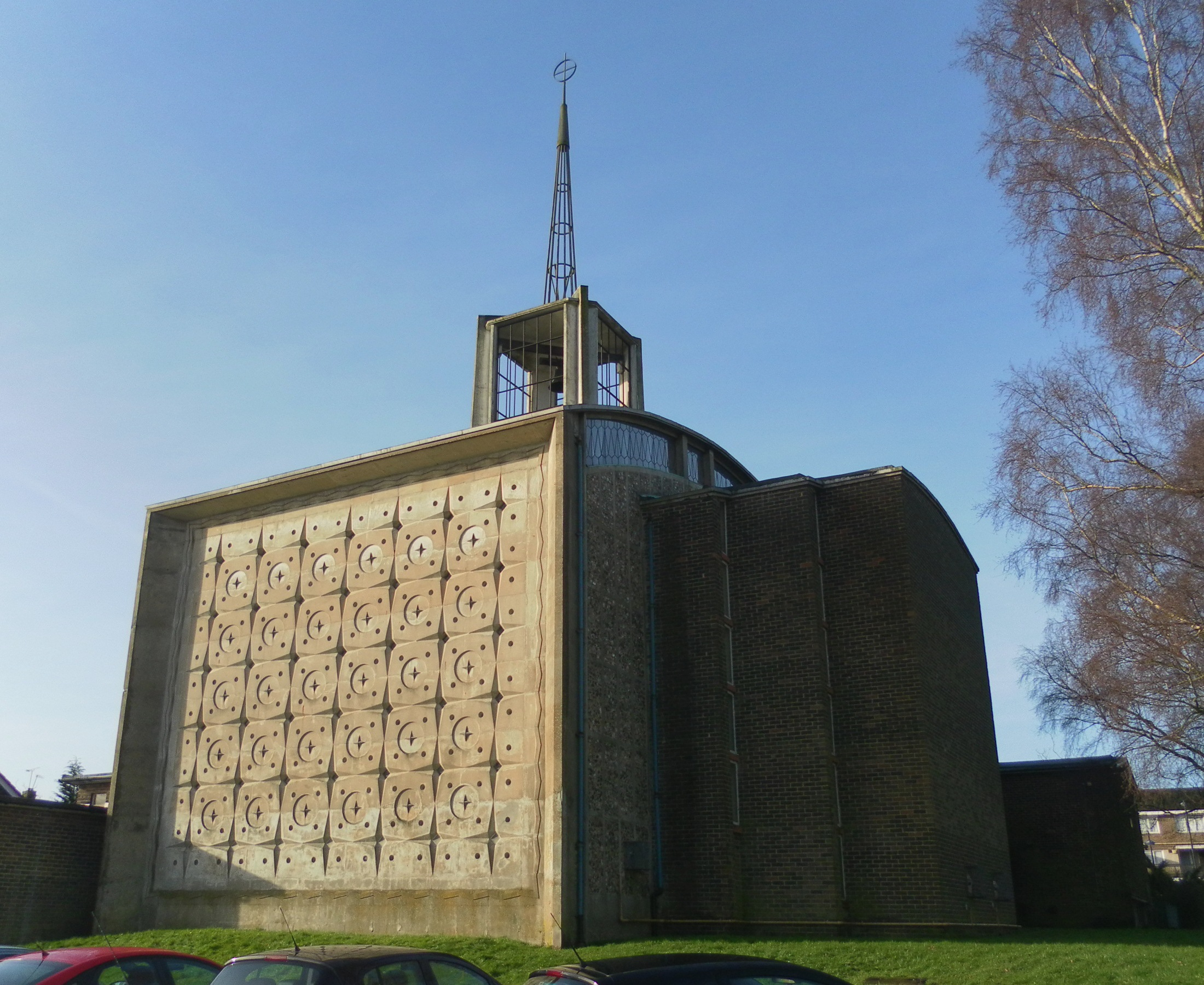
One of the neighbourhood churches: St Mary's in Southgate (now a locally listed building)

Expectations of the eventual population of the town were revised upwards several times. The 1949 master plan had allowed for 50,000 people, but this was amended to 55,000 in 1956 after the Development Corporation had successfully resisted pressure from the Minister for Town and Country Planning to accommodate 60,000. Nevertheless, plans dated 1961 anticipated growth to 70,000 by 1980, and by 1969 consideration was given to an eventual expansion of up to 120,000. By April 1960, when Thomas Bennett made his last presentation as chairman of the Development Corporation, the town's population had reached 51,700; 2,289,000 square feet (212,700 m^{2}) of the factory and other industrial space had been provided; 21,800 people were employed, nearly 60% of whom worked in manufacturing industries, and only seventy people were registered as unemployed. The corporation had built 10,254 houses, and private builders provided around 1,500 more. Tenants were by then permitted to buy their houses and 440 householders had chosen to do so by April 1960.

A new plan was put forward by West Sussex County Council in 1961. This proposed new neighbourhoods at Broadfield and Bewbush, both of which extended outside the administrative area of the then Urban District Council. Detailed plans were made for Broadfield in the late 1960s; by the early 1970s building work had begun. Further expansion at Bewbush was begun in 1974, although development there was slow. The two neighbourhoods were both larger than the original nine: together, their proposed population was 23,000. Work also took place in the area now known as Ifield West on the western fringes of the town.

By 1980, the council identified land at Maidenbower, south of the Pound Hill neighbourhood, as being suitable for another new neighbourhood, and work began in 1986. However, all of this development was undertaken privately, unlike the earlier neighbourhoods in which most of the housing was owned by the council. In 1999, plans were announced to develop the fourteenth neighbourhood on land at Tinsley Green to the northeast of the town; this was given the go-ahead in 2011 and has been named Forge Wood after the ancient woodland that is enclosed within the development. After the proposals were temporarily halted while a possible expansion at Gatwick Airport was announced, construction started in 2015. Forge Wood is to have a maximum of 1,900 homes. Another major residential development, Kilnwood Vale, began in 2012 adjacent to the western side of Crawley but separate from it, in district of Horsham. A plan for a new railway station fell through.

== Governance ==
=== Local government ===
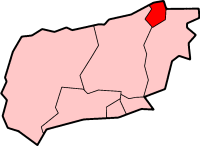
Borough of Crawley shown within West Sussex

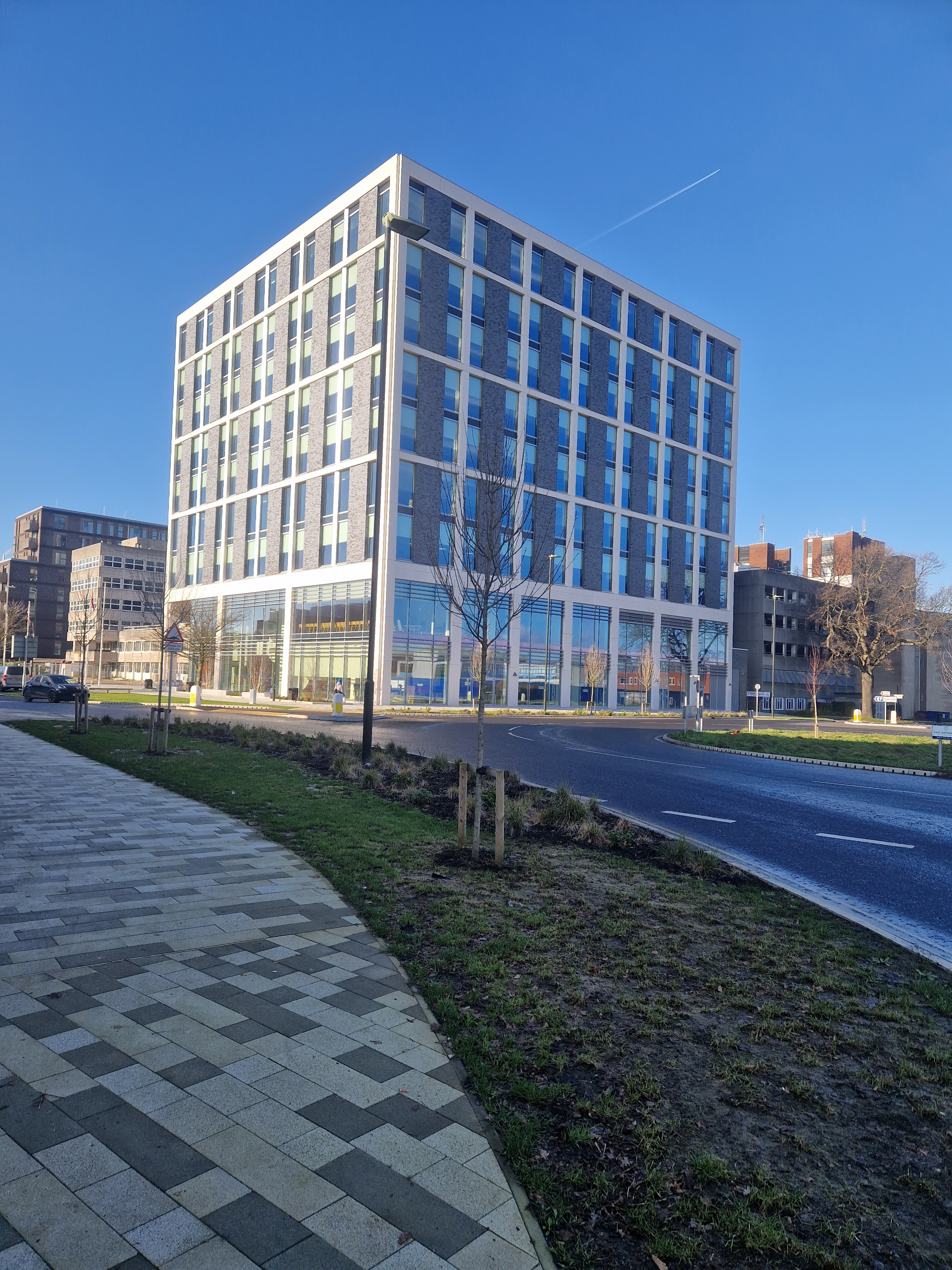
Crawley Town Hall, on The Boulevard in the town centre

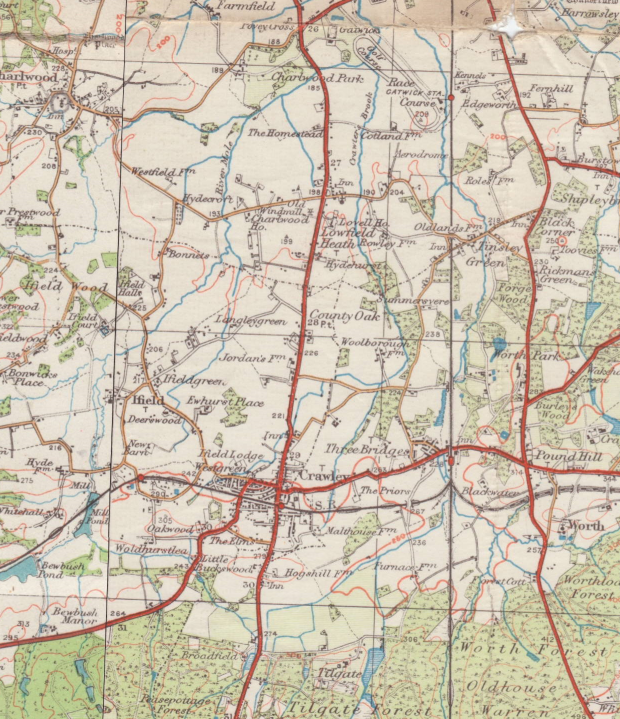
Ordnance Survey map of the Crawley area, 1932

The borough is part of a two-tier arrangement, with service provision shared with West Sussex County Council. Since 2018 the borough has partnered with other local authorities as part of the Greater Brighton City Region. The authority is divided into 13 wards, each of which is represented by two or three local councillors, forming a total council of 36 members. Most wards are coterminous with the borough's neighbourhoods, but Northgate and West Green are combined into one ward; Broadfield is divided across three; and Pound Hill is split across "Pound Hill North and Forge Wood" and "Pound Hill South and Worth". The council is elected in thirds. Crawley Borough Council has had a Labour majority since 2022.

Crawley became a parish in the 16th century, having previously been a chapelry in the parish of Slaugham. Crawley's position straddling the Rapes of Bramber and Lewes, with the High Street, London Road and Brighton Road forming the boundary, led to the town being divided, falling under the administration of both East Sussex County Council and West Sussex County Council when administrative counties were first formed in 1889. When district and parish councils were established under the Local Government Act 1894, Crawley was given a parish council; it was included in the Horsham Rural district and was administered by West Sussex County Council. The parish was significantly enlarged in 1933, when it absorbed the neighbouring parish of Ifield.

Following the designation as a New Town in 1947, the parish of Crawley was enlarged in 1953 to take in territory to the east, from the parishes of Slaugham and Worth. Three years later, on 1 April 1956, the parish of Crawley was made an urban district, making it independent from Horsham Rural district. The Local Government Act 1972 led to the district being reformed as a borough in April 1974, gaining a mayor for the first time. The new borough in 1974 also saw its boundaries enlarged, gaining other areas which had been included in the designated area of the New Town as well as the area north of the town including Gatwick Airport, which had previously been in Surrey.

The Urban district council received its coat of arms from the College of Arms in 1957. After the change to borough status a modified coat of arms, based on the original, was awarded in 1976 and presented to the council on 24 March 1977. It features a central cross on a shield, representing the town's location at the meeting point of north–south and east–west roads. The shield bears nine martlets representing both the county of Sussex and the new town's original nine neighbourhoods. Supporters, of an eagle and a winged lion, relate to the significance of the airport to the locality. The motto featured is I Grow and I Rejoice—a translation of a phrase from the Epistulae of Seneca the Younger. Despite a petition to save it, the old Crawley Town Hall, which was built in 1964, was demolished in 2020 and a new Crawley Town Hall was completed in 2023.

Initially, the district (and then borough) council worked with the Commission for New Towns on many aspects of development; but in 1978 many of the commission's assets, such as housing and parks, were surrendered to the council. The authority's boundaries were extended in 1983 to accommodate the Bewbush and Broadfield neighbourhoods.

=== United Kingdom government ===
Crawley has had its own MP since 1983, and the parliamentary constituency of Crawley shares the same boundaries as the borough. Peter Lamb of the Labour Party won the seat at the 2024 general election, replacing Conservative Henry Smith who was MP from 2010 to 2024. Previously, Laura Moffatt, a member of the Labour Party, had been the MP for Crawley from 1997 to 2010; she was the Parliamentary private secretary to the Secretary of State for Health, Alan Johnson. In the 2005 general election, the winning margin was the slimmest of any UK constituency: Moffatt won by just 37 votes.

Two immigration detention centres–Brook House and Tinsley House–are situated within the grounds of Gatwick Airport in Crawley.

== Geography ==
At 51°6′33″N 0°11′14″W (51.1092, −0.1872), Crawley is in the north-east of West Sussex in South East England, 28 miles (45 km) south of London and 18 miles (29 km) north of Brighton and Hove. The borough of Crawley is bordered by the districts of Mid Sussex and Horsham in West Sussex as well as the districts of Mole Valley and Tandridge and the borough of Reigate and Banstead in Surrey. Nearby towns include Horsham, Haywards Heath, Burgess Hill and East Grinstead as well as the Surrey towns of Horley, Redhill, Reigate, Oxted and Dorking.

Crawley lies in the Low Weald, on the edge of the High Weald between the North and South Downs. The town centre lies on a gentle slope 67 metres (220 ft) above sea level where the High Street meets Kilnmead, rising to 77 metres (253 ft) above sea level where the High Street meets the railway line. The highest point in the borough is 148 metres (486 ft) above sea level. This forms part of the Forest Ridge of the High Weald, which extends eastwards through the north of Sussex into Tunbridge Wells and Cranbrook in Kent. Two beds of sedimentary rock meet beneath the town: the eastern neighbourhoods and the town centre lie largely on the sandstone Hastings Beds, while the rest of the town is based on Weald Clay. A geological fault running from east to west has left an area of Weald Clay (with a ridge of limestone) jutting into the Hastings Beds around Tilgate. The town has no major waterways, although the River Mole rises near Rusper. meeting the Ifield Stream in the north of Crawley, and the Gatwick Stream near Gatwick Airport, before continuing northwards to the River Thames at Hampton Court Palace. There are several lakes at Tilgate Park and a mill pond at Ifield which was stopped to feed the Ifield Water Mill. To the south-west of the town lies St Leonard's Forest, including Buchan Country Park; to the south-east is Tilgate Forest, originally part of Worth Forest. This area forms part of the Weald to Waves wildlife corridor, providing a key link between Knepp Wildland and Ashdown Forest, which connects further to coast via the Rivers Adur, Arun and Ouse.

In 1822 Gideon Mantell, an amateur fossil collector and palaeontologist, discovered teeth, bones and other remains of what he described as "an animal of the lizard tribe of enormous magnitude", in Tilgate Forest on the edge of Crawley. He announced his discovery in an 1825 scientific paper, giving the creature the name Iguanodon. In 1832 he discovered and named the Hylaeosaurus genus of dinosaurs after finding a fossil in the same forest.

=== Climate ===
Crawley has a temperate climate: its Köppen climate classification is Cfb. The nearest Met Office weather station is at Charlwood, directly northwest of Gatwick Airport. For the period 1991–2020 this weather station recorded average annual maximum and minimum temperatures of 15.09 °C (59.16 °F) and 6.12 °C (43.02 °F) respectively—a greater range than for southeastern and central southern England as a whole (14.7 °C (58.5 °F) and 6.58 °C (43.84 °F) respectively) and somewhat higher than the equivalent averages for the United Kingdom as a whole 12.79 °C (55.02 °F) and 5.53 °C (41.95 °F) respectively). Total sunshine hours, 1,628.44, and rainfall, 833.69 millimetres (32.822 in), at Charlwood compared unfavourably to the regional averages of 1,670.78 and 805.99 millimetres (31.732 in) respectively, but the United Kingdom averages of 1,402.61 hours and 1,162.70 millimetres (45.776 in) respectively indicate that Crawley is much sunnier and drier on average.

Generally, Crawley's inland and southerly position within the United Kingdom means temperatures in summer are amongst the highest in the British Isles. Charlwood recorded 36.3 °C (97.3 °F) and Gatwick recording 36.4C (97.5F) on 19 July 2006, just 0.2 °C (32.4 °F) and 0.1 °C (32.2 °F) lower, respectively, than the UK monthly record for that day set at Wisley, 20 miles (32 km) to the west. The overall maximum stands at 36.5 °C (97.7 °F) at Charlwood, set on 10 August 2003. The absolute record for Gatwick Airport is 36.4 °C (97.5 °F) Before this, the highest temperature recorded there was 35.6 °C (96.1 °F) also in August 2003. In the period 1971–2000 the maximum temperature was 25.1 °C (77.2 °F) or higher on 15.9 days of the year on average, and the warmest day typically rose to 29.4 °C (84.9 °F).

The overall minimum for Gatwick Airport for the period from 1960 was −16.7 °C (1.9 °F), set in January 1963. More recently, Charlwood fell to −11.2 °C (11.8 °F), and Gatwick to −11.1 °C (12.0 °F), on 20 December 2010. Typically the coldest night at Gatwick will fall to −8.9 °C (16.0 °F). Across the period 1971–2000, air frost was recorded on 58.2 nights per year at Gatwick on average, and 1 millimetre (0.039 in) of rain or more fell on 116.7 days of the year on average.

Climate data for Gatwick, elevation 62 metres (203 ft), 1971–2000, Sunshine 1961–1990, extremes 1960–date
Month	Jan	Feb	Mar	Apr	May	Jun	Jul	Aug	Sep	Oct	Nov	Dec	Year
Record high °C (°F)	14.0 (57.2)	17.0 (62.6)	22.2 (72.0)	24.5 (76.1)	30.0 (86.0)	33.8 (92.8)	36.4 (97.5)	35.6 (96.1)	31.6 (88.9)	24.7 (76.5)	18.3 (64.9)	15.2 (59.4)	36.4 (97.5)
Mean daily maximum °C (°F)	7.3 (45.1)	7.6 (45.7)	10.4 (50.7)	12.8 (55.0)	16.7 (62.1)	19.5 (67.1)	22.2 (72.0)	22.1 (71.8)	18.9 (66.0)	14.8 (58.6)	10.5 (50.9)	8.2 (46.8)	14.3 (57.7)
Mean daily minimum °C (°F)	1.1 (34.0)	0.8 (33.4)	2.3 (36.1)	3.7 (38.7)	6.8 (44.2)	9.6 (49.3)	11.9 (53.4)	11.5 (52.7)	9.2 (48.6)	6.5 (43.7)	3.2 (37.8)	2.0 (35.6)	5.8 (42.4)
Record low °C (°F)	−16.7 (1.9)	−14.5 (5.9)	−11.3 (11.7)	−5.7 (21.7)	−4 (25)	−1.6 (29.1)	2.8 (37.0)	1.6 (34.9)	−0.7 (30.7)	−4.7 (23.5)	−8.6 (16.5)	−12 (10)	−16.7 (1.9)
Average precipitation mm (inches)	83.85 (3.30)	51.84 (2.04)	59.89 (2.36)	50.84 (2.00)	49.30 (1.94)	58.80 (2.31)	42.36 (1.67)	52.66 (2.07)	65.29 (2.57)	82.14 (3.23)	78.86 (3.10)	84.36 (3.32)	746.97 (29.41)
Mean monthly sunshine hours	52.4	71.3	113.4	153.0	204.3	204.3	204.5	195.3	148.1	110.5	69.3	47.8	1,574.2
Source 1: YR.NO
Source 2: NOAA

=== Neighbourhoods and areas ===
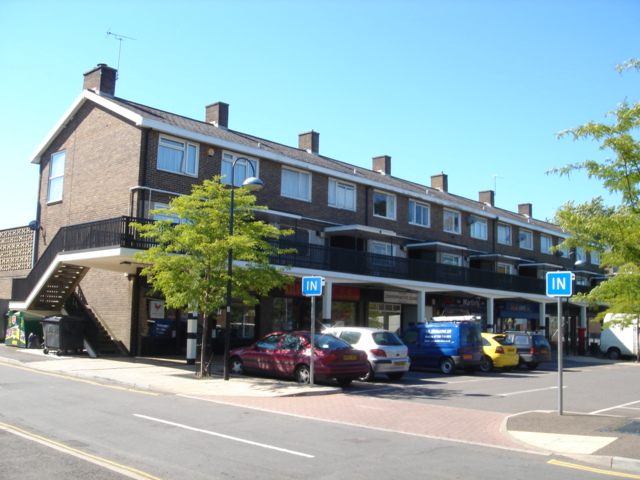
The Southgate neighbourhood's parade of shops

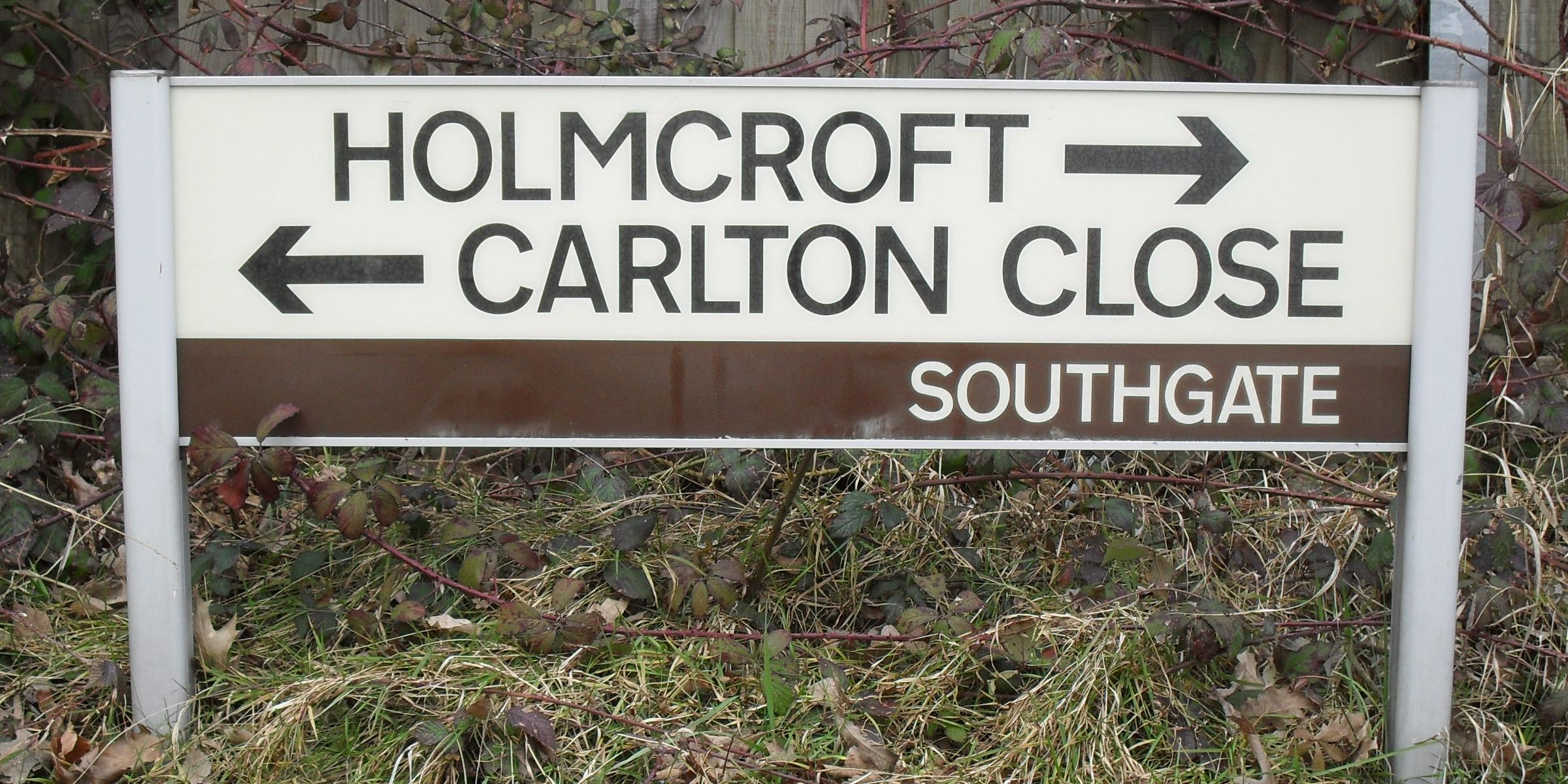
Each neighbourhood has colour-coded street name signs (Southgate example pictured).

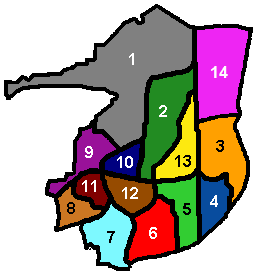
Neighbourhoods of Crawley, identified in the table

There are 14 residential neighbourhoods, each with a variety of housing types: terraced, semi-detached and detached houses, low-rise flats and bungalows. There are no residential tower blocks, apart from the eight-storey Milton Mount flats at the north end of Pound Hill. Many houses have their own gardens and are set back from roads. The hub of each neighbourhood is a shopping parade, community centre and church, and each has a school and recreational open spaces as well. Crawley Development Corporation's intention was for neighbourhood shops to cater only to basic needs, and for the town centre to be used for most shopping requirements. The number of shop units provided in the neighbourhood parades reflected this: despite the master plan making provision for at least 20 shops in each neighbourhood, the number actually built ranged from 19 in the outlying Langley Green neighbourhood to just seven in West Green, close to the town centre.

Population figures are now calculated by ward, and not all wards are coterminous with their neighbourhood. In 2007, the last year for which population figures by neighbourhood are available, the most populous neighbourhoods—and the only two with more than 10,000 residents—were Pound Hill (14,716) and Broadfield (12,666). Northgate and West Green had 4,407 and 4,404 residents respectively; the populations of the other neighbourhoods varied between approximately 5,000 and 9,000.

Each of the 14 residential neighbourhoods is identified by a colour, which is shown on street name signs in a standard format throughout the town: below the street name, the neighbourhood name is shown in white text on a coloured background.

Number on map	Name	Colour	Construction commenced
1	Langley Green	Grey	1952
2	Northgate	Dark green	1951
3	Pound Hill	Orange	1953
4	Maidenbower	Blue	1987
5	Furnace Green	Light green	1960
6	Tilgate	Red	1955
7	Broadfield	Sky blue	1969
8	Bewbush	Light brown	1975
9	Ifield	Purple	1953
10	West Green	Dark blue	1949
11	Gossops Green	Maroon	1956
12	Southgate	Brown	1955
13	Three Bridges	Yellow	1952
14	Forge Wood	Pink	2014

Manor Royal, the main industrial estate, is in the northeast of the town. Further north, Gatwick Airport was built on the site of a manor house, Gatwick Manor, close to the village of Lowfield Heath. Most of the village was demolished when the airport expanded, but the Grade II*-listed St Michael and All Angels Church, remains. The site of Lowfield Heath village, now occupied by warehouses and light industrial units, is on the airport's southern boundary, between the perimeter road and the A23 close to Manor Royal. Worth was originally a village with its own civil parish, which lay just beyond the eastern edge of the Crawley urban area and borough boundary; but the development of the Pound Hill and Maidenbower neighbourhoods has filled in the gaps, and the borough boundary has been extended to include the whole of the village. The civil parish of Worth remains, albeit reduced in size, as part of the Mid Sussex district.

- Tinsley Green, a hamlet in Worth parish, is now within the Forge Wood neighbourhood. Its houses, farms and public house, the Greyhound (at which the British and World Marbles Championship has been held annually since 1932), lie on or around an east–west minor road running from the main Balcombe–Horley road to the Manor Royal industrial estate.
- The hamlet of Fernhill is 1 1/2 miles (2.4 km) east of Gatwick Airport and the same distance south of Horley. It has been wholly within the borough since 1990, when the borough and county boundary was moved eastwards to align exactly with the M23 motorway. Until then, its houses and farms straddled the boundary. Fernhill was the site of a fatal aeroplane crash in 1969: 50 people (including two residents) died when Ariana Afghan Airlines Flight 701 crashed into a house on Fernhill Road.

== Demography ==
Year	Population
1901	4,433
1921	5,437
1941	7,090
1961	25,550
1981	87,865
2001	99,744
2011	106,597
2021	118,493

The growth in population of the new town (around 1,000% between 1951 and 2001) has outstripped that of most similar-sized settlements. For example, in the same period, the population of the neighbouring district of Horsham grew by just 99%. At that time the population was 99,744; this increased to 106,597 by the 2011 census. and to 118,493 in 2021 (out of a total population of 882,674 in West Sussex). White people made up 73.4% of the population in Crawley in 2021, of those 61.8% identified as White British, a decrease from 84.5% in 2001, while those who identified as "Other White" were 11.6%. Asians made up 15.4% of the population, with Indians and Pakistanis making up 6.2% and 5.2% of the population respectively, while Sri Lankans (mostly of Tamil descent/background) make up the majority of "Other Asian" write-ins.

Those who recorded their main language as English made up 84.3% of the population. Other languages were Romanian (2.1%), Polish (1.7%), Portuguese (1.4%), Tamil (1.3), Gujarati (1.1%) and Hindustani (Hindi/Urdu) (1.1%). The town has a Tamil learning centre which was established in 2006. Many Chagossians expelled from the Chagos Archipelago in the Indian Ocean settled in Crawley in the 1960s and 1970s, and it was reported in 2016 that the town's Chagossian community numbered approximately 3,000 people. Former Crawley MP Henry Smith stated that Crawley "is home to perhaps the largest Chagossian population in the world".

The town has a population density of around 2,635 persons per square kilometre, making it the second most densely populated district in West Sussex, after Worthing. In 2021, around 28.6% were in managerial, administrative or professional occupations, although this varied by ward, with just 19.5% in Broadfield West, compared to 45.7% in Maidenbower. The proportion of people in the town with higher education qualifications is lower than the national average. Around 27.5% have a qualification at level 4 or above, compared to 33.9% nationally.

=== Religion ===
At the 2021 census the largest religious affiliation was Christianity at 42.6%, followed by those with no religion at 35.1%, Islam at 9.7%, Hinduism at 5.1%, Sikhism at 0.7%, Buddhism at 0.4%, Judaism at 0.1% and any other religion at 0.5%.

Like the rest of Sussex, Crawley's Church of England churches fall within the Diocese of Chichester. These churches include St John the Baptist's Church's in Crawley town centre and St Margaret's Church, both of which date from the 13th century. Parts of St Nicholas Church in Worth date to the 10th century. Ifield Friends Meeting House dates from 1676 and is one of the oldest purpose-built Quaker meeting houses in the world.

Crawley is home to three mosques. A Gurjar Hindu community became established in Crawley in 1968 and opened a mandir (temple) and community centre in a building in West Green in 1998. A Hindu temple in Ifield opened in 2010, the largest such temple in South East England, at 230 m^{2} (2,500 sq ft), with a 1,216 m^{2} (13,090 sq ft) community centre, offices, gardens and sports facilities.

== Economy ==
Labour profile
Job	Number	%
Total employee jobs	79,700	—N/a
Full-time	58,100	72.9%
Part-time	21,600	27.1%
Manufacturing	7,500	9.4%
Construction	1,800	2.2%
Services	70,100	87.9%
Distribution, hotels & restaurants	19,600	24.6%
Transport & communications	23,900	30.0%
Finance, IT, other business activities	15,400	19.3%
Public admin, education & health	9,600	12.1%
Other services	1,600	2.0%
Tourism-related	6,600	8.3%

Crawley traded as a market town. The Development Corporation intended to develop it as a centre for manufacturing and light engineering, with an industrial zone. The rapid growth of Gatwick Airport provided opportunities for businesses in the aviation, transport, warehousing and distribution industries. The significance of the airport to local employment and enterprise was reflected by the formation of the Gatwick Diamond partnership. This venture, supported by local businesses, local government and SEEDA, South East England's Regional Development Agency, aims to maintain and improve the Crawley and Gatwick area's status as a region of national and international economic importance.

Since the Second World War, unemployment in Crawley has been low: the rate was 1.47% of the working-age population in 2003. During the boom of the 1980s the town boasted the lowest level of unemployment in the UK. Continuous growth and investment have made Crawley one of the most important business and employment centres in the South East England region.

In April 2020, the Centre for Cities thinktank identified Crawley as the place in Britain at the highest risk of widespread job losses due to the COVID-19 recession; classing 56% of jobs in the town as either vulnerable or very vulnerable of being furloughed or lost.

=== Manufacturing industry ===
Crawley was already a modest industrial centre by the end of the Second World War. Building was an important trade: 800 people were employed by building and joinery firms, and two—Longley's and Cook's—were large enough to have their own factories. In 1949, 1,529 people worked in manufacturing: the main industries were light and precision engineering and aircraft repair. Many of the jobs in these industries were highly skilled.

Industrial development had to take place relatively soon after the new town was established because part of the corporation's remit was to move people and jobs out of an overcrowded and war-damaged London. Industrial jobs were needed as well as houses and shops to create a balanced community where people could settle. The Development Corporation wanted the new town to support a large and mixed industrial base, with factories and other buildings based in a single zone rather than spread throughout the town. A 267-acre (108 ha) site in the northeastern part of the development area was chosen. Its advantages included flat land with no existing development; proximity to the London–Brighton railway line, the A23 and the planned M23; space for railway sidings (which were eventually built on a much smaller scale than envisaged); and an adjacent 44-acre (18 ha) site reserved for future expansion, on the other side of the railway line (again, not used for this purpose in the end). Princess Elizabeth (later Queen Elizabeth II) opened the first part of the industrial area on 25 January 1950; its main road was named Manor Royal, and this name eventually came to refer to the whole estate.

The Corporation stipulated that several manufacturing industries should be developed, rather than allowing one sector or firm to dominate. It did not seek to attract companies by offering financial or other incentives; instead, it set out to create the ideal conditions for industrial development to arise naturally, by providing large plots of land with room for expansion, allowing firms to build their own premises or rent ready-made buildings, and constructing a wide range of building types and sizes.

Despite the lack of direct incentives, many firms applied to move to the Manor Royal estate: it was considered such an attractive place to relocate to that the Development Corporation was able to choose between applicants to achieve the ideal mix of firms, and little advertising or promotion had to be undertaken. One year after Manor Royal was opened, eighteen firms were trading there, including four with more than 100 employees and one with more than 1,000. By 1964, businesses which had moved to the town since 1950 employed 16,000 people; the master plan had anticipated between 8,000 and 8,500. In 1978 there were 105 such firms, employing nearly 20,000 people.

Thales Group opened a new manufacturing and office complex in Crawley in 2009. The site consolidated manufacturing and offices in the Crawley area and the south-east of England.

=== Service industry and commerce ===
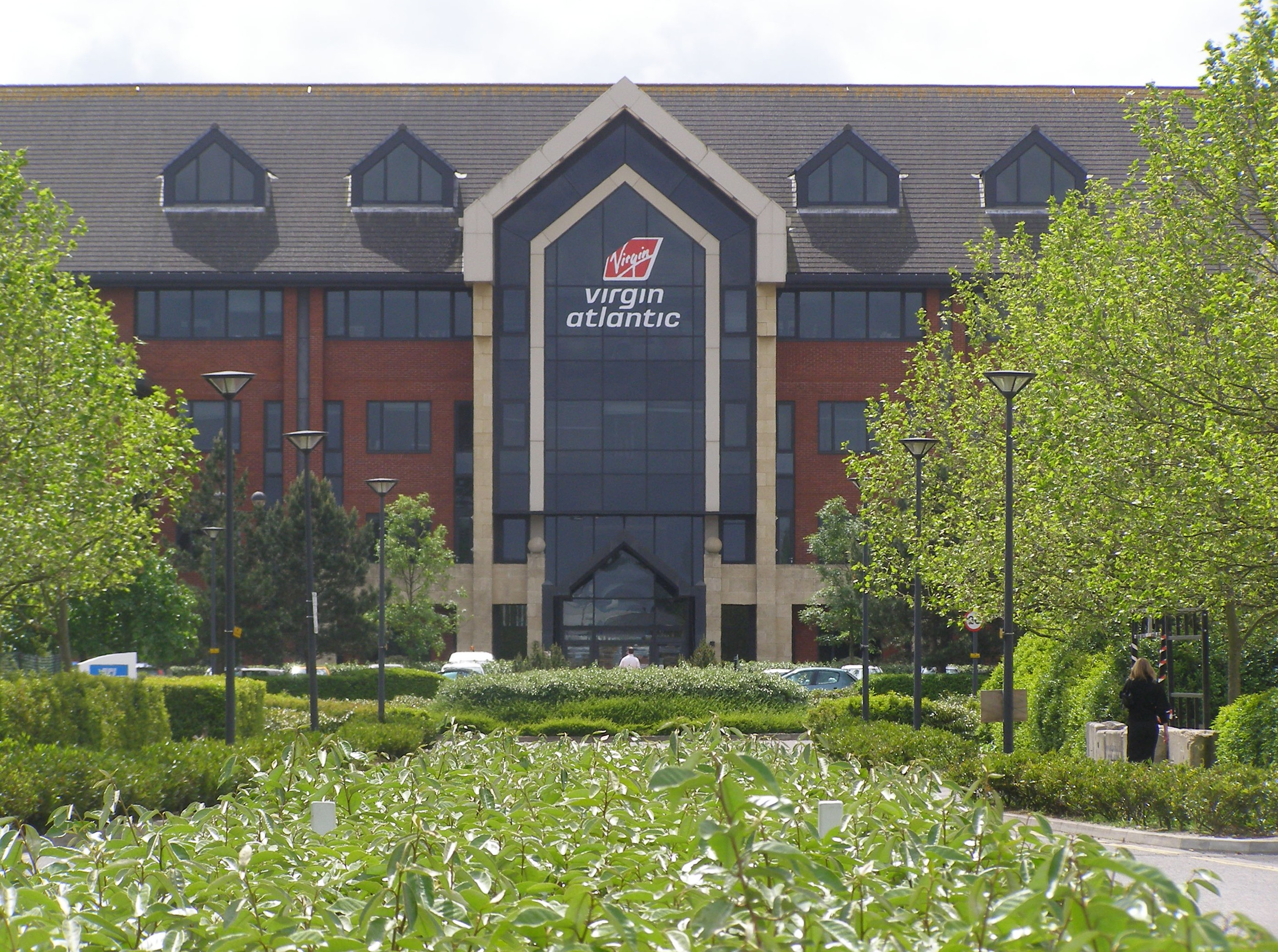
Former Virgin Atlantic head office.

While most of the jobs created in the new town's early years were in manufacturing, the tertiary sector developed strongly from the 1960s. The Manor Royal estate, with its space, proximity to Gatwick Airport and good transport links, attracted airport-related services such as logistics, catering, distribution and warehousing; and the corporation and private companies built offices throughout the town. Office floorspace in the town increased from 55,000 square feet (5,100 m^{2}) in 1965 to a conservative estimate of 453,000 square feet (42,100 m^{2}) in 1984. Major schemes during that period included premises for the Westminster Bank, British Caledonian and The Office of the Paymaster-General. The five-storey Overline House above the railway station, completed in 1968, is used by Crawley's NHS primary care trust and various other companies.

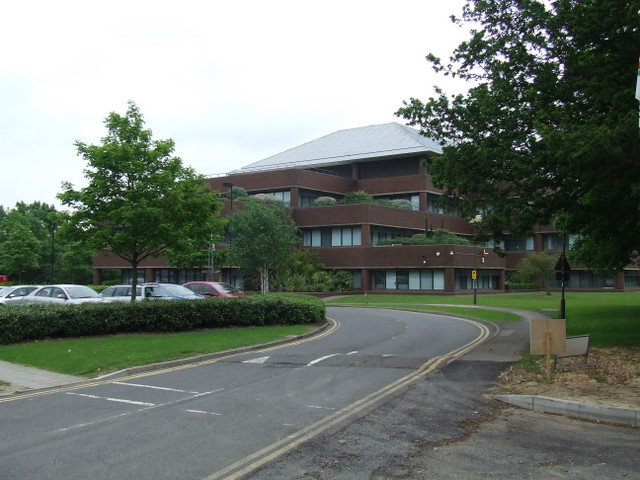
Schlumberger House, the head office of WesternGeco at Gatwick Airport

Companies headquartered in Crawley include Doosan Babcock Energy, WesternGeco, Virgin Atlantic, Virgin Atlantic's associated travel agency Virgin Holidays, William Reed Business Media, Dualit and the Office of the Paymaster-General. Danish company Novo, which manufactures much of the world's insulin supply, has its UK headquarters at the Broadfield Business Park, and BDO Global has an office in Crawley. The UK headquarters of Nestlé is in the Manor Royal area of Crawley. In addition the registered offices of TUI UK and Thomson Airways are located in Crawley.

British Airways took over British Caledonian's former headquarters near the Manor Royal estate, renamed it "Astral Towers" and based its British Airways Holidays and Air Miles divisions there. Other companies formerly headquartered in Crawley include Astraeus Airlines, British United Airways, CityFlyer Express, CP Ships, First Choice Airways, GB Airways, Laker Airways, Tradewinds Airways, and Air Europe.

Crawley has numerous hotels, including The George Hotel, dated to 1615. It is reputedly haunted.

=== Shopping and retail ===
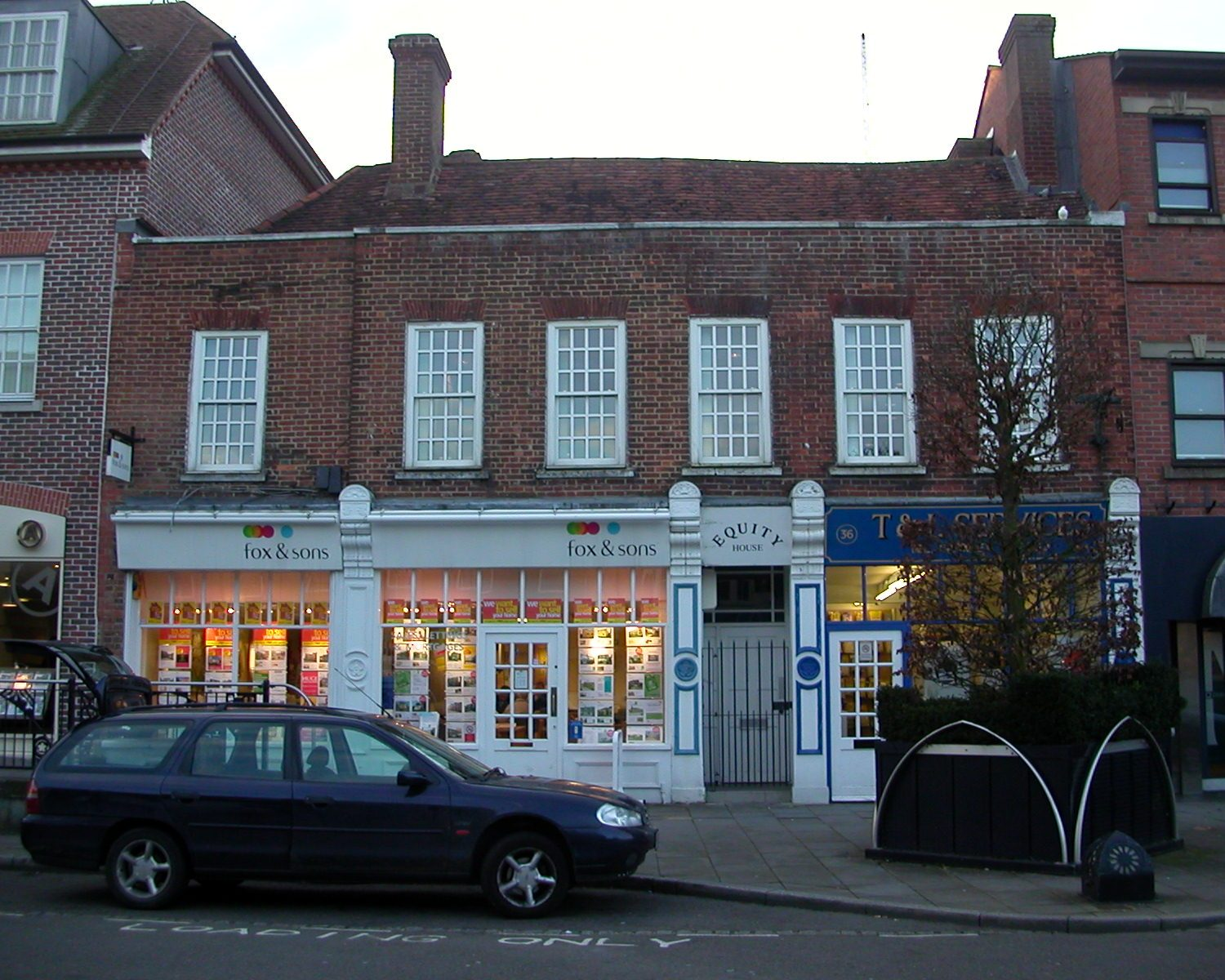
34 and 36 High Street - Grade II late 18th-century brick building with sash windows, two chimneys and a tiled roof.

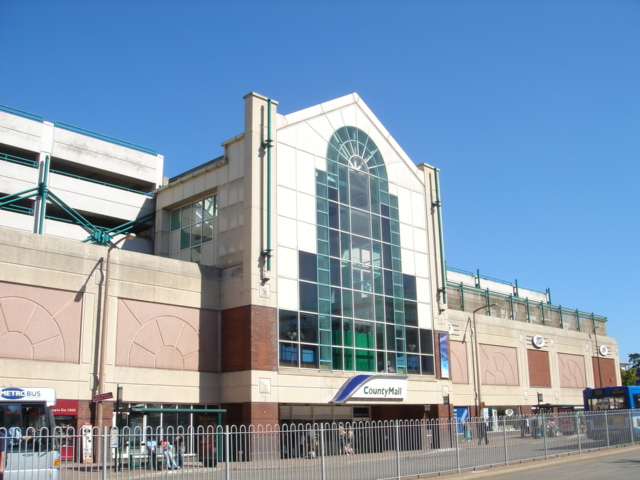
The Friary Way entrance to County Mall

Even before the new town was planned, Crawley was a retail centre for the surrounding area: there were 177 shops in the town in 1948, 99 of which were on the High Street. Early new town residents relied on these shopping facilities until the Corporation implemented the master plan's designs for a new shopping area on the mostly undeveloped land east of the High Street and north of the railway line. The Broadwalk and its 23 shops were built in 1954, followed by the Queen's Square complex and surrounding streets in the mid-1950s. Queen's Square, a pedestrianised plaza surrounded by large shops and linked to the High Street by The Broadwalk, was officially opened in 1958 by Queen Elizabeth II. The town centre was completed by 1960, by which time Crawley was already recognised as an important regional, rather than merely local, shopping centre.

In the 1960s and 1970s, large branches of Tesco, Sainsbury's and Marks & Spencer were opened (the Tesco superstore was the largest in Britain at the time). The shopping area was also expanded southeastwards from Queen's Square: although the original plans of 1975 were not implemented fully, several large shop units were built and a new pedestrianised link—The Martlets—was provided between Queen's Square and Haslett Avenue, the main road to Three Bridges. The remaining land between this area and the railway line was sold for private development by 1982; in 1992 a 450,000 square feet (41,800 m^{2}) shopping centre named County Mall (Note: Before County Mall opened it was known as "TC6 Crawley".) was opened there. As originally designed, the mall had 91 shops and 1,800 parking spaces, and was anchored by a 1,250,000-square-foot (116,100 m^{2}) Owen Owen department store and a 1,250,000-square-foot (116,100 m^{2}) British Home Stores outlet. Other major retailers included The Entertainer, Boots, WHSmith and Superdry as well as over 80 smaller outlets. The town's main bus station was redesigned and roads including the main A2220 Haslett Avenue were rerouted.

A regeneration strategy for the town centre, "Centre Vision 2000", was produced in 1993. Changes brought about by the scheme included 50,000 square feet (4,600 m^{2}) of additional retail space in Queen's Square and The Martlets, and a mixed-use development at the southern end of the High Street on land formerly occupied by Robinson Road (which was demolished) and Spencers Road (shortened and severed at one end). An ASDA superstore, opened in September 2003, forms the centrepiece. Robinson Road, previously named Church Road, had been at the heart of the old Crawley: a century before its demolition, its buildings included two chapels, a school, a hospital and a post office.

== Public services ==
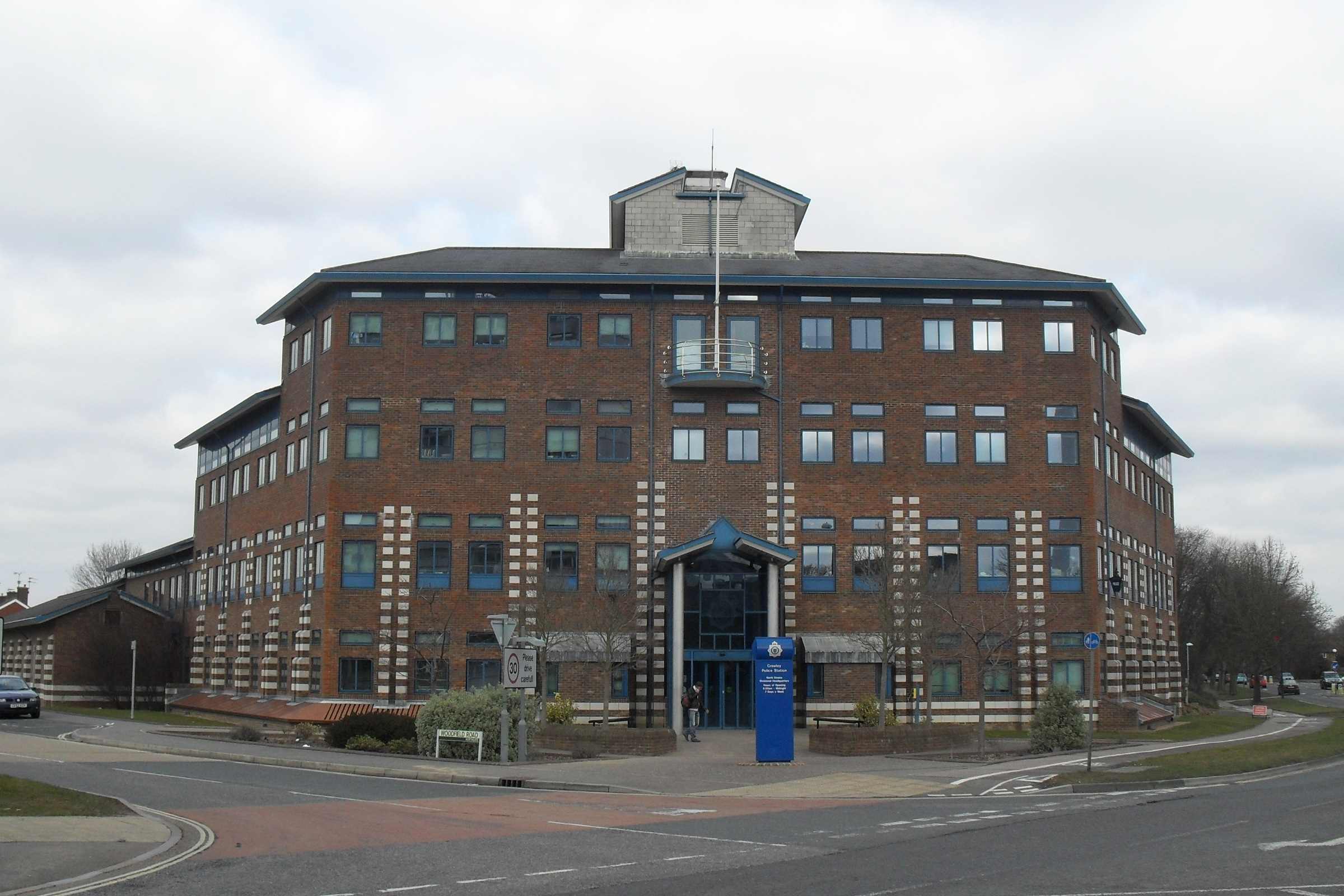
Crawley police station

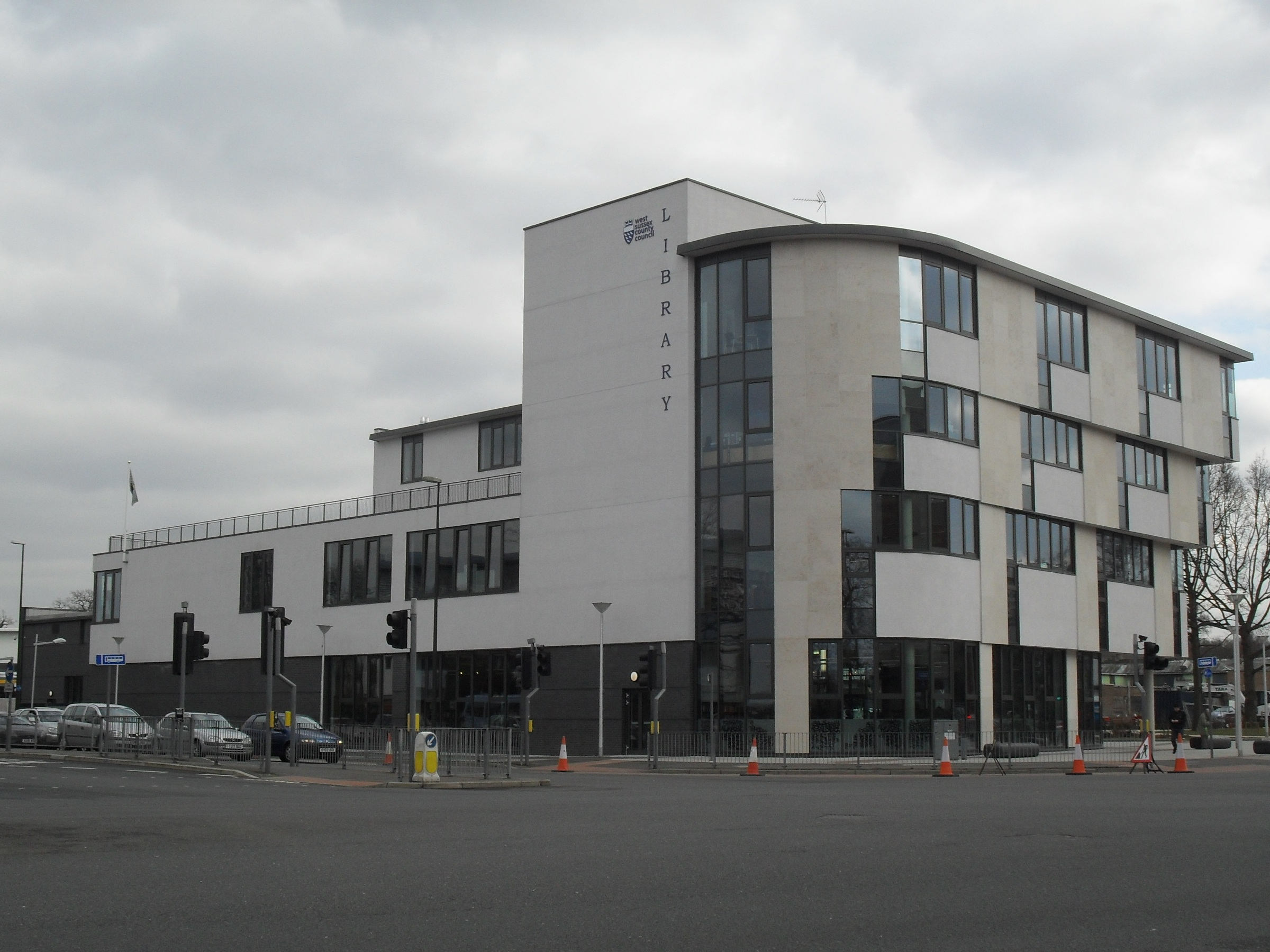
Crawley library, opened in December 2008

Policing in Crawley is provided by Sussex Police; the British Transport Police are responsible for the rail network. The borough is the police headquarters for the West Sussex division, and is itself divided into three areas for the purposes of neighbourhood policing: Crawley East, Crawley West, and Crawley Town Centre. A separate division covers Gatwick Airport. There is a police station in the town centre; it is open 24 hours a day, and the front desk is staffed for 16 hours each day except Christmas Day. Statutory emergency fire and rescue services are provided by the West Sussex Fire and Rescue Service which operates a fire station in the town centre. The South East Coast Ambulance Service is responsible for ambulance and paramedic services.

Crawley Hospital in West Green is operated by West Sussex Primary Care Trust. Some services are provided by the Surrey and Sussex Healthcare NHS Trust, including a 24-hour Urgent Treatment Centre for semi-life-threatening injuries. The Surrey and Sussex was judged as "weak" by the Healthcare Commission in 2008, however in 2015 both the hospital and the Surrey and Sussex Trust were rated good by the Care Quality Commission.

Thames Water is responsible for all waste water and sewerage provision. Residents in most parts of Crawley receive their drinking water from Southern Water; areas in the north of the town around Gatwick Airport are provided by Sutton & East Surrey Water; and South East Water supplies Maidenbower.

UK Power Networks is the distribution network operator responsible for electricity. Gas is supplied by Southern Gas Networks who own and manage the South East Local Distribution Zone.

The provision of public services was made in co-operation with the local authorities as the town grew in the 1950s and 1960s. They oversaw the opening of a fire station in 1958, the telephone exchange, police station and town centre health clinic in 1961 and an ambulance station in 1963. Plans for a new hospital on land at The Hawth were abandoned, however, and the existing hospital in West Green was redeveloped instead. Gas was piped from Croydon, 20 miles (32 km) away, and a gasworks at Redhill, while the town's water supply came from the Weir Wood reservoir south of East Grinstead and another at Pease Pottage.

In December 2008, a new three-storey library was opened in new buildings at Southgate Avenue, replacing the considerably undersized establishment formerly at County Buildings.

The Civil Aviation Authority Regulation Safety Group is in the Aviation House in Gatwick Airport in Crawley.

== Transport ==
Crawley's development as a market town was helped by its location on the London–Brighton turnpike. The area was joined to the railway network in the mid-19th century; and since the creation of the new town, there have been major road upgrades (including a motorway link), a guided bus transit system and the establishment of an airport which by 2024 had become the second busiest in Britain and the tenth busiest in Europe.

=== Road ===
The London–Brighton turnpike ran through the centre of Crawley, forming the High Street and Station Road. When Britain's major roads were classified by the British government's Ministry of Transport between 1919 and 1923, it was given the number A23. It was bypassed by a new dual carriageway in 1938 (which forms the A23's current route through the town), and then later to the east side of the town by the M23 motorway, which was opened in 1975. This connects London's orbital motorway, the M25, to the A23 at Pease Pottage, at the southern edge of Crawley's built-up area. The original single-carriageway A23 became the A2219. The M23 has junctions in the Crawley area at the A2011/A264 (Junction 10) and Maidenbower (area of Crawley) (Junction 10A). The end of the motorway at Pease Pottage is Junction 11. The A2011, another dual-carriageway, joins the A23 in West Green and provides a link, via the A2004, to the town centre.

The main east–west links are provided by the A2220, which follows the former route of the A264 through the town, linking the A23 directly to the A264 at Copthorne, from where it then runs to East Grinstead. The A264 also connects Crawley to Horsham to the south-west.

=== Rail ===
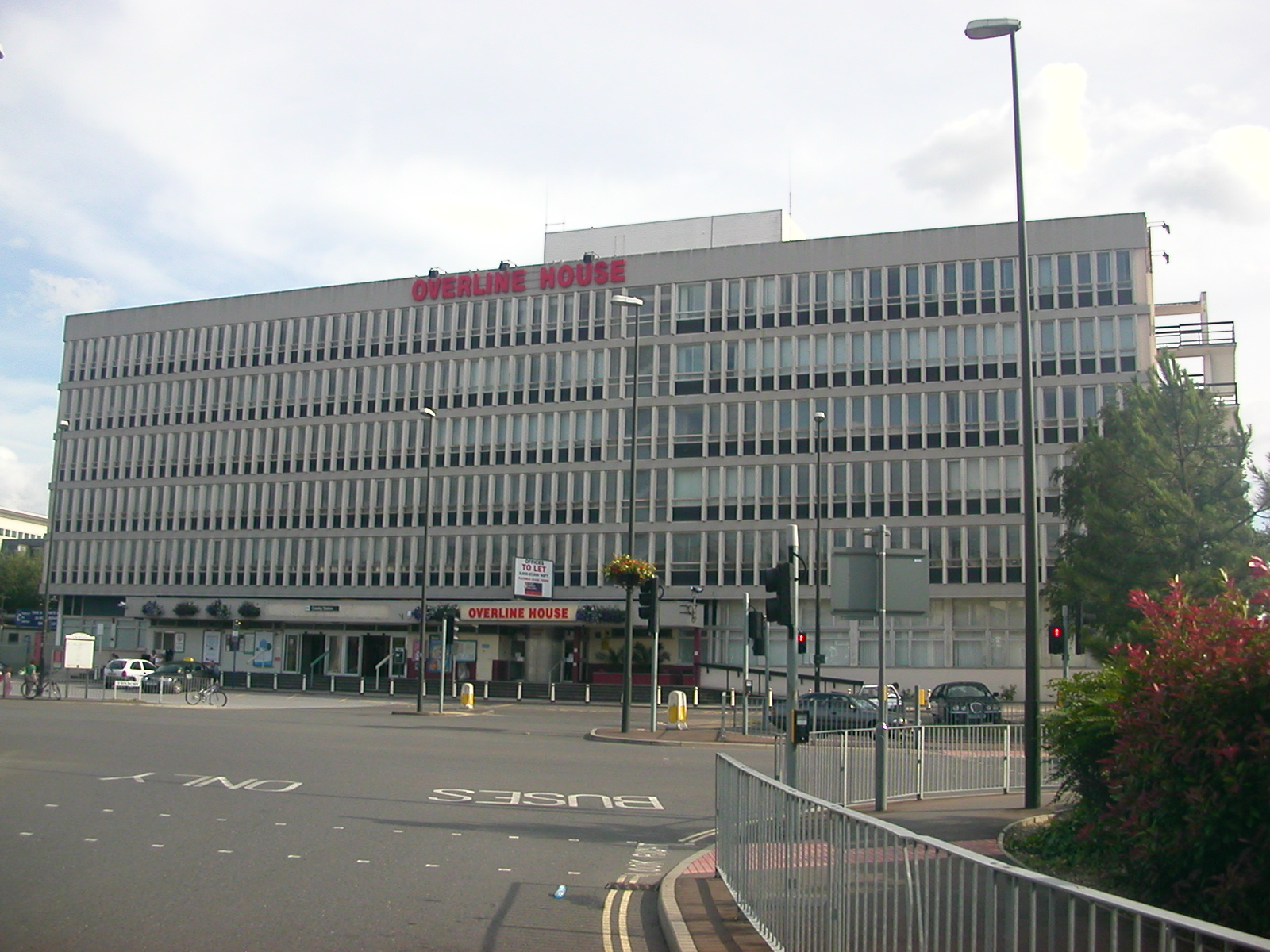
Crawley station, with five storeys of offices above the ticket office and concourse area

The first railway line in the area was the Brighton Main Line, which opened as far as Haywards Heath on 12 July 1841 and reached Brighton on 21 September 1841. It ran through Three Bridges, which was then a small village east of Crawley, and a station was built to serve it.

A line to Horsham, now part of the Arun Valley Line, was opened on 14 February 1848. A station was provided next to Crawley High Street from that date. A new station was constructed slightly to the east, in conjunction with the Overline House commercial development, and replaced the original station which closed on 28 July 1968. The ticket office and Up (London-bound) platform waiting areas form the ground floor of the office building.

The urban area of Crawley is served by a total of three rail stations including Ifield railway station. Due to Crawley's expansion this station is now surrounded by the town's western areas. Opened as Lyons Crossing Halt on 1 June 1907 to serve the village of Ifield, it was soon renamed Ifield Halt, dropping the "Halt" suffix in 1930.

Regular train services run from Crawley, and also Ifield, to London Victoria and London Bridge stations, Gatwick Airport, East Croydon, Horsham, Bognor Regis, Chichester, Portsmouth and Southampton. Three Bridges has direct Thameslink trains to Bedford and Brighton.

=== Bus and Fastway ===
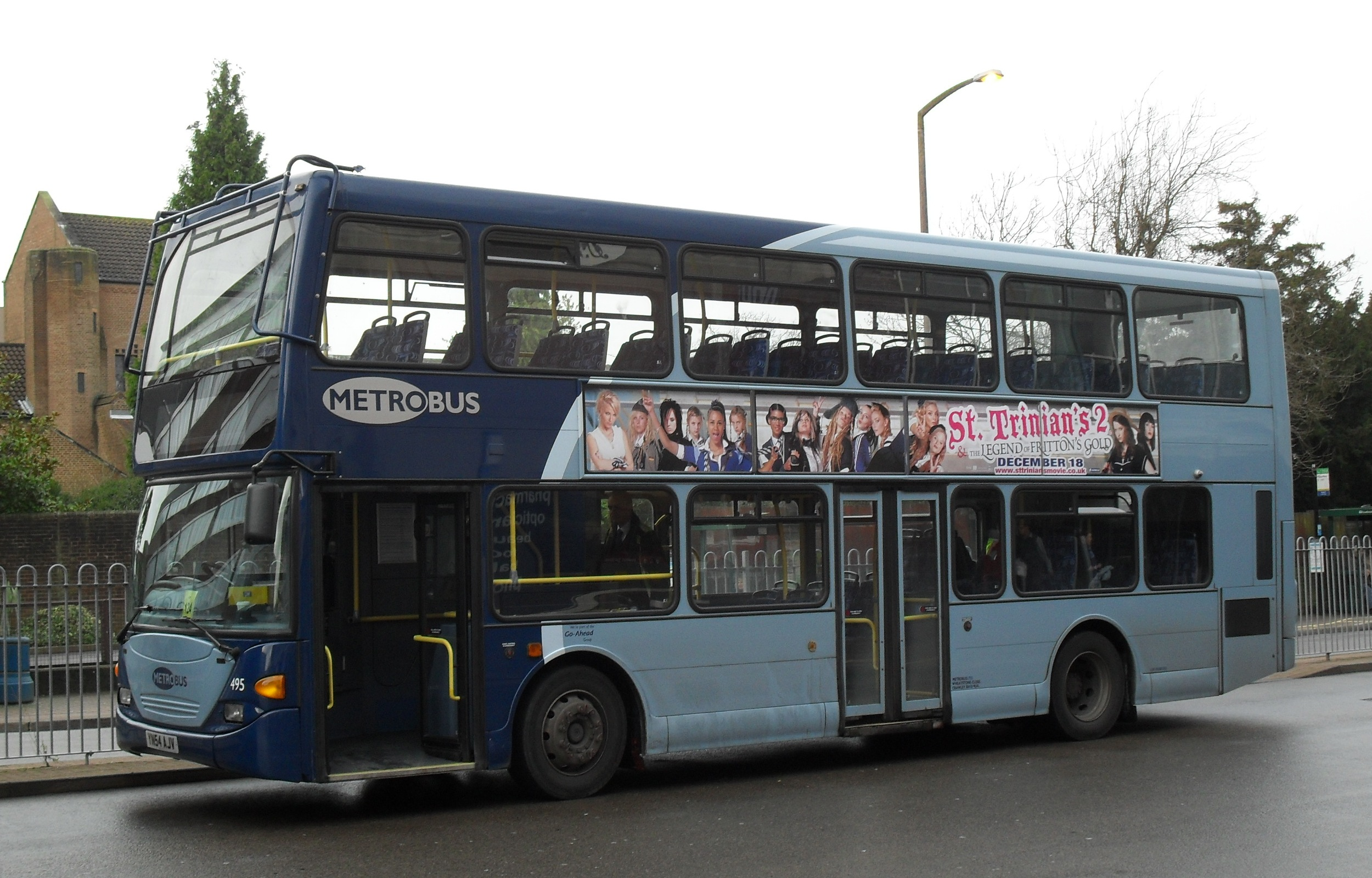
A Metrobus double-decker bus at Crawley bus station

Crawley was one of several towns where the boundaries of Southdown Motor Services and London Transport bus services met. In 1958 the companies reached an agreement which allowed them both to provide services in all parts of the town. When the National Bus Company was formed in 1969, its London Country Bus Services subsidiary took responsibility for many routes, including Green Line Coaches cross-London services which operated to distant destinations such as Watford, Luton and Amersham. A coach station was opened by Southdown in 1931 on the A23 at County Oak, near Lowfield Heath: it was a regular stopping point for express coaches between London and towns on the Sussex coast. This traffic started to serve Gatwick when the airport began to grow, however. When the National Bus Company was broken up, local services were provided by the new South West division of London Country Bus Services, which later became part of the Arriva group. Metrobus acquired these routes from Arriva in March 2001, and is now Crawley's main operator. It provides local services between the neighbourhoods and town centre, and longer-distance routes to Horsham, Redhill, Tunbridge Wells, Worthing and Brighton.

In September 2003 a guided bus service, Fastway, began operating between Bewbush and Gatwick Airport. A second route, from Broadfield to the Langshott area of Horley, north of Gatwick Airport, was added on 27 August 2005.

=== Gatwick Airport ===
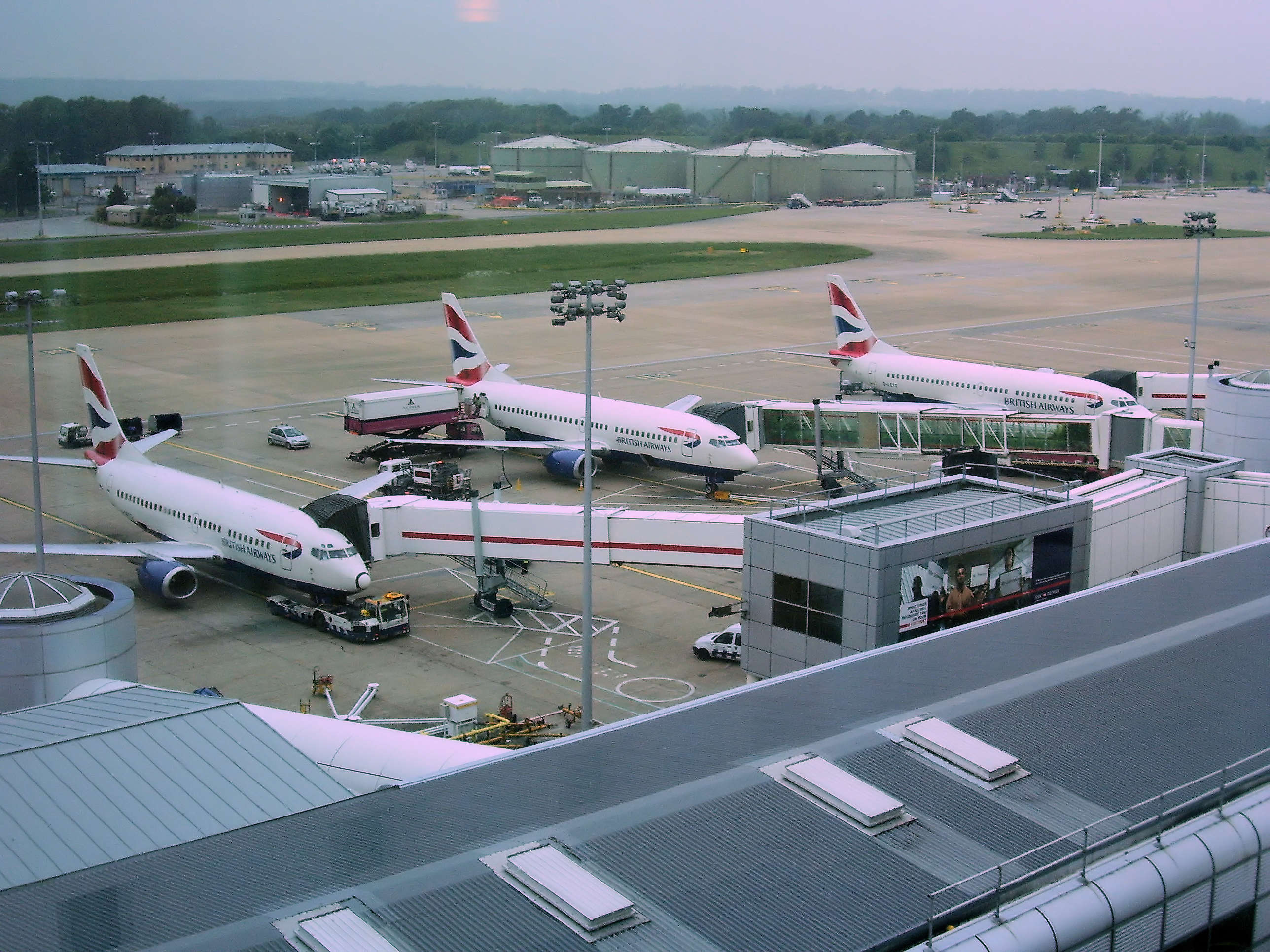
Gatwick is the world's second busiest single-runway international airport.

Gatwick Airport was licensed as a private airfield in August 1930. It was used during the Second World War as an RAF base, and returned to civil use in 1946. There were proposals to close the airport in the late 1940s, but in 1950 the government announced that it was to be developed as London's second airport. It was closed between 1956 and 1958 for rebuilding. Her Majesty The Queen reopened it on 9 June 1958. A second terminal, the North Terminal, was built in 1988. An agreement existed between BAA and West Sussex County Council preventing the building of a second runway before 2019. Nevertheless, consultations were launched in 2002 by the Department for Transport, at which proposals for additional facilities and runways were considered. It was agreed that there would be no further expansion at Gatwick unless it became impossible to meet growth targets at London Heathrow Airport within existing pollution limits.

=== Walking ===
The Worth Way is a 7-mile (11 km) long bridleway that connects Three Bridges with the town of East Grinstead to the east. It opened in July 1979 and follows the trackbed of the former Three Bridges to Tunbridge Wells Central railway line. The section between Three Bridges and the M23 motorway is within the borough. In the north of the borough the 150-mile (240 km) Sussex Border Path runs east–west on a route approximately following Sussex's borders from Thorney Island to Rye.

== Sport and leisure ==
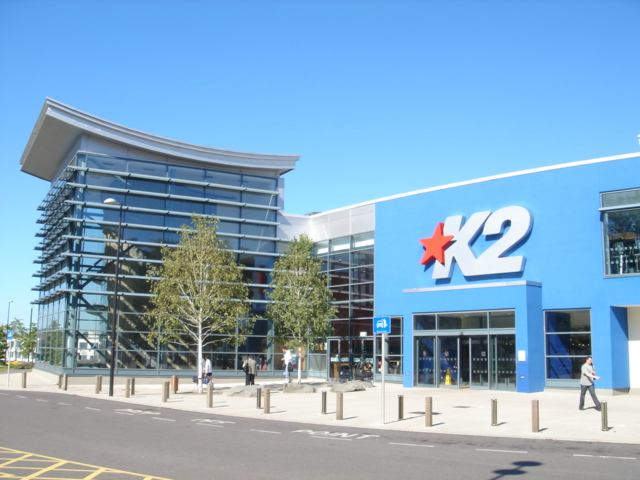
Entrance to the K2 Leisure Centre

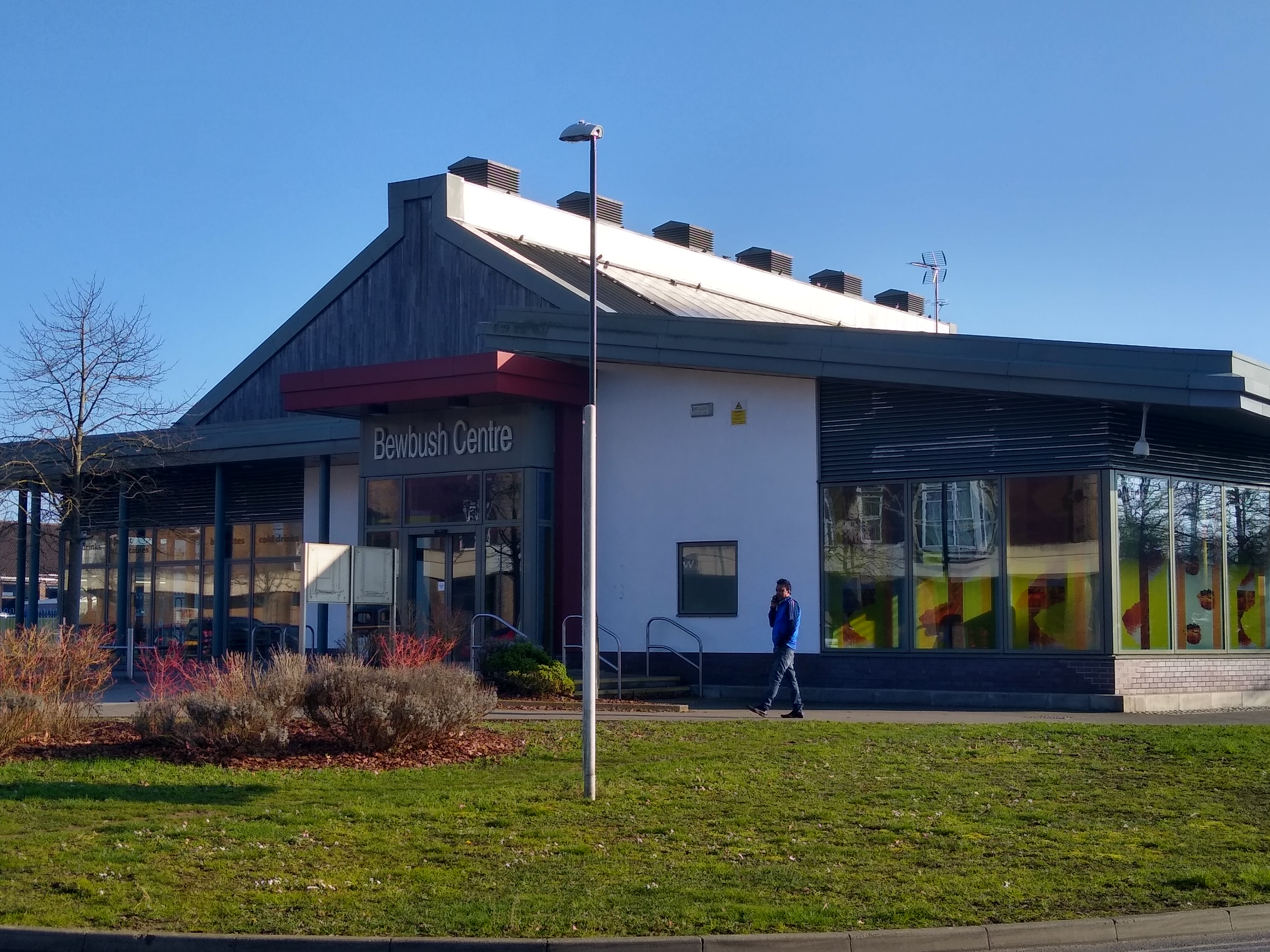
Bewbush Leisure Centre

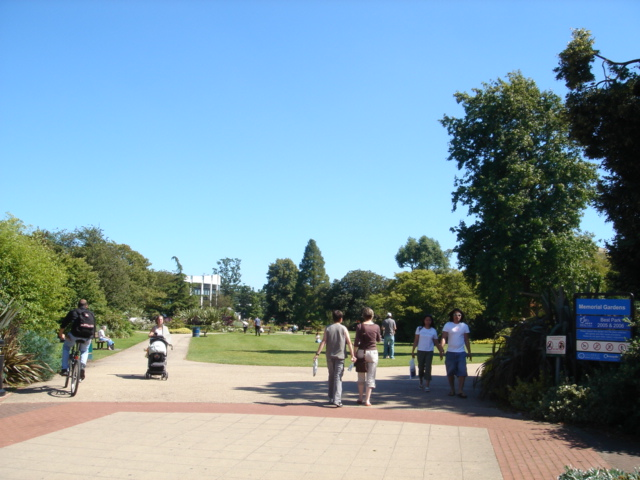
The Memorial Gardens

Crawley Town F.C. is Crawley's main football team. Formed in 1896, it moved in 1949 to a ground at Town Mead adjacent to the West Green playing fields. Demand for land near the town centre led to the club moving in 1997 to the new Broadfield Stadium, now owned by the borough council. As of the 2025–26 season, Crawley Town F.C. are playing in League Two, the fourth tier of English football. Since 2018, Broadfield Stadium has also been home to Women's Super League team Brighton & Hove Albion.

Three Bridges F.C. play in the Isthmian League South East Division, the eighth tier of English football, while other lower-league clubs include Oakwood F.C. and Ifield Galaxy F.C. Crawley Rugby Club is based in Ifield, and a golf course was constructed in 1982 at Tilgate Park. Crawley Hockey Club plays their home matches at Hazelwick School, Three Bridges. Cricket has been played in Ifield since 1721, and Ifield Cricket Club was formed in 1804. Three Bridges Cricket Club is a founding member of the Sussex Cricket League and in 2018 were promoted back to the Premier Division.

The new town's original leisure centre was in Haslett Avenue in the Three Bridges neighbourhood. Building work started in the early 1960s, and a large swimming pool opened in 1964. The site was extended to include an athletics arena by 1967, and an additional large sports hall was opened by the town mayor, Councillor Ben Clay and Prime Minister Harold Wilson in 1974. However, the facilities became insufficient for the growing town, even though an annexe was opened in Bewbush in 1984. Athlete Zola Budd had been asked to take part in a 1,500-metre race as part of the opening celebrations, but her invitation was withdrawn at short notice because of concerns raised by council members about possible "political connotations and anti-apartheid demonstrators".

In 2005, Crawley Leisure Centre was closed and replaced by a new facility, the K2 Leisure Centre, on the campus of Thomas Bennett Community College near the Broadfield Stadium. Opened to the public on 14 November 2005, and officially by Lord Coe on 24 January 2006, the centre includes the only Olympic-sized swimming pool in South East England. In March 2008 the centre was named as a training site for the 2012 Olympics in London.

Crawley Development Corporation made little provision for the arts in the plans for the new town, and a proposed arts venue in the town centre was never built. Neighbourhood community centres and the Tilgate Forest Recreational Centre were used for some cultural activities, but it was not until 1988 that the town had a dedicated theatre and arts venue, at the Hawth Theatre. Crawley's earliest cinema, the Imperial Picture House on Brighton Road, lasted from 1909 until the 1940s; the Embassy Cinema on the High Street (opened in 1938) replaced it. A large Cineworld cinema has since opened in the Crawley Leisure Park, which itself also includes ten-pin bowling, various restaurants and bars and a fitness centre. The Moka nightclub on Station Way opened in October 2012 and closed in 2019.

Crawley is home to No6 detachment of the Sussex Army Cadet Force, a volunteer youth organisation, sponsored by the Ministry of Defence, which accepts cadets aged between 12 and 18 years of age.

Each neighbourhood has self-contained recreational areas, and there are other larger parks throughout the town. The Memorial Gardens, on the eastern side of Queen's Square, feature art displays, children's play areas and lawns, and a plaque commemorating those who died in two Second World War bombing incidents in 1943 and 1944. Goffs Park in Southgate covers 50 acres (20 ha), and has lakes, boating ponds, a model railway and many other features. Tilgate Park and Nature Centre has walled gardens, lakes, large areas of woodland with footpaths and bridleways, a golfing area and a collection of animals and birds.

== Heritage ==
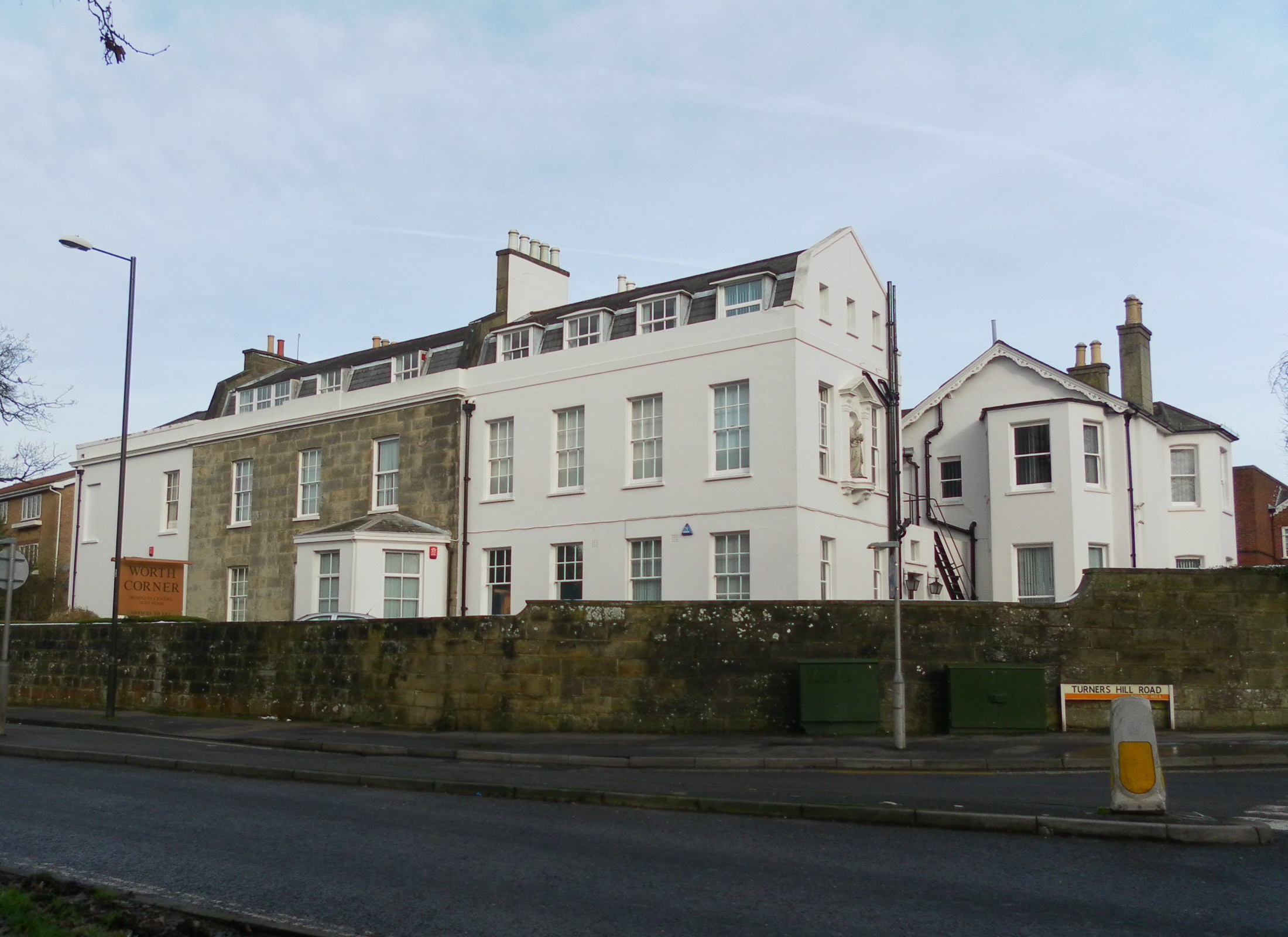
The Grade II listed Worth Training Centre, Turners Hill Road, Pound Hill, Crawley

Crawley Museum is based in the town centre. Stone Age and Bronze Age remains discovered in the area are on display, as well as more recent artefacts including parts of Vine Cottage, an old timber-framed building on the High Street which was once home to former Punch editor Mark Lemon and which was demolished when the ASDA development was built.

Crawley has three Grade I listed buildings (the parish church of St Margaret in Ifield, the parish church of St Nicholas, Worth, and the Friends Meeting House in Langley Lane, Ifield), 12 Grade II* listed buildings and 85 Grade II listed buildings. The borough council has also awarded locally listed building status to 58 buildings.

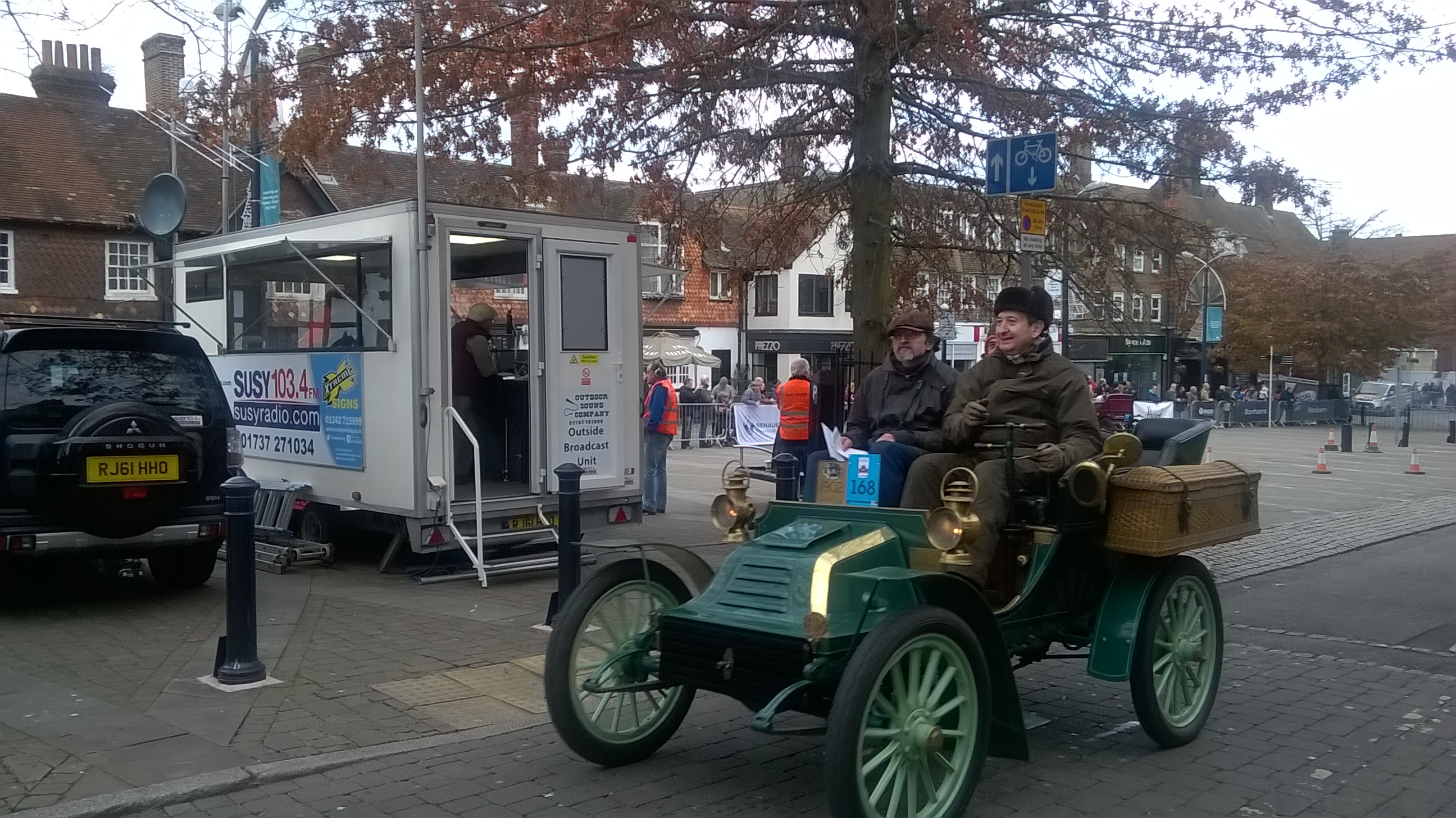
1902 Autocar in the 2018 London to Brighton Veteran Car Run, High Street, Crawley.

The high street becomes an annual focus of motoring heritage in November as one of the official stops on the London to Brighton Veteran Car Run.

== Education ==
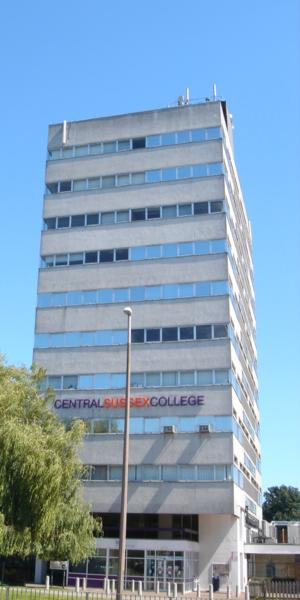
The main building of Central Sussex College

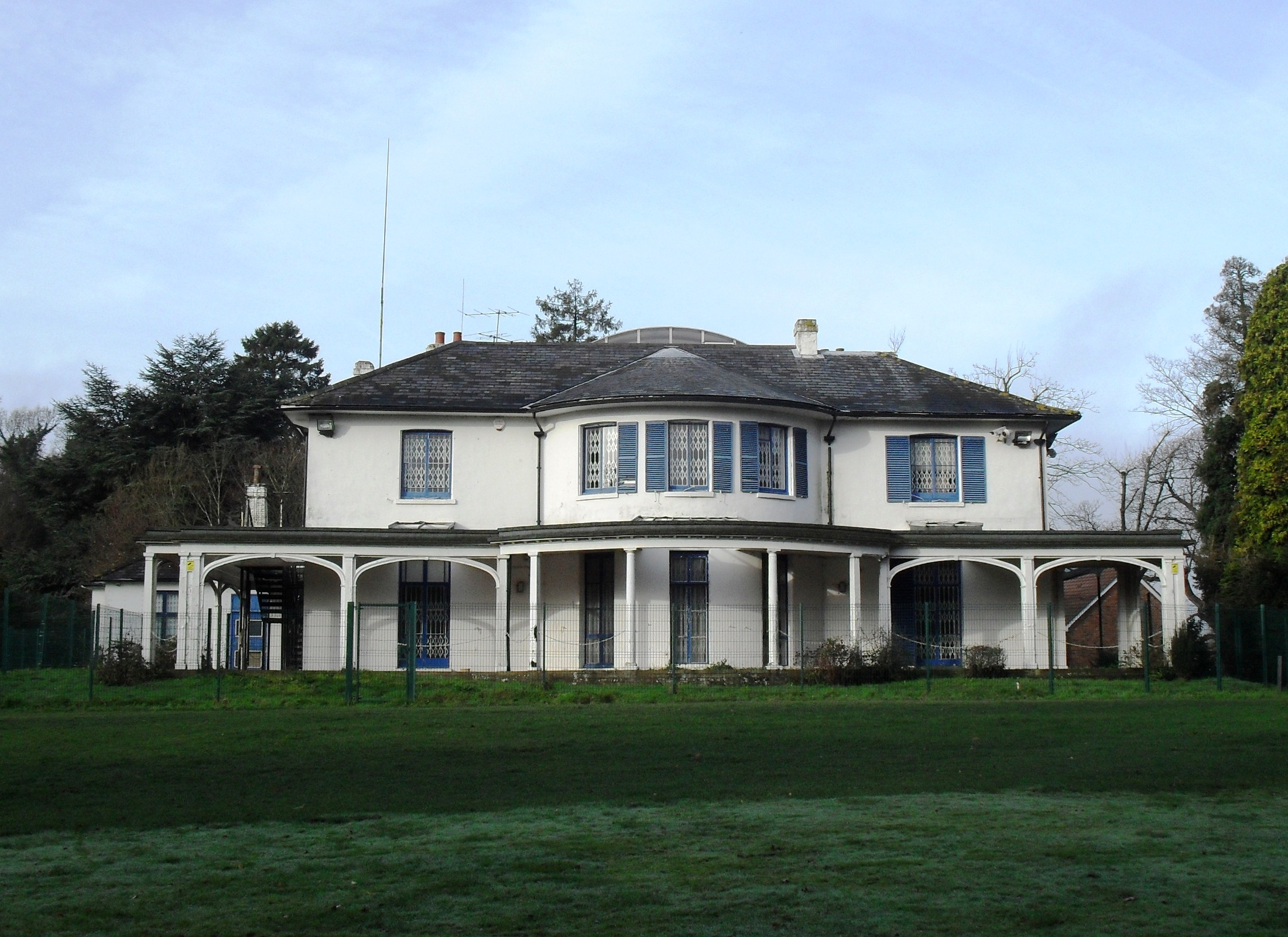
Broadfield House, which now houses the Atelier 21 Future School

Crawley has 17 primary schools (including two Church of England and two Roman Catholic) and four pairs of infant and junior Schools. Maintained primary and secondary schools were reorganised in 2004 following the Local Education Authority's decision to change the town's three-tier system of first, middle and secondary schools to a more standard primary/secondary divide. Most of the schools opened in that year; others changed their status at this date (for example, from a middle to a junior school).

Secondary education is provided at one of six secondary schools, all of which have a sixth form: Hazelwick School, Holy Trinity Church of England School, Ifield Community College, Oriel High School, St Wilfrid's Catholic School and Thomas Bennett Community College. There is also an all-through school called The Gatwick School, a free school that opened in 2014. It has a capacity in excess of 1,000 and caters for pupils aged between 4 and 16. The schools at Ifield and Thomas Bennett are also bases for the Local Authority's adult education programmes. Pupils with special needs are educated at the four special schools in the town, each of which covers the full spectrum of needs: Manor Green Primary School, Manor Green College, Serenity School Crawley and Amberley Court School.

Desmond Anderson School in Tilgate converted to Academy status in February 2017 and is now part of the University of Brighton Academies Trust. The Atelier 21 Future School for up to 120 pupils aged 4 to 14 years, based in Broadfield House, opened on 24 August 2020.

Further education is provided by Central Sussex College. Opened in 1958 as Crawley Technical College, it merged with other local colleges to form the new institute in August 2005. The college also provides higher education courses in partnership with the universities at Chichester and Sussex. In 2004, a proposal was made for an additional campus of the University of Sussex to be created in Crawley, but as of 2008 no conclusion has been reached.

== Media ==
Crawley has three local newspapers, of which two have a long history in the area. The Crawley Observer began life in 1881 as Simmins Weekly Advertiser, became the Sussex & Surrey Courier and then the Crawley and District Observer, and took its current name in 1983. The newspaper is now owned by Johnston Press. The Crawley News was first published in 1979, and later took over the operations of the older Crawley Advertiser which closed in 1982. The newspaper was taken over by the Trinity Mirror group in 2015 as part of the purchase of Local World but its last edition was published on 26 October 2016. In September 2008 Johnston Press launched a new weekly broadsheet newspaper called the Crawley Times based on the company's paper produced in Horsham, the West Sussex County Times.

Crawley is served by the London regional versions of BBC and ITV television from the Crystal Palace or Reigate transmitters. Alternatively the town is also well served by BBC South East and ITV Meridian on the Heathfield transmitter and Freesat. This means the town is served by news and television programmes from both London and Tunbridge Wells (where the BBC South East Today studios are situated).

Radio Mercury began broadcasting on 20 October 1984 from Broadfield House in Broadfield. The station was taken over by Global Radio in 2010 and is now part of Heart South (previously Heart Sussex and Surrey), which broadcasts from Brighton.

== Twin towns ==
Crawley is twinned with:

- Eisenhüttenstadt, German Democratic Republic, 1963–1968
- Dorsten, Germany, since 1973
- Alytus, Lithuania, since 2012

== Notable people and music groups ==
Notable people from Crawley

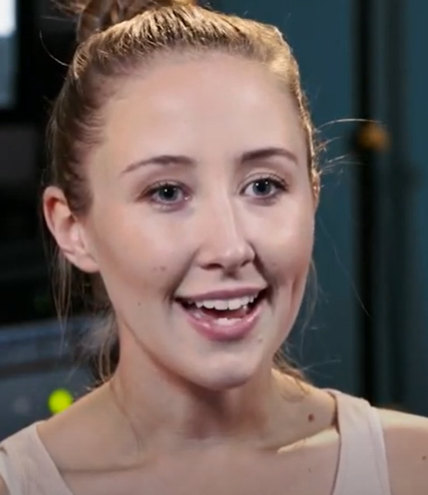
Erin Doherty

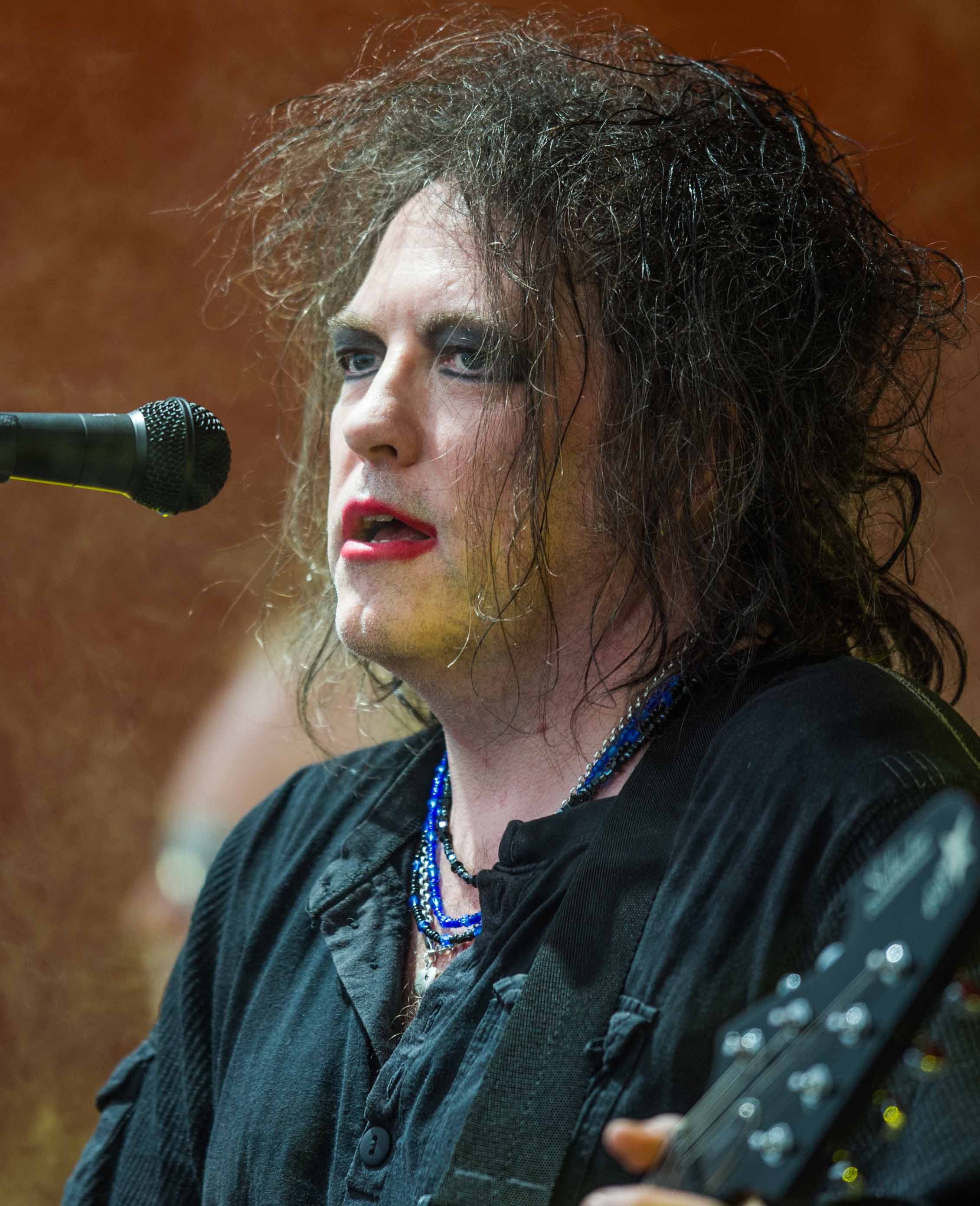
Robert Smith

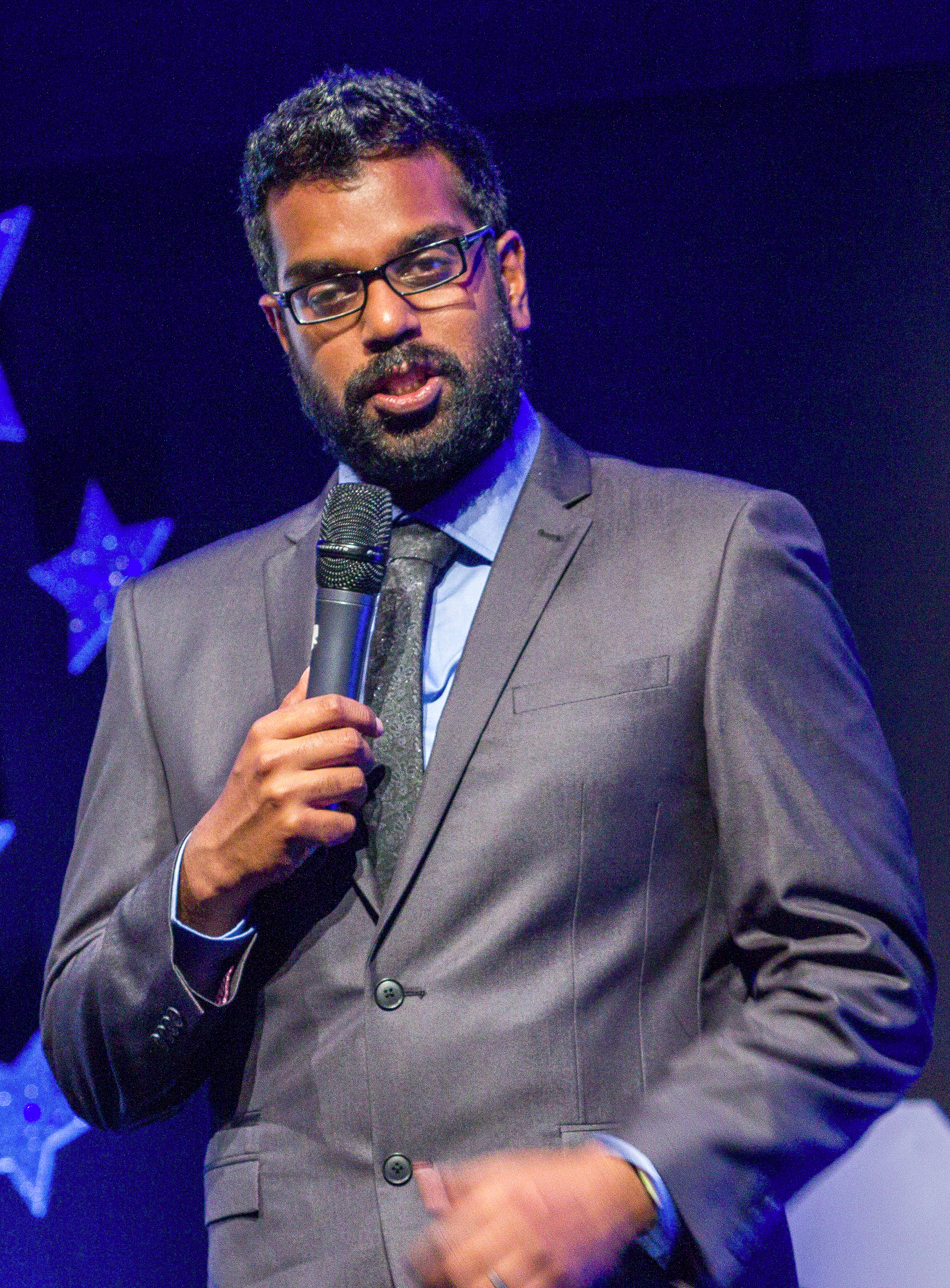
Romesh Ranganathan

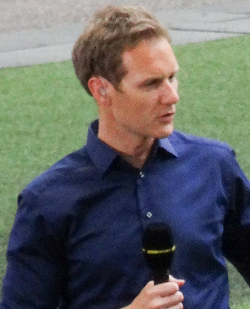
Dan Walker

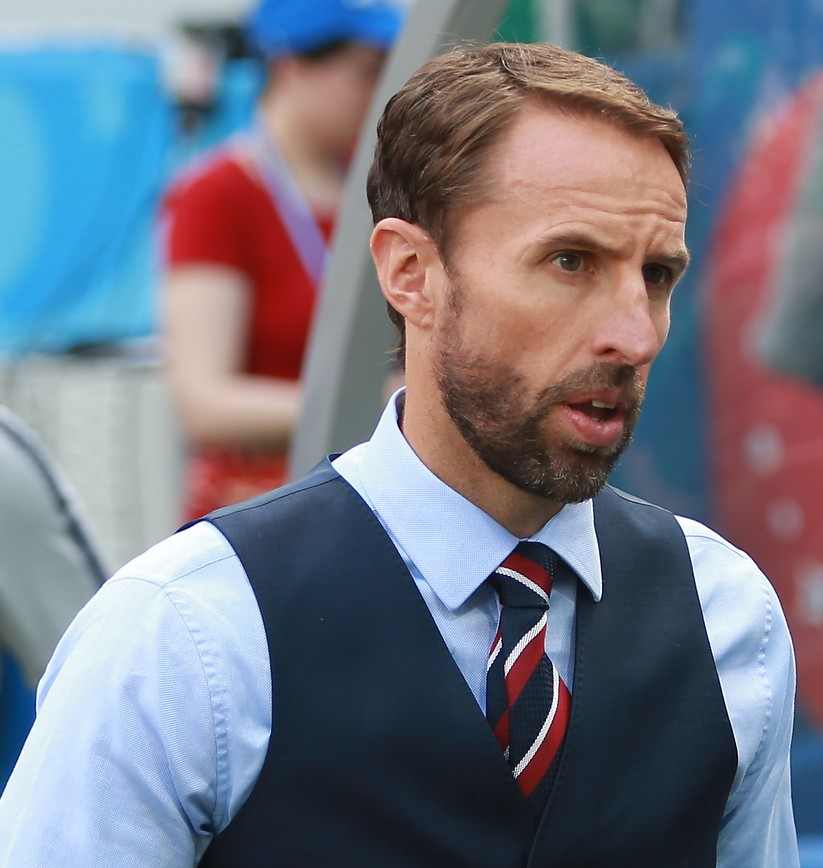
Gareth Southgate

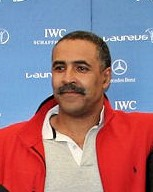
Daley Thompson

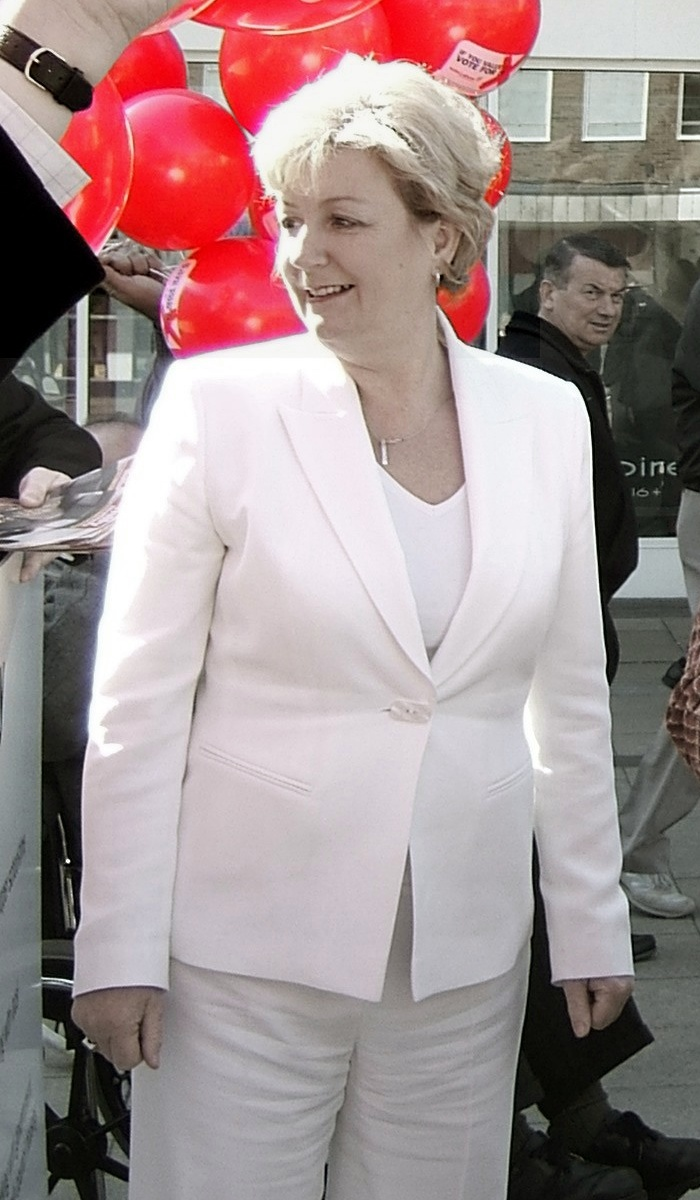
Laura Moffatt
- Simon Calder, travel correspondent for The Independent and freelance contributor to many media channels, including BBC News, was born and raised in Crawley and attended Thomas Bennett Community College.
- Albert Cordingley (1871–1939), first-class cricketer for Sussex (1901–1905) and groundskeeper of the Crawley Bowling and Tennis Clubs (1924–1934), lived in West Green, Crawley from 1921 until his death in 1939.
- Sir Charles Court, the 21st Premier of Western Australia, born in Crawley, migrated to Australia with family before his first birthday
- Spasia Pandora Dinkovski, chef and restaurateur
- Erin Doherty, actress, known for being Princess Anne in The Crown (2019), Chloe (2022), and Adolescence (2025).
- John George Haigh, the "Acid Bath Murderer", carried out some of his murders at a workshop in the West Green area.
- Caroline Haslett (1895-1957), born in Worth, electrical pioneer, engineer and champion of women's rights. Crawley New Town Development Corp' Vice-president (1948)
- Timothy Innes, actor, attended St Wilfrid's Catholic School, was in Harlots (2017), The Last Kingdom (2018–2022), Fallen (2024).
- Leadley (Bethan Mary Leadley), singer-songwriter, music television presenter for 4Music and YouTuber.
- Simon Jeffes, musician and composer was born in Crawley.
- Mark Lemon, first editor of Punch, High Street resident from 1858 until death in 1870. Commemorated by a blue plaque at the George Hotel.
- Jordan Maguire-Drew, professional footballer for Grimsby Town, born in Crawley, played for Oakwood F.C., then Brighton and Hove Albion.
- Alan Minter, boxer won bronze at 1972 Munich Olympics at light middleweight, 1980 was undisputed world middleweight champion.
- Ross Minter, boxer, (son of Alan), was British Boxing Board of Control English Welterweight boxing champion 2005.
- Laura Moffatt, British Labour Party politician who was the Member of Parliament (MP) for Crawley from 1997 until 2010.
- Kevin Muscat, Crawley born footballer, played for Australia (1994–2006), had nine-year spell in UK, playing for four different clubs
- Natasha Pyne, actress, known for The Taming of the Shrew (1967), The Breaking of Bumbo (1970) and Father, Dear Father (1973).

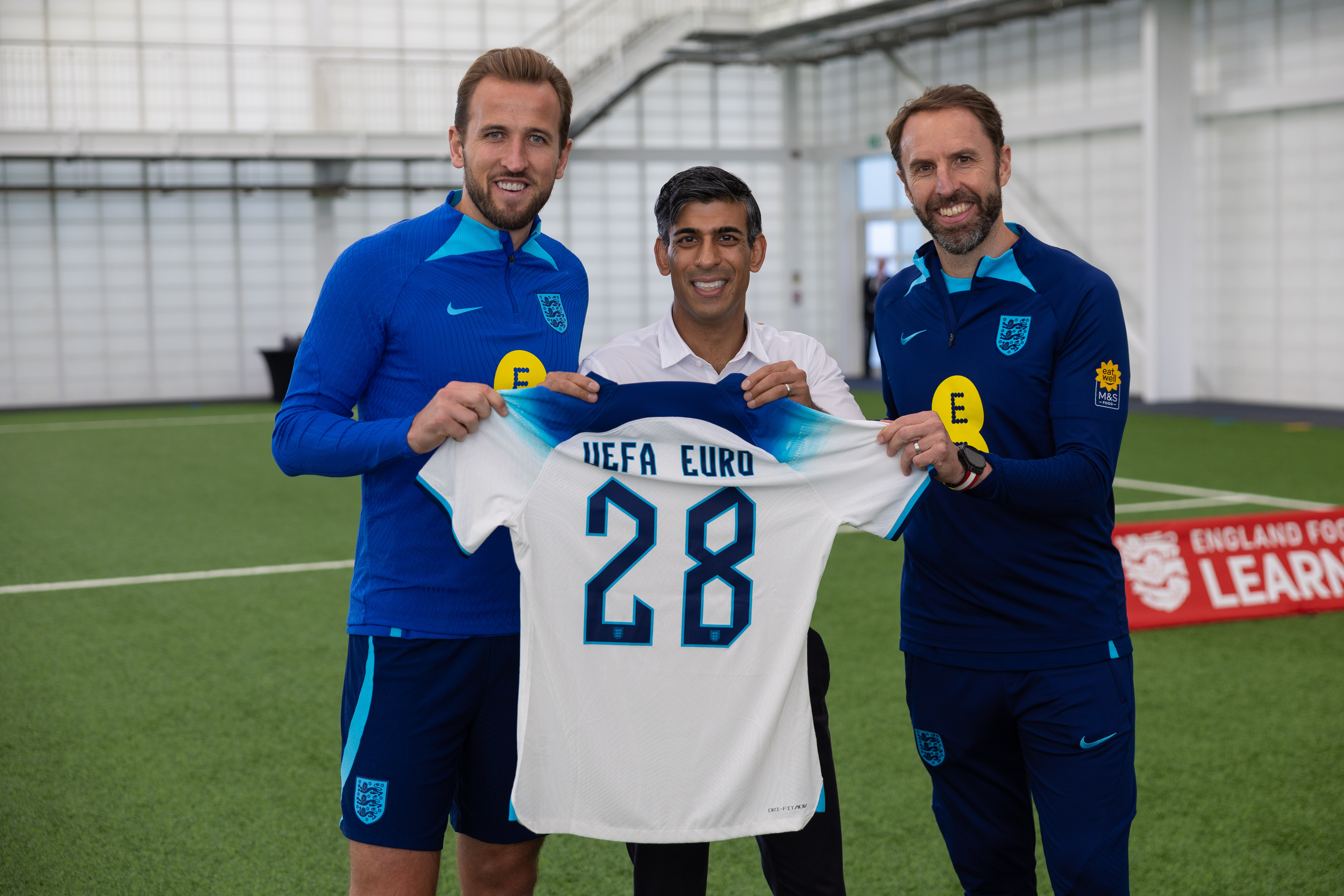
Rishi Sunak at St George's Park with Gareth Southgate and Harry Kane on 10 October 2023

- Romesh Ranganathan, comedian and television personality, was a maths teacher at Hazelwick School and lives in the town.
- Grace Saif, actress, known for Doctors (2000) and the Netflix show 13 Reasons Why.
- Gareth Southgate, former England football player, former England manager (2016–2024), reached 2018 FIFA World Cup semi-final and two Euro finals, losing both.
- Daley Thompson, athlete, winner of two Decathlon Olympic gold medals, trained in Crawley for the Olympics in 1980 and 1984.
- David Tong, theoretical physicist with research focus in quantum field theory. Known for his lecture notes on a wide variety of topics in physics.
- Peter Vaughan, actor, Straw Dogs (1971), Grouty in Porridge (1979) and Maester Aemon Targaryen in Game of Thrones (2011–2015), lived in Crawley between 1966-1985
- Dan Walker, BBC breakfast presenter, former sports presenter, born and raised in Crawley.
- The Cure, a rock band, formed in Crawley in 1976 by Robert Smith, Michael Dempsey and Lol Tolhurst, all of whom attended St Wilfrid's Roman Catholic School.
- The Feeling's drummer Paul Stewart, guitarist Kevin Jeremiah and keyboard player Ciaran Jeremiah were also at St Wilfrid's.
- Brett Marvin and the Thunderbolts were formed in Crawley in 1968 at the Thomas Bennett School.

== See also ==
- List of places of worship in Crawley
- Urban planning
- West Sussex
- Worth Church
- City Place Gatwick

== Bibliography ==
- Bastable, Roger (2004). Crawley. Then & Now. Stroud: Tempus Publishing. ISBN 978-0-7524-3063-8. OCLC 53242919.
- Bennett, Thomas P. (1949). New Towns Act 1946: Reports of the Aycliffe, Crawley, Harlow, Hatfield, Hemel Hempstead, Peterlee, Stevenage and Welwyn Garden City Development Corporations for period ending 31 March 1949. Crawley Development Corporation: Second Annual Report (Report). Her Majesty's Stationery Office. OCLC 52186166.
- Berger, Stefan; LaPorte, Norman (2010). Friendly Enemies: Britain and the GDR, 1949–1990. Berghan Books. ISBN 978-1-84545-697-9.
- Body, Geoffrey (1984). Railways of the Southern Region. PSL Field Guide. Cambridge: Patrick Stephens. ISBN 978-0-85059-664-9. OCLC 11496293.
- Brandon, Peter (2003). The Kent and Sussex Weald. Chichester: Phillimore & Company. ISBN 1-86077-241-2.
- Cole, Belinda (2004a). Crawley: A History and Celebration of the Town. Salisbury: Frith Book Company. ISBN 978-1-904938-19-4. OCLC 59137480.
- Cole, Belinda (2004b). Crawley: An Illustrated Miscellany. Salisbury: Frith Book Company. ISBN 978-1-904938-74-3. OCLC 59137646.
- Crawley Borough Council (1997). Crawley: Official Guide. Wallington: Local Authority Publishing Co Ltd.
- Gray, Fred, ed. (1983). Crawley: Old Town, New Town. Occasional Papers (University of Sussex, Centre for Continuing Education), no. 18. Falmer: University of Sussex. ISBN 978-0-904242-21-8. OCLC 16599642.
- Green, Jeffrey; Allen, Peter (1993). Crawley New Town in old photographs. Stroud: Alan Sutton Publishing. ISBN 978-0-7509-0472-8. OCLC 30026985.
- Gwynne, Peter (1990). A History of Crawley. Chichester: Phillimore & Company. ISBN 978-0-85033-718-1. OCLC 59815249.
- Kraemer-Johnson, Glyn; Bishop, John (2005). Southdown Days. Hersham: Ian Allan Publishing. ISBN 978-0-7110-3077-0. OCLC 60837945.
- Lowerson, John, ed. (1980). Crawley: Victorian New Town. Occasional Papers (University of Sussex, Centre for Continuing Education), no. 12. Falmer: University of Sussex. ISBN 978-0-904242-14-0. OCLC 16563480.
- Mitchell, Vic; Smith, Keith (1986a). Three Bridges to Brighton. Southern Main Lines. Midhurst: Middleton Press. ISBN 978-0-906520-35-2. OCLC 60024136.
- Mitchell, Vic; Smith, Keith (1986b). Crawley to Littlehampton. Southern Main Lines. Midhurst: Middleton Press. ISBN 978-0-906520-34-5. OCLC 60024134.
- s.n. (1839). Pigot's Directory of Sussex. London and Manchester: Pigot & Co. WSC13002. Archived from the original on 11 June 2011.
