= List of schools in Crawley, West Sussex =

Education in Crawley, West Sussex is co-ordinated by West Sussex County Council. Since 2004, provision for compulsory education has been made wholly through primary and secondary schools, following the closure of the town's Middle schools earlier that year. Each neighbourhood in the town has at least one Primary school, while Secondary schools are distributed around the town on larger campuses.

== Primary schools ==
Name	Image	Neighbourhood/ Coordinates	Age Range	Approximate Roll	Notes
Bewbush Academy		Bewbush; 51°6′9.62″N 0°13′19.67″W	4–11	450	The school is housed in the former buildings of Bewbush County Middle School. The predecessor schools were Bewbush County First School and Bewbush County Middle School opening in Bewbush in 1978 and 1982 respectively. These schools merged to become Bewbush Community Primary School in 2004, becoming an academy in April 2012.
Broadfield Primary Academy		Broadfield; 51°5′54.25″N 0°11′51.57″W	3–11	575	Broadfield East First School was opened on the site in 1978 to serve the extending neighbourhood of Broadfield, with the Middle School opening in adjacent buildings in 1986. The schools were altered to cover the infant and junior ranges in 2004. Following academisation in 2012, the two schools combined under the current name in September 2016.
The Brook Infant School		Maidenbower; 51°6′12.75″N 0°9′18.31″W	4–7	190	Opened in 1999 as a First school feeding into Maidenbower Middle. The school became an Infant school in 2004.
Desmond Anderson Primary Academy		Tilgate; 51°5′55.8″N 0°11′16.15″W	4–11	320	Opened as an Infant school in 1958, with a Junior department opening the following year. It became First and Middle schools in 1971, with the two merging in 1992. The school became a Primary again in 2004, opening in new buildings in 2005. The school converted to academy status in February 2017 and became part of the University of Brighton Academies Trust.
Forge Wood Primary School		Forge Wood; 51°8′17.81″N 0°9′6.37″W	4–11	90	Opened in 2016 as an academy, with a single Reception class, with the intention to grow to a 420-place primary school by 2022.
Gossops Green Primary School		Gossops Green; 51°6′36.2″N 0°12′52.63″W	4–11	500	Opened in 2004 following the closure of the predecessor schools Gossops Green County Infant (opened 1968) and Gossops Green County Junior (opened 1969).
Hilltop Primary School		Southgate; 51°6′20.83″N 0°11′44.19″W	4–11	290	Formed following the closure of Southgate West First and Southgate West Middle schools in 2004, having previously opened in 1969 and 1970 respectively. The school became an academy in September 2012.
Langley Green Primary School		Langley Green; 51°7′37.73″N 0°11′52.92″W	4–11	300	Formed in 2004 from the closure of the separate First and Middle Schools, previously opened as Infant and Junior Schools in 1954, with the Infant school moving to a separate campus in 1979 when it merged with the Jordans Infant school already on that site.
Maidenbower Infant School		Maidenbower; 51°6′29.73″N 0°9′7.57″W	4–7	270	Maidenbower First School opened in 1992 to serve the new neighbourhood of Maidenbower. Pupils attended until the age of 8, but no middle school was opened until 1999. In the schools' reorganisation of 2004 the First school became an Infant school with nursery.
Maidenbower Junior School		Maidenbower; 51°6′28.59″N 0°9′3.17″W	7–11	580	A 5-form-entry Junior school in 2004, having previously opened as Maidenbower Middle School in 1999.
The Mill Primary Academy		Ifield; 51°7′0.69″N 0°12′50.93″W	4–11	330	Opened in 2004 following the closures of predecessor schools Ifield First School and Ifield Middle School. The two schools had moved to a campus at Ifield Drive from former buildings in Rusper Road where they had opened in 1956, with the Middle School moving when changing from a Junior school in 1985, and the First school following in 2001. It became an academy in September 2013 (TKAT).
Milton Mount Primary School		Pound Hill; 51°7′32.4″N 0°9′24.37″W	4–11	440	Opened in 1972 as a combined First and Middle school. It became primary in 2004.
Northgate Primary School		Northgate; 51°7′19.31″N 0°11′0″W	4–11	420	A temporary primary school was opened in Northgate in 1952 to accommodate young children in the New town. Formal Infant and Junior Schools were opened in 1954 on Barnfield Road, becoming First and Middle schools respectively in 1971. The schools closed in 2004 with a new Northgate Primary School opening in the joined buildings.
The Oaks Primary School		Tilgate; 51°6′12″N 0°10′32.35″W	4–11	390	Formed in 1997 from the merger of two previous schools with varied histories. The first school to be opened in Tilgate had been the Bishop Bell Infant School in 1958 with the Junior school opening in 1959. First and Middle Schools were opened in Furnace Green under the name of Robert May schools. Each school lost one section in 1979, with the remaining sections closing in 1997 to be replaced by The Oaks Primary School. The school became an academy in September 2012.
Our Lady Queen of Heaven Roman Catholic (Voluntary Aided) Primary School		Langley Green; 51°7′35.31″N 0°12′12.93″W	4–11	360	Opened in 1957. In 1970 the school became a First school feeding into the local catholic Middle schools. Full primary status was restored when the middle schools were closed in 1997.
Pound Hill Infant School		Pound Hill; 51°7′10.37″N 0°9′13.98″W	4–7	700	Opened in 1955 as part of Pound Hill Junior and Infants School, relocating in 1957. The infant department became a First school in 1971, reverting to Infant school in 2004.
Pound Hill Junior School		Pound Hill; 51°7′8.96″N 0°9′18.5″W	7–11	350	Also part of Pound Hill Junior and Infants School. The junior department became a Middle school in 1971, reverting to Junior school in 2004.
St Andrew's Church of England (Voluntary Aided)Primary School		Furnace Green; 51°6′29.58″N 0°10′6.16″W	4–11	200	Opened in 1969 adjacent to the St Andrew's Church in Furnace Green. It was extended to become a First and Middle school in the early 1970s. This change was reverted in 2004.
St Francis of Assisi Roman Catholic (Voluntary Aided Primary School		Southgate; 51°6′31.11″N 0°10′58.92″W	4–11	420	Opened in 1950. It was re-housed in its current buildings in 1956 before coming a First school in 1971 feeding into the Holy Cross and Notre Dame middle schools. Full primary status was returned in 1997.
St Margaret's Church of England (Voluntary Aided) Primary School		Ifield; 51°7′17.13″N 0°12′25.44″W	4–11	410	Opened as a Junior and Infants school in 1955 to replace former schools in the then villages of Crawley and Ifield.
Seymour Primary School		Broadfield; 51°5′57.74″N 0°12′22.97″W	4–11	460	Originally opened in 1971 as Broadfield North County First and Middle School. In 1998 the school adopted the new name of Seymour First & Middle School, before being adapted to a primary school in 2004 and then converting to academy status in September 2012.
Southgate Primary School		Southgate; 51°6′19.08″N 0°11′24.65″W	4–11	470	Opened as a Junior and Infants school in 1956, becoming First and Middle in the early 1970s. The two schools were merged in 2004 to form the current primary school.
Three Bridges Infant School		Three Bridges; 51°7′4.86″N 0°10′11.49″W	4–7	190	Opened as part of a primary school before the building of the New Town in the 1950s. In the 1960s the Infant department was separated, becoming a First school in 1971. The school became an Infant school in 2004, following considerable opposition to a proposed merger with the adjoining middle school to form a primary school.
Three Bridges Junior School		Three Bridges; 51°7′1.32″N 0°10′25.94″W	7–11	230	Also part of the primary school before the 1950s. Following the 1960s separation the school became a Middle school in 1971, and then a Junior school again in 2004.
Waterfield Primary School		Bewbush; 51°6′28.68″N 0°13′30.71″W	4–11	210	Opened in January 1985 as a First school catering for pupils aged between 5 and 8. A nursery school was opened in the early 1990s, and the school became a through primary school in September 2004.
West Green Primary School		West Green51°7′7.09″N 0°11′49.75″W	4–11	208	Was the first school to be opened in the New town in 1951. The Junior department was closed in 1985 when the school became a First school. Full primary status was restored in 2004, following the scrapping of proposals to close the school.

== Secondary schools ==
Name	Image	Neighbourhood/ Coordinates	Age Range	Approximate Roll	Notes
Hazelwick School		Three Bridges; 51°7′30.51″N 0°9′54.11″W	11–18	1890	Opened as a Secondary modern school in 1953, becoming comprehensive in the early 1960s. It is currently the largest school in West Sussex.
Holy Trinity Church of England (Voluntary Aided) School		Gossops Green; 51°6′20″N 0°12′35.02″W	11–18	1300	Opened in Gossops Green in 1967, with an official opening by The Queen in 1969. It operated initially with two stages of entry: in Year 7 for primary schools around Crawley and Year 8 for pupils transferring from Crawley Middle schools. This was changed in 2004 to entry at age 11 for all pupils.
Ifield Community College		Ifield; 51°7′3.55″N 0°12′36.25″W	11–18	950	The Ifield campus originally was home to Sarah Robinson Secondary Modern School and Ifield County Grammar School, opening in 1955 and 1956 respectively. The two schools merged to become a comprehensive in 1966.
Oriel High School		Maidenbower; 51°6′21.22″N 0°9′30.78″W	11–18	1100	Opened in 2004 as part of a Private Finance Initiative arrangement linked to the change in age of transfer in Crawley Schools. Initially the school accommodated pupils aged 11 to 13, gradually extending with the expectation of becoming an 11-18 school with Sixth form by 2009.
St Wilfrid's Roman Catholic (Voluntary Aided) School		Southgate; 51°6′37.41″N 0°12′14.86″W	11–18	880	Opened in 1952. In 1970 it became an Upper school accepting pupils from local catholic middle schools at age 13. From 1997 it reverted to the full secondary age range.
Thomas Bennett Community College		Tilgate; 51°5′56.82″N 0°11′25.11″W	11–18	1320	Opened as a Comprehensive school in 1958 on a split campus in Tilgate. It was moved into new buildings in 2005.

== All-through schools ==
Name	Image	Neighbourhood/ Coordinates	Age Range	Approximate Roll	Notes
The Gatwick School		Manor Royal; 51°8′19.11″N 0°9′47.68″W	4–16	340	Opened in 2014 as a Free School

== Special Educational Needs School ==
Name	Image	Neighbourhood/ Coordinates	Age Range	Approximate Roll	Notes
Manor Green Primary School		Ifield; 51°7′12.55″N 0°12′31.74″W	2–11	110	Formed in 2004 following the closure of schools at Catherington and Deerswood
Manor Green College		Ifield; 51°7′12.55″N 0°12′31.74″W	11–19	160	Shares a campus on Crawley Avenue with Ifield mainstream schools.

== Further education ==
Each of the local Secondary schools has a Sixth form attached. Further education is also provided at Central Sussex College formerly opened as Crawley Technical College in 1958.

== Former schools ==
Note: where schools have been replaced by a school with a comparable name, these are not recorded, e.g. Bewbush Middle School is now Bewbush Primary School.

Name	Status	Open Date	Closure Date	Notes
Bishop Bell First School	Infant / First	1958	1979	Infant until 1974. Closed in 1979 with pupils transferring to the nearby Robert May First school.
Bishop Bell Middle School	Junior / Middle	1958	1997	Junior until 1974. Received pupils from closed Robert May Middle school from 1979–1997. Closed as part of merger to form The Oaks Primary in 1997.
Broadfield East Infant School	Infant / First	1978	2016	Separate infant (formerly first) school merged with neighbouring junior to form Broadfield Primary Academy.
Broadfield East Junior School	Junior / Middle	1986	2016	Separate junior (formerly middle) school merged with neighbouring infant to form Broadfield Primary Academy.
Catherington Special School	Special School	1971	2004	Formerly a school for children aged 2–19 with severe learning difficulties. Merged with Deerswood in 2004, to form Manor Green special schools for wide spectrum disabilities.
Deerswood Special School	Special School	1958	2004	Formerly a school for children aged 2–19 with moderate learning difficulties. Merged with Catherington in 2004, to form Manor Green special schools for wide spectrum disabilities.
Holy Cross Roman Catholic School	Intermediate	1970	1996	Moved to new buildings in Ifield in the early 1980s but closed in 1996 when the diocese reverted to two-tier education.
Ifield First School	Infant / First	1956	2004	Opened in Rusper Road, relocating to share the Middle school campus in 2001, before closing in 2004 as part of age of transfer changes. Replaced by The Mill Primary school.
Ifield Middle School	Junior / Middle	1956	2004	Opened in Rusper Road, relocating to the former Henry Pelham campus of Ifield School in 1985 on becoming a middle school. Closed as part of age of transfer changes. Replaced by The Mill Primary school.
Jordans Junior & Infant School	Primary school	1958	1979	Merged with Langley Green Infant school, remaining on its site at Martyr's Avenue.
Notre Dame Roman Catholic School	Intermediate	1968	1996	Opened as a girls' secondary school, but by 1970 became a middle-deemed-secondary school for pupils aged 9 to 13. The school closed as part of the diocese's decision to reorganise schools locally.
Robert May First School	Infant / First	1964	1997	Opened as Robert May County Junior and Infants School. Became First in 1974. Closed in 1997 in merger to form The Oaks Primary School.
Robert May Middle School	Junior / Middle	1964	1979	Opened as Robert May County Junior and Infants School. Became Middle in 1974, closing in 1979, pupils transferring to Bishop Bell Middle School.
Sarah Robinson Secondary Modern School	Secondary	1956	1966	Closed upon merger with Ifield Grammar school to form comprehensive.
Discovery New School	Primary	2011	2014	Founded in 2010 and opened in September 2011 in a fully refurbished Broadfield House, a Grade II-listed villa in Broadfield Park. It was a Free school run in line with Montessori educational principles. It was the first free school in England to close in 2014.
