= Ifield Water Mill =

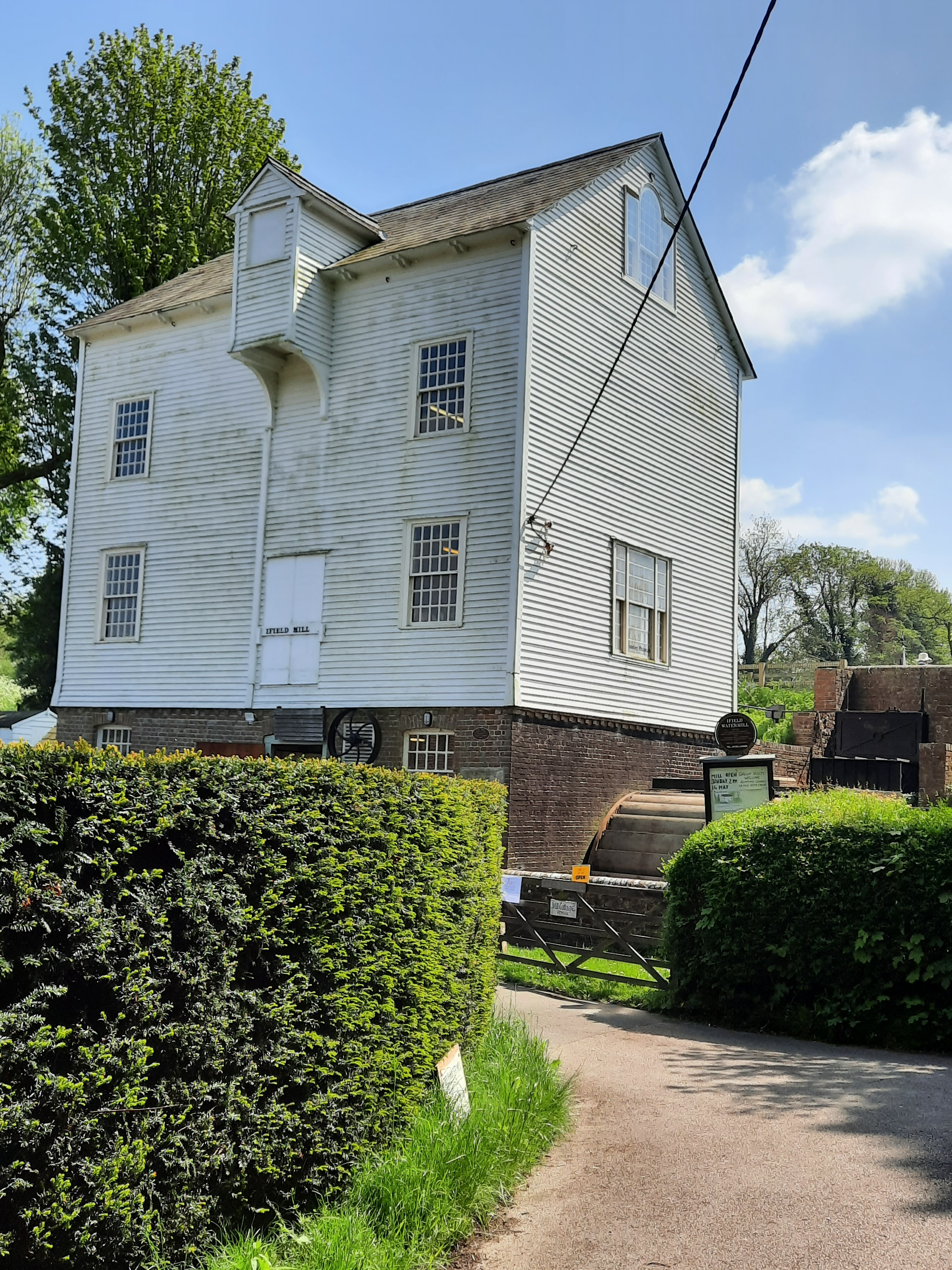
- The mill from the northeast, May 2023

- Location within Crawley
- 51°06′49″N 0°13′21″W
- Location: Hyde Drive, Ifield West, Crawley, West Sussex RH11 0PL, United Kingdom

History
- Built: 1817 (present building)
- Built for: Thomas Durrant

Site notes
- Architectural style: Weatherboarded Vernacular

Listed Building – Grade II
- Official name: Ifield Water Mill
- Designated: 21 June 1948
- Reference no.: 1207630

Ifield Water Mill is a 19th-century weatherboarded watermill in the Ifield neighbourhood of Crawley, a town and borough in West Sussex, England. Built on the site of an earlier, smaller flour mill, which itself replaced an iron forge—one of many in the Crawley area—it fell into disuse in the 1930s. The local council, which acquired the land for housing development in the 1970s, leased the mill to local enthusiasts, who restored it to working order. The mill and an associated house are listed buildings, and there is also a cottage (not listed) on the site.

== History of the site ==
The area around Ifield was originally thickly wooded, forming part of St Leonard's Forest. Small brooks and tributaries of the River Mole run through the soil, which is an area of Weald clay between the sandier soil to the south and a narrow outcrop of limestone further north. At least one mill had been established in the village by the 13th century, although this was further north. No records of its ownership survive, but tithe documents refer to it several times and it may have belonged to the Lord of the Manor.

An iron forge existed on the site by the late 16th century. The Lord of the Manor owned the section of Ifield Brook (a tributary of the Mole) which ran from the furnace at nearby Bewbush, 1 mile (1.6 km) to the southwest. The brook was dammed in the 16th century to form a mill pond, which provided power for the forge. By 1606, "a house, barn, mill, mill pond and two crofts of land known as Ifield Mill and Ifield Mill Pond" (Note: Quoted in the deeds of the mill.) had been established. The Middletons, a rich local family who owned many ironworks across Sussex, leased the mill and its associated buildings. They were also tenants of the Bewbush furnace.

The Sussex iron industry declined quickly in the mid-17th century. Bewbush furnace closed in 1642 because the area had been completely deforested and there was no more wood to use for fuel; the following year, as the English Civil War raged, Parliamentarians overran the area and destroyed all remnants of the industry. The site of Ifield forge was cleared, and a corn mill was built in its place. (At the time, the generic name "mill" was used to describe forges, and their operators were called "millers" or "farmers". This makes it difficult to determine exactly when the change happened.) It was definitely operating by 1660, when a local Quaker, William Garton, operated it. He was regularly imprisoned for his religious beliefs over the next 25 years, even though Ifield was a hotbed of Nonconformism (being the site of one of the first Quaker meeting houses in the world).

The mill was a small-scale operation at first, but as the milling process became more efficient it was able to expand. It was rebuilt in 1683. The Middleton family owned the mill and its associated buildings outright by this time; another prosperous local businessman, Leonard Gale, bought it in 1715. By 1759 it had passed out of his family and began a 50-year period in which various combinations of partners owned it. By this time it was the largest corn mill in the area; when Napoleon threatened to invade the United Kingdom, a survey was undertaken to determine the output of all mills, which found that Ifield Mill could supply 16 sacks of flour and 120 loaves of bread each day. Other local mills could manage no more than four sacks per day.

Despite its efficient output, the mill fell into disuse in the 1810s after London-based businessman Abraham Goldsmid bought it in 1809. It lay unused for eight years until Thomas Durrant, a miller from nearby Merstham, bought it for £1,200 in 1817. Durrant was the first owner who also acted as miller, and under his ownership the mill was completely rebuilt.

== Reconstruction ==
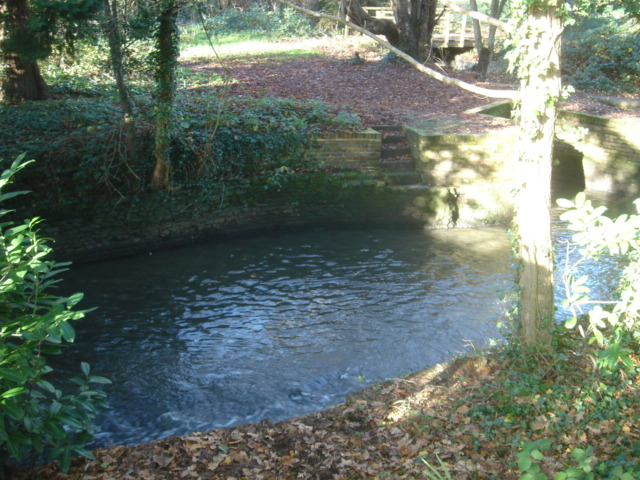
Ifield Brook as it flows into the mill pond

The 1683 building was demolished and the structure which stands today was built in its place. A decorative stone tablet with the date 1683 and the initials of Thomas Middleton and his wife Mary was salvaged and mounted on the exterior. (Middleton was the owner at the time of the 1683 rebuilding.) Thomas Durrant spent £3,500 on construction. This money came from successful litigation against a group of miners whose actions damaged the water supply to his mill at Merstham and rendered it useless; a similar problem started to affect the Ifield mill soon after it was rebuilt. The water supply began to fail as the brook's flow became weaker, and in 1848 the mill pond was cut in half by the building of the railway line to Horsham. This originally crossed it on a bridge, but an embankment soon replaced it. Also, in 1837, a competing windmill had been built near the centre of the village, and two other millers were recorded in Ifield parish by 1821. Gradual decline continued throughout the 19th and 20th centuries; the mill passed through many owners, and even one long-established family of owner-millers, the Hardings, struggled. A steam engine driven by a waterwheel had been installed, but the engine often had to be worked manually because the water power was so feeble. The mill was no longer in use by 1927, and it was put up for sale with the adjacent Mill Cottage in 1934. Described as "a gentleman's residence with a picturesque disused water mill", it was clear that the mill's importance had ebbed away.

== Restoration ==
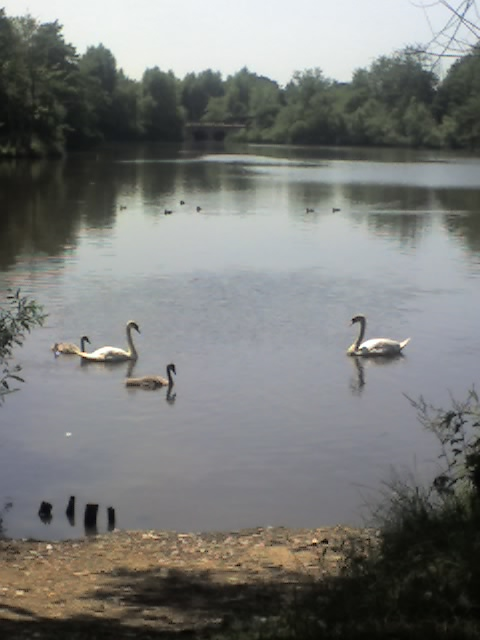
Looking south over the mill pond

The mill stood unused, apart from for storage, and nominally for sale until Crawley Borough Council used a compulsory purchase order to buy it in 1974. The council was acquiring land on the edge of Ifield for housing. It allowed a group of volunteers to attempt to restore the mill, which was in poor structural condition. Work started on 15 June 1974.

All parts of the structure were affected by the neglect and long period of disuse. Trees had invaded the building, dislodging the roof; the main timbers holding the building up were rotting and needed replacement; a retaining wall had collapsed inwards; and the water wheel, while still sound, was embedded in the mud. The work took eight years—much longer than the original estimate of three, although large donations of money paid for many interior fittings which had not been taken into account. Three staircases, the board cladding on the inside walls and the wooden floors were all renewed, and all windows were refitted to their original design. On the exterior, the weatherboarding was removed and a layer of waterproof cladding installed. Much of the boardwork had to be replaced, although the original appearance was preserved. The roof was also repaired inside and out to prevent it decaying any further.

Replacing the load-bearing timbers and supports was particularly difficult. The whole building had to be lifted with hydraulic jacks and suspended aloft temporarily while new timbers were installed. Work on the water wheel and its surrounding brick structure was also difficult and took several years. Parts of the wheel were salvaged and incorporated into the rebuilt oak and steel structure. The walls supporting it were totally rebuilt at the same time. A sluice gate was built across the mill pond, and a flow control mechanism was brought in from the disused Hammonds Mill in Burgess Hill, also in West Sussex. The wheel is of the overshot type—the largest such wheel in Sussex—weighs around 6 long tons (6.1 t; 6.7 short tons), has a diameter of 11 feet (3.4 m) and can rotate at between 8 and 15 revolutions per minute depending on water flow.

Despite its scale and the difficulty of many of the tasks, the restoration was carried out almost entirely by volunteers working mostly at weekends. Some unemployed people enrolled in a job creation programme were briefly used, but no professional engineers, construction personnel or other qualified workers were employed at any time during the eight-year process. The wooden parts of the waterwheel in this reconstruction rotted after about 30 years, so with some financial help from the Lottery Heritage Fund a new waterwheel was constructed in steel.

Efforts have been made to improve the ecological and wildlife balance of the mill pond and the surrounding area. The northern part of the pond had to be drained in 1976 during the reconstruction work, and trees started to become established in the bed; the part south of the railway line, meanwhile, was described as a "virtual desert" ecologically. By 1979, however, it had been restocked with more than 30,000 fish, and birds quickly became established again: a study recorded 58 species. The soil is considered to be of good quality, which improves the chances of suitable vegetation becoming established.

== Architecture ==
Ifield Water Mill is a tall, externally weatherboarded structure of three storeys, consisting of a brick-built ground floor and two gabled upper floors of timber. The slate roof has eaves carried out beyond the walls on brackets. The mill hoist, whose surrounding timberwork and brickwork was found to be very badly corroded during the restoration, projects from the north face.

== Current activities ==
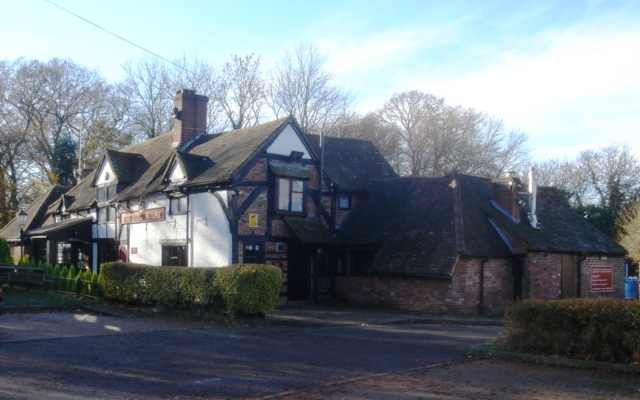
Ifield Mill House

Ifield Water Mill was listed at Grade II by English Heritage on 21 June 1948. It is one of 79 Grade II structures, and 100 listed buildings of all grades, in the Borough of Crawley. The Borough Council still own the building, but it is leased to Crawley Museum Society. Before Crawley Museum was established in Goffs Park in the Southgate neighbourhood, a temporary museum and exhibition was housed in the mill.

The mill house and cottage were also bought by the council as part of their land acquisition programme, and have been leased to private tenants since then. The mill house, a 16th-century half-timbered building with modern additions in brick, is now a public house. It has an original tiled hipped roof, but much of the building was remodelled in the 20th century in the style of the old structure. It was listed at Grade II on 1 May 1974. The cottage is not listed separately by English Heritage. It was built in the 16th or 17th century as a barn, but was converted to residential use in the 1930s.

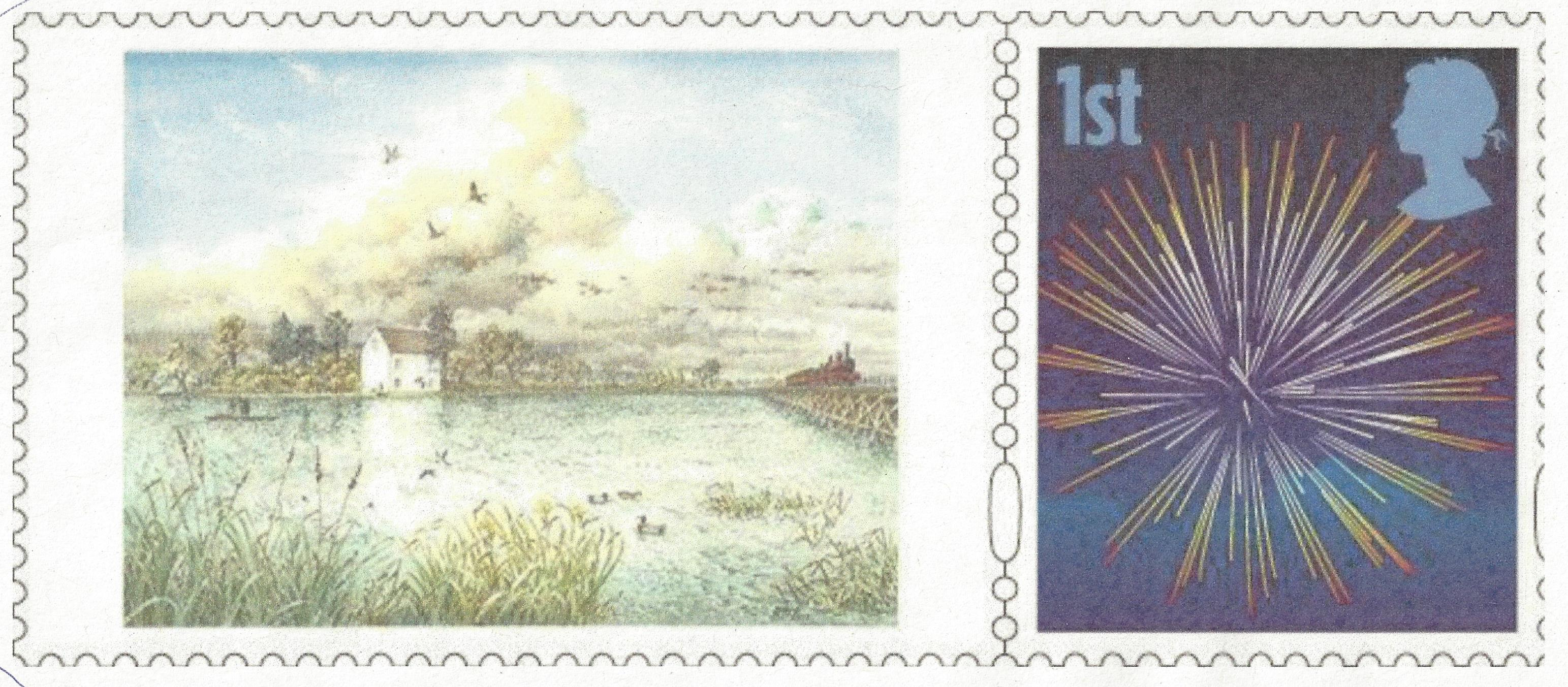
The painting of Ifield Mill by Denys Ovenden (circa 1848 - showing a Jenny Lind steam train crossing the wooden trellis viaduct across the millpond en route from Crawley to Horsham) was used to create a Royal Mail postage stamp.

An illustration of the water mill was painted by the artist, Denys Ovenden, in 2015 and shows a scene from 1848 when the railway between Crawley and Horsham crossed the millpond on a wooden trellis viaduct. The painting subsequently appeared on a limited edition Royal Mail postage stamp.

== Bibliography ==
- Bracher, P. (1994). Ifield Water Mill: its Owners and Occupiers. Publication Number 3. Crawley: Crawley Museum Society.
- Gibson-Hill, J.; Henbery, E.W. (1979). Ifield Mill: a Survey. Crawley: Crawley Museum Society.
- Henbery, E.W. (1996). Ifield Mill Restoration (6th ed.). Crawley: Crawley Museum Society.
- Nairn, Ian; Pevsner, Nikolaus (1965). The Buildings of England: Sussex. Harmondsworth: Penguin Books. ISBN 0-14-071028-0.
