= Southgate, West Sussex =

Area of Crawley, England

Coordinates: 51.1078°N 0.1918°W

Southgate
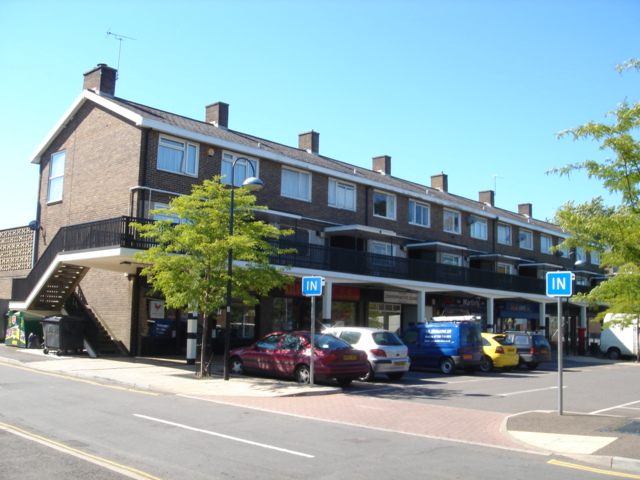
- The 1950s shopping parade at Wakehurst Drive, Southgate East

- Location within West Sussex
- Population: 8,106
- OS grid reference: TQ265365
- District: Crawley
- Shire county: West Sussex
- Region: South East
- Country: England
- Sovereign state: United Kingdom
- Post town: CRAWLEY
- Postcode district: RH10, RH11
- Dialling code: 01293
- Police: Sussex
- Fire: West Sussex
- Ambulance: South East Coast
- UK Parliament: Crawley

Southgate is one of the 14 residential neighbourhoods in Crawley, a town and borough in West Sussex, England. Crawley was planned and laid out as a New Town after the Second World War, based on the principle of self-contained neighbourhoods surrounding a town centre of civic and commercial buildings. Southgate was one of the four in the "inner ring" closest to the town centre, and was intended to be the largest of the nine designed in the original master plan. It was built in two stages between the 1950s and the 1970s, but retains some older buildings from before the New Town era and has "significant areas of pre-New Town character".

The area was settled by pre-Roman people, and industrial and other artefacts from that era were found during construction of the neighbourhood. In the 19th century, after Crawley was connected to the national railway network, housing developed south of the line around the Brighton Road, which divides the modern neighbourhood in two. New Town-era expansion produced a large residential area with a high proportion of terraced houses and a range of schools, places of worship and community facilities; but some historic buildings and areas of open space remain, including an award-winning park. The population at the time of the United Kingdom Census 2011 was 8,533.

== History ==
In the century before the Romans arrived in Britain, the area now covered by West Sussex was ruled by the Atrebates, a Belgic tribe led by Commius. They were found to have been present in the area now covered by Southgate when building work took place in 1969. The Southgate West development was underway on land covered by Hogs Hill Farm, which occupied a ridge of land between the Horsham and Brighton Roads. Land clearance revealed two ditches filled with debris such as bones and pieces of pottery. The next year, a large house on Horsham Road was demolished to make way for a new road of houses; the builders discovered similar pits, and the remains were identified as pre-Roman using carbon dating techniques. The remains of crucibles, slag and other ironworking materials were also discovered; these were confirmed as being from the same era, the 2nd and 1st centuries BC. It was later confirmed that the Hogs Hill Farm remains dated from the Roman era, meaning that the ironmaking and pottery-producing activities of the Atrebates were continued by their conquerors. By the time the excavations and investigation finished, evidence of three iron bloomeries, a small flint mine, roof tiles (possibly from a building on the site) and many pieces of pottery had been found and catalogued.

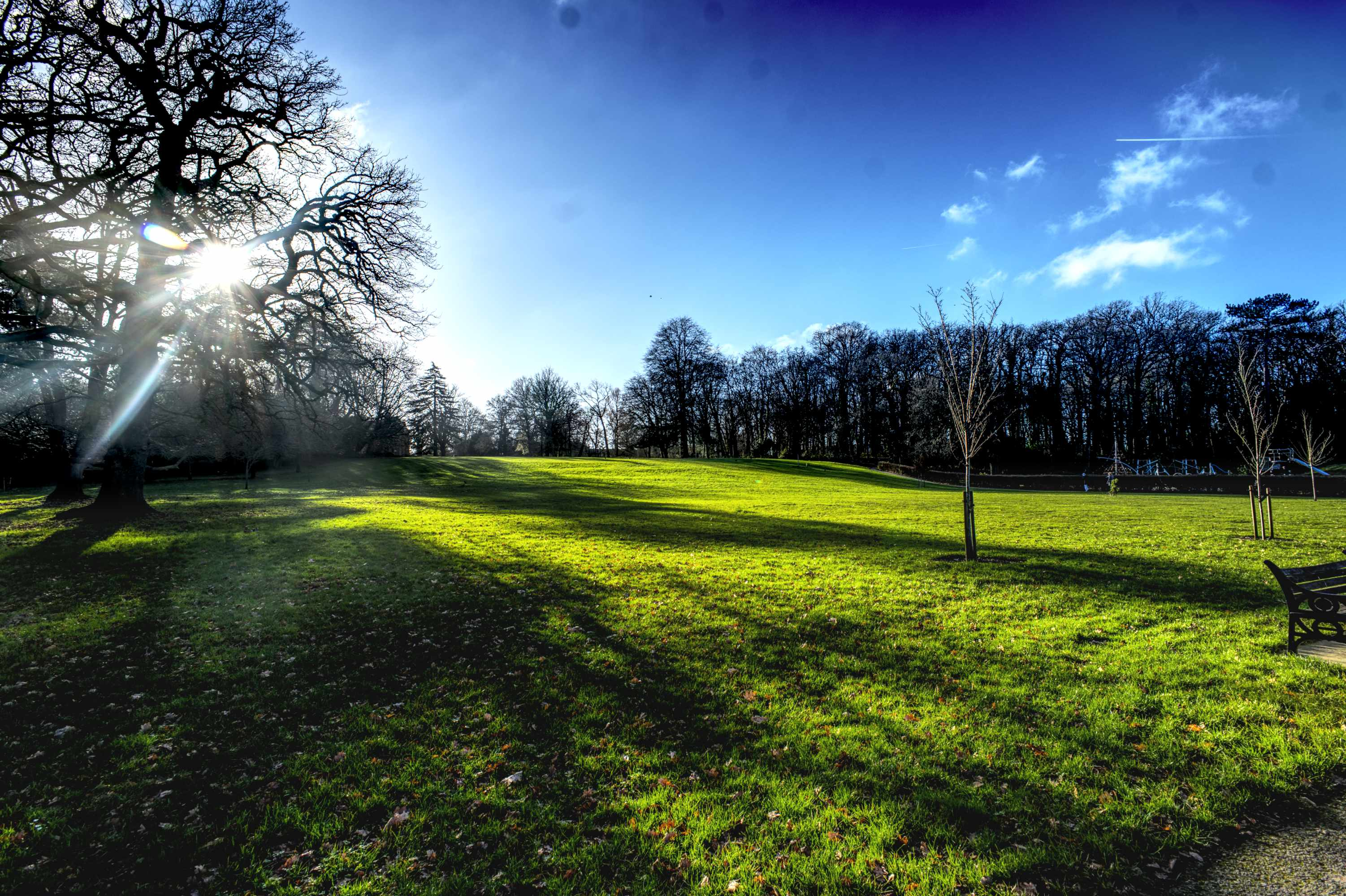
Goffs Park - December 2025

These discoveries confirmed for the first time the existence of Iron Age, pre-Roman ironmaking and industrial development in the area of northern Sussex now occupied by Crawley. Despite this, investigation and analysis were initially discouraged. The Commission for the New Towns, responsible for the town's development at that stage, did not want building work to be delayed, and tried to prevent archaeologists, other professionals, enthusiasts and the general public alike visiting the Hogs Hill Farm site and searching for remains. Workers on the site were expressly forbidden from doing so, although the first discovery had in fact been made by one. By the time the second site was developed in 1970, attitudes had changed, and professional groups were involved from the beginning.

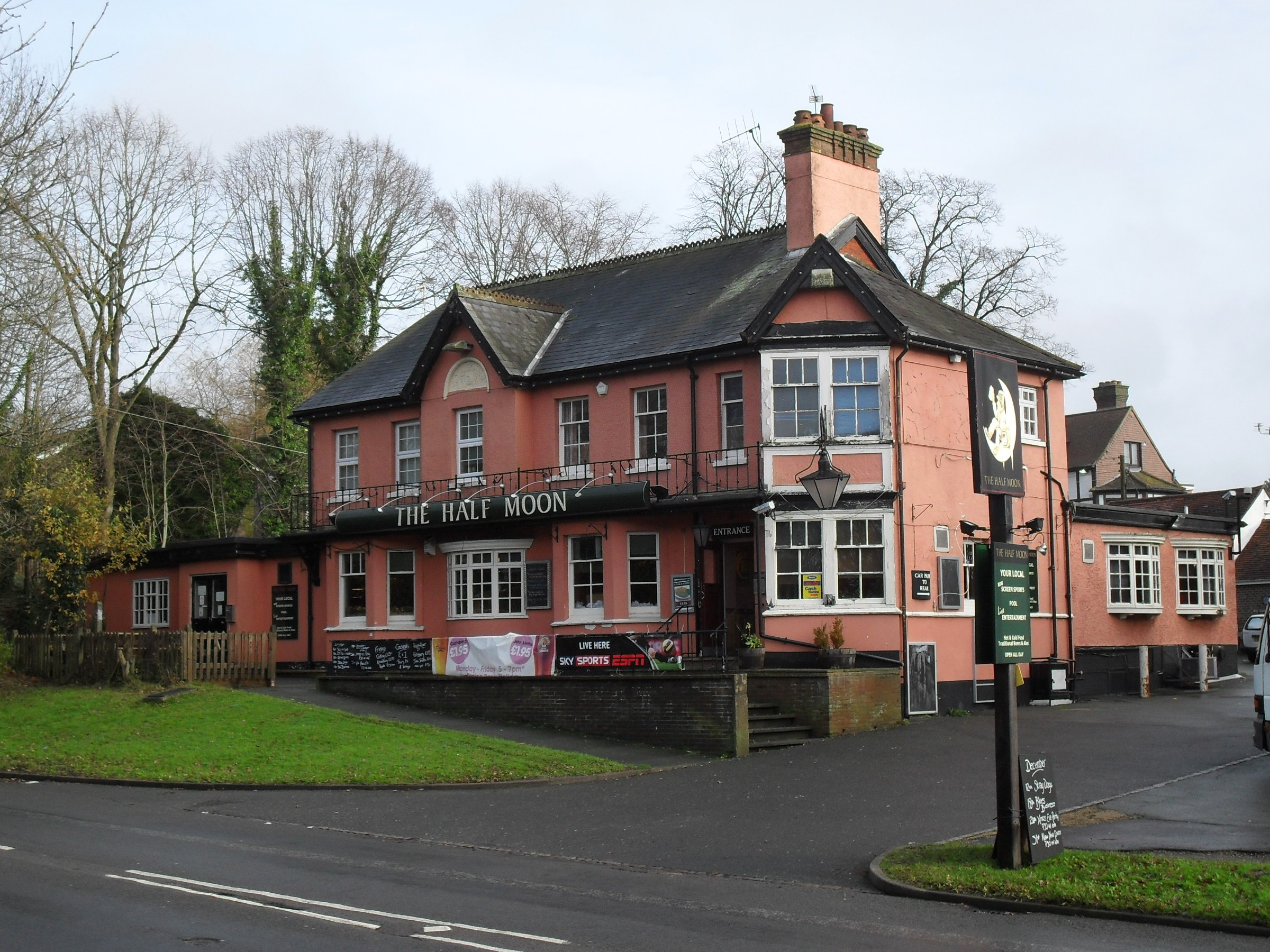
The Half Moon Pub

Crawley began to develop slowly from the 13th century, when it was granted a royal charter for a market. Its ecclesiastical parish, centred on St John the Baptist's Church, was tiny in comparison to neighbouring Worth and Ifield. The parish had an unusual shape: very narrow, long from north to south, and gradually widening to the north until it met the county boundary with Surrey. This directed development northwards along the High Street, part of the ancient London to Brighton road which had provided the impetus for development to begin. The road was partly turnpiked after an Act of Parliament in 1696, and became fully turnpiked in 1770. By this time the distinction between the name "London Road" (the section north of the church) and "Brighton Road" (southwards) had been made; and tollgates were built north and south of the town: these became known as the North Gate and South Gate.

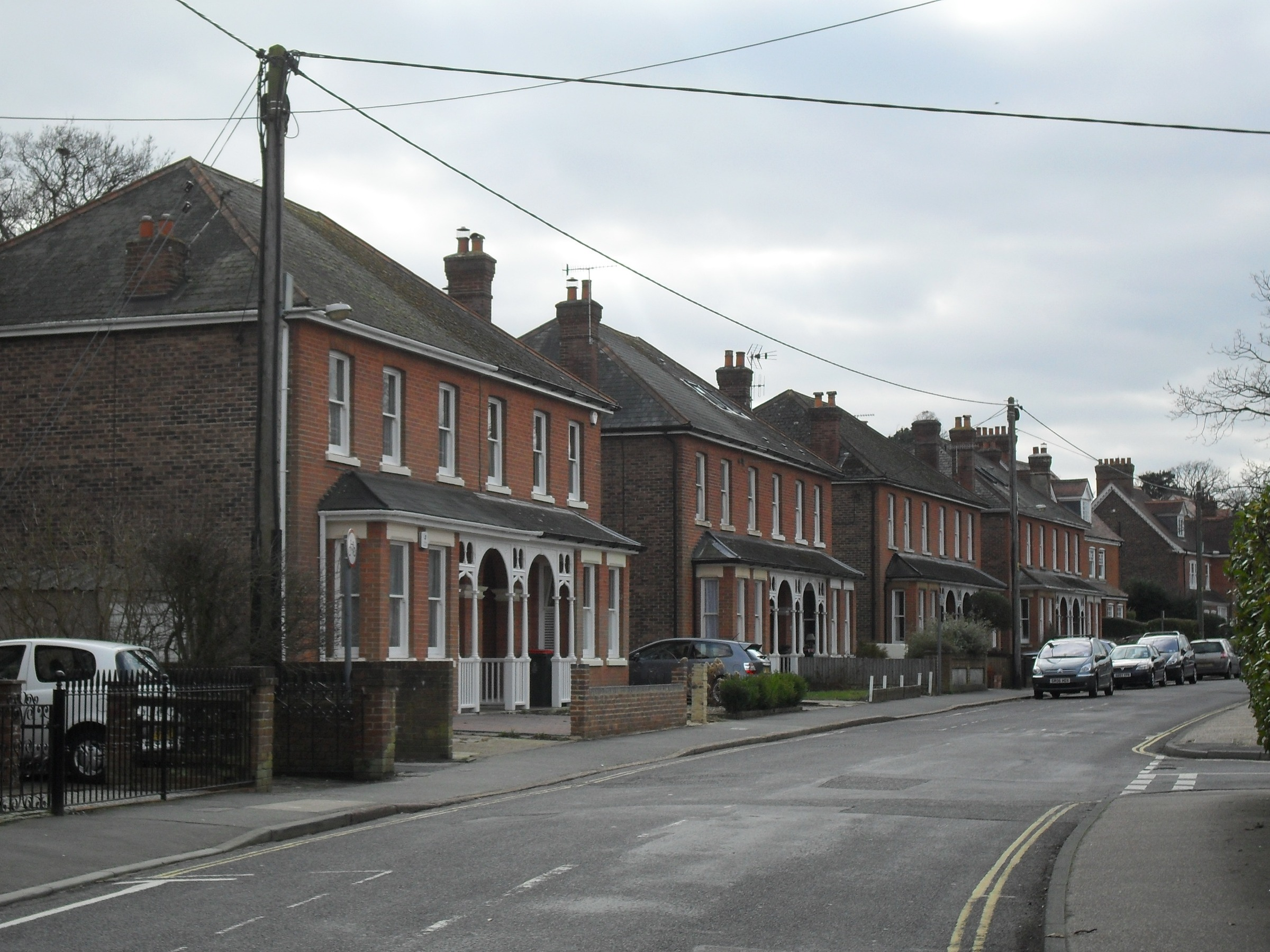
Victorian houses in Malthouse Road

Crawley was connected to the railway network in 1848 when a line was built from Three Bridges to Horsham. It crossed the High Street at a level crossing at the south end of the built-up area. The provision of fast, regular trains to London and other destinations stimulated residential and commercial development, especially around the station. South of the line, around the Brighton Road, there was plenty of land for building; in the second half of the 19th century, two building firms—the most important in Crawley's pre-New Town history—exploited it by building two areas of housing which still exist today, forming the northernmost part of the Southgate neighbourhood. Richard Cook set up a building firm next to the railway line soon after its completion; in the early 1870s he built some streets of mainly terraced houses west of Brighton Road. Confusingly in the context of Crawley's later history, this area was called "New Town", a name which persisted for many years; it had no connection with the later establishment of the New Town of Crawley under the New Towns Act 1946, the name being merely a coincidence. Based around Springfield Road and West Street, at the junction of which was Cook's yard, the "New Town" area had 43 houses in 1875. In the early 1880s, James Longley established his building company nearby, which by 1909 had built an estate of houses east of the Brighton Road. The roads East Park and Malthouse Road had a mixture of terraced cottages, semi-detached houses, detached houses and large villas, all built from red brick. Large houses were also built down both sides of the Brighton Road. Goffs Park Road, between the Brighton and Horsham Roads, began to be built up in 1895, and saw more residential development in the interwar period.

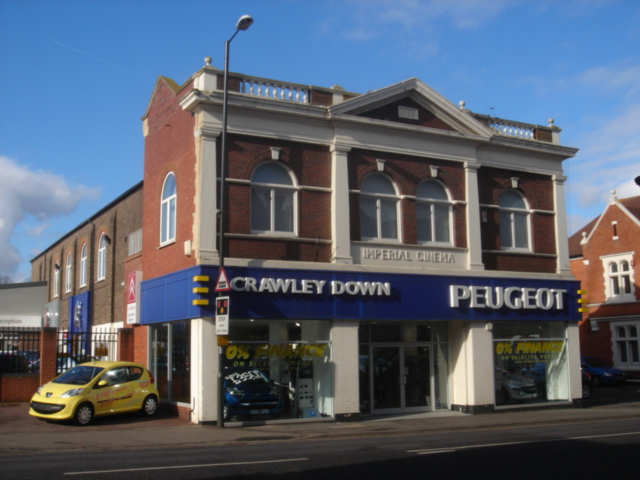
The Imperial Cinema

Apart from these residential buildings, farms and their associated land, there was little else in the area now known as Southgate until Crawley Development Corporation started building the neighbourhood in the 1950s. Some shops, a corn merchant's premises and a brewery were built near the level crossing in the late 19th century. Crawley's first permanent cinema, the Imperial, was established nearby in 1911, replacing a temporary structure; it burnt down in 1928 but was rebuilt, only to be superseded by a larger building in the town centre in the 1930s. It has been a car dealership since the 1940s. Further down the Brighton Road, near the Hogs Hill Farm where Iron Age remains were later found, the Half Moon Inn and Hotel was built in the late 19th century, and rebuilt in 1890. To the west, Goffs Park was established as a parkland and recreational area by the early 20th century. It covers more than 50 acres (20 ha), and its recreational features now include play areas for children, playing fields, sports pitches, lakes, a golf course and a miniature railway.

During World War II, the Crawley area was hit by about 50 high explosive bombs and 2,000 incendiary bombs. The attack which caused the greatest loss of life happened on 10 July 1944, when Southgate's Victorian streets were hit by two V-1 flying bombs. One landed in Malthouse Road and did not detonate, but another destroyed 15 houses, killed seven people and injured 44 more when it exploded at the junction of Oak Road and West Street.

=== New Town era ===
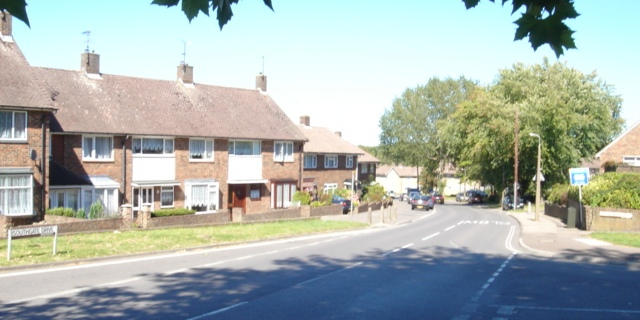
Looking east along Southgate Drive

Crawley was designated as a New Town in January 1947 after the New Towns Act 1946 identified it as a suitable site for one. A Development Corporation was formed, led by the architect Thomas Bennett, and planner Anthony Minoprio provided a master plan for the town's development. He proposed a double ring of nine neighbourhoods surrounding an extended town centre. Southgate was to form the southern part of the inner ring, between the town centre and the southern section of the planned Crawley ring road (which already existed, formed by Crawley and Southgate Avenues). Its built-up area, excluding Goffs Park—which would lie within the neighbourhood's northwest corner—was to be 138 hectares (340 acres).

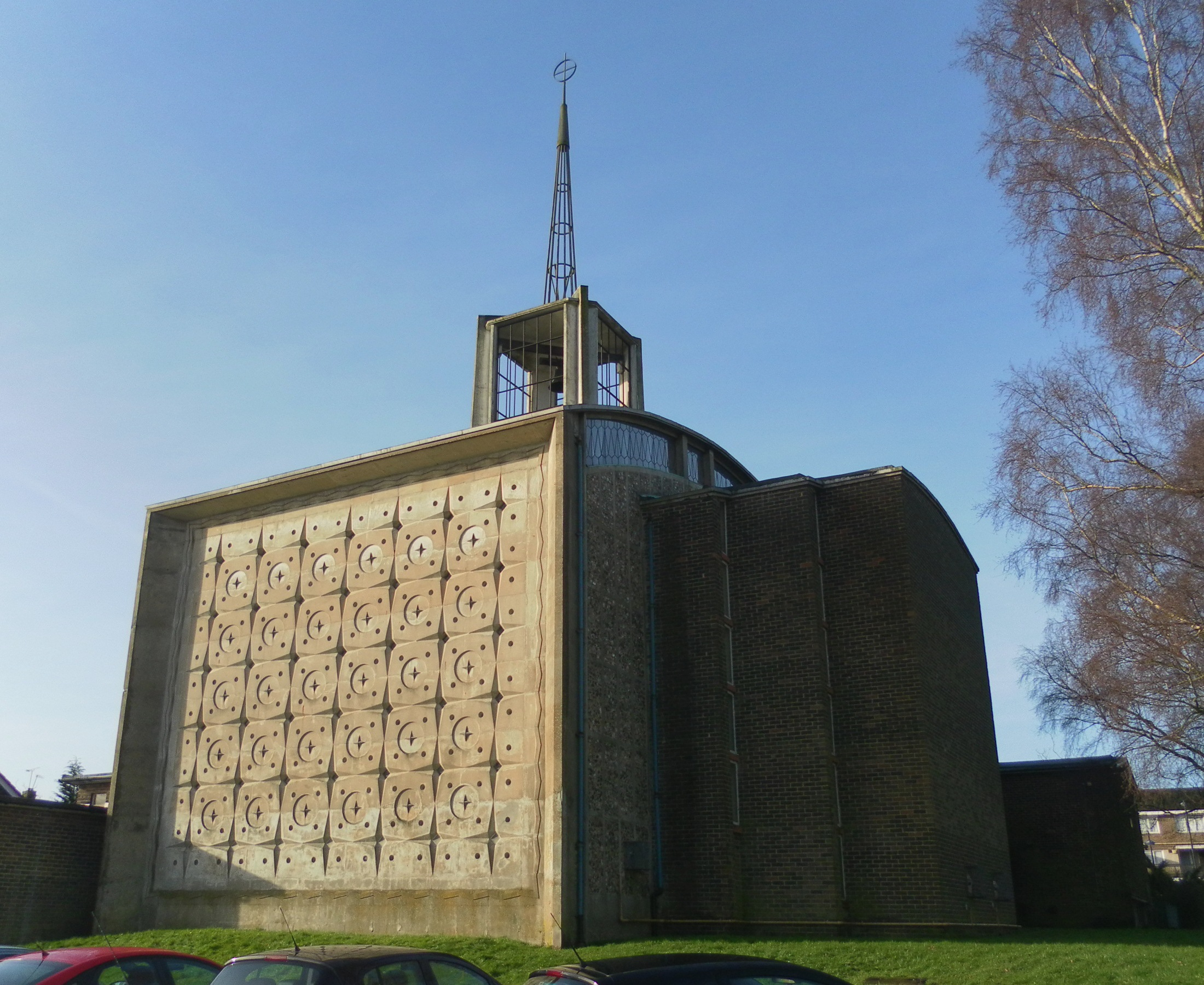
St Mary's Church

The development was intended to take place in two stages: Southgate East, east of the Brighton Road, was to have been built in the early 1950s, and land west of Brighton Road (Southgate West) was to be reserved for expansion of the neighbourhood in the early 1960s. Both stages were delayed: the Development Corporation did not finalise their plan for Southgate East until 1954, several years after building should have started. Work was eventually carried out between 1955 and 1957, making Southgate the seventh neighbourhood to be started.

Southgate West suffered even longer delays, partly because of problems with the planned construction processes. Work should have started in 1961 but had to wait until 1968; plans were not submitted until 1966. The archaeological discoveries in 1969 and 1970 caused further delays, and Southgate West was not complete until 1972.

The master plan proposed that a neighbourhood centre, consisting of community centre, public house, school, church and shopping parade, should be an integral part of each neighbourhood. Initially the Development Corporation provided temporary community centre buildings; West Sussex County Council provided a permanent facility in 1974. A shopping parade was built on Wakehurst Drive in Southgate East in the mid-1950s; the Development Corporation tried to provide some architectural diversity between the neighbourhoods, and as such it was designed as an arcade. St Mary's Church was built opposite the parade in 1958; and infant and junior schools were provided in both halves of the neighbourhood.

In the early 21st century, commercial development spread along Southgate Avenue south of the railway line: a series of seven-storey office blocks were built. The Arora International Hotel Gatwick/Crawley also stands nearby.

== Location within Crawley ==
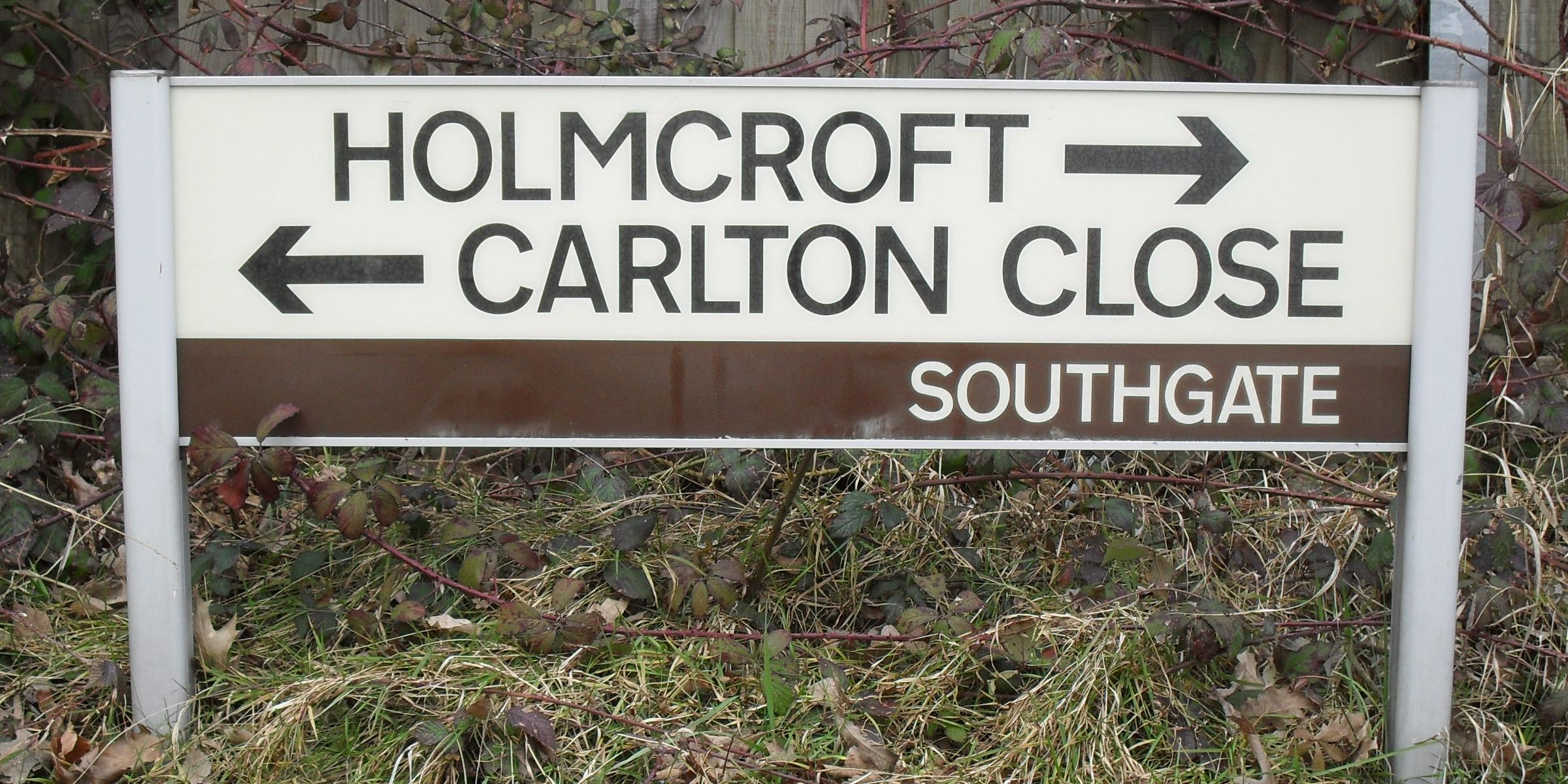
Southgate street sign

Southgate is south of the Northgate neighbourhood (which includes Crawley town centre) and West Green; the Arun Valley railway line forms the boundary. Gossops Green lies to the west, Broadfield is to the southwest, Tilgate is to the south and Furnace Green shares a small border to the east. These are separated from Southgate by the A23 (Crawley Avenue)—part of the Crawley bypass built in the 1930s—and the A2004 Southgate Avenue. The A2219 Brighton Road, part of the original turnpike, coaching route and later main road from London to Brighton, runs through the heart of Southgate from north to south. The neighbourhood is roughly pentagonal and covers 181 hectares (450 acres).

When the New Town was planned, each neighbourhood was allocated a colour, which appears on street name signs together with the neighbourhood's name. Southgate's colour is dark brown.

== Governance ==
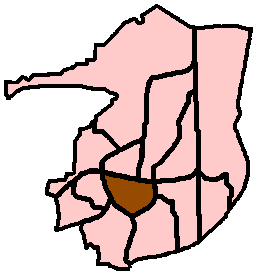
The Crawley Borough area, showing the 13 neighbourhoods; Southgate is shown in brown

When Crawley Urban District was formed in May 1956, it was divided into eight wards whose boundaries were identical with those of eight of the extant and planned neighbourhoods. By 1983, nine years after the district became a borough, the town had thirteen wards. This position remained the same until an electoral review in 2002, which created two new wards. Throughout these changes, Southgate's ward boundaries remained the same, and they are still coterminous with those of the neighbourhood. The ward elects three councillors.

== Demography ==
The neighbourhood is coterminous with the administrative ward of the same name, which is one of the fifteen wards in Crawley. These divisions are used for collecting census and other statistical and demographic data. Southgate's population of 8,106 at the time of the 2001 United Kingdom Census made it Crawley's fifth most populous neighbourhood. Based on its 181-hectare (450-acre) area, its population density was 44.75 inhabitants per hectare (18.11/acre)—more than twice as high as the 22.18 inhabitants per hectare (8.98/acre) density for Crawley overall.

At the census date there were 3,421 households, of which 2,317 (68%) were owned by the occupier, 756 (22%) were rented from Crawley Borough Council or another public-sector landlord, 274 (8%) were rented privately and 74 (2%) were occupied rent-free. These proportions are almost identical to the housing tenure mix of Crawley as a whole. The relatively high population density is partly explained by the relatively high proportion of residents who live in purpose-built flats or maisonettes of various types: 16% compared to the Crawley figure of 11%. Many low-rise blocks of flats were built in Southgate West in the 1970s—in particular the extensive Caburn Heights development of three-storey blocks. The most prevalent housing type in Southgate, in which 52% of residents live, is the terraced house. The proportion is about 2/3 in Southgate West.

According to the census, 90.6% of Southgate residents were White, 6.3% were Asian or Asian-British, 0.8% were Black or Black-British, 1.5% were mixed-race and 0.7% were from another ethnic background. The proportion of white people was slightly higher, and that of Asian people slightly lower, than in Crawley overall; other proportions were comparable to Crawley as a whole. Southgate's age profile at the census date was older than that of Crawley as a whole, in common with the other inner neighbourhoods: 1,609 residents (19.8%) were under 18 years old, 4,853 (59.9%) were between 18 and 64 years old, and 1,644 (20.3%) were 65 years old or older. The corresponding figures for Crawley were 23,748 (23.8%), 61,338 (61.5%) and 14,658 (14.7%).

== Economy ==
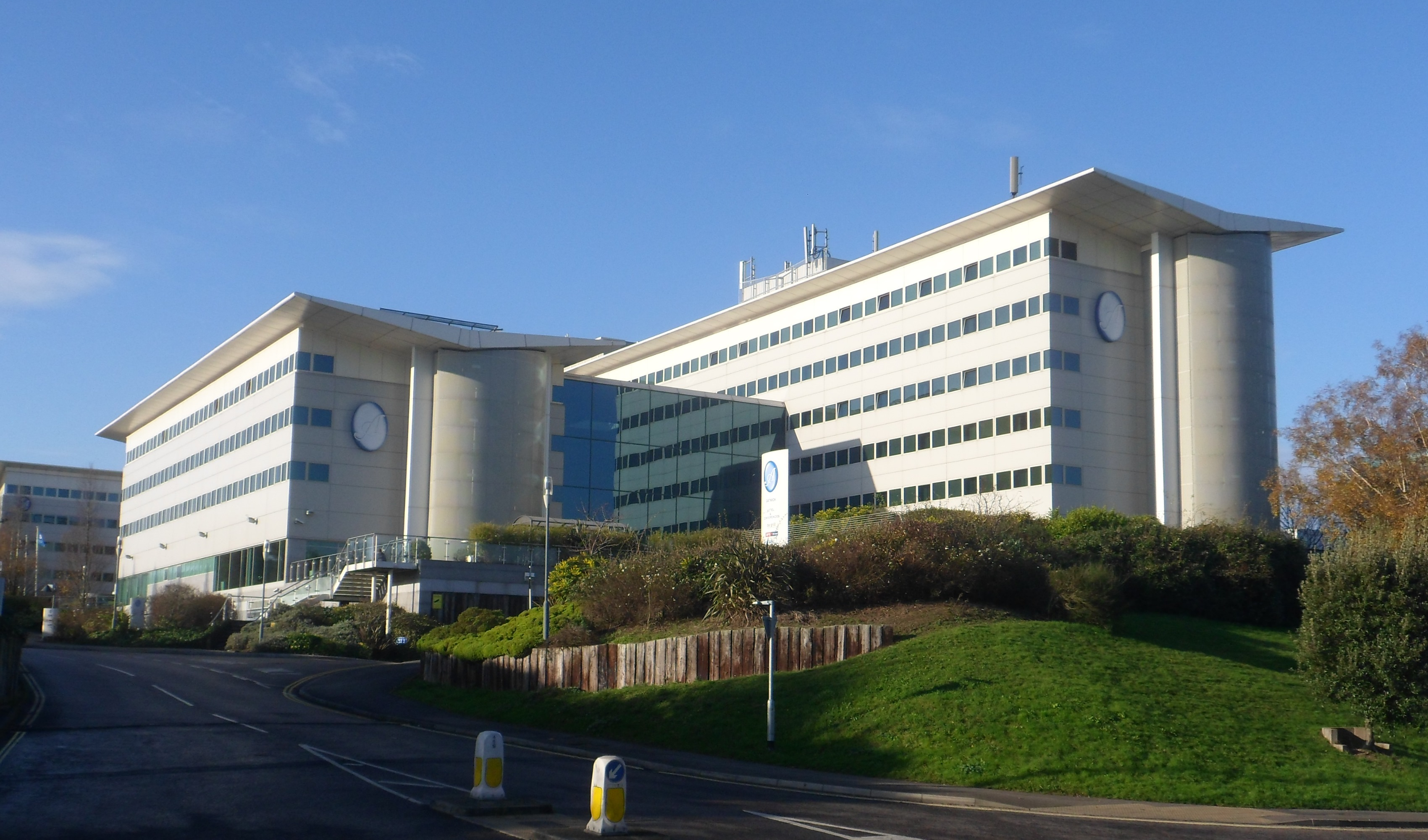
Arora International Hotel

Modern Southgate is primarily residential, and the area was mostly undeveloped before the New Town was created. Nevertheless, some commercial and industrial development existed around the Brighton Road and railway line, and farming provided employment. Two sets of local shops serve the modern neighbourhood, but its proximity to Crawley town centre and main transport routes mean that, as intended in Anthony Minoprio's masterplan, residents travel outside Southgate for most of their employment and shopping requirements.

In common with other areas around Crawley, the land to the south was held by several large farms. Malthouse Farm had its own small-scale brickworks as well; Hilltop Farm was at the highest point in the area, 315 feet (96 m) above sea level; and Hogs Hill Farm, named after the herds of pigs farmed there, stood on a ridge east of the Brighton Road.

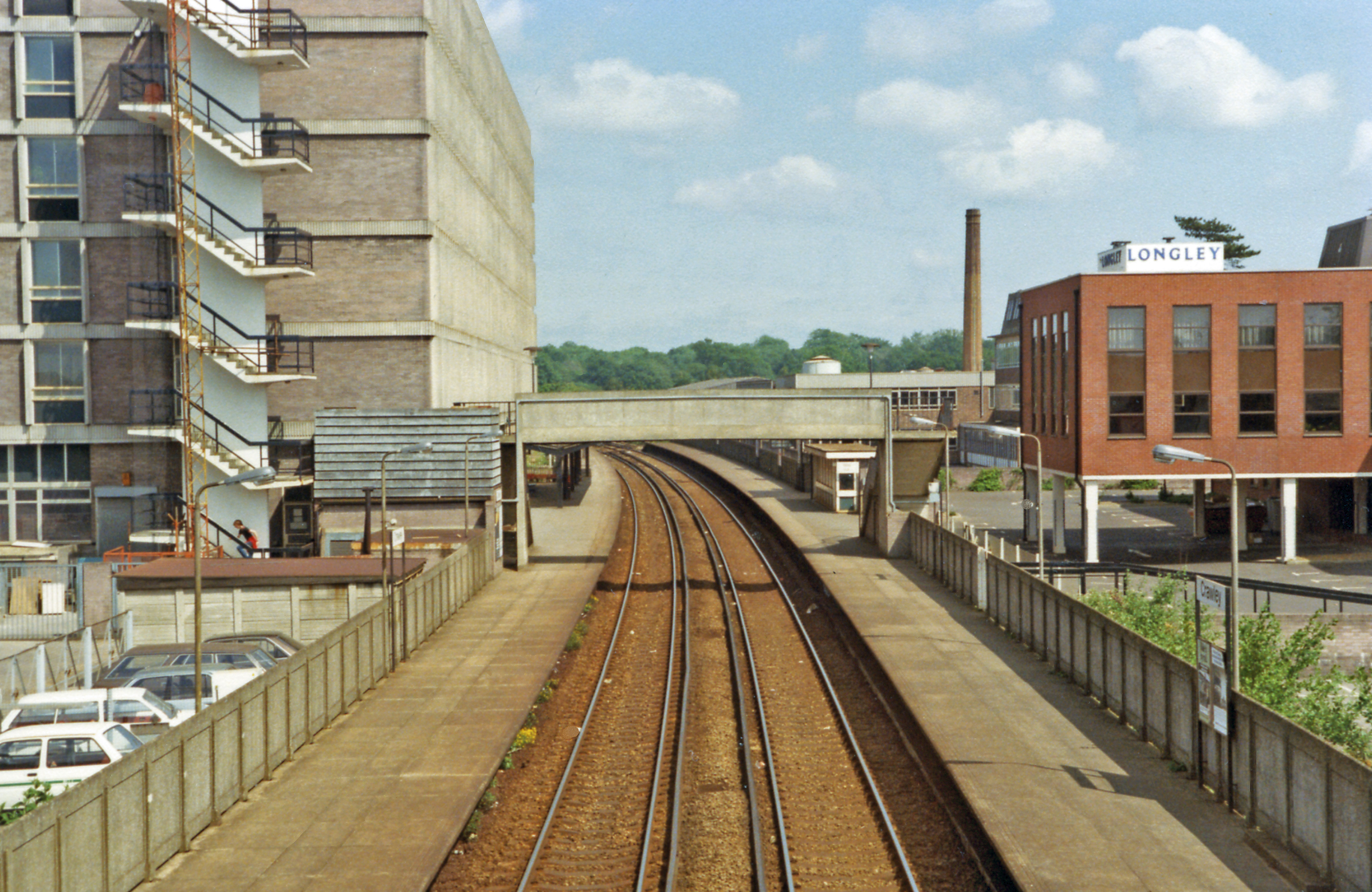
The hotel occupies the site of Longley and Company's factory and yard, seen here in 1983.

Crawley's two main building firms had their yards and works in the Victorian streets near the railway line. Richard Cook's firm, which built the houses and streets of the 19th-century "New Town" development, was founded in 1861 and was based at the corner of two of the new streets. The works included a brickyard; poor drainage led to soil and dirty water from it polluting the surrounding area. The Crawley and Ifield Vigilance Committee, an amateur pressure group, demanded improvements for several years, and proper drains were eventually laid. Cook and Sons' advertisements revealed the range of products manufactured: the works made bricks, tiles, pipes and pottery, and his team of labourers carried out all types of building and contracting work. James Longley and Sons became the most famous business in Crawley and one of its largest: in 1898 more than 700 people worked for it. Longley moved his small firm from Turners Hill in 1881 when he bought Malthouse Farm and its brickworks. Expansion was rapid, and they received commissions for Christ's Hospital school near Horsham, the King Edward VII Sanatorium in Midhurst, Graylingwell Hospital in Chichester, the choir stalls in Westminster Abbey and almost every railway station owned by the London, Brighton and South Coast Railway. Longley and Sons, which soon became Longley and Company, quickly became one of southeast England's main building firms; but it was nearly ruined on 20 March 1924 when the joinery and timber works, all stock inside it and sixty machines were destroyed by fire. The firm recovered, though, and was able to tender for a wide range of contracts in the New Town era, including Hazelwick School, much of the Manor Royal industrial estate, Crawley fire station, the Queen's Square shopping area and Crawley College's tower block extension.

Neither building firm survives. Cook's lasted into the New Town era but wound down after that; their work survives in the streets of Southgate and at St Peter's Church in West Green, a school in Handcross, the churchyard of St Margaret's Church, Ifield and elsewhere. Longley and Company ceased trading in 2000, and the works and associated buildings were demolished soon afterwards to make way for housing and a hotel. The Arora International Hotel Gatwick/Crawley, which has conference facilities, a large health and fitness suite and restaurant, was built on the site at the end of East Park in 2001. The 4-star hotel has 432 bedrooms.

== Public buildings and facilities ==
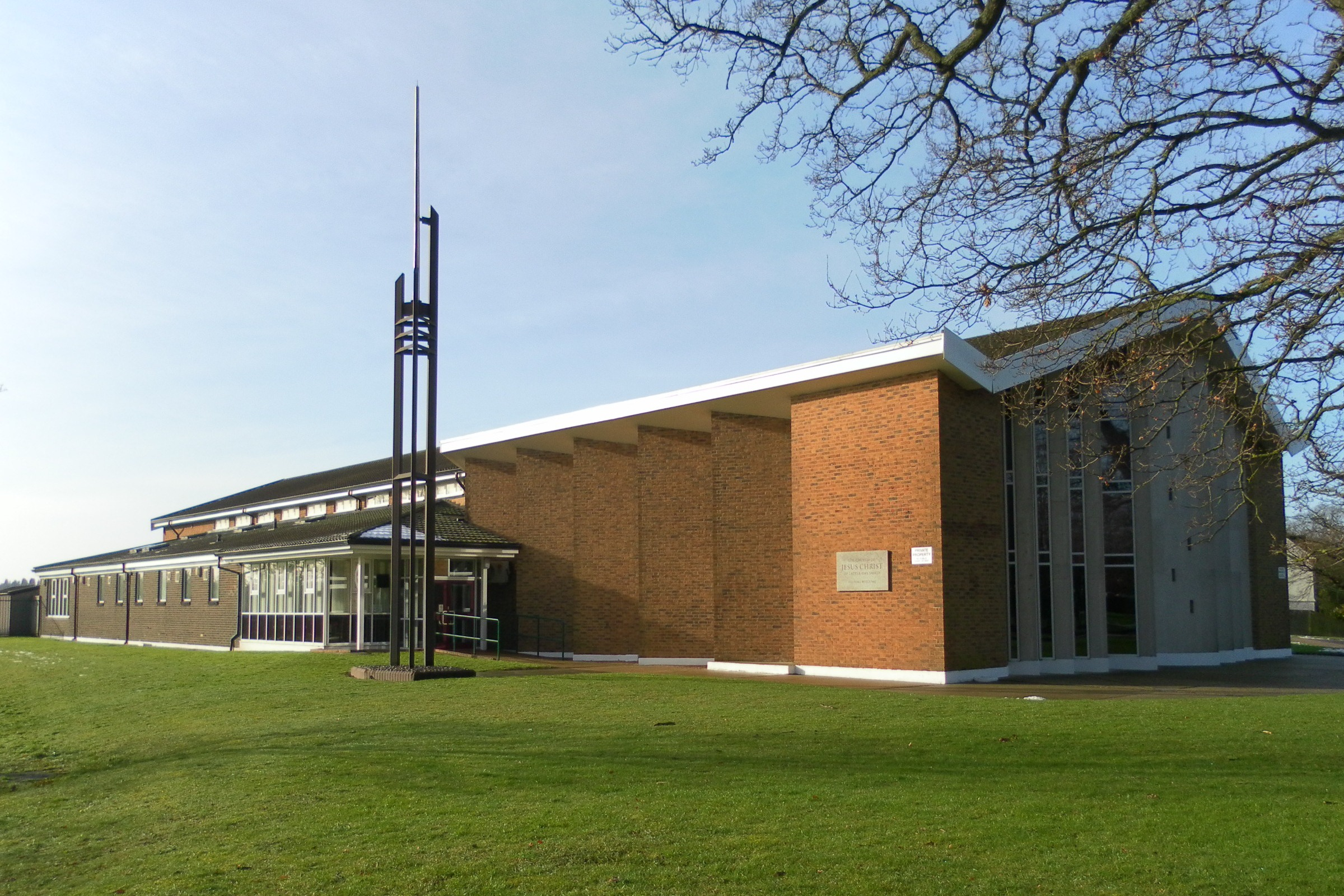
Meetinghouse of The Church of Jesus Christ of Latter-day Saints

St Mary's Church is the Anglican parish church of Southgate. The churches in the Broadfield, Furnace Green and Tilgate neighbourhoods are linked to it as daughter churches. Architects Henry Braddock and D.F. Martin-Smith designed it in 1958. The concrete and glass structure has a small flèche on top of a bell tower, and has an adjoining hall which can be opened out to increase the capacity of the church. It is on Wakehurst Drive opposite the main shopping parade. The Church of Jesus Christ of Latter-day Saints has a meetinghouse on Horsham Road; it was designed by the chief architect of the town, Sir Thomas Bennett, and built in 1964 on land provided by Crawley Development Corporation. ChristChurch (formerly Gateway Church International) on Brewer Road is a non-denominational church associated with the New Covenant Ministries International movement; its barnlike building has a semicircular roof.

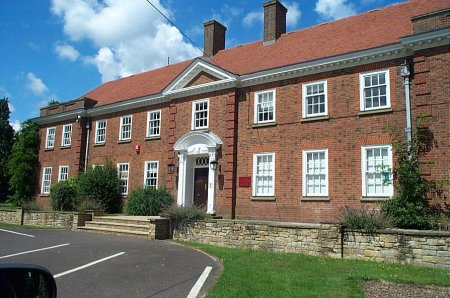
St Wilfrid's Catholic School

St Wilfrid's Catholic School is a 900-pupil voluntary aided secondary school, which opened in 1952 in the former Oakwood House next to Goffs Park. It was extended several times and became a comprehensive in 1967. Former pupils include Robert Smith of rock band The Cure. A Roman Catholic primary school, St Francis of Assisi School, is located on Southgate Drive. Southgate Primary School was formed in 2004 from a merger between a first school and a middle school on the same site. The school is now a 400 pupil fast-growing school. These had in turn been formed from the original Southgate County Infant and Junior School, opened in 1956. Residential development in Southgate West resulted in the opening of first and middle schools there, in 1969 and 1970 respectively; these closed in 2004 and were replaced by Hilltop Primary School.

The Development Corporation set up a sub-committee in 1953 to decide how public houses should be provided in the New Town neighbourhoods. The Downsman pub was built shortly afterwards next to the shopping parade. Elsewhere, Goffs Manor pub and restaurant is near Goffs Park.

St. Catherine's Hospice, a charity which provides hospice care to patients throughout West Sussex and Surrey, is based on Malthouse Road in the 19th-century part of Southgate. Crawley's new skatepark was built on playing fields at Southgate Avenue in 2007.

== Heritage ==
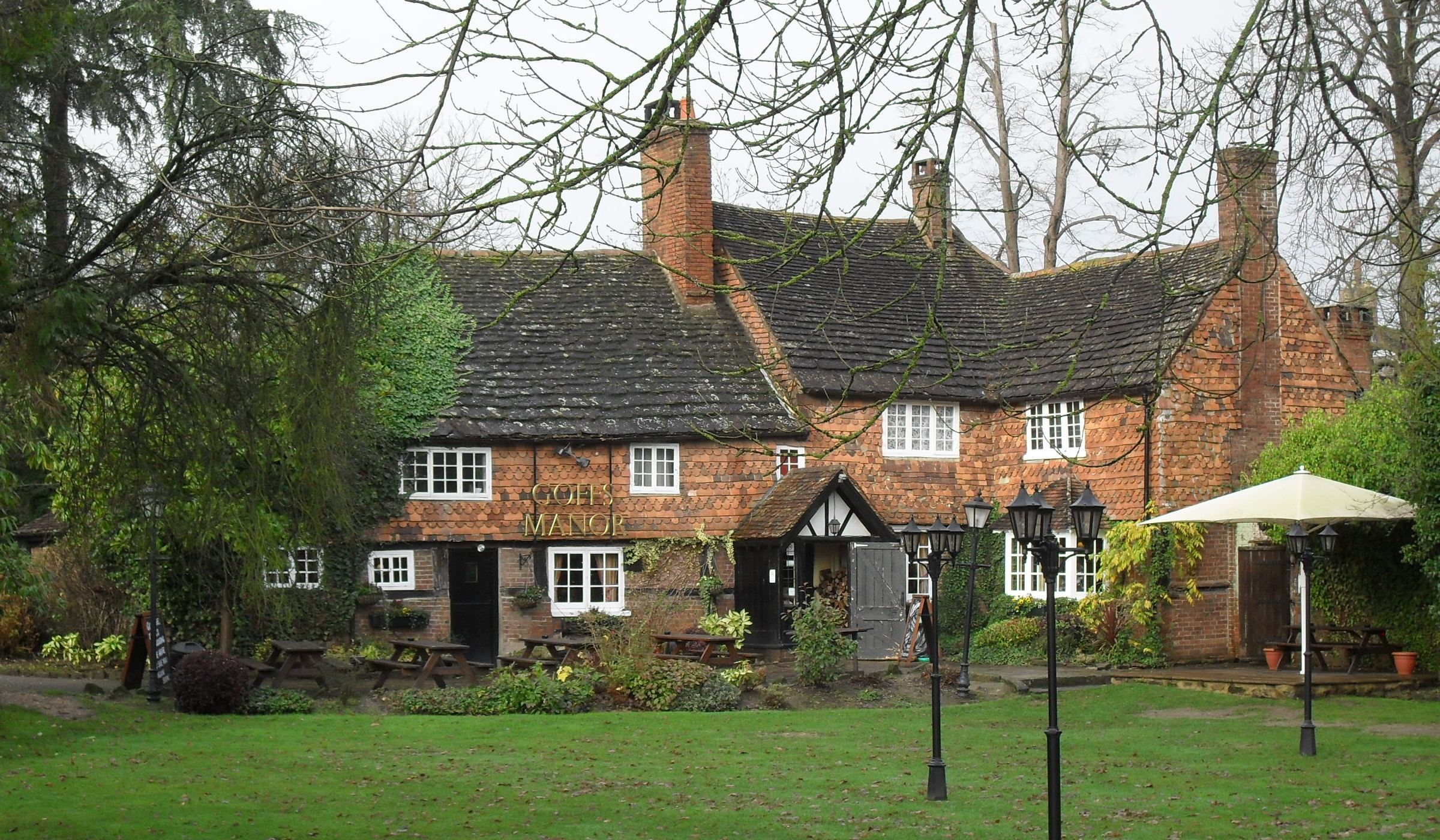
Goffs Manor—a Grade II listed building

Two of the 100 listed buildings and structures in the Borough of Crawley are in Southgate. Goffs Manor, in Goffs Park, is a Grade II-listed 16th-century farmhouse which is now a restaurant and pub. Before its conversion, actor Peter Vaughan owned and lived in it. The building is timber-framed, as many Crawley houses of the time were, although little of this is now visible. The upper floor is hung with red tiles. The roof is made of slabs of Horsham Stone. An original open fireplace remains inside. The signal box next to the level crossing on Crawley High Street, another Grade II-listed building, is just on the Southgate side of the railway line. It was built in about 1860 and has a hipped roof.

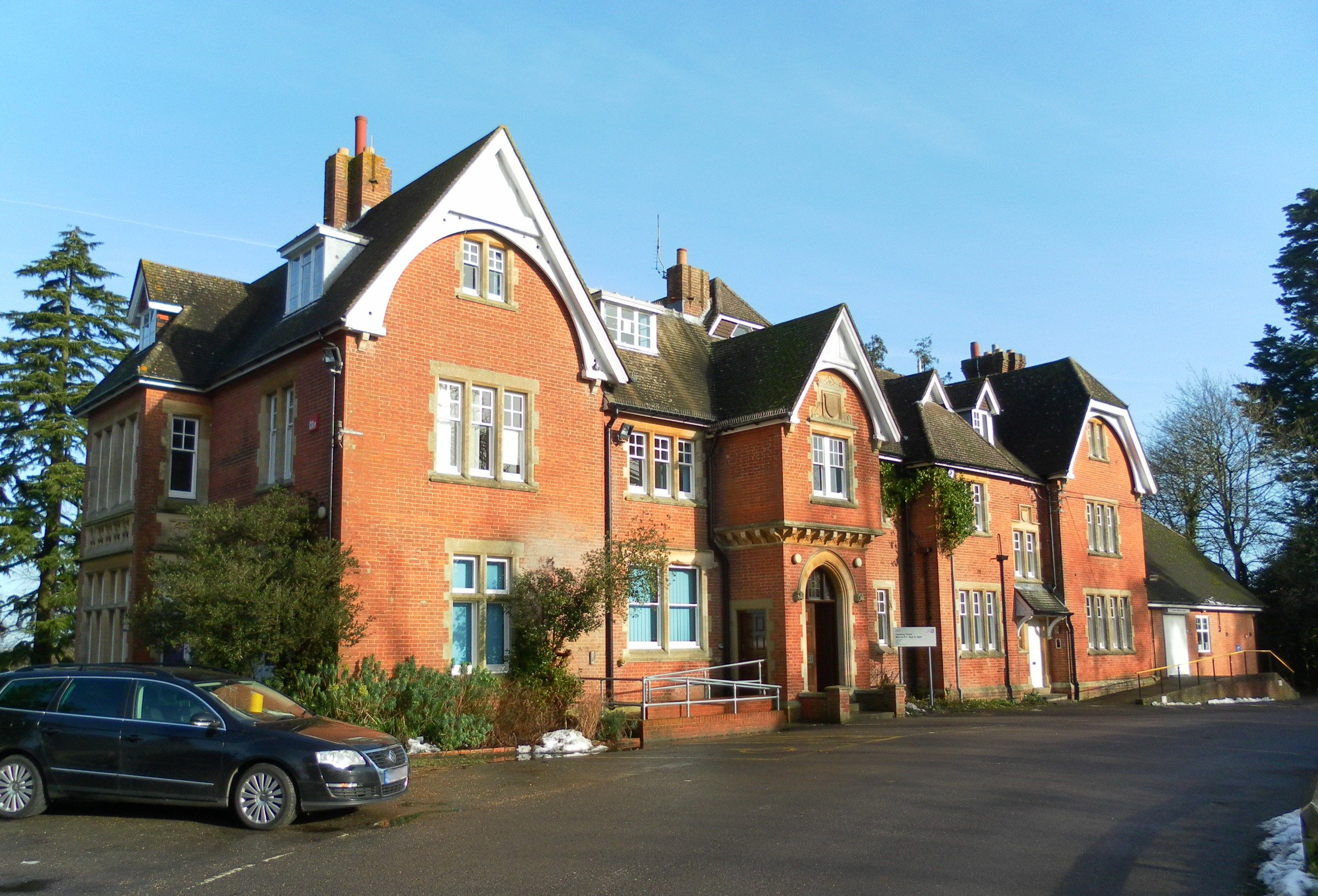
Goffs Park House—a locally listed building

Crawley Borough Council has designated a conservation area around the level crossing on Brighton Road. Part of this falls within Southgate's boundaries. Elsewhere, Goffs Park Road has been given the status of an Area of Special Environmental Quality. Goffs Park itself was given a Green Flag Award in July 2008 in recognition of its high standards.

There were 59 locally listed buildings in Crawley as of 2010; seven are in Southgate. Crawley Museum is based in Goffs Park House in Goffs Park, although in March 2010 plans were announced to move it elsewhere in the town—possibly to Tree House, a vacant council-owned listed building in the town centre. Goffs Park House was designed in 1882 by architect William Buck and built by a Horsham-based firm on behalf of banker Edwin Henty. The red-brick, Bath stone and sandstone building combines the Queen Anne Revival and Vernacular styles. Its large grounds have become Goffs Park. Nightingale House on the Brighton Road dates from 1901 and was originally a bank branch. Its "striking corner turret", oriel windows and detailed treatment of the ground-floor elevation make it a local landmark. The four villas at 108–122 Malthouse Road, forming eight semi-detached houses, are of a similar date and retain most of their original features such as carved timber porches and stained glass panelling. The local building firm James Longley & Company built them. Goffs Park Road was developed with large houses in the early 20th century, and Park Lodge and Masons Hall (now offices) are two examples. Park Lodge has been considerably altered but retains the character of a "late Victorian red-brick villa"; Masons Hall is later (1905) and "rather eccentric", resembling a Tuscan villa and featuring a campanile-style projection at one corner. Nearby, 49 Brighton Road, a large detached villa, is an example of Richard Cook's late-19th-century housing in the "New Town" area of Southgate. It has red-brick walls with ornate mouldings, timber-framed gables and original sash windows. St Mary's Church is also on the local list.

== Transport ==
Metrobus, which operates most local bus services in Crawley, serves several stops in Southgate. The nearest railway station is Crawley, which has a rear entrance on East Park Road in the north of the neighbourhood.

Levels of vehicle ownership, as measured by the 2001 census, are lower than in Crawley as a whole. At the census date, the mean number of vehicles per household was 1.09 (the overall Crawley figure was 1.21), and 25.4% of households had no transport of their own, compared to 20.4% in Crawley overall.
