= RH postcode area =

Postcode area within the United Kingdom

Redhill
- Postcode area
- Coordinates: 51.109°N 0.210°W
- Country: United Kingdom
- Postcode area: RH
- Postcode area name: Redhill
- Post towns: 17
- Postcode districts: 21
- Postcode sectors: 89
- Postcodes (live): 16,011
- Postcodes (total): 24,131
- Statistics as at May 2020

The RH postcode area, also known as the Redhill postcode area, is a group of twenty postcode districts in South East England, within seventeen post towns. These cover east Surrey (including Redhill, Reigate, Betchworth, Dorking, Lingfield, Horley, Oxted and Godstone) and northeastern West Sussex (including Crawley, Gatwick, Haywards Heath, Billingshurst, East Grinstead, Burgess Hill, Horsham and Pulborough) plus small parts of northwestern East Sussex (including Forest Row).

The main sorting office is in Crawley (Gatwick Mail Centre), and the area served includes parts of the Surrey districts of Mole Valley, Reigate and Banstead and Tandridge, and a small part of the borough of Guildford, as well as most of the West Sussex districts of Crawley, Horsham, and Mid Sussex, and a small part of Chichester district, and small parts of the East Sussex districts of Lewes and Wealden.

== Coverage ==
The approximate coverage of the postcode districts:

Postcode district	Post town	Coverage	Local authority area(s)
RH1	REDHILL	Redhill, Merstham, Earlswood, South Earlswood, Whitebushes, Salfords, Nutfield, Nutfield Marsh, South Nutfield, Bletchingley, Outwood	Reigate and Banstead, Tandridge
RH2	REIGATE	Reigate, Woodhatch, South Park, Skimmington, Leigh, Dawes Green, Bunce Common, Shellwood Cross, Nalderswood, Sidlow, Irons Bottom	Mole Valley, Reigate and Banstead
RH3	BETCHWORTH	Betchworth, Brockham, Buckland, Strood Green, Gadbrook	Mole Valley
RH4	DORKING	Dorking, Pixham, Westcott	Mole Valley
RH5	DORKING	Abinger, Capel, Westhumble, Mickleham, Ockley, Holmbury St Mary, Beare Green	Guildford, Mole Valley
RH6	GATWICK	Gatwick Airport	Crawley
RH6	HORLEY	Horley, Charlwood, Burstow, Smallfield	Crawley, Mole Valley, Reigate and Banstead, Tandridge
RH7	LINGFIELD	Lingfield, Dormansland, Crowhurst	Tandridge
RH8	OXTED	Oxted, Limpsfield, Limpsfield Chart, Hurst Green, Merle Common, Tandridge, Crowhurst Lane End	Tandridge
RH9	GODSTONE	Godstone, South Godstone	Tandridge
RH10	CRAWLEY	Copthorne, Crawley Down, Domewood, Furnace Green, Maidenbower, Northgate, Pound Hill, Rowfant, Southgate, Three Bridges, Tilgate	Crawley, Mid Sussex
RH11	CRAWLEY	Bewbush, Broadfield, Gossops Green, Ifield, Langley Green, Lowfield Heath, Pease Pottage, Southgate West, West Green	Crawley, Horsham, Mid Sussex
RH12	HORSHAM	Horsham, Broadbridge Heath, Faygate, Kilnwood Vale, Rusper, Rudgwick, Warnham	Horsham
RH13	HORSHAM	Barns Green, Cowfold, Mannings Heath, Partridge Green, Slinfold, Southwater, West Grinstead, Coolham	Horsham
RH14	BILLINGSHURST	Billingshurst, Ifold, Kirdford, Loxwood, Plaistow, Wisborough Green	Chichester, Horsham
RH15	BURGESS HILL	Burgess Hill, Ditchling Common	Lewes, Mid Sussex
RH16	HAYWARDS HEATH	Haywards Heath, Lindfield	Mid Sussex
RH17	HAYWARDS HEATH	Ansty, Ardingly, Balcombe, Bolney, Chelwood Gate, Cuckfield, Danehill, Handcross, Hickstead, Horsted Keynes, Wivelsfield, Wivelsfield Green	Lewes, Mid Sussex, Wealden
RH18	FOREST ROW	Forest Row	Wealden
RH19	EAST GRINSTEAD	East Grinstead, Ashurst Wood, Dormans Park, Felbridge, Felcourt, Hammerwood, Sharpthorne, West Hoathly	Mid Sussex, Tandridge
RH20	PULBOROUGH	Pulborough, Ashington, Washington, Storrington, West Chiltington, West Chiltington Common, Bury, Watersfield, Sutton, Fittleworth	Chichester, Horsham
RH77	REDHILL	Jobcentre Plus	non-geographic

== Map ==
RH postcode area map, showing postcode districts in red and post towns in grey text, with links to nearby BN, CR, GU, KT and TN postcode areas.

== See also ==
- Postcode Address File
- List of postcode areas in the United Kingdom
