= Broadfield, West Sussex =

Area of Crawley, West Sussex, England

Coordinates: 51.0959°N 0.2068°W

Broadfield
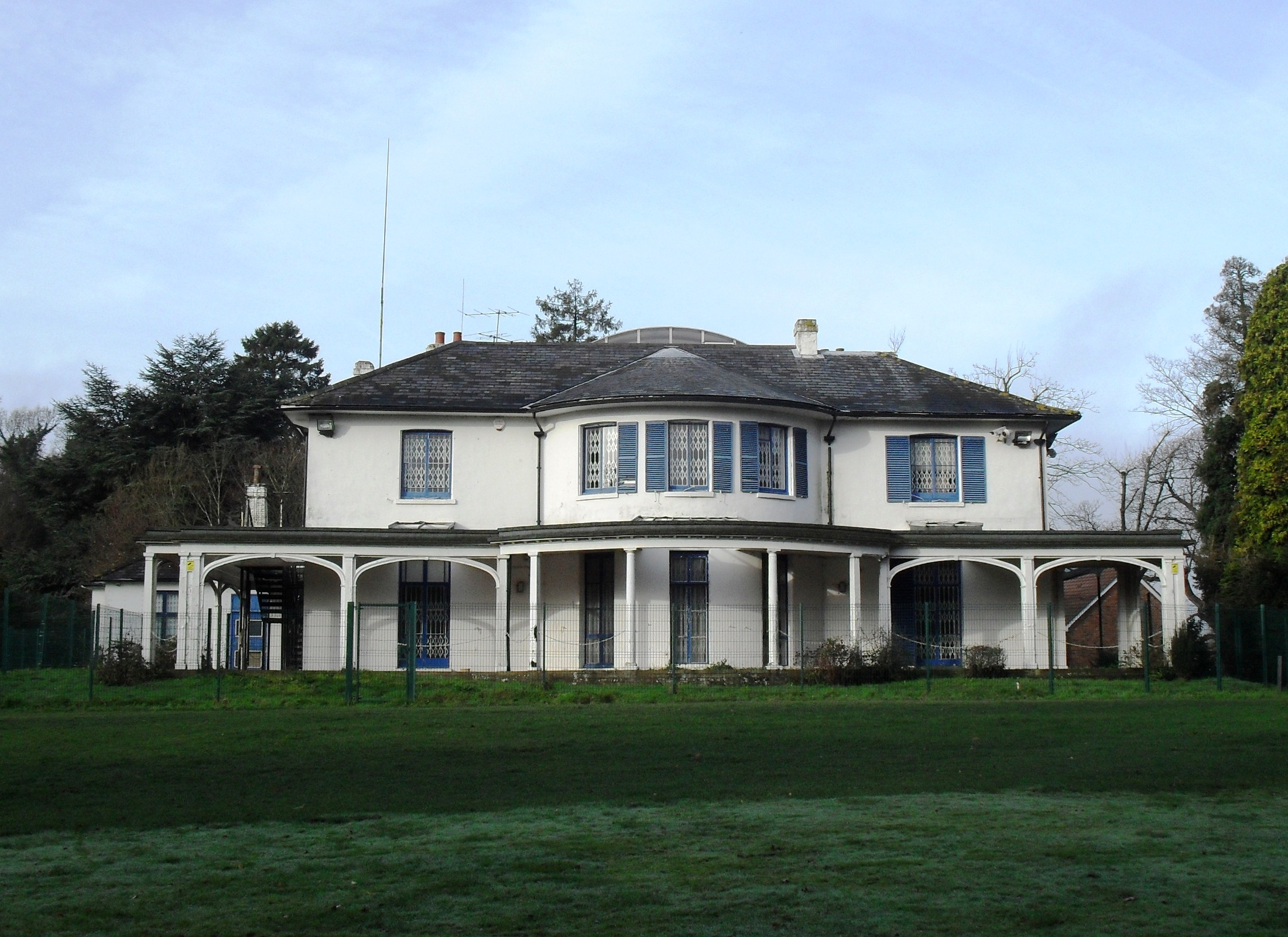
- Broadfield House

- Location within West Sussex
- OS grid reference: TQ255345
- District: Crawley
- Shire county: West Sussex
- Region: South East
- Country: England
- Sovereign state: United Kingdom
- Post town: CRAWLEY
- Postcode district: RH11
- Dialling code: 01293
- Police: Sussex
- Fire: West Sussex
- Ambulance: South East Coast
- UK Parliament: Crawley

Broadfield is one of 14 neighbourhoods within the town of Crawley in West Sussex, England. Broadfield is located in the south west of the town. It is bordered by Bewbush to the north, Southgate to the north east and Tilgate to the east.

== Layout ==
Broadfield is split across three local government wards, Broadfield, Bewbush & North Broadfield and Gossops Green & North East Broadfield.

Broadfield was built in several stages and is relatively densely populated. There is a mixture of property types, including private estates, housing association, council houses and self-build.

Broadfield has one central shopping parade, the Barton, which is one of the largest neighbourhood parade in the town. Unlike many of the parades in the town, which are council run, the Barton is owned and managed by the shop-owners. There is a wide variety of shops, a library, a church (shared by Anglicans, Catholics and Broadfield Christian Fellowship), a nearby mosque and a large medical centre. There is also a community centre which is run as a charitable organisation overseen by trustees from the churches.

== Schools ==
There are two infant/primary schools in the neighbourhood, an adventure playground, several open spaces with football pitches, and Broadfield Stadium, home to Crawley Town Football Club and Brighton & Hove Albion W.F.C. In 2005 a purpose-built Sure Start Children's Centre was opened on Creasys Drive providing support and facilities for families of under 5's. The Broadfield centre works closely with a similar establishment in Bewbush.

== Parks ==
Next to the stadium is Broadfield Park, which used to be part of the Tilgate Estate. Broadfield House was the hunting lodge for the estate, and the park contains a small lake and some woods.

To the south of Broadfield are the Buchan Country Park and part of the High Weald Area of Outstanding Natural Beauty at Pease Pottage. The latter is currently home to a Scout camp.

== Public transportation ==
Broadfield is served by various bus services including the 24-hour Fastway bus service to Gatwick Airport.
