= Manor Green School =

Coordinates: 51°30′24″N 0°45′30″W

Location
- Elizabeth Hawkes Way; Maidenhead, Berkshire, SL6 3EQ; England

Information
- Type: Community special school
- Local authority: Windsor and Maidenhead
- Department for Education URN: 110183 Tables
- Ofsted: Reports
- Headteacher: Helen Hannam
- Gender: Coeducational
- Age: 2 to 19
- Enrolment: 291 as of April 2023
- Website: http://www.manorgreenschool.co.uk/

Manor Green School is a day special school located in Maidenhead, Berkshire, England. It caters for over 200 students, aged 2–19, with a wide range of special educational needs (SEN).

== History ==
The school was previously known as Holyport Manor School, but was relaunched as Manor Green School in September 2010, moving to a new purpose-built campus.
