= Tilgate =

Area of Crawley, West Sussex, England

Coordinates: 51.1045°N 0.1779°W

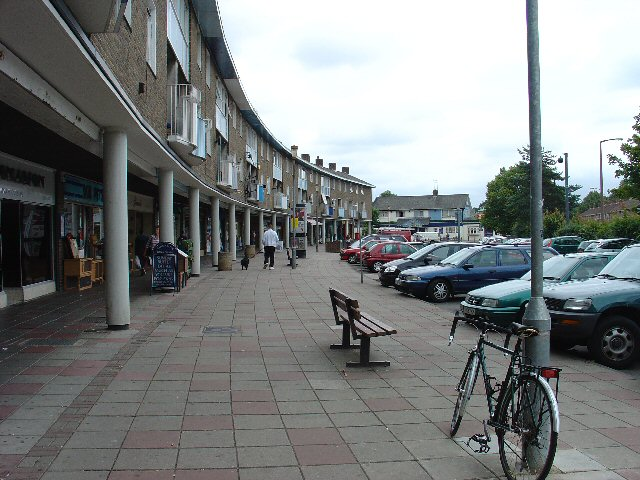

- Location within West Sussex
- OS grid reference: TQ275355
- District: Crawley
- Shire county: West Sussex
- Region: South East
- Country: England
- Sovereign state: United Kingdom
- Post town: Crawley
- Postcode district: RH10
- Dialling code: 01293
- Police: Sussex
- Fire: West Sussex
- Ambulance: South East Coast
- UK Parliament: Crawley

Tilgate is one of 14 neighbourhoods within the town of Crawley in West Sussex, England. The area contains a mixture of privately developed housing, self-build groups and ex-council housing. It is bordered by the districts of Furnace Green to the north east, Southgate to the north west and Broadfield to the south west.

== History ==
Tilgate was first mentioned in 13th- and 14th-century tax returns with the inclusion of land owned by William Yllegate (or de illegate).

Within the Tilgate forest in the 17th century was a furnace (Tilgate Furnace).

In the 1860s a large house (Tilgate Mansion) and estate was created of 2,185 acres (which included 800 acres (3.2 km^{2}) of woodland). The entrance and Tilgate Forest Lodge is near Three Bridges railway station. The supply ponds for the furnace survived and became Tilgate Lake within the estate.

The estate was associated with the Joliffe family (and later the Nix family of bankers).

The estate was sold by auction on 7 September 1939; this included the park and mansion and properties in Three Bridges. The mansion was converted into flats, used by the Canadian Army during the Second World War but later demolished. The lodge house is now a bank in Three Bridges. The estate became Tilgate Park.

== Tilgate: Crawley New Town ==
With the creation of Crawley New Town in 1947 the Tilgate area was proposed as a neighbourhood. Construction began in 1955. A reserved area for housing Tilgate East was developed as Furnace Green. Tilgate had a population of 7,130 in 1981.

== Tilgate: Crawley ==
Tilgate is the home of Tilgate Park, a large area of forest run by the Forestry Commission. The forest contains Tilgate Nature Reserve and Wild Breeds Centre, three recreational lakes (Campbells Lake, Silt Lake and Titmus Lake), park areas, Tilgate Golf Course, and several small commercial buildings known as 'huts' which are used by small sports and hobby clubs and businesses.

The Thomas Bennett School (opened in 1958) was one of the earliest Comprehensive Schools in England, and by 1967 was the largest secondary school in England. It was named after Sir Thomas Bennett, chairman of Crawley Development Corporation. There are also two Primary schools within the area, as well as a parade of shops, churches, medical facilities, "The Hoppers" public house and other amenities.

K2, a new leisure centre for Crawley, was opened in November 2005 on land formerly belonging to Thomas Bennett School.
