= Bewbush =

Area of Crawley in West Sussex, England

Coordinates: 51.1051°N 0.2207°W

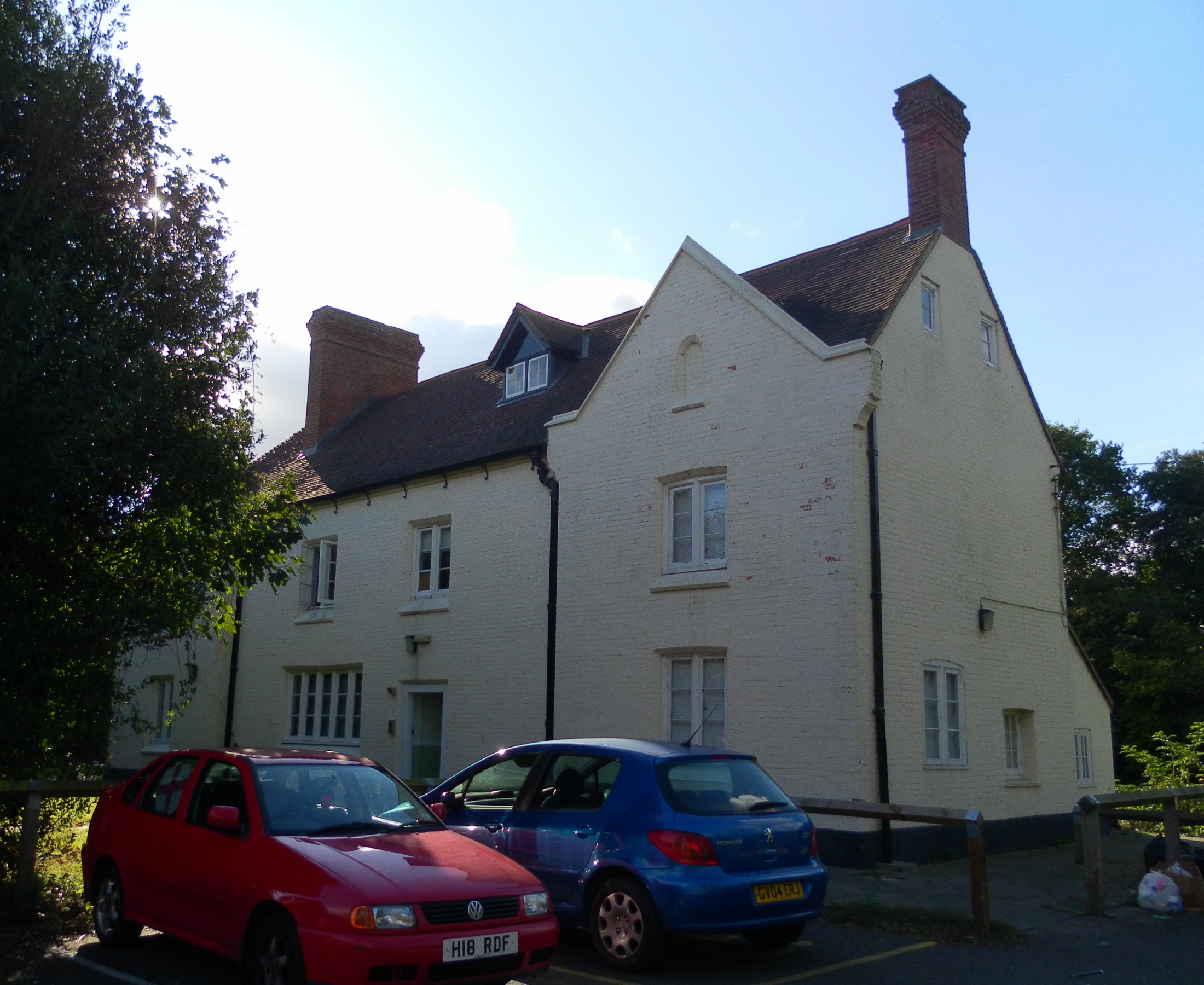

- Location within West Sussex
- Population: 9,081
- OS grid reference: TQ245355
- District: Crawley
- Shire county: West Sussex
- Region: South East
- Country: England
- Sovereign state: United Kingdom
- Post town: CRAWLEY
- Postcode district: RH11
- Dialling code: 01293
- Police: Sussex
- Fire: West Sussex
- Ambulance: South East Coast
- UK Parliament: Crawley

Bewbush is one of 14 neighbourhoods in Crawley in West Sussex, England. Bewbush is located in south west Crawley and is bordered by Broadfield to the south, Ifield to the north, Kilnwood Vale to the west and Gossops Green to the north east. The neighbourhood has a population of approximately 9,000.

== History ==
A park was recorded at Bewbush as early as 1295. It was a manor which later became known as the Holmbush Estate. The manor belonged for most of the twentieth century to the Clifton Brown family. In 1973, some 300 acres (1.2 km^{2}) were purchased by Crawley Borough Council.

The manor house was first mentioned in the early 14th century, although this no longer remains. A building with some 17th-century elements remains, although it was clad in brick in the 19th century. The building now stands amid modern developments in the neighbourhood.

The borough council began development of the new neighbourhood of Bewbush in 1974, with a leisure centre opening in 1984, and a shopping parade the following year. Additional land was brought into the borough of Crawley from Lower Beeding in 1983 to see the extension of the neighbourhood to reach its capacity population of 9000. Development of the neighbourhood continued into the 1990s.

== Governance ==
Bewbush neighbourhood is a co-terminus with the local government ward of Bewbush in the Borough of Crawley. It is also a ward of the upper-tier authority of West Sussex County Council. The neighbourhood forms part of the parliamentary constituency of Crawley.

== Demography ==
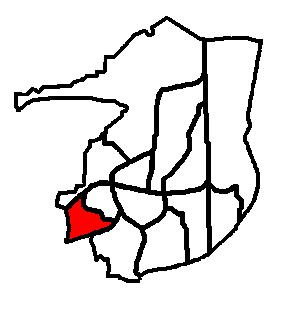

As at the 2001 census, the ward had a population of 9081. The neighbourhood has a younger population than the national average, with some 77% of residents being aged under 45, compared to 60% nationally. This is also reflected in the average age of the residents at 29, compared to 37 nationally.

Around 90% of the properties in the neighbourhood are terraced properties or flats. The vast majority of the properties were originally council-owned, with over one-third remaining owned by the local authority of other social landlords.

There is an ethnically diverse population in the neighbourhood, with a large proportion (17.3%) of black and ethnic minority groups represented. This is reflected in the area's large Hindu and Muslim populations which are both well above the national averages at 9% and 5% respectively.

In terms of social classification, the neighbourhood is made up of approximately 45% in the ABC1 grouping, compared to the national figures of around 51%.

== Education ==
Bewbush is served by two primary schools. The first school to open in the neighbourhood was Bewbush First School in 1978. This was shortly followed by Bewbush Middle School in 1982, with Waterfield First School opening officially in 1985. Bewbush first and middle schools were closed in 2004 when the three-tier education model was amended, and a new school - Bewbush Community Primary School, though it is currently called The Bewbush Academy Primary School, opened in the middle school buildings in September of that year. At the same time, Waterfield First School was extended to become Waterfield Primary School.

== Other Facilities ==
There is a Church of England church named for Saint Mary Magdalene in the west of the neighbourhood. At the neighbourhood centre, alongside the primary school is a Sure Start Children and Family Centre and a doctor's surgery. However, in March 2007, the local authority announced its intention to redevelop the area of central Bewbush. In 2009 the closure and demolition of the Bewbush Leisure Centre and The Dorsten public house took place, with the creation of a smaller pavilion style community building next to where the leisure centre had been. The new pavilion opened for use on 14 May the same year. A new park opened on 27 July 2009 on land that was previously part of Bewbush Primary School, which serves as a replacement for the old Bewbush Leisure Park. It holds various new playground equipment and England's first training area for Parkour Public transport is provided by the Metrobus bus routes, which include the 24-hour Crawley Fastway guided bus route to the Crawley Town centre and Gatwick Airport.
