= Ifield, West Sussex =

Suburb of Crawley, West Sussex, England

Coordinates: 51.1234°N 0.2073°W

Ifield
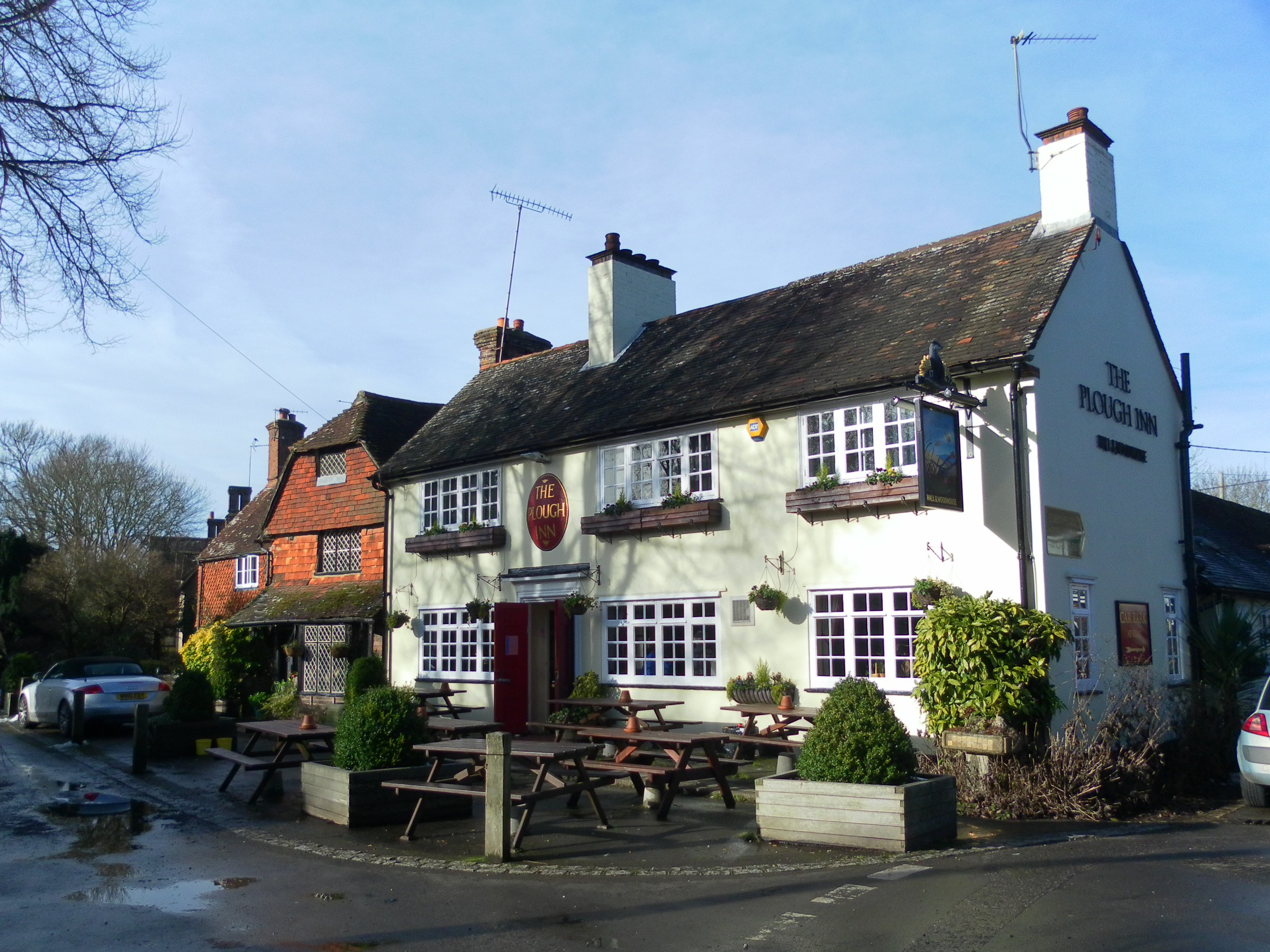
- Plough Inn and Cottages

- Location within West Sussex
- Population: 8,882 (Ward. 2011 Census)
- OS grid reference: TQ255375
- District: Crawley
- Shire county: West Sussex
- Region: South East
- Country: England
- Sovereign state: United Kingdom
- Post town: Crawley
- Postcode district: RH11
- Dialling code: 01293
- Police: Sussex
- Fire: West Sussex
- Ambulance: South East Coast
- UK Parliament: Crawley

Ifield is a former village and now one of 14 neighbourhoods within the town of Crawley in West Sussex, England. Ifield is in the west of the town and is bordered by Ifield West, Horsham, Langley Green to the north east, West Green to the east across the ring road and Gossops Green and Bewbush to the south across the Arun Valley railway line.

== History ==
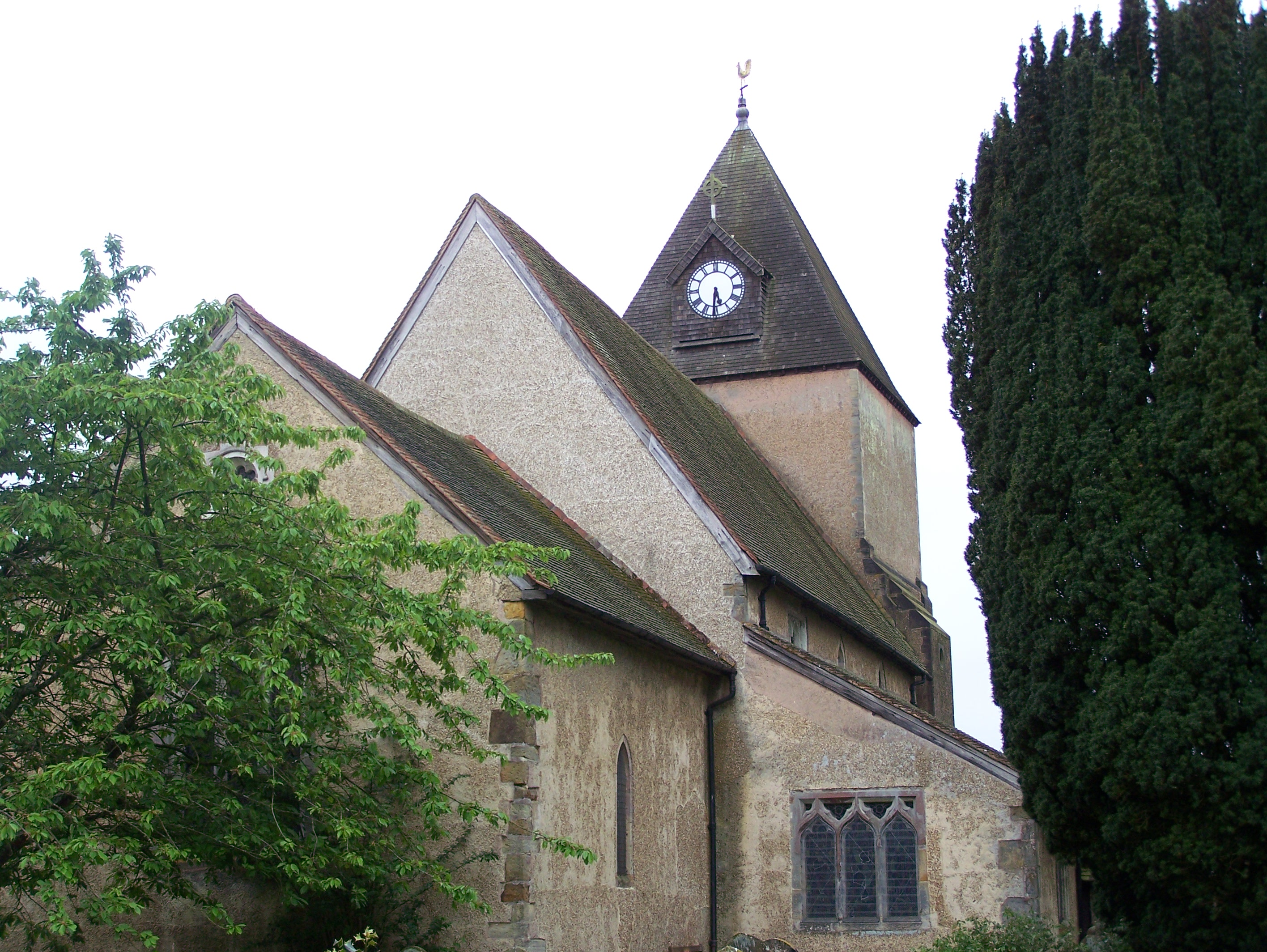
St Margaret's Church, Ifield. Buried here are Mark Lemon and the family of Denzil Holles

The name Ifield is derived from "Yew-field". There were many Yew trees in the parish, and some can be seen in the churchyard of St Margaret's Church. Ifield contains some of the most historic parts of Crawley, and there is a mention in the Domesday Book: "it is and was worth 20 shillings", where Ifield was spelt Ifelt.

Locally there is much evidence of Saxon iron works and a stretch of Roman Road still exists today known locally as the "Quarter Mile". St Margaret's Church was built in the 13th century. It contains both the grave of Mark Lemon (the first editor of Punch), and the Holles family vault. Adjacent to St Margaret's Church is the Ifield Barn Theatre. The old parish of Ifield contained most of the western part of modern-day Crawley, and the old village is on the very western edge of the new town. As well as containing two modern churches, St.Leonards in Langley Green and St.Albans in Gossops Green, Ifield Parish also contains a Friends' Meeting House. Founded in 1676, it was the first purpose-built meeting place for the Quakers anywhere in the world.

Denzil Holles was created Baron Holles of Ifield in 1661, after his part in the restoration of Charles II of England. The peerage became extinct after his grandson died unmarried and without issue. Denzil was buried in Westminster Abbey, but his family are interred here.

A V-1 flying bomb landed in Ifield during World War II. It damaged the village school and wounded one local man who remained slightly brain damaged for the rest of his life.

In 1931 the civil parish had a population of 4680. On 1 April 1933 the parish was abolished and merged with Crawley.

== Education ==
There are five schools in Ifield neighbourhood:

- Primary Schools: St.Margaret's Church of England Primary School and Mill Primary Academy
- Secondary School: Ifield Community College
- Special Schools: Manor Green School and Manor Green College

== Ifield station ==
Ifield station is located on the south side of the neighbourhood on the border with Gossops Green neighbourhood. The station is part of the Arun Valley line and was opened in 1907 as 'Ifield Halt'. Southern services run to Three Bridges and London Victoria from Platform 1 and Horsham from Platform 2. The level crossing that used to be in operation was replaced by the footbridge that now connects the two platforms.

== Ifield Village Conservation Area ==
Originally the area around the church was designated a conservation area in 1981 and was later expanded to include Ifield village green, Tweed Lane and Rectory Lane. A further expansion in 2013 added Ifield Green and Langley Lane.

== Ifield Water Mill and Mill Pond ==
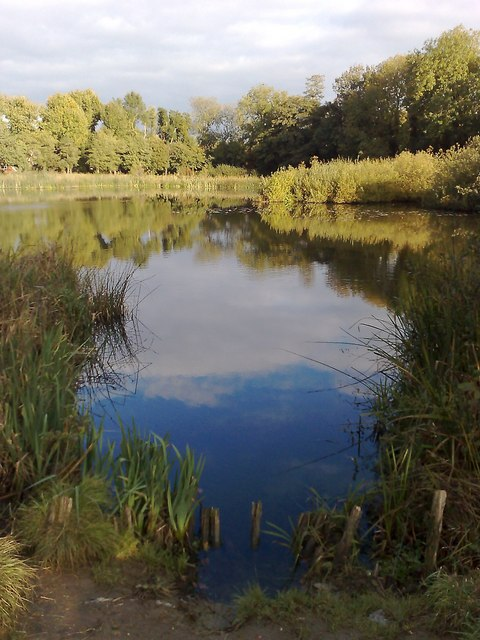
Pond at Ifield, by the mill

Ifield Mill Pond lies between Bewbush, Gossops Green and Ifield West. It is the source of the River Mole which runs north to the River Thames above Teddington Lock. In 1683 Ifield Water Mill, a corn mill, was built in the north of the pond; it used water from the mill pond to turn its water wheel. It was rebuilt in 1817 and is now being restored. The restoration has been led by a team of volunteers and spearheaded by Ted Henbery MBE, who has spent 34 years on the project after his son discovered the disused site in 1974. A second project to upgrade the Mill Pond concluded in July 2015 after £6.5 million was spent upgrading the dam, finished £1 million under budget. The Mill Pond is considered to be "the most important wetland site in Crawley" and supports a rich bird community.

== Ifield Barn Theatre ==
The theatre is situated in Ifield, to the north of the 13th century church of St Margaret. The theatre buildings were converted from a group of agricultural buildings mainly based on a tithe barn and former Granary.

== Ifield Cricket Club ==
Cricket was first recorded to have been played in Ifield in 1721, on the green. As of the 2022, Ifield CC 1st XI play in the Division 3 East of the Sussex Cricket League.
