= Gossops Green =

Area of Crawley, West Sussex, England

Coordinates: 51.1139°N 0.2061°W

- Location within West Sussex
- OS grid reference: TQ255365
- District: Crawley
- Shire county: West Sussex
- Region: South East
- Country: England
- Sovereign state: United Kingdom
- Post town: CRAWLEY
- Postcode district: RH11
- Dialling code: 01293
- Police: Sussex
- Fire: West Sussex
- Ambulance: South East Coast
- UK Parliament: Crawley

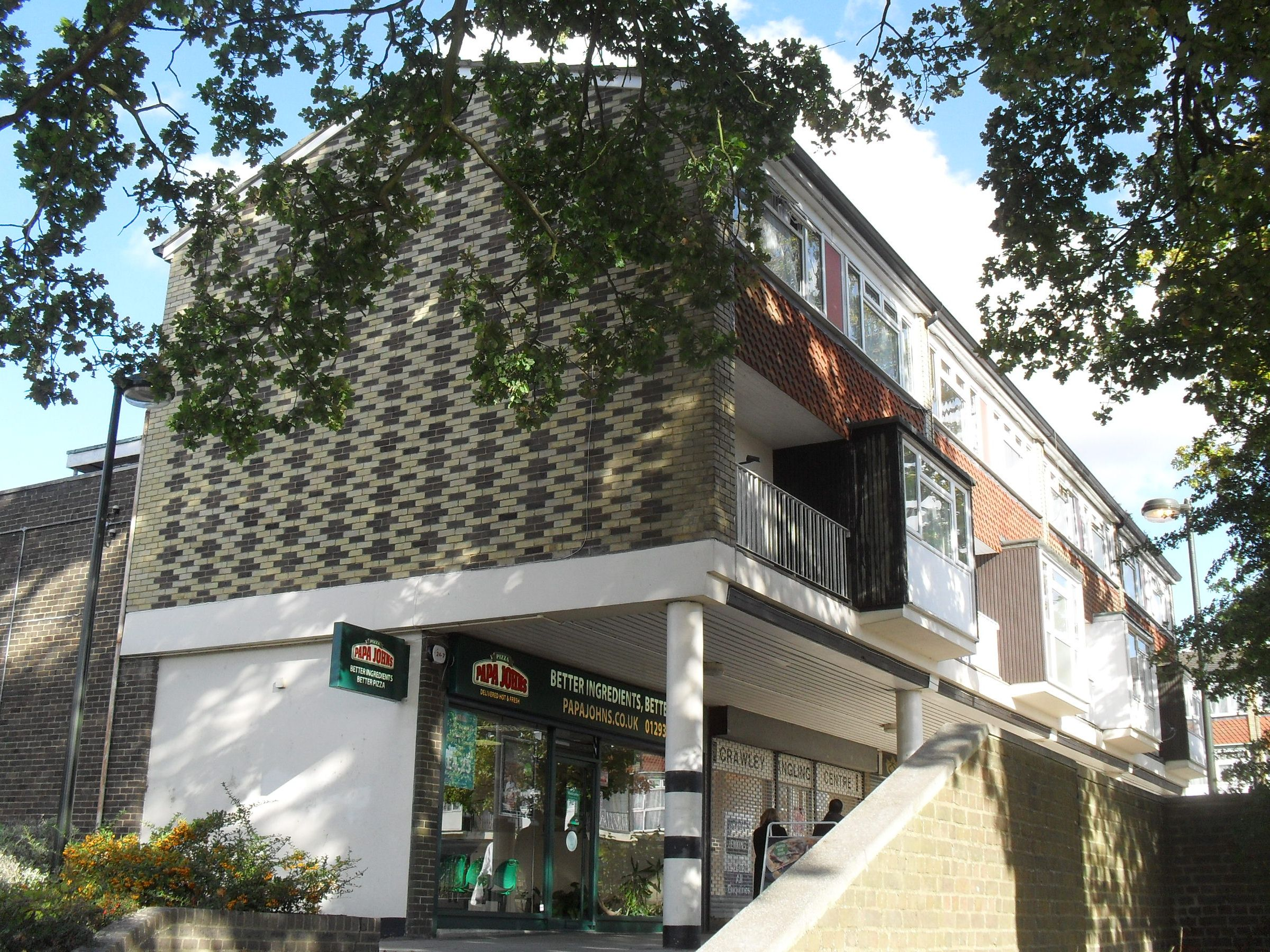
Gossops Green Shopping Parade

Gossops Green is one of 14 neighbourhoods within the town of Crawley in West Sussex, England. Gossops Green is located in the west of the town and is bordered by Bewbush to the south west, Ifield to the north and Southgate to the east across the ring road. Gossops Green is also a local government ward.

== History ==
=== Before 1946 ===
There is mention of Gossipsgreen on a map dated 1795. Maps in the first half of the 1800s show Gossipsgreen in varying layouts surrounded by farmland and close to a few small estates. Gossipsgreen amounted to a hamlet along the north side of what is now known as Gossops Green Lane. The main road ran east–west through the settlement. At the west end the road turned north towards the village of Ifield passing The Craigans, a house with gardens which was demolished and developed as private housing in the 1970s. To the east the road ran to Crawley through what is now Goffs Park and West Green.

A road led south from Gossipsgreen approximately along what is now Dower Walk, past Dower House and Woldhurstlee estate and on towards Buxwood (later Buckswood) Farm. Woldhurstlee was demolished during the New Town development. The site of the house is now in public woodland off Buckswood Drive.

The railway was built in the 1830s to the north of Gossipsgreen and ran by Hazelwood, a wooded area behind the hamlet, then past The Craigans before dividing Ifield Mill Pond to the west. Ifield railway station was first a halt on the road leading from Gossipsgreen to Ifield.

During Victorian times, Gossipsgreen disappeared from published maps, though The Craigans, Dower House and Woldhurstlee continued to be marked. By 1946, a year before the formation of the Crawley Development Corporation, the hamlet reappeared on the map but the name had changed to Gossops Green.

=== 1946 and After ===
Crawley Development Corporation was formed in 1947 as a result of the New Towns Act 1946. At this time, Crawley had a population of 6,000 people. It was a declared objective that the New Town would be home to 50,000 people by 1961. It had achieved this by 1958 before Gossops Green was built.

According to A History of the County of Sussex (1987, Hudson et al., online), the new neighbourhood of Gossops Green was ninth and last of the original New Town communities laid out during 1956-7 and built between 1958 and 1961. Later developments include The Holy Trinity School (1967), Hillmead and Parkhurst Close (formerly The Craigans) and private housing between The Holy Trinity School and Buckswood Drive (1970-80s).

The old road into Ifield was reconstructed as an extension to Ifield Drive leading into another new neighbourhood of Ifield over a manually operated railway crossing similar to that still found down the line at Littlehaven railway station. The road name was changed to Craigans (after the adjacent, demolished house of the same name) after the construction of a road bridge over the railway at Overdene Drive, following which the railway crossing was closed.

== Education ==
=== Primary ===
Gossops Green Community Primary School has approximately 500 pupils from 4 to 11 years old. It is a feeder school for Ifield Community CollegeThe Holy Trinity CoE School as well as others.

=== Secondary ===
The Holy Trinity School is a voluntary aided church school of approximately 1200 pupils between 11 and 19 years old. It takes pupils from a wide area including Horsham and Crawley Down.

== Transport ==
Gossops Green's main road; Gossops Drive

Gossops Green is on the A23 trunk road which was the main London to Brighton route before the M23 motorway was opened in the 1970s, which by-passed Crawley. The main estate road is Gossops Drive which leads off the A23 and links up with Mowbray Drive in Bewbush.

Ifield railway station serves western Crawley and is on the Arun Valley Line from Three Bridges to Horsham and Bognor Regis and the station is on the northern edge of the neighbourhood. Trains run regularly to and from London (45-minute journey) and Gatwick Airport (10-minute journey). When the station first opened in 1907, it was briefly known as Lyons Crossing Halt (then Ifield Halt), possibly because Lions Farm and fish pond used to stand here alongside the railway on the site now occupied by Hillmead.

Regular buses run to and from Crawley town centre along Gossops Drive and between Horsham and Gatwick Airport along Gossops Drive & Overdene Drive.

== Religion ==
=== Church of England ===
St. Alban's Church.

=== Catholic ===
St. Theodore of Canterbury Roman Catholic Church.

=== Spiritualist ===
Crawley Spiritualist Church, Capel Lane.

== Economy ==
Being a neighbourhood, there is no industry in Gossops Green. Many residents work in the town, on the industrial estate at Manor Royal and at Gatwick Airport, which is in Crawley. There is a significant number of people who take the train to work in places like London, Croydon and Horsham.

In Gossops Green, employment is limited and is mainly in the retail sector at the shopping parade though some local people may be employed at the schools and small service-sector employers.

== Government ==
=== Crawley Borough Council ===
Gossops Green has two councillors elected to the Borough Council. The council elects a mayor every year who then chairs full council meetings and undertakes ceremonial duties. There is also an executive, of which a leader is elected annually by the council and the leader selects seven councillors to manage portfolios, like a cabinet. The Council maintains a dedicated web page for the neighbourhood, which shows demographic statistics and useful contacts and community information.

=== West Sussex County Council ===
The neighbourhood forms part of the Bewbush, Gossops Green and Southgate constituency and has one elected member.

=== UK Parliament ===
The Crawley constituency has one MP.

== Sources ==
- Hudson T.P. (Ed), A History of the County of Sussex. 1987, Vol 6 Part 3, online last accessed 4 January 2010
- Pre-1946 maps and Crawley Development Corporation records are located at Crawley Library in the local studies reference section.
- Other Wiki references and external websites are noted.
