= Holy Trinity School, Crawley =

The Holy Trinity Church of England Secondary School

Location
- Buckswood Drive; Crawley, West Sussex, RH11 8JE; England; 51.1057°N 0.2098°W

Information
- Type: Voluntary aided school
- Religious affiliation: Church of England
- Established: 17 December 1969
- Local authority: West Sussex
- Department for Education URN: 126098 Tables
- Ofsted: Reports
- Head teacher: Reverend Millwood
- Age: 11 to 18
- Enrolment: 1300
- Houses: Canterbury, Durham, Winchester, York
- Website: www.holytrinity.w-sussex.sch.uk

The Holy Trinity Church of England Secondary School is a voluntary-aided comprehensive school in Crawley, West Sussex, England. The school has a roll of around 1300 students.

The school is a Church of England Christian school with a chaplain, chapel services, holy communion and worship. The current executive head is Reverend Chrissie Millwood.

The school is run by the Church of England and has been since its opening in 1969; some of the original buildings still exist.

== History ==
The Holy Trinity School is believed to have been the first purpose-built Church of England comprehensive school in the country. Although the school started to take pupils in September 1967, it was not opened officially until 17 December 1969, when the Queen came to open the school.

== Sport ==
The school has a history of success within its basketball programme, having won the nationwide basketball U15 National Schools Conference, alongside becoming national champions in the U19 and U15 categories in 2015. The programme has produced a number of players who have gone on to represent both the national team and compete overseas in the US.

== Records ==
Holy Trinity has appeared in the Guinness Book of Records for holding the longest continuous basketball rally. Holy Trinity smashed the record of 60 hours and 3 seconds (set by Japan) and pushed the record to just over 72 hours. The record was set over 13–16 July 2007. The school no longer holds the record. It was raised to 81 hours in 2008 in Tenerife.

== School productions ==
The drama and music departments work with pupils to create productions every November, alternating between musicals and straight plays. Some productions are:

- Wendy and Peter Pan 2016
- Les Misérables 2015
- Beauty and the Beast 2014
- Oliver! 2013
- A Midsummer Night's Dream 2012
- Back to the 80s 2011
- Arabian Nights 2010
- Hairspray 2009
- Animal Farm 2008
- Seussical 2007
- Little shop of Horrors 2005
- Beauty and the Beast 2004
- Grease 2003
- Tell me it's not true 2002

== Model United Nations and Debating Society ==
Until 2011 the school held an annual Model United Nations Conference around the beginning of July. The conference brought pupils from schools around the area together to debate and resolve problems together.

The Holy Trinity School also had a permanent Debating Society, meeting once a week to debate on key subjects concerning the school and the world. As well as hosting their own Model UN at the school, the Debating Society takes part in Model UN meetings at other schools. The Society (and the school in general) takes part in the National MACE Speaking competition each year; the competition is run by the English-Speaking Union. For three consecutive years the school has progressed beyond the first round of the competition.
