= St Wilfrid's Catholic School =

- Coat of arms of the School

Location
- Old Horsham Road; Crawley, West Sussex, RH11 8PG; 51.1097°N 0.2031°W

Information
- Type: Voluntary Aided Comprehensive
- Motto: In Omnibus Labora (Labour in all things)
- Religious affiliation: Catholic
- Established: 1953; 73 years ago
- Founder: Michael O'Reilly
- Local authority: West Sussex County Council
- Specialist: Business & Enterprise
- Department for Education URN: 126095 Tables
- Ofsted: Reports
- Head: Andrew Clarke
- Lay Chaplain: Claire Franke
- Gender: Mixed
- Age: 11 to 18
- Enrolment: 1,218
- Houses: Augustine, Benedict, Catherine, Dominic, Edith and Francis
- Colour: Blue Purple Red Green Pink Orange Navy Blue
- Website: www.stwilfrids.com

St Wilfrid's Catholic School is a voluntary aided comprehensive Catholic secondary school in Crawley, West Sussex, England for pupils aged 11 to 18. It caters for 1,218 pupils in years 7 to 13, including 46 in its sixth form.

== History ==
St Wilfrid's Roman Catholic (Aided) modern school opened in 1953 on its current campus in Crawley New Town to provide Catholic secondary education for the children of the town. At first, based in an old manor house, additional buildings were developed over the next ten years to accommodate increasing numbers. In 1967, the school became comprehensive.

Further increases in numbers on roll led to changes in 1970 which saw the school change to become an upper school providing education for pupils aged 13 to 18, with younger pupils attending one of the two newly opened middle schools in the town: Holy Cross Intermediate School and Notre Dame Intermediate School. This arrangement continued until 1996, when falling rolls led to a return to the school becoming a full secondary accepting pupils aged 11+.

From 2007, preparations went underway for a complete re-build of the school on its existing campus which opened in 2008.

== Campus ==
The campus for the school was originally based around the school building, named "Oakwood" which lies alongside Goffs Park. The residence was purchased by the diocese in 1952 to provide a Catholic secondary school in the new town. It was accompanied by 21 ac (8.5 ha) of land that makes up the modern campus. The school had new buildings completed in 2009. There are plans to build 14 additional classrooms, to provide additional teaching capacity and replace accommodation lost as a result of internal changes, and a glazed bridge link.

== Students ==
The school is comprehensive, providing education for around 1,200 pupils aged between 11 and 18 of all abilities. It sets its own admissions criteria in line with other voluntary aided schools. It provides education for pupils from Crawley, and the nearby towns of Horsham and East Grinstead and their surrounding villages.

== Headmasters ==
The following list contains all school headmasters since the School's founding in 1953, that can be reasonably sourced.

- 1953–1963 Michael O'Reilly
- 1972–1982 John Blake
- 1982–1991 Peter Bradshaw
- 1991–2006 Bernard G. Smith
- 2006–2007 Paul Walker
- 2007–2014 Jonathan Morris
- 2014–2026 Michael Ferry
- 2026–present Andrew Clarke

== Notable former pupils ==
- Robert Smith of The Cure
- Jeremy Cunningham of The Levellers
- Kevin Jeremiah, guitarist in The Feeling
- Ciaran Jeremiah, keyboardist in The Feeling
- Paul Stewart, drummer in The Feeling
- Timothy Innes, actor known for his role in the Netflix series The Last Kingdom
