= Fast Track (British TV programme) =

- Programme titles
- Genre: Non-fiction television series
- Created by: BBC
- Presented by: Fiona Foster; Rajan Datar
- Country of origin: United Kingdom
- Original language: English

Production
- Production location: United Kingdom
- Running time: 30 minutes

Original release
- Network: BBC World News
- Release: 12 January 2013 – 1 February 2014

Related
- The Travel Show

Fast Track is a 30-minute travel news TV show which was broadcast on BBC World News. Individual segments were also broadcast on BBC News Channel.

== Presenters ==
The programme was presented originally by Gwenan Edwards, then Rajan Datar and Fiona Foster. There were also regular segments including Widget of the Week, Events and the Best of the Web.

Other presenters included: Simon Calder, Akhtar Khan, Michelle Jana-Chan and Carmen Roberts. Both Datar and Roberts are amongst the main presenters on the successor programme; with Calder presenting a viewer questions segment.
