= Michael Joseph Smith =

American composer and pianist (1938-2022)

- Born: August 13, 1938; Tiline, Kentucky, US
- Died: April 10, 2022 (aged 83); Tyringe, Sweden
- Genres: Classical, jazz, avant garde
- Occupation(s): Composer, businessman
- Instrument: Piano
- Years active: 1955–2022
- Labels: Beta Fish

Michael Joseph Smith (August 13, 1938 – April 10, 2022) was an American composer and pianist born in Tiline, Kentucky. At the age of 6 years, he gave his first concert of original solo piano music in Nashville, Tennessee. After serving in the United States Navy, he studied electro-acoustic music, moving between Boston and New York City, and became involved with the New England Conservatory of Music and the Juilliard School. During this period, he developed a philosophy and notation form of his original music, titled Geomusic, and composed works with this method for various chamber groups, solo piano, and symphony orchestra.

Throughout his career, Smith released 55 recordings of original compositions in 17 countries, featuring artists Jonas Hellborg, Steve Lacy, Michael Shrieve, Danny Gottlieb, Nancy Wilson and Sarah Vaughan. Regarded as a pioneer of computer-assisted composition, a film portrait of his life titled In Spiritual Exile was premiered in Sweden in 1983, and in the United States in 1984 via National Public Television Network (PBS). In addition, two further films were released about Smith, both titled Virtuosi Studies 1 and 2.

In 2009, Smith co-founded WR Entertainment with James F. Cardwell, Ryan Wiik, Alan E. Bell, Duane M. Eberlein, Øyvind Holm-Johnsen and Steinar Larsen, and was included in the Swedish Musical Heritage project by the Royal Swedish Academy of Music. Sick and in palliative care for the later years of his life, Smith died from cancer on April 10, 2022.

== Career ==
Smith embarked on his first European concert tour in 1970, completed his first recordings in Italy and developed an interest in Jazz and improvisation. He moved to Paris in 1972 and completed concert tours and recordings in Western Europe and America with Steve Lacy, Anthony Braxton and others. From 1975 to 1976, he recorded various albums in Europe and America and toured, mostly solo, Italy, Poland, East Germany, Hungary, Western Europe, South America and Scandinavia. He also completed his first recordings with computer and piano in conjunction with Swedish composers Tamas Ungvary and Sten Hanson. In 1977, he was admitted to the Swedish Composers Society, and in 1979, he became a member of the International Society for Contemporary Music.

He returned to the United States in 1980 as a composer-in-residence in Atlanta, Georgia. There he completed three ballet projects with various contemporary dance ensembles which culminated in world premiers of the works in Atlanta at the Fox Theater, with the Stars of American Dance. He has been awarded numerous cultural prizes and stipends in Europe and Scandinavia, and has composed scores for films, television projects, and music for 10 major ballet works; mostly in Europe with stage design by Dr. Abelardo Gonzalez, choreographer Conny Borg, and companies the Royal Swedish Ballet.

In 1986, Smith entered a research program with the IBM Corporation of Scandinavia and the Roland Corporation, to compose real-time with computer composition software. In five years, he created 600 new works scored for various ensembles. In December 1988, he performed in Atlanta with prominent American artist Paul Chelko, and began a second artist-in-residency program in Atlanta that lasted until 1990. Since that time, Smith has written for the Tbilisi Chamber Orchestra, the Moscow Philharmonic, various European ensembles, ballet companies worldwide and has performed and premiered pieces in Tbilisi, Moscow, Brussels, Kassel (at Documenta IX), Beijing, Xian, Atlanta, Bordeaux (at Sigma), Sydney Opera House, South Africa TV, Hong Kong etc. He has also finished two film projects and hosted a performance series in Southern Sweden.

Smith co-founded WR Entertainment in September 2009 with a group of Norwegian and American businessmen, including James F. Cardwell, Ryan Wiik, Alan E. Bell, Duane M. Eberlein, Øyvind Holm-Johnsen and Steinar Larsen. On January 13, 2016, WR Entertainment became a publicly traded company on the Oslo Stock Exchange Merkur Market under the name WR Entertainment ASA.

In 2021, Smith was inducted in the Royal Swedish Academy of Music's Swedish Musical Heritage project as a "living musical heritage" of Sweden.

Smith died of "cancer and other complications" on 10 April, 2022 in Tyringe, Sweden, aged 83. He was cremated and his ashes buried at Södra Mellby Church in Lund, Sweden. His obituary lists him being known in Sweden for writing the original score to Swedish ballet Elivra Madigan.

== Personal life ==
Smith was married four times and had seven children. In 1972, he married Kerstin "Tina" Andersson, daughter of the mayor of Kristianstad in 1972 after meeting in Paris, and had two children, Tanja and Kassandra Smith. He married Chinese singer Wei Wei in 1995, and had three children. Wei and Smith divorced in 2004. In his later years, he married Loreta Greivyte.

== Discography ==
- Sidelines, feat. Steve Lacy. Improvising Artists Inc., (1976) (Improvising Artists)
- Faces LP, feat. Jonas Hellborg, Danny Gottlieb, Paul Chelko. Day Eight Music, Sweden (1986)
- All Our Steps..., feat. Jonas Hellborg, Michael Shrieve. Day Eight Music, Germany (1988)
- Reflection On Progress, (1972)
- Geomusic, Poland, (1977)
- Geomusic II, Sarahvah, France, (1975)
- La Musique Blanche, Le Chant Du Monde, France, (1975)
- The Dualities of Man, Horo Records, Italy, (1977)
- Elvira Madigan...And Other Dances, Horo Records, Italy, (1978)
- Moments, Creative Composers Recordings Inc., United States, (1984)
- Totality, Red Record, Italy, (1974)
- Geomusic 111-PL, feat. Zbigniew Namysłowski, Jacek Bednarek. Poland, (1976)
