= Warren Lieberfarb =

American business executive

Warren N. Lieberfarb
- Born: September 28, 1943 (age 83)
- Education: B.A. University of Pennsylvania; M.B.A. University of Michigan
- Spouse: Gail Kamer

Warren N. Lieberfarb (born September 28, 1943) is Chairman of Warren N. Lieberfarb & Associates, LLC (WNLA), a boutique consulting and investment firm based in Los Angeles focused on digital media technology and distribution.

== Biography ==
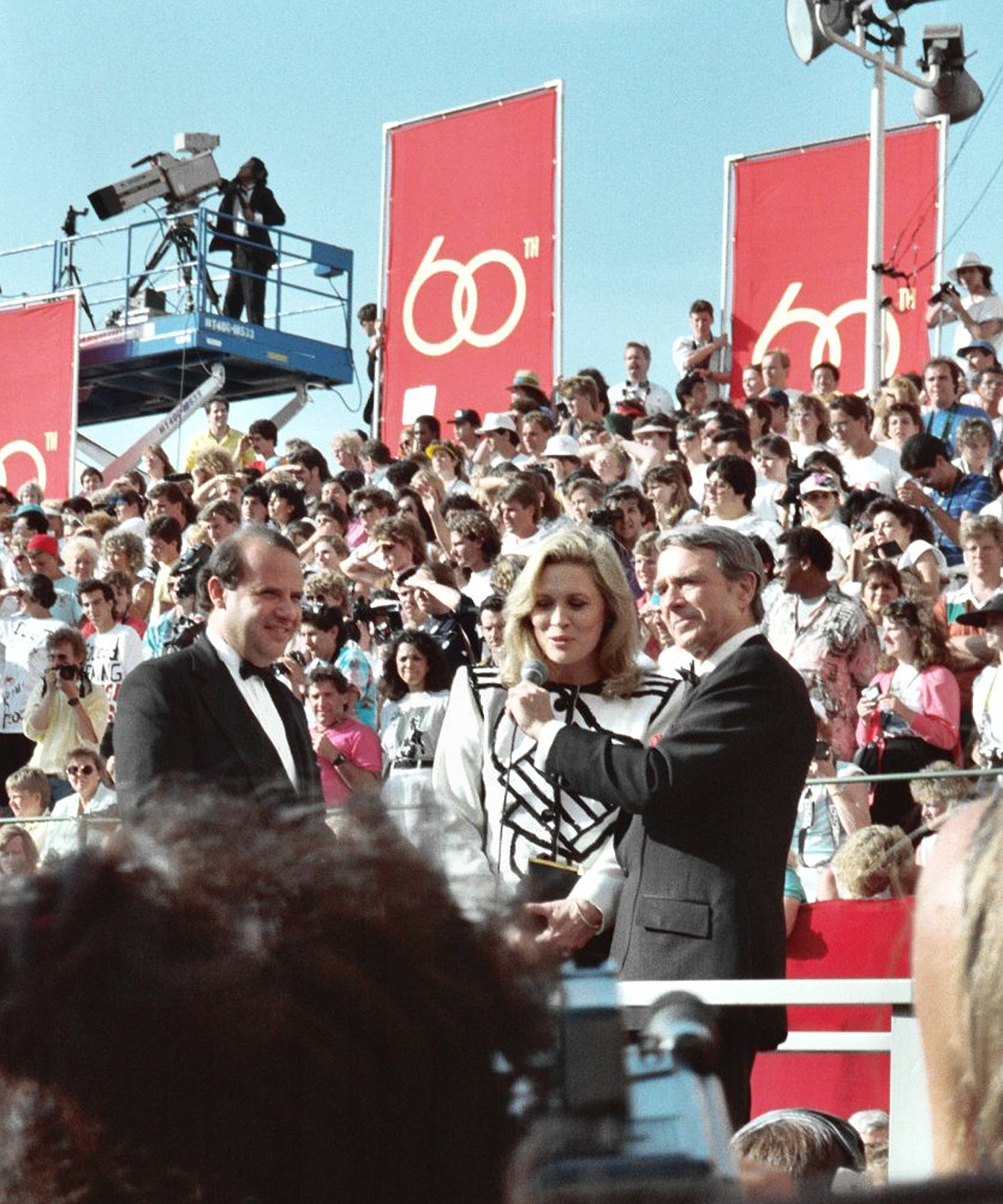
With then-girlfriend Faye Dunaway interviewed by Army Archerd at the 1988 Academy Awards

Lieberfarb was born to a Jewish family, the son of a children's clothing manufacturer. He graduated with a B.S. in economics from The Wharton School at the University of Pennsylvania and a M.B.A. from the University of Michigan. In 1967, he worked as a financial analyst for Paramount Pictures where he was introduced to the concept of films on a disc and was asked by then president Stanley R. Jaffe to research new home video technologies. In 1973, he took a job as vice president for telecommunications at 20th Century Fox. In 1984, he accepted a job as president of Warner Home Video (WHV), the home entertainment arm of Warner Bros. Entertainment, where he guided the company through nearly two decades of growth. Lieberfarb's most significant achievement at WHV was his widely acknowledged role as the architect of the DVD. He has been called “The Father of DVD” by Variety, Home Media Magazine and Media Play News. It was his initial vision that evolved into today's DVD, the format that revolutionized the home video business model from rental to purchase, driving unprecedented growth in studio home video revenues. In January 2003, James F. Cardwell was appointed his successor at WHV and Lieberfarb founded Warren N. Lieberfarb & Associates, LLC.

Lieberfarb currently serves on the board of directors of Hughes Telematics, Inc. (HUTC.OB). He has served as a member of the board of directors of Sirius Satellite Radio and thePlatform (since 2006 a subsidiary of Comcast Interactive Media). He also served on the University of Pennsylvania’s Board of Trustees, and served on the Library Board of Overseers and the Undergraduate Advisory Board of The Wharton School. Lieberfarb also served on the board of directors and Board of Trustees of the American Film Institute.

== Personal life ==
From 1987 to 1990, Lieberfarb was in a relationship with Faye Dunaway. He is married to investment adviser Gail Kamer. The couple lives in Brentwood, Los Angeles.
