= Duane M. Eberlein =

Duane Milton Eberlein is a Certified Public Accountant in California who has served as principal financial or accounting officer for four public companies over the past 30 years.

Since 1998, Eberlein has served as a member of the board of directors and chief financial officer for Phonechip, Inc., a privately held Nevada corporation. He has participated in numerous public offerings, both on NYSE and NASDAQ, and has twenty years of U.S. Securities and Exchange Commission (SEC) experience. His public experience includes service with Venture Catalyst, Inc. (former NASDAQ member), Caesars World, Inc. (former NYSE member), Great Bay Corporation (former NASDAQ member) and Caesars New Jersey, Inc. (former NASDAQ member).

For two years, Eberlein was a partner with the international accounting firm Ernst & Young. He is a graduate of San Diego State University.

Eberlein co-founded WR Entertainment in September 2009 with six other founders James F. Cardwell, Ryan Wiik, Alan E. Bell, Michael Joseph Smith, Øyvind Holm-Johnsen and Steinar Larsen.

Duane is currently CFO of WR Films Entertainment Group.
