= A Secular Humanist Declaration =

A Secular Humanist Declaration was an argument for and statement of support for democratic secular humanism. The document was issued in 1980 by the Council for Democratic and Secular Humanism (CODESH), now the Council for Secular Humanism (CSH). Compiled by Paul Kurtz, it is largely a restatement of the content of the American Humanist Association's 1973 Humanist Manifesto II, of which he was co-author with Edwin H. Wilson. Both Wilson and Kurtz had served as editors of The Humanist, from which Kurtz departed in 1979 and thereafter set about establishing his own movement and his own periodical. His Secular Humanist Declaration was the starting point for these enterprises.

== Table of Contents ==
1. Free Inquiry
2. Separation of Church and State
3. The Ideal of Freedom
4. Ethics Based on Critical Intelligence
5. Moral Education
6. Religious Skepticism
7. Reason
8. Science and Technology
9. Evolution
10. Education

== Signatories ==
Before the list of signatories, the declaration has the following disclaimer: "Although we who endorse this declaration may not agree with all its specific provisions, we nevertheless support its general purposes and direction and believe that it is important that they be enunciated and implemented. We call upon all men and women of good will who agree with us to join in helping to keep alive the commitment to the principles of free inquiry and the secular humanist outlook. We submit that the decline of these values could have ominous implications for the future of civilization on this planet."

=== United States ===
- George Abell (professor of astronomy, UCLA)
- John Anton (professor of philosophy, Emory University)
- Khoren Arisian (minister, First Unitarian Society of Minneapolis)
- Isaac Asimov (science fiction author)
- Paul Beattie (minister, All Souls Unitarian Church; president, Fellowship of Religious Humanism)
- H. James Birx (professor of anthropology and sociology, Canisius College)
- Brand Blanshard (professor emeritus of philosophy, Yale)
- Joseph L. Blau (Professor Emeritus of Religion, Columbia)
- Francis Crick (Nobel Prize Laureate, Salk Institute)
- Arthur Danto (professor of philosophy, Columbia University)
- Albert Ellis (executive director, Institute for Rational Emotive Therapy)
- Roy Fairfield (former professor of social science, Antioch)
- Herbert Feigl (professor emeritus of philosophy, University of Minnesota)
- Joseph Fletcher (theologian, University of Virginia Medical School)
- Sidney Hook (professor emeritus of philosophy, NYU, fellow at Hoover Institute)
- George Hourani (professor of philosophy, State University of New York at Buffalo)
- Walter Kaufmann (professor of philosophy, Princeton)
- Marvin Kohl (professor of philosophy, medical ethics, State University of New York at Fredonia)
- Richard Kostelanetz (writer, artist, critic)
- Paul Kurtz (Professor of Philosophy, State University of New York at Buffalo)
- Joseph Margolis (professor of philosophy, Temple University)
- Floyd Matson (professor of American Studies, University of Hawaii)
- Ernest Nagel (professor emeritus of philosophy, Columbia)
- Lee Nisbet (associate professor of philosophy, Medaille)
- George Olincy (lawyer)
- Virginia Olincy
- W. V. Quine (professor of philosophy, Harvard University)
- Robert Rimmer (novelist)
- Herbert Schapiro (Freedom from Religion Foundation)
- Herbert W. Schneider (professor emeritus of philosophy, Claremont College)
- B. F. Skinner (professor emeritus of psychology, Harvard)
- Gordon Stein (editor, The American Rationalist)
- George Tomashevich (professor of anthropology, Buffalo State University College)
- Valentin Turchin (Russian dissident; computer scientist, City College, City University of New York)
- Sherwin Wine (rabbi, Birmingham Temple, founder, Society for Humanistic Judaism)
- Marvin Zimmerman (professor of philosophy, State University of New York at Buffalo)

=== Canada ===
- Henry Morgentaler (physician, Montreal)
- Kai Nielsen (professor of philosophy, University of Calgary)

=== France ===
- Yves Galifret (executive director, Union rationaliste)
- Jean-Claude Pecker (professor of astrophysics, Collège de France, Académie des Sciences)

=== Great Britain (i.e. Scotland, Wales and England) ===
- Sir A. J. Ayer (professor of philosophy, Oxford University)
- H.J. Blackham (former chairman, Social Morality Council and British Humanist Association)
- Bernard Crick (professor of politics, Birkbeck College, London University)
- Sir Raymond Firth (professor emeritus of anthropology, University of London)
- Jim Herrick (then editor of The Freethinker)
- Zhores A. Medvedev (Russian dissident; Medical Research Council)
- Dora Russell (Mrs. Bertrand Russell) (author)
- Lord Ritchie-Calder (president, Rationalist Press Association)
- Harry Stopes-Roe (senior lecturer in science studies, University of Birmingham; chairman, British Humanist Association)
- Nicolas Walter (editor, New Humanist)
- Baroness Barbara Wootton (Deputy Speaker, House of Lords)

=== India ===
- B. Shah (president, Indian Secular Society; director, Institute for the Study of Indian Traditions)
- V. M. Tarkunde (Supreme Court Judge, chairman, Indian Radical Humanist Association)

=== Israel ===
- Shulamit Aloni (lawyer, member of Knesset, head of Citizens Rights Movement)

=== Norway ===
- Alastair Hannay (professor of philosophy, University of Trondheim)

=== Yugoslavia ===
- Milovan Djilas (author, former vice president of Yugoslavia)
- Mihailo Marković (professor of philosophy, Serbian Academy of Sciences & Arts and University of Belgrade)
- Svetozar Stojanović (professor of philosophy, University of Belgrade)

== See also ==
- Amsterdam Declaration 2002, a similar document from the International Humanist and Ethical Union
- Criticism of religion
  - Anti-clericalism
  - Separation of church and state
- Ethical veganism
- Evolution in public education
- Irreligion by country
- Jewish secularism
- Marxist humanism
- Secular Buddhism
- Secular morality
- Social philosophy
- The Necessity of Atheism, a 1811 essay written by the English poet Percy Bysshe Shelley
- The Necessity of Secularism, a 2014 essay written by the Center for Inquiry president Ronald A. Lindsay
- Universal Declaration of Human Rights, a similar document adopted in 1948 by the U.N. General Assembly
- Vegetarianism and religion
