= Bennett College (disambiguation) =

Bennett College is a historically black college for women in Greensboro, North Carolina.

Bennett College may also refer to:

- Bennett College (New York), a former women's college in New York state
- Sue Bennett College, a former college in Kentucky, United States
- Bennett Medical College, a defunct medical school in Chicago, Illinois

== See also ==
- Bennett University, a university in Uttar Pradesh, India
- Thomas Bennett Community College, a school in West Sussex, England
