= Alan E. Bell =

British technologist central to the development of the universal DVD format

- Born: 1949; Brixton, south London
- Died: May 15, 2016 (aged 67); Laos
- Education: Imperial College, London
- Occupations: Technologist, Engineer/Physicist
- Employer(s): RCA, IBM, Warner Brothers, Paramount Pictures
- Spouse: Patricia Wilkinson (m. 1972-2009)
- Awards: Fellow of Optical Society of America, 1984; Fellow of IEEE 2001

Alan Edward Bell was a technologist who played a central role in developing the universal DVD format and the DVD copy protection system. He worked at RCA, IBM, Warner Bros. Studios, and Paramount Pictures before co-founding WR Entertainment.

== Background, Education, and Death ==
Alan Bell was born in Brixton, south London, around 1949. His parents, Ivy (nee Smith) and Ted were a factory worker and a printer, respectively. The family moved to Crawley, West Sussex, in 1957 where Bell attended Thomas Bennett comprehensive school.

Bell studied at Imperial College, London, gaining a first class degree in physics in 1969. He was awarded a PhD degree in 1973 also from Imperial College for experimental work on the low-temperature magnetic and electrical properties of dilute alloys (Kondo effect) working under A. D. Kaplin. He then received a Sarnoff Fellowship to visit RCA Laboratories at Princeton, N.J. as a postdoctoral researcher working, for nine months, on liquid crystals using optical Raman scattering to determine the molecular ordering of the nematic phase.

Bell was married to Patricia (nee Wilkinson) from 1972 until their divorce in 2009. They had two children, Geoffrey and Melissa.

In May 2016, Bell was killed in a motorcycle accident while on vacation in Laos.

== Career ==
In 1974, Bell completed his postdoc and joined the technical staff at the RCA David Sarnoff Research Center. His research focussed on improving the recording characteristics of metallic recording media. The research led to the development of broadcast-quality optical video recording, the RCA videodisc.

Bell served as a Senior Scientist for Exxon’s Central Research Laboratory.

From 1982 to 2000, he worked for IBM Almaden Research Center. He was instrumental in the unification of the competing formats that resulted in the introduction of DVD and was a member of IBM's digital media team focused on copy protection technologies. The method and format were agreed between IBM, Intel, Matsushita, and Toshiba.

In 2000, Bell was named Executive Vice President of Technology at Warner Bros., Technical Operations.

In 2007, Bell became Executive Vice President and Chief Technology Officer for Paramount Pictures.

In September 2009, Bell co-founded WR Entertainment with six other founders James F. Cardwell, Ryan Wiik, Duane M. Eberlein, Øyvind Holm-Johnsen, Steinar Larsen and Michael Joseph Smith.

Alan Bell is most recognized for his role in the unification of the DVD format, and also led the negotiations that led to the development of DVD copy protection, without which the major studios would not have released content to DVD.

== Awards and recognition ==
In 1975, Bell received an RCA Laboratories Achievement Award.

In 1984, he became a Fellow of the Optical Society of America for his contributions to the DVD format.

In 2001, Bell became a fellow of the IEEE "for developments in optical data storage applications and technology".

Bell has authored or coauthored 29 issued US patents and numerous scientific papers.
