= Ryan Wiik =

Norwegian actor and entrepreneur (born 1981)

- Wiik at a Hollywood red-carpet event in 2007
- Born: Gunnar Ryan Wiik; September 23, 1981 (age 44)
- Occupations: actor, entrepreneur
- Years active: 2005 – present

Gunnar Ryan Wiik(born September 23, 1981) is a Norwegian actor and entrepreneur. Wiik resides in Los Angeles, California.

== Biography ==
Wiik grew up in the seaside town of Drøbak, Norway. In 2007, Wiik appeared as Jason in the thriller Timber Falls.

In September 2009, Wiik co-founded WR Entertainment with James F. Cardwell, Duane M. Eberlein, Alan E. Bell, Michael Joseph Smith, Øyvind Holm-Johnsen, and Steinar Larsen. On May 9, 2011, Daily Variety announced that WR Entertainment (through its subsidiary WR Films Entertainment Group) had acquired the motion-picture rights to all 83 novels in the best-selling Morgan Kane series, which had sold more than 20 million books to date. In January 2016, Wiik announced that he intended to star as the lead role in the planned Morgan Kane films, but later failed his audition.

On January 13, 2016, WR Entertainment became a publicly traded company on the Oslo Stock Exchange Merkur Market under the name WR Entertainment ASA. Two months later, a private placement took place. In December 2016, Wiik resigned from WR in response to a group of shareholders seeking his and Chairman James F. Cardwell's removal from the company. This process was later chronicled by WR investor Jan Henry Løken in VG's documentary The Ballad of Morgan Kane. Wiik stated in a press release that he resigned because of "creative differences." Cardwell was later voted out by the shareholders at an EGM.

== Litigation ==
In March 2017, Wiik filed a lawsuit in Los Angeles County Superior Court against WR's CEO, Tasmin Lucia-Khan. The suit, including allegations of defamation and sexual manipulation, made international headlines. Lucia-Khan filed a series of motions to quash service and an anti-SLAPP motion against Wiik.

In June 2017 WR Entertainment filed a suit against Wiik for multiple counts of fraud, misrepresentation, breach of fiduciary duty, conversion, breach of contract and unjust enrichment. Wiik filed a cross-complaint with multiple claims of breach of contract and fraud. In July 2017, WR Entertainment obtained an injunction from Oslo District Court (Norwegian: Oslo tingrett) to freeze 18.7 million shares of stock in Wiik's name, pending outcome of WR's fraud claim filed in Los Angeles Superior Court.

Wiik appealed to the Borgarting Court of Appeal (Norwegian: Borgarting lagmannsrett). The Borgarting Court of Appeal upheld the injunction where the 18.7 million shares would be frozen until Los Angeles County Superior Court had made their ruling.

In December 2017, Ryan Wiik reported a WR shareholder to the police for reckless behavior due to him posting parodic and satiric photos of Wiik.

On February 13, 2018, it was announced that a settlement had been reached between Wiik, WR Entertainment, and WR's CEO Lucia-Khan, where the pending lawsuits between the parties would be dismissed, and that Wiik had agreed to return the disputed 18.7 million shares back to WR Entertainment.
