= Warner Bros. Home Entertainment =

Home video distribution arm of Warner Bros. Entertainment

Warner Bros. Home Entertainment, Inc.
- Trade name: Warner Bros. Home Entertainment
- Formerly: WCI Home Video (1978–1980); Warner Home Video (1980–2016); Warner Bros. Discovery Home Entertainment (2023–2026)
- Type: Subsidiary
- Industry: Home entertainment
- Predecessors: List: HBO Home Entertainment (1980–2020); Turner Home Entertainment (1986–1999); Hanna-Barbera Home Video (1989–1991); Embassy Home Entertainment (1990–2010); Lorimar Home Video (1987–1989); KidVision (1992–2004); Legacy Releasing (1996–1999)
- Founded: 1978; 48 years ago
- Headquarters: 4000 Warner Boulevard, Burbank, California, U.S.
- Key people: David Decker (president, Content Sales)
- Products: Home video releases
- Services: Digital distribution Physical distribution
- Parent: Warner Bros. Entertainment
- Subsidiaries: Studio Distribution Services (joint venture with Universal Pictures Home Entertainment) (2021–2026)
- Website: warnerbros.com

Warner Bros. Home Entertainment, Inc. (doing business as Warner Bros. Home Entertainment; formerly known as Warner Home Video and WCI Home Video and sometimes credited as Warner Home Entertainment) is the American home video distribution division of Warner Bros. Entertainment. It was founded in 1978 as WCI Home Video. It is responsible for distributing the film and television library of Warner Bros. and other companies on various home media, digital, and streaming platforms. The company launched in the United States with twenty films on Betamax and VHS videocassettes in late 1979. The company later expanded its line to include additional titles throughout 1979 and 1980.

Some of the companies Warner Bros. Home Entertainment distributes for include Warner Bros. (Warner Bros. Pictures, Warner Bros. Pictures Animation, Warner Bros. Television Studios, Warner Bros. Animation), New Line Cinema, DC Entertainment, DC Studios, Viz Media, HBO (HBO Max, Cinemax and Time-Life Films), CNN, Cartoon Network (Cartoon Network Studios, Williams Street), Adult Swim, TBS, TNT, TruTV, Turner Classic Movies, Rooster Teeth (until its closure on May 15, 2024 and purchase by co-founder Burnie Burns's company Box Canyon Productions in February 2025), Discovery Channel, Animal Planet, TLC, HGTV, and Food Network, among others. Their releases are currently distributed in the United States and Canada by Studio Distribution Services, originally a joint venture between Warner Bros. Discovery Home Entertainment and Universal Pictures Home Entertainment, with select titles distributed through its manufacture-on-demand (MOD) solutions by Allied Vaughn.

== History ==
WCI Home Video was founded in 1978 and launched in the United States with twenty films on Betamax and VHS videocassettes in late 1979. Warner Bros. was the second Hollywood studio to enter the video market, following Twentieth Century-Fox, with the formation of Warner Home Video in 1979. The company later expanded its line to include additional titles throughout 1979 and 1980.

Warner Bros. began to branch out into the videodisc market, licensing titles to MCA DiscoVision and RCA's SelectaVision videodisc formats, allowing both companies to market and distribute the films under their labels. By 1985, Warner Bros. was releasing material under their own label in both formats. The origin of the DVD can be traced back to 1986, when Warner president Warren Lieberfarb first advocated for the development of a format to put movies on a five-inch optical disc, similar to the CD that had taken the music industry by storm a few years earlier. Titles from Warner Home Video are distributed and manufactured by Roadshow Home Video in Australia and New Zealand because of its film counterpart's films released by Village Roadshow.

In the early 1980s, Warner Home Video also experimented with the "rental-only" market for videos, a method also used by 20th Century Fox for their first release of Star Wars in 1982. Two known films released in this manner were Superman II (1980) and Excalibur (1981). Other films released for rental use include Dirty Harry (1971), The Enforcer (1976), Prince of the City (1981), and Sharky's Machine (1981). Warner executive Morton Fink devised a plan for dealers to rent films from the studios for a six-month period, but this idea was rejected by video dealers, as they had already found a way to decrease their inventory. Later, Warner Bros pioneered skipping the rental window entirely on videos such as Batman Returns (1992), Robin Hood: Prince Of Thieves (1991), and JFK (1991).

In 1990, Warner Home Video acquired the worldwide home video rights to the MGM/UA catalog. The $125 million purchase was used to finance MGM/UA's acquisition by the Pathé Communications Corporation. The intended 12½-year-long deal was cut short in February 2000, with MGM paying Warner Home Video $225 million to regain video rights to its 5,100-title film library. In exchange, Warner Home Video gained full control over the video rights to MGM's pre-1986 library, an asset the studio had acquired from Turner Entertainment Co., but due to a pre-existing licensing deal with MGM, was originally expected to expire in 2003.

In December 1996, Warner Home Video was one of the first major American distributors for the then-new DVD format in Japan, releasing the films Assassins (1995), Blade Runner: Director's Cut, Eraser (1996), and The Fugitive (1993) on DVD in Japan and in March 1997, in the United States with Twister (1996) also being a launch title for the region there. Warner Bros. executive Warren Lieberfarb is often seen as "the father of DVD". Lieberfarb's successor, Warner Bros. executive James F. Cardwell was recognized in paving the way for Warner Home Video's strategic positioning in next generation technologies such as High Definition DVD (HD DVD), electronic sell-through, and portable video. In 2003, Warner Home Video became the first home video releasing company to release movies only on DVD with no VHS equivalent.

Warner Bros. Home Entertainment logo used as corporate logo from 2016 until 2020

In 2009, Warner Home Video introduced the Warner Archive Collection (WAC), which allows the public to order custom-made DVDs of rarely seen films and television series from the Warner and Turner libraries. The films are also available as digital downloads. Warner Archive DVDs and downloads could be ordered online on Warner's website (WarnerArchive.com). As a companion to the WAC, Warner launched a new podcast series titled the "Golden History of Hollywood," which featured archival recordings from the studio's vault, including behind-the-scenes interviews with stars and radio editions of movies. By 2012, "manufactured-on-demand" (MOD) titles from Sony and MGM were also sold through the WAC. In 2013, Warner launched a beta Warner Archive Collection streaming service called "Warner Archive Instant." Beginning in April of 2016, WAC started making "a handful" of previously out-of-print titles available each month on DVD. That same year, WAC was also bringing classic films, like Father of the Bride (1950), Alfred Hitchcock's Suspicion (1941), and Who's Afraid of Virginia Wolf (1966), to Blu-ray for the first time.

Warner Bros. Home Entertainment print logo used from 2020 until 2024

From June 30, 2020 to January 12, 2026, Warner Bros. Home Entertainment had regained the home video rights to the post-1986 MGM catalog after 21 years, although pre-1986 titles continue to lack MGM logos on packaging. Starting in 2022, due to the finalization of the Warner Bros. Discovery merger, Warner Bros. Home Entertainment started distributing the television libraries of Discovery-owned networks including the flagship Discovery Channel and Animal Planet. In 2023, the joint company's first major project was the streaming launch of Max, which offered content from Warner Bros. and Discovery, along with titles from HBO, CNN, Cartoon Network, and more.

Corporate logo used from 2023 until 2026 as Warner Bros. Discovery Home Entertainment

In April 2025, the Warner Archive Collection's remastered 4K Ultra HD Blu-ray edition of John Ford's 1956 Western classic The Searchers won in five categories at the annual Home Entertainment Media Play Awards, taking the top prize of Title of the Year, as well as Blu-ray Disc of the Year, Best Restoration, Best Audio/Visual Quality, and Best Release of a Western.

In April 2026, Warner Bros. Discovery Home Entertainment won 15 awards at the annual Home Entertainment Media Play Awards. Awarded titles included HBO's The Penguin: The Complete First Season (TV on Disc of the Year and Best Drama), and Tom and Jerry: The Golden Era Anthology (Blu-ray Disc of the Year, Fan-Favorite Title of the Year, and Best Animation Release).

=== Studio Distribution Services ===
In January 2020, Warner Bros. Home Entertainment and Universal Pictures Home Entertainment announced they would partner on a 10-year multinational joint-venture. In North America, their physical distribution operations for Blu-ray, DVD, and 4K UHD were merged into a company named Studio Distribution Services, LLC. Internationally, Universal distributes Warner Bros.' titles in Germany, Austria, Switzerland (until 2025), Japan (until 2025), and Spain (since May 2022); while Warner distributes Universal's titles in the United Kingdom (until 2025), Italy (until 2024), and Benelux. In April 2020, the European Commission approved the merger. Since June 1, 2021, SDS' logo took the Warner Bros. Home Entertainment logo's place on the back covers of the home releases; while there have been several exceptions, mainly manufactured on demand titles including 4K (also steelbooks) and Blu-ray releases.

On August 4, 2026, it was announced that disc manufacturer Conectiv Supply Chain Solutions (formerly owned by Vantiva) had acquired SDS from Universal and Warner, uniting both manufacturing and distribution capabilities.
