= Fiona Foster =

British television presenter and journalist

Fiona Foster is a British television presenter and journalist who has also spent several years working in the United States. She was the main presenter on the BBC World travel programme Fast Track.

== Early life ==
Foster graduated from Durham University with a degree in Russian and French in 1983.

== Career ==
Foster worked at BBC Radio Oxford in 1985. She also worked as a waitress and an announcer for Greyhound. In 1992, she co-presented emergency response programme "999", where she travelled with a camcorder on the frontline, capturing events and rescues as they unfolded. Foster was one of the launch presenters of London News Network's London Tonight programme in 1993 together with Alastair Stewart, having previously worked as a financial presenter on the Breakfast Business segment of BBC Breakfast News.

=== ITV News ===
During the Iraq war in 2003 she presented for ITV News.

She is currently a reporter on ITV's current affairs programme Tonight. Foster has also appeared in the Celebrity Poker Club television series. She has provided the voiceover for a number of programmes in the …from Hell series such as Neighbours from Hell and Holidays from Hell.

Foster was the co-presenter of ITV's monthly programme "Missing" (similar to Crimewatch but featuring appeals on behalf of the National Missing Persons Helpline) alongside Alastair Stewart, which first aired in September 1993.

== Other ==
She presents Don't Get Done in the Sun, which was shown on BBC One from 20 May 2013.

== Personal life ==
She has two daughters with her husband, Tristan Hickey, and they live in North London.

In 2005 she appeared on the talk show Heads Up with Richard Herring to discuss her life, career and her love of poker.
