= The Travel Show (TV programme) =

- Created by: BBC News
- Presented by: Ade Adepitan; Rajan Datar; Carmen Roberts; Henry Golding; Christa Larwood; Simon Calder; Michelle Jana-Chan
- Country of origin: United Kingdom
- Original language: English

Production
- Production location: Various
- Running time: 30 minutes

Original release
- Network: BBC News (international feed); BBC News (UK feed); BBC Two
- Release: 27 February 2013 – present

Related
- Fast Track

The Travel Show is an international feed of BBC News channel travel programme. The new programme launched on 27 April 2013 and has the same programme title as a 1990s holiday programme broadcast on BBC Two.

Using a network of correspondents in London, Tokyo, Sydney, New York and Kuala Lumpur, the programme aims to provide unique insight into the world of travel. It first aired in the UK in late February, after Winter Olympics coverage, in a Friday morning slot on BBC Two. A Sunday evening slot was also added on the UK feed of BBC News channel in April 2014 and BBC iPlayer.

== Presenters ==
Presenter	Role	Base / other info
Ade Adepitan	Presenter	London
Christa Larwood	Presenter	London
Rajan Datar	Presenter	London
Benjamin Zand	Presenter / Producer	London
Carmen Roberts	Presenter	Tokyo
Henry Golding	Presenter	Kuala Lumpur
Simon Calder	Global Guru	
Lucy Hedges	Presenter	London
Mike Corey	Presenter	
Omar Mehtab	Presenter	London
Qasa Alom	Presenter	

Occasionally other BBC correspondents and travel bloggers appear as presenters such as blind backpacker Tony Giles, Emeline Nsingi Nkosi and Eva zu Beck.

== The Travel Show (1988–1997) ==
The Travel Show name was first used by the BBC for a BBC2 holiday programme presented by Penny Junor between 1988 and 1997. Like the BBC News programme, one of the main contributors to this magazine-style programme was the news channel's Global Guru Simon Calder, who joined The Travel Show in the last few years of its run to present reports. Before Calder, Matthew Collins and John Thirlwell were the presenters reporting from various locations around the world with John Kettley on hand to give weather advice for the week ahead, while an early 1990s refresh saw Carol Smillie and Paddy Haycocks join the reporting team, with The Travel Show providing a 'Moanline' for viewers to get in-touch with travel complaints.

In addition to the main programme, The Travel Show Guides was a half-hour spin-off which just focused on one location per week (for example, Ibiza or Southern California) whilst The Travel Show Traveller and The Travel Show UK Mini Guides were short-form filler programmes compiled from the main programme with the latter featuring a voice-over from Roger Wilkes.
