= Akhtar Khan =

British journalist and presenter

Akhtar Khan is a British-Indian broadcast journalist and has worked for multiple international broadcasters including BBC World News, BBC News 24, Sky News and CNBC Europe. He is a presenters of Fast Track, a weekly travel program on BBC World News, and has his own radio show on the BBC Asian Network.

== Career ==
In August 2003, Khan became one of the presenters of Fast Track, a weekly travel program on BBC World News. Khan has been a regular presenter at the erstwhile BBC News 24, now known as BBC News, apart from hosting his own show on BBC Asian Network. Khan has also been a freelance presenter for BBC Radio 5 Live. Additionally, Khan is a motivational speaker and host at corporate events.

As of September 2017, The Huffington Post described Khan as having "more than 20 years experience on both sides of the camera", covering areas related to "international affairs, geo-politics, health and fitness, entrepreneurship, current affairs, travel and tourism and, the film industry". Some of his notable reportage has included the September 11 attacks, the first beheading of ISIL and the 2016 United States presidential election.

Khan initially worked as a fund manager in the City of London Investment Trust, before becoming an entertainment journalist with CNBC Europe. Later, he became a film critic at Pearson TV and subsequently joined Sky News, where he became Royal Correspondent.

Khan is the roving ambassador for The Prince's Trust, officially representing the Prince of Wales at numerous events.

== Personal life ==
Khan's parents are from Hyderabad, India while Akhtar was born in London. Akhtar currently shuttles between London, Los Angeles and New York. He has been reported to have dated the Miss World 1999 pageant winner who was also crowned Miss India, Yukta Mookhey.
