= Ritchie Calder =

Scottish writer, journalist and academic

The Right Honourable The Lord Ritchie-Calder CBE

Member of the House of Lords Lord Temporal
- In office 5 July 1966 – 31 January 1982; Life peerage

Personal details
- Born: Peter Ritchie Calder; 1 July 1906 Forfar, Scotland
- Died: 31 January 1982 (aged 75) Edinburgh, Scotland
- Spouse: Mabel McKail (m. 1927)
- Children: 5 (including Nigel and Angus)
- Relatives: Simon Calder (grandson)
- Education: Forfar Academy
- Occupation: Author; journalist; academic
- Awards: Kalinga Prize (1960)

Peter Ritchie Ritchie-Calder, Baron Ritchie-Calder CBE (né Calder; 1 July 1906 – 31 January 1982), was a Scottish socialist writer, journalist and academic.

== Early life ==
Peter Ritchie Calder was born on 1 July 1906 in Forfar, Scotland, the youngest of four children of David Lindsay Calder, a linen worker, and Georgina Ritchie, the daughter of a master mason. He was educated at Forfar Academy, leaving the school at the age of 16.

== Career ==
Calder first worked as a journalist in Dundee and Glasgow, where he became noted as a socialist and peace activist; as science editor of the News Chronicle, he wrote under the name of 'Ritchie Calder'.

After moving to London before World War II, he accepted an appointment as the director of plans and campaigns at the Political Warfare Executive branch of the Government, which was responsible for the allied war propaganda effort. He wrote propaganda posters and leaflets and speeches for allied leaders. He was a member of the 1941 Committee, a group of liberal politicians, writers and other people of influence in the United Kingdom. In 1941 he became popular with his book Carry on London, which described the effects of the German bombardment of London, Coventry and other cities in Great Britain.

After the war Calder returned to his former activities as a writer and specialised in internationalism, the peace movement and in the public understanding of science. He worked also with the United Nations and was president of the National Peace Council and of the Campaign for Nuclear Disarmament. He also worked for the News Chronicle newspaper as science editor.

Sir Lawrence Bragg's original announcement of the discovery of the structure of DNA was made at a Solvay conference on proteins in Belgium on 8 April 1953 but went unreported by the UK press. He then gave a talk at Guy's Hospital Medical School in London on Thursday 14 May 1953, which resulted in an article by Ritchie Calder in the News Chronicle on Friday 15 May 1953, entitled "Why You Are You. Nearer Secret of Life".

Calder was an ardent peace activist and humanist. In 1955, Calder recorded and released an album on Folkways Records entitled Science in Our Lives. In 1980 he was one of the signatories of "A Secular Humanist Declaration", a statement of belief in democratic secular humanism, issued by the Council for Democratic and Secular Humanism ("CODESH"), now the Council for Secular Humanism ("CSH"). He was also one of the signers of the Humanist Manifesto. He was Montague Burton Professor of International Relations at the University of Edinburgh from 1961 to 1967, and received the 1960 Kalinga Prize for the Popularization of Science.

In 1961 he wrote: "One of the factors which has, perhaps, contributed to the warming up of the northern hemisphere is the increase of carbon in the atmosphere as a result of the industrialisation of the continents of Europe and America".

While employed at the Foreign Office, Calder was appointed Commander of the Order of the British Empire (CBE) in the 1945 New Year Honours.

He received a life peerage in the 1966 Birthday Honours. With a change of his surname to Ritchie-Calder, he was created Baron Ritchie-Calder, of Balmashanner in the Royal Burgh of Forfar on 5 July 1966.

== Personal life ==
Lord Ritchie-Calder and his wife Mabel Jane Forbes McKail had five children: science writer Nigel Calder (1931–2014); writer and historian Angus Calder (1942–2008); mathematician Allan Calder (1944–2023); educationist Isla Calder (1946–2000) and teacher Fiona Rudd (née Calder). He was also the grandfather of travel writer Simon Calder and the actor, writer and comedienne Gowan Calder.

== Death ==
Calder died on 31 January 1982, in Edinburgh, Scotland.

== See also ==
- List of peace activists

== Sources ==
- Trevor I. Williams, ‘Calder, Peter Ritchie, Baron Ritchie-Calder (1906–1982)’, rev. Oxford Dictionary of National Biography, Oxford University Press, 2004; online edn, Jan 2012 accessed 17 July 2013
- Author and Bookinfo.Com
