= Timber Falls =

- DVD cover
- Directed by: Tony Giglio
- Written by: Daniel Kay
- Produced by: Christopher Eberts; Kia Jam; Steve Markoff; Bruce McNall; Arnold Rifkin; Todd Shotz
- Starring: Josh Randall; Brianna Brown; Nick Searcy
- Cinematography: Toby Moore
- Edited by: Peter Mergus
- Music by: Henning Lohner
- Production companies: Rifkin-Eberts; Ascendant Pictures; A-Mark Entertainment; Film Tiger
- Distributed by: Slowhand Entertainment
- Release date: July 27, 2007
- Running time: 100 minutes
- Countries: United States; Romania
- Language: English
- Budget: $2.6 million
- Box office: $680,299

Timber Falls is a 2007 horror film directed by Tony Giglio and starring Josh Randall and Brianna Brown. It’s an international co-production between the United States and Romania.

== Plot ==
The film begins with a couple (Sarah and James) held captive and tortured in a dark dungeon. After Sarah frees herself from her binding, James tells her to run and he gets killed. Sarah runs away from a disfigured man in a black trench coat (Deacon) with a double blade sickle. When Sarah reaches the edge of a cliff, with nowhere to run, she jumps off and dies as she hits the ground.

The following scene shows another couple—Sheryl (Brianna Brown), and Mike (Josh Randall)—going on a hiking trip for the week. The park ranger advises them to either take the Willow Creek or the Donner Trail, but when they're hesitating which way to go, they meet a seemingly friendly woman (Ida) who recommends to them the Timber Falls Trail, which they ultimately decide to take. The two face a trio of unfriendly hunters while making love, who try to sell them their self-made alcohol and warn them to be careful about what they do in the woods. Disturbed by the hunters' attitude, Mike is about to pull out his gun, but Sheryl stops him from shooting them and the two leave. Sheryl convinces Mike to throw away his bullets. After meeting another park ranger (Clyde) and hiking down the trail, the couple sets up the camp. They have sex and go to sleep, unaware of a shadowy figure outside the tent that spies on them during the night.

In the morning, Sheryl goes to bathe at the lake. She then gets kidnapped by an unknown person. Mike wakes up and finds that Sheryl is missing. He tries to find her and sees two of the hunters that he and Sheryl encountered the previous day. He sees one of them holding one of Sheryl's towels. Believing that they kidnapped her, he hits one of them on the head with a log, causing the other to run away. After taking the hunter's shotgun, Mike demands that the hunter tell him where Sheryl is. He tells Mike he hasn't seen her since the day before. He tries to attack Mike with a knife, but Mike knocks him out by hitting him with the stock of the shotgun.

Mike leaves the hunter there and continues his search for Sheryl. He then gets his foot caught in a bear trap. Ida appears as he slowly faints. As he wakes up, he finds himself in Ida's cabin. She tends his wound and assures Mike that she will contact the sheriff via the radio upstairs. Mike becomes suspicious because Ida calls him by his real name Michael. He claims that no one calls him Michael except for his dead grandmother and accuses Ida of stealing his wallet and I.D. She denies this, but he begins demanding that she let him use the radio. Ida and Mike engage in a fight, ending with the wounded Mike knocking out Ida.

Mike rushes upstairs to use the radio, only to find it out of order. While hobbling around, he accidentally discovers a secret basement and goes down. Mike spots a shelf full of prematurely born fetuses in glass jars. He finds Sheryl tied up and gagged in a room and frees her, but at that very moment, they confront Deacon - Ida's brother. Mike tells Sheryl to run away as Deacon attacks him. Sheryl runs away with Deacon hot on her heels and bumps into Clyde on the way. She frantically asks him for help, but as she realizes that he's in cahoots with Deacon, Clyde knocks her unconscious and recaptures her.

Sheryl wakes up to find herself strapped to a chair. The family turns out to be a group of insane religious fanatics. After Ida describes having seen the couple having sex in their tent a few days previously, she and Clyde tell the couple that the punishment for their sins is to have a child for Ida and Clyde, due to Ida not being able to have a baby. Mike and Sheryl are forced to marry, and over the course of 3 days, Ida and Clyde force them to attempt to have a child and brutally torture them if they don't. Both Mike and Sheryl refuse to comply with their demand, for they know that if they have a baby, Ida and Clyde will kill them anyway.

During the couple's confinement, Deacon tries to rape Sheryl several times but fails due to Ida and Clyde's dissuasion. After a few days pass, Ida grows impatient and threatens Mike to torture Sheryl in front of him if he doesn't obey them. All of a sudden, Sheryl begins laughing hysterically. She tells Ida that she has already been two months pregnant with Mike before they went on the hiking trip and that the child was conceived in sin, leaving both Ida and Clyde in shock. Their evil plan now turns fruitless. Ida drops the scalpel she is going to mutilate Sheryl with, and Clyde consoles her.

Meanwhile, two of the hunters Mike and Sheryl met days before hear about the missing couple and presume that something strange is going on at Ida and Clyde's home (they saw Mike and Sheryl's car still in the parking lot, but when one of them talked to Clyde about it, he asserted that they already left). The two go there on the third night that Mike and Sheryl have been captured to investigate. They make a noise while breaking the glass on the front door. Ida and Clyde hear the glass tinkle and go to check it out, leaving Mike and Sheryl alone in the room. Mike tries to grab the scalpel and successfully cuts the rope holding his hands.

One hunter finds a secret door to the cabin's basement but is killed by Clyde, only after Mike manages to yell for help. The other goes down to the basement and gets shot dead by Ida. Ida and Clyde bury the dead hunters' bodies. Ida suggests aborting Sheryl's baby when Clyde suggests killing Mike and Sheryl and finding another couple. When Clyde gets back to the basement, Mike quickly stabs his neck and shoots Clyde in the head with his shotgun. Ida then gets to the basement and is shocked to find Clyde's corpse lying in a pool of blood. Mike attacks her, but she fights back and stabs his legs repeatedly. Sheryl knocks her unconscious with a shovel.

The couple exits the basement and prepares to leave the cabin. Mike tells Sheryl to run for help. She finds Clyde's walkie-talkie and tries to call the Rangers Post, but she faces Deacon again in the cabin and accidentally breaks the walkie-talkie during the chase. After a long struggle, she sets him on fire by throwing moonshine on him along with a lit match, burning him alive. She picks up his sickle and finds Mike in the cabin. Ida emerges from the basement and stabs Mike with a knife, Sheryl quickly decapitates her with Deacon's sickle. She patches up Mike's wound and calls the Rangers Post with her cell phone, finally ending their sufferings.

One year has passed since Mike and Sheryl survived their ordeal. The couple put their baby to bed and leave the room. As the movie ends, the camera fades over to the window where Deacon's double blade sickle suddenly appears.

== Cast ==
- Josh Randall as Mike Warren
- Brianna Brown as Sheryl James
- Nick Searcy as Clyde Forester
- Beth Broderick as Ida Forester
- Sascha Rosemann as Deacon
- T.W. Leshner as Darryl
- Branden R. Morgan as Brody
- Ryan McGee as Lonnie
- Carl Bressler as Sam
- Debbie Jaffe as Evelyn
- Suzanna Urszuly as Sarah Travers
- Ryan Wiik as James Block

== Release ==
Timber Falls premiered on the Fantasy Filmfest in Germany on July 27, 2007 and was part of the Screamfest Film Festival in the US on October 20, 2007. The movie had limited screenings in the US, Russia, UK, and Turkey, but was released directly to DVD in other countries such as Finland and Iceland. In Brazil it was released with the title Wrong Turn 2. In Mexico it was released with the title Wrong Turn 3.

=== Home media ===
The film was released on DVD by Vivendi Entertainment on May 13, 2008. It was later released by Scanbox Entertainment on October 6, that same year.

== Reception ==
On Rotten Tomatoes, the film holds an approval rating of 38% based on 8 reviews, with a weighted average rating of 4.9/10. Philip French from The Guardian gave the film a negative review, writing, "a leering, bloody, sadistic affair made by people who understand the audience for this. Innocent moviegoers straying into this film at their local multiplex will be shouting out for deliverance or, in the case of the more sophisticated among them, for Deliverance." Steve Barton from Dread Central awarded the film a score of 3.5 out of 5, writing, "Timber Falls proves itself to be a cut above the paint-by-numbers crap we’re usually force fed and as a result ends up being a rarely had breath of fresh air. Even though said breath happened to have escaped from a blood-spurting severed jugular."
