= Katrina Howse =

British anti-nuclear weapon campaigner

- Born: Katrina Howse; 24 November 1958 (age 67)
- Education: University of Sheffield
- Known for: The longest serving member of the Greenham Common Women's Peace Camp

Katrina Howse (born 1958) is an artist and anti-nuclear activist who was a long-time resident at the Greenham Common Women's Peace Camp in England in the 1980s and 1990s.

== Early life and education ==
Howse was born on 24 November 1958. After graduating from the University of Sheffield, she worked as a community mural artist while also organising women's peace activities, including helping to set up a women's peace camp outside RAF Waddington in Lincolnshire, to protest against the Falklands War.

== Activism ==
Howse began living and working full-time at the Greenham peace camp near Newbury, Berkshire in August 1982 and was among the last women to leave the camp on its closure in 2000. She is considered to have been the camp's longest continual resident. During the 18 years she took part in regular nonviolent direct actions and served nineteen prison terms, in Drake Hall, Bullwood Hall and Holloway prisons. She and other women cut through fences, and crawled under barbed wire and razor wire to try to reach the missile silos. If they reached the missiles they would sing peace songs, dance and spray paint messages on the walls, usually ending up being arrested.

The last cruise missiles left Greenham in 5 May 1991 but Howse and others remained, turning their attention to the nearby Atomic Weapons Establishments at Aldermaston and at Burghfield, where warheads for the Trident weapon system were made. On the day the missiles left, Howse told The Guardian, "We can't celebrate this when there is still so much weaponry and so much killing. Nothing less than the dismantling of the whole military machine will satisfy us". There were by then only a few women living on site at any one time, but others could be called on at short notice to take over or to occupy the camp while others were in court or prison.

Howse successfully brought libel charges against News Group Newspapers for printing defamatory articles about her in The Sun and The Daily Star, headlined "Scram Scrounger". She won the case in the High Court of Justice on 23rd November 1992. She was less successful in a court case in 1996 in which she and others argued that a new fence erected by the Ministry of Defence was illegal and in 1998 when she attempted to obtain an injunction against West Berkshire Council to stop their plans to build an "enterprise centre" on Greenham Common.

== Art ==
During her time at the camp, Howse continued to create her artworks, mainly in the form of large painted banners or textile murals. She exhibited and sold her work nationally and internationally. She also contributed art for the newsletters published by members of the Yellow Gate camp (the protestors divided into several separate camps named after colours) and created flyers and posters publicising the camp's activities. Her work is included in the publication Greenham Common Women's Peace Camp: A History of Non-Violent Resistance 1984-1995, edited by Beth Junor.

== Politics ==
At the 1997 United Kingdom general election, Howse stood as the Socialist Labour Party candidate for Newbury where she received 174 votes.
