= Joseph Leon Blau =

American historian and philosopher

Joseph Leon Blau (May 6, 1909 – December 28, 1986) was an American scholar of Jewish history and philosophy.

== Biography ==
Blau was born in Brooklyn, New York City. He attended Columbia University, where he studied under Salo Wittmayer Baron. He earned his bachelor's degree in 1931, his master's in 1933, and his Ph.D. in 1944, all from Columbia. Blau taught at Columbia from 1944 to 1977 and was chair of its Department of Religion from 1968 to 1977.

Blau was one of the signers of A Secular Humanist Declaration in 1980. He was also one of the signers of the Humanist Manifesto. He was a foreign member of the British Academy.

He died in 1986 in Riverdale, New York.

== Writings ==
His notable writings include his PhD Christian Interpretation of the Cabala in the Renaissance (1944); Men and Movements in American Philosophy (1952); The Story of Jewish Philosophy (1962), The Jews of the United States, 1790–1840 (co-edited with Salo Baron, 1963), Modern Varieties of Judaism (1966), and Judaism in America (1976).
