= Paul Addison =

British historian (1943–2020)

- Portrait photograph
- Born: Paul Addison Wilson Walker; 3 May 1943; Whittington, Staffordshire, England, UK
- Died: 21 January 2020 (aged 76); Edinburgh, Scotland, UK
- Spouse: Rosy Sheehan (m. 1979)
- Children: 2

Academic background
- Education: University of Oxford
- Doctoral advisor: A.J.P. Taylor

Academic work
- Discipline: Political history
- Sub-discipline: 20th Century Britain and World War II
- Institutions: University of Edinburgh
- Notable students: Gordon Brown
- Notable works: The Road to 1945 (1975)

Paul Addison, FRSE (3 May 1943 – 21 January 2020) was a British historian known for his research on the political history of Britain during the Second World War and the post-war period. Addison was part of the first generation of academic historians to study the conflict. His most notable work The Road to 1945 (1975) traced the origins of the post-war consensus into the British wartime politics.

== Early life ==
Paul Addison Wilson Walker was born in Whittington, near Lichfield, in Staffordshire on 3 May 1943. His father was a Native American soldier in the United States Army who was posted in the country as part of the preparations for the "Second Front" during the Second World War. He had no contact with Addison after his birth. He was instead brought up by his mother, Pauline Wilson Walker, who served as a Land Girl during the conflict.

Addison attended the King Edward VI Grammar School in Lichfield and subsequently studied at the University of Oxford. He completed his undergraduate degree at Pembroke College before moving to Nuffield College as a postgraduate. Alongside his studies, he assisted Randolph Churchill in preparing the papers of the late premier Winston Churchill for publication alongside other research students Martin Gilbert (1936-2015) and Cameron Hazlehurst.

Along with his contemporary Angus Calder (1942–2008), Addison was among the first of a new generation of academic historians to examine the history of the Second World War critically without having personally experienced it. His doctoral studies addressed political opposition to the Churchill war ministry and was supervised by A.J.P. Taylor. Addison gained a D.Phil in 1971.

== The Road to 1945 ==
Addison's first book was The Road to 1945 which was published with Jonathan Cape in 1975. It has been described as "a landmark in the writing of contemporary history" in Britain. It followed the publication of Calder's influential The People's War (1969) but focused more narrowly on the causes of the landslide victory of the Labour Party in the 1945 general election. He wrote:

All three parties went to the polls in 1945 committed to principles of social and economic reconstruction which their leaders had endorsed as members of the Coalition. A massive new middle ground had emerged in politics. [...] When Labour swept to victory in 1945 the new consensus fell, like a branch of ripe plums, into the lap of Mr Attlee.

Addison's argument was that the "post-war consensus" reflected an ideological convergence which had occurred during the Second World War itself. He consisted that both Conservative and Labour parties had broadly converged on the need for a managed economy, limited nationalisation, and a welfare state in this period. The Road to 1945 was influential in framing the arguments in the political history of the Second World War in the United Kingdom.

== Later work ==
Addison lectured at Pembroke College, Oxford before moving to the University of Edinburgh in 1967. He remained at Edinburgh for most of his career. He published several further works on British politics during the wartime and post-war periods. These included two noted biographies of Winston Churchill, namely Churchill on the Home Front (1992) and Churchill: The Unexpected Hero (2005).

From 1996, he was director of the Centre for Second World War Studies in Edinburgh. He worked alongside Jeremy Crang on a series of works exploring "the key role of propaganda, information and the state’s monitoring of civilian morale during the war" as well as the Blitz. He retired in 2005 and became a fellow of the Royal Society of Edinburgh in 2006.

Addison's students at Edinburgh included the future prime minister Gordon Brown who provided a tribute at Addison's funeral. It has been argued that Addison's influence led to Brown's decision to raise the top rate of income tax about 40% during his premiership.

== Personal life and death ==
Addison married Rosy Sheehan in 1979, and they had two children. He died from lung cancer at the Royal Infirmary of Edinburgh on 21 January 2020, aged 76.

== Selected publications ==
- The Road to 1945, Jonathan Cape, 1975, ISBN 978-0-7126-5932-1
- Now the War is Over: A Social History of Britain, 1945-1951, Jonathan Cape, 1985, ISBN 978-0-224-02325-2
- Churchill on the Home Front, Jonathan Cape, 1992, ISBN 978-0-224-01428-1
- Time to Kill: The Soldier's Experience of War in the West 1939-1945, Paul Addison, Angus Calder ed., Pimlico, 1997, ISBN 0-7126-7376-8
- The Burning Blue: A New History of the Battle of Britain, Paul Addison, Jeremy Crang ed., Pimlico, 2000, ISBN 978-0-7126-6475-2
- Churchill: The Unexpected Hero, Oxford University Press, 2005, ISBN 978-0-19-927934-0
- Firestorm: The Bombing of Dresden, 1945, Pimlico, Paul Addison, Jeremy Crang ed., Pimlico, 2006, ISBN 978-1-84413-928-6
- A Companion to Contemporary Britain, 1939-2000, Paul Addison, Harriet Jones ed., Wiley-Blackwell, 2007, ISBN 978-1-4051-6730-7
- Winston Churchill, Oxford University Press, 2007, ISBN 978-0-19-921757-1
- No Turning Back: The Peacetime Revolutions of Post-War Britain, Oxford University Press, 2010, ISBN 978-0-19-219267-7

== Sources ==
- Morgan, Kenneth O. (2024). "Addison, Paul (1943–2020), historian". Oxford Dictionary of National Biography (online ed.). Oxford University Press. doi:10.1093/odnb/9780198614128.013.90000381737. (Subscription, Wikipedia Library access or UK public library membership required.)
- Crang, Jeremy (4 March 2020). "Paul Addison obituary". The Guardian.
- Wood, Ian S. (12 February 2020). "Paul Addison, internationally-noted historian and biographer of Winston Churchill". The Scotsman.
- "Paul Addison obituary". The Times. 23 March 2020.
