= Beth Junor =

British speech therapist and anti-nuclear activist (born 1958)

- Born: Elizabeth Junor; 28 July 1958 (age 68); Lanark, Scotland
- Education: University of St Andrews; Queen Margaret College
- Occupations: Speech and language therapist for autistic children; art gallery owner
- Known for: Member of the Greenham Common Women's Peace Camp and author of a book on the camp

Elizabeth (Beth) Junor is a Scottish language therapist, poet, art gallery owner and activist. She was a member of the Greenham Common Women's Peace Camp in the 1980s, which protested against American nuclear-armed cruise missiles being sited in Britain and wrote a book about the camp.

== Early life ==
Junor was born on 28 July 1958 in Lanark, Scotland. She obtained an MA in fine art from the University of St Andrews and a master's in speech and language pathology and therapy from Queen Margaret College in Edinburgh.

== Career ==
Junor worked for 27 years as a speech and language therapist. From 2005 she was based in Hackney, London, where she specialised in childhood autism spectrum disorders. During this time, she translated from the French Peter Vermeulin's I Am Special: A Workbook to Help Children, Teens and Adults with Autism Spectrum Disorders to Understand their Diagnosis, Gain Confidence and Thrive. Junor took early retirement in 2017 to return to St Andrews, where she opened an art gallery specialising in contemporary Scottish and European art. Forced to close the gallery in 2020 because of the COVID-19 pandemic, she continued to operate it online.

== Activism ==
Actively involved in the peace movement in Scotland, Junor first paid brief visits to Greenham Common Women's Peace Camp outside RAF Greenham Common near Newbury, Berkshire in England in 1983, while continuing to work. In August 1986 she moved full-time to the camp, staying there until February 1990. The camp had split into several locations close to different gates of the base, reflecting the various political ideologies of the women protestors. She based herself at the original camp, known as the "Yellow Gate", situated just outside the main gate of the base, and contributed to the running of the camp. She carried out numerous nonviolent direct actions. On 19 June 1987 she was one of six women to remove 16 sections of fence from the north side of the base in broad daylight. She produced Yellow Gate camp newsletters, which communicated updates from the camp to supporters and the wider peace movement, and wrote a handbook on non-violence. She was arrested and charged on many occasions and, in common with most other women at the camp, represented herself in court. She was imprisoned seven times.

After leaving in 1990 she remained closely involved with the camp until its closure in 2000. She published Greenham Common Women's Peace Camp: A History of Non-Violent Resistance 1984-1995, with illustrations by Katrina Howse. After the book was published, she was quoted as saying: "After years of being observed from an almost anthropological viewpoint, of being examined by academia and misrepresented by the media, at last we've been able to tell our own story and project our own image of ourselves". She co-wrote with Howse a guide on how peace camp members could take libel action against the media, which often misrepresented the camp participants. Junor was also one of the camp members who played a major role in the establishment of a permanent memorial to the camp at Greenham Common. She has had long-term involvement in various social justice organisations, including Scotland Against Criminalising Communities, a voluntary organisation that campaigns against Britain's laws that criminalise political activity.

== Publications ==
Junor is a member of Scottish PEN International, a member of the Society of Authors, which represents professional writers, illustrators, and literary translators, and a member of the Edinburgh Playwrights Workshop. Her publications include:

- Scarcely Ever Out of My Thoughts: The Letters of Valda Trevlyn Grieve to Christopher Murray Grieve (2007). Grieve was best known by his pen name, Hugh MacDiarmid, a Scottish poet, journalist, Scottish nationalist and communist. Valda Trevlyn was his second wife.
- The Souls Of The Dead Are Taking The Best Seats: 50 World Poets on War (2004 - anthology edited with Angus Calder).
- A Full Moon Cycle (2001). A book of poems.
- Greenham Common Women's Peace Camp: A History of Non-Violent Resistance 1984-1995 (1995 - with illustrations by Katrina Howse).

Her play Hunger was shown at the 1993 Edinburgh Festival Fringe.
