= Angus Calder =

Scottish writer and historian (1942–2008)

The Honourable Angus Calder
- Calder pictured c. 2005
- Born: Angus Lindsay Ritchie Calder; 5 February 1942; London, England
- Died: 5 June 2008 (aged 66); Edinburgh, Scotland
- Education: King's College, Cambridge; University of Sussex
- Occupation: Academic
- Parent(s): Peter Ritchie Calder; Mabel Jane Forbes McKail
- Relatives: Nigel Calder (brother); Simon Calder (nephew)

Angus Lindsay Ritchie Calder (5 February 1942 – 5 June 2008) was a Scottish writer, historian, and poet. Initially studying English literature, he became interested in political history and wrote a landmark study on Britain during the Second World War in 1969 entitled The People's War. He subsequently wrote several other historical works but turned to literature and poetry and worked primarily as a writer, though often holding a number of university teaching positions. A socialist and Scottish nationalist, he was a prominent Scottish public intellectual during the 1970s and 1980s.

== Early life ==
Angus Calder was born in London on 5 February 1942 into a prominent left-wing family from Scotland. His father was Ritchie Calder (1906–1982), a noted socialist and pacifist who became famous for his work as a journalist and science writer. His siblings are Nigel Calder, mathematician Allan Calder, educationist Isla Calder (1946–2000) and teacher Fiona Rudd (née Calder). His nephew is travel writer and journalist Simon Calder.

Calder attended Wallington County Grammar School and King's College, Cambridge, where he read English Literature. He gained a doctorate from the University of Sussex in 1968 on politics in the United Kingdom during World War II, entitled "The Common Wealth Party, 1942–45" which studied the political party of the same name. At the time, academic research into the conflict was rare as government papers were not available under the fifty-year rule. As a result, Calder worked closely with Paul Addison, another historian with similar research interests. Together Addison and Calder made extensive use of the newly discovered archives of Mass-Observation to examine British public opinion. Calder was instrumental in creating the Mass-Observation Archive at Sussex in 1970, in collaboration with Asa Briggs.

== The People's War ==
Calder had been commissioned to write a general history of the British Home Front by the publisher Jonathan Cape while still working on his PhD thesis. This led to The People's War, first published in 1969. The work was academic in tone and ranged widely across the political and social history of the period. It was critical of enduring propaganda myths without being polemic, and was extremely successful. It has subsequently been described as "groundbreaking". As Addison summarised:

In order to wage the war, Angus argued, the prewar ruling class had been compelled to mobilize the people. During the first half of the war they had effectively displaced their former rulers and taken charge of the war themselves. It became the People's War, a 'ferment of participatory democracy', exemplified by the way in which Londoners, acting in defiance of the government, had turned underground tube stations into deep shelters. During the second half of the war, however, the 'forces of wealth, bureaucracy and privilege' began to regroup and recover the authority they had lost.

The People's War was well received and won the John Llewellyn Rhys Prize, a literary award. Though its thesis was not widely adopted in academia, it proved extremely influential as popular history. Richard Eyre said that he "could name about twenty works, films, television and theatre which have emerged essentially from Angus Calder's book". Among those who were said to have been influenced by the work were the playwright David Hare and future prime minister Gordon Brown. It remains in print.

Calder increasingly began to doubt his own thesis over the following decades. Many of his original conclusions were revised in his The Myth of the Blitz (1991). According to Addison, this reassessment was encouraged by Calder's revulsion with the jingoistic nationalism which accompanied the Falklands War of 1982 and Thatcherism. Both were partly inspired by the collective memory of the "People's War" which Calder had himself popularised.

== Literature and poetry ==
Following his success with The People's War, Calder increasingly returned to his interests in literature and poetry. In 1971, he moved to Edinburgh where he published Russia Discovered, a survey of 19th-century Russian fiction in 1976, and, three years later, became staff tutor in arts with the Open University. He subsequently taught all over the world, lecturing in literature at several African universities and serving from 1981 to 1987 as co-editor of the Journal of Commonwealth Literature.

Calder became a ubiquitous figure on the Scottish literary scene writing essays and articles, books on Byron and T. S. Eliot, and working as editor of collections of poetry and prose. He also wrote introductions to new publications of such diverse works as Great Expectations, Walter Scott's Old Mortality, T. E. Lawrence's Seven Pillars of Wisdom, Evelyn Waugh's Sword of Honour trilogy and James Boswell's The Life of Samuel Johnson. In 1981 he published Revolutionary Empire (1981), a study of three centuries of imperial development by English speakers to the end of the 18th century. Revolving Culture: Notes from the Scottish Republic is a collection of essays on Scottish topics which expressed itself through the writings of such figures as Robert Burns and Scott and in gestures of realpolitik such as the repression of "Jacobins" during the French Revolution. In 1984 Calder helped to set up the Scottish Poetry Library in Edinburgh and served as its first convener. He also worked as an editor of Hugh MacDiarmid's prose. Calder won the Eric Gregory Award for his poetry.

== Politics ==
A nationalist and socialist, he moved from the Scottish National Party (SNP) to the Scottish Socialist Party, and though he cherished the Scottish republican spirit, he sought to challenge some of the popular myths surrounding the country's sense of national identity. In Revolving Culture: Notes from a Scottish republic (1992) he described the development, during the early stages of the Union with England, of an "intellectual republic" forged by a combination of insularity and lack of English interest in Scottish affairs. In 1997 he edited Time to Kill – the Soldier's Experience of War in the West 1939–1945 with Paul Addison; Scotlands of the Mind (2002); Disasters and Heroes: On War, Memory and Representation (2004); and Gods, Mongrels and Demons: 101 Brief but Essential Lives (2004), a collection of potted biographies of "creatures who have extended my sense of the potentialities, both comic and tragic, of human nature". He had always published verse and won a Gregory Award for his poetry in 1967. Questions of Scottish national identity assumed growing importance in the 1980s, and Calder became active in the debate. A distinctive "Scottish social ethos" informed the activities of prominent Scots in the years of Empire, when they had invested heavily in the concept of Britishness, although he reportedly felt that the Scots had meddled much more overweeningly with the English sense of identity than the English ever did with the Scots. He was delighted to discover that the game of cricket had been introduced to Sri Lanka by a Scot.

== Personal life ==
His first wife was Jennifer Daiches, daughter of Scottish literary critic David Daiches, with whom Calder collaborated on a book about Sir Walter Scott in 1969. The Calders had two daughters, Rachel and Gowan, and a son, Gideon. His first marriage ended in 1982; he married Kate Kyle in 1986, with whom he had a son, Douglas, born in 1989. Calder took early retirement from the Open University in 1995.

== Death ==
Calder died from lung cancer on 5 June 2008, aged 66. In the closing weeks of his life, the poet Richard Berengarten, together with his son Gideon Calder edited a collection of writing and sketches for and about him, which appeared just after his death.

== Selected bibliography ==
=== History and literary criticism ===
- The People's War: Britain, 1939–45. London: Jonathan Cape, 1969.
- Scott, with Jenni Calder. London: Evans, 1969.
- Russia Discovered: Nineteenth Century Fiction from Pushkin to Chekhov. London: Heinemann, 1976.
- Revolutionary Empire: The Rise of the English-Speaking Empires from the Fifteenth Century to the 1780s. London: Jonathan Cape, 1981.
- T. S. Eliot. Brighton: Harvester, 1987.
- Byron. Buckingham: Open University Press, 1987.
- The Myth of the Blitz. London: Jonathan Cape, 1991.
- Revolving Culture. London: I.B. Tauris, 1994.
- Scotlands of the Mind. Edinburgh: Luath Press, 2002.
- Disasters and Heroes: On War, Memory and Representation. Cardiff: University of Wales Press, 2004.
- Gods, Mongrels and Demons: 101 Brief but Essential Lives. London: Bloomsbury, 2004.

=== Poetry ===
- Waking in Waikato. Edinburgh: diehard, 1997.
- Horace in Tollcross: Eftir some odes of Q. H. Flaccus. Newtyle: Kettilonia, 2000.
- Colours of Grief. Nottingham: Shoestring, 2002.
- Dipa's Bowl. London: Aark Arts, 2004.
- Sun Behind the Castle: Edinburgh Poems. Edinburgh: Luath Press, 2004.

=== Edited collections: poetry and prose ===
- Britain at War, 1942. London: Jonathan Cape, 1973.
- (with Andrew Gurr) Writers in East Africa. Nairobi: East African Literature Bureau, 1974.
- (with Jack Mapanje and Cosmo Pieterse). Summer Fires: New Poetry of Africa. London: Heinemann, 1983.
- (with Gabriele Bok) Englische Lyrik 1900–1980. Leipzig: Reclam, 1983.
- (with Dorothy Sheridan) Speak for Yourself: A Mass Observation Anthology. London: Jonathan Cape, 1984.
- Byron and Scotland: Radical or Dandy?, Edinburgh University Press, 1989, ISBN 9780852246511.
- (with William Donnelly) Selected Poetry by Robert Burns. Harmondsworth: Penguin, 1991.
- (with John M. Mackenzie and Jeanne Cannizzo) David Livingstone and the Victorian Encounter with Africa. London: National Portrait Gallery, 1996.
- (with Paul Addison) Time to Kill: The Soldier's Experience of War in the West, 1939–45. London: Pimlico, 1997.
- (with Glen Murray and Alan Riach) The Rauchle Tongue: Selected Essays, Journalism and Interviews by Hugh MacDiarmid (3 vols). Manchester: Carcanet, 1997–98.
- Wars. Harmondsworth: Penguin, 1999.
- Selected Poems by Louis Stevenson. Harmondsworth: Penguin, 1999.
- (with Beth Junor) The Souls of the Dead are Taking the Best Seats: 50 World Poets on War. Edinburgh: Luath Press, Edinburgh, 2005.

=== Introductions ===
- Great Expectations by Charles Dickens. Harmondsworth: Penguin, 1965.
- Faces at the Crossroads ed. Chris Wanjala. Nairobi: East African Literature Bureau, 1971.
- Old Mortality by Walter Scott. Harmondsworth: Penguin, 1975.
- The Seven Pillars of Wisdom by T. E. Lawrence. Ware: Wordsworth, 1999.
- The Life of Samuel Johnson by James Boswell. Ware: Wordsworth, 1999.
- Sword of Honour by Evelyn Waugh. Harmondsworth: Penguin, 2001.
- The Devil's Dictionary by Ambrose Bierce, illustrated by Ralph Steadman. London: Bloomsbury, 2003.
- The Thrie Estaitis by David Lindsay, ed. Alan Spence. Edinburgh: Edinburgh University Press, 2003.
- Sugar-Coated Pill: Selected Poems by Mahmood Jamal. Edinburgh: Word Power, 2007.

== Reviews ==
- Lenman, Bruce (1982), review of Revolutionary Empire: The Rise of the English-Speaking Empires from the 15th Century to the 1780s, in Cencrastus No. 8, Spring 1982, p. 37, ISSN 0264-0856

== Anthologies ==
- (Contributor) Pax Edina: The One O' Clock Gun Anthology (Edinburgh, 2010)

Recorded readings and performances

- (Collaboration) From Dungeons to the Sky – Commissioned by Amnesty International (Scotland) for performance of 12 poems with music for Commonwealth Head of States visit to Edinburgh, 1996, at the Queen's Hall, Edinburgh. Readings by Angus and Gowan Calder, piano compositions and performance by Dmytro Morykit.

== Sources ==
- Addison, Paul (2010). "Angus Calder (1942-2008)". History Workshop Journal. 70 (70): 299–304. doi:10.1093/hwj/dbq037. JSTOR 40981179.
- Crick, Bernard (10 June 2008). "Angus Calder". The Guardian.
- Cameron, Sue (20 June 2008). "Historian who debunked second world war's myths". Financial Times.
- "Calder, Angus Lindsay Ritchie". Oxford Dictionary of National Biography (online ed.). Oxford University Press. doi:10.1093/ref:odnb/99794. (Subscription, Wikipedia Library access or UK public library membership required.)
