= ...from Hell =

- Narrated by: Andrew Sachs; Ross Kemp; Fiona Foster; Hugo Speer; Stephen Tompkinson; Richard Armitage; Julian Rhind-Tutt; Stephen Mangan; Dennis Waterman
- Country of origin: United Kingdom
- Original language: English
- No. of episodes: 37

Production
- Producers: ITV Studios, September Films
- Running time: 60 mins

Original release
- Network: ITV
- Release: 14 July 1997 – July 2010

...from Hell is a one-hour ITV disasters-based documentary shown in the United Kingdom on a semi-regular basis. It discusses and shows real-life footage of the experiences that people (mainly the British public) have witnessed on the subject of programme. For example, Weddings from Hell.

The programme began on 14 July 1997 initially with Neighbours from Hell. This was originally a one-off documentary to compete against the BBC with their current boom of docusoaps including Airport and The Cruise. This was soon followed up with the popular Holidays from Hell. The two aforementioned programmes are the most well known of the series.

The documentary was originally best noted for its dramatic 'flame-filled' title sequence, indicating a situation that could have originated literally 'from hell'.

It was narrated mainly by ex-Fawlty Towers actor, Andrew Sachs although others have included Ross Kemp and Fiona Foster.

In total, 37 episodes were produced.

The disasters-based documentary finally ceased operations for good in July 2010.

== Versions ==
- Builders from Hell
- Christmases from Hell
- Cruises from Hell
- Dentists from Hell
- Diets from Hell
- Drivers from Hell
- Extensions from Hell starring the Shannons
- Facelifts from Hell
- Filthy Homes from Hell
- Flights from Hell
- Garages from Hell
- Gardeners from Hell
- Holidays from Hell
- Holiday Homes from Hell
- Homes from Hell
- Honeymoons from Hell
- Hotels from Hell
- In-Laws from Hell
- Jobs from Hell
- Journeys from Hell
- Makeovers from Hell
- Nannies from Hell
- Neighbourhoods from Hell
- Neighbours from Hell
- New Homes from Hell
- Nights from Hell
- Restaurants from Hell
- Roads from Hell
- Salesmen from Hell
- Staff from Hell
- Teenagers from Hell
- Tenants from Hell
- Tourists from Hell
- Tradesmen from Hell
- Traffic Jams from Hell
- Weather from Hell
- Weddings from Hell

== Transmissions ==
These programmes first aired on ITV Network and some are often broadcast each year. They are occasionally repeated on ITV2. American versions of the show were shown on The Learning Channel in 2001 and 2002.
