= Rajan Datar =

British journalist and broadcaster

Rajan Datar is a British journalist and broadcaster. He presents Over to You on the BBC World Service and the Travel Show on BBC News (international TV channel). He is also a ska musician.

== Education ==
Datar was born in southwest London. Datar attended Hampton Grammar School in the city.

Datar attended the University of Oxford for his university undergraduate education, where he studied Philosophy, Politics and Economics. He then completed a Masters degree in Political Sociology at the London School of Economics and Political Science.

== Broadcasting career ==
Datar started working at the BBC as a trainee radio journalist following his university education. He then trained in production/directing in television at the corporation.

In the early 1990s, Datar presented Rough Guide to the World on BBC Two. He also reported for BBC Radio 1's Newsbeat in the mid-1990s. In 1994, he presented The People's Parliament on Channel 4and he reported for Newsnight in 1996 and 1997.

As of 2001, Datar presented The Money Programme on BBC Two. As of 2005, he remained a presenter of the programme. In 2010, he reported for How to Beat Tough Times: Money Watch on BBC Two.

As of 2022, Datar also presented The Forum on the BBC World Service. Until 2024, Datar co-presented with Sally Gray MBE PresenterPod, a programme offering advice and information to aspiring and current television and radio presenters. From at least 2009 to the present, he has presented Over to You, the BBC World Service programme allowing listeners to share their feedback about the station's programmes. He has presented the Travel Show on BBC News; he also presented the programme's predecessor, fast:track. In 2012, Datar was named the Broadcast Travel Journalist of the Year 2012 at the Business Travel Awards. By 2015, Datar had visited more than 50 countries for fast:track and the Travel Show.

In 2023, Datar MCd the closing and opening sessions at the Global Leaders Summit presented by the World Tourism Association for Culture and Heritage. He is a regular moderator for major organisations' conferences.

Datar contributed to Saturday Review on BBC Radio 4, prior to the programme stopping being broadcast. Datar also presented The Strand, an arts programme on the BBC World Service which stopped being broadcast in 2013.

== Music career ==
In the 1980s, Datar and his friend, the musician Deuan German, co-founded in London Maroon Town, a ska band. Their music was featured on John Peel's BBC Radio 1 programme. As of mid-2025, the band continues to play music. The events they have played at include WemsFest 2025.
