= Simon Calder =

English travel journalist

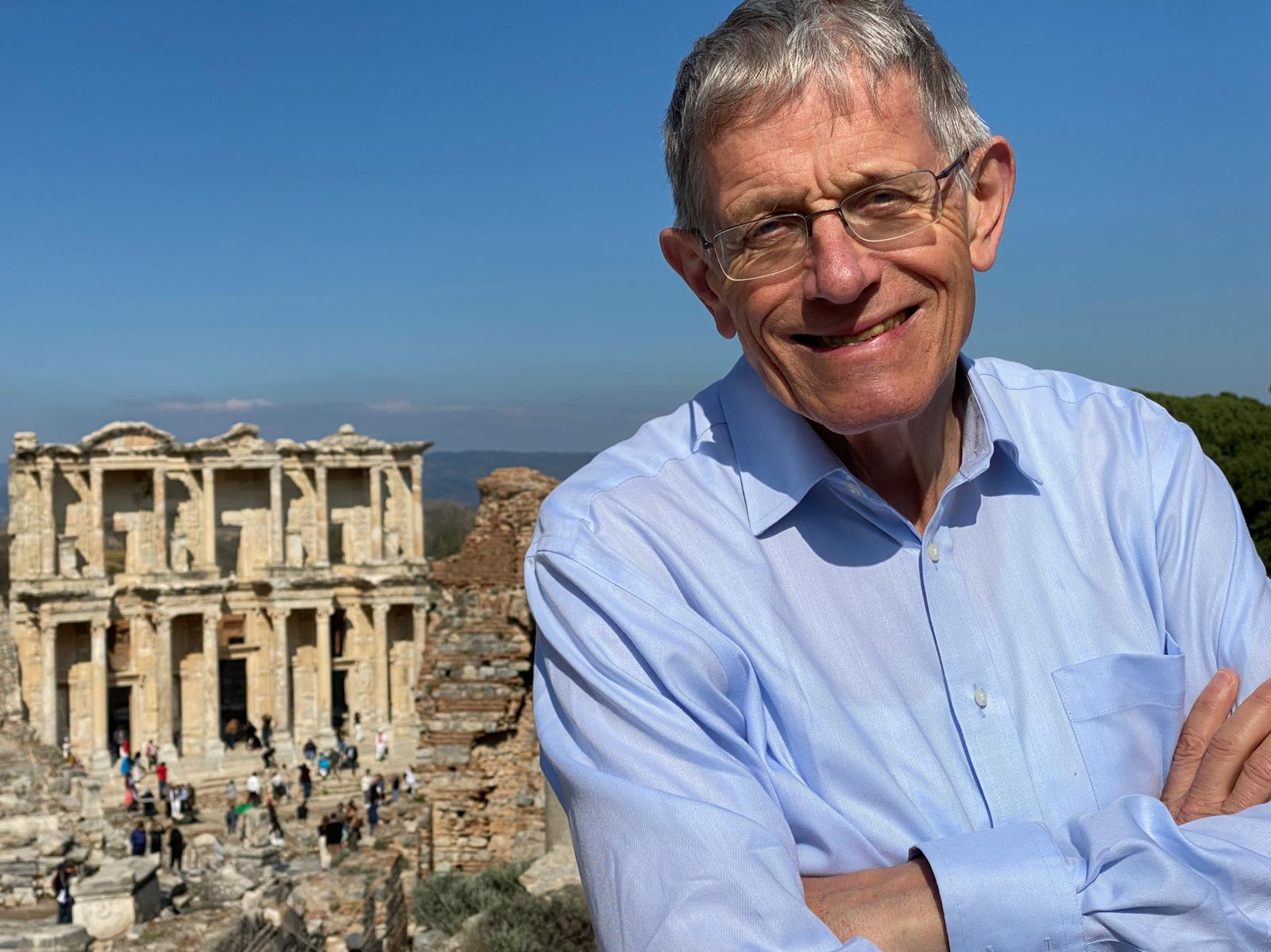
- Calder in Turkey in 2023
- Born: Simon Peter Ritchie Calder; 25 December 1955 (age 70); Crawley, West Sussex, England
- Education: Thomas Bennett Community College; University of Warwick
- Occupation: Travel journalist
- Children: 2
- Parent: Nigel Calder
- Relatives: Peter Ritchie Calder (grandfather); Angus Calder (uncle)
- Website: Homepage

Simon Peter Ritchie Calder (born 25 December 1955) is a freelance British travel journalist and broadcaster. He works for various news and travel publications. He is known as "The man who pays his way" due to his policy of not accepting free transport or accommodation from the travel trade. He was formerly the travel correspondent for The Independent and is currently the travel correspondent for The Daily Telegraph, where he hosts a weekly podcast, The Travel Expert.

== Biography ==
In 1962, Calder joined the Woodcraft Folk and travelled with the group to the Lake District. That same year, after the USSR sent nuclear warheads to Cuba, Calder's parents decided that with Gatwick Airport only two miles away they were in the line of a potential Soviet target. He attended Thomas Bennett School in Crawley.

Calder's first job was a cleaner for British Airways at Gatwick and later as a security guard. He began writing budget travel guidebooks during this period, starting with the Hitch-hiker's Manual: Britain. He later studied for a degree in mathematics at the University of Warwick.

After university, Calder briefly taught mathematics in Crawley before getting a job as a radio engineer with the BBC in London. Calder wrote several books and series of guides including the Traveller's Survival Kit series and Backpacks, Boots and Baguettes. His first broadcast as a travel expert was on Simon Bates' programme Studio B15 on BBC Radio 1 in 1980.

Calder became travel correspondent for The Independent in 1994 and shortly afterwards began presenting for BBC 2's Travel Show alongside Penny Junor until the programme ended in 1999. He then contributed to several BBC 1 shows, including Perfect Holiday and Departure Lounge. Calder presented the final film in the last edition of the long-running Holiday programme in 2007.

At The Independent Calder introduced his slogan "The man who pays his way", reflecting his unwillingness to accept gifts from the travel industry. He has continued to use this slogan throughout his career, including in his current role at The Daily Telegraph.

Calder's articles have featured in many publications including Condé Nast Traveller, The Evening Standard, National Geographic, High Life (BA's inflight magazine), Wanderlust Magazine, and the trade publication Travel Trade Gazette.

He continues to contribute to various BBC programmes, including Morning Live, as the 'Global Guru' on BBC News' The Travel Show and on Rip Off Britain. He regularly comments as an expert on travel issues for other TV stations, including CNN, Sky News, Good Morning Britain, ITV's This Morning, and radio stations such as LBC, and BBC Radio 2 and Radio 4.

In June 2026, Calder became the travel correspondent for The Daily Telegraph, where he presents The Travel Expert podcast.

== Family ==
Calder is the son of science writer Nigel Calder and the grandson of Lord Ritchie-Calder. He is the nephew of the Scottish writer and critic Angus Calder and educationalist Isla Calder (1946–2000).

== Travel ==
Calder flew on Concorde in 1986. In 2006, he travelled more than 5700 miles by rail across Russia from Moscow in the west to Vladivostok in the east, on the Trans-Siberian Railway.

Calder has travelled to more than 120 countries and lists Northern Ireland, Yorkshire and Hadrian's Wall in Northumberland among his favourite places to visit.

== Books ==
- Hitch-hiker's Manual: Britain. Vacation Work Publications. 1985. ISBN 978-0907638261.
- Griffith, Susan; Calder, Simon, eds. (1997). U. S. A. and Canada Travellers Survival Kit. Vacation Work Publications. ISBN 978-1854580894.
- Hatchwell, Emily; Calder, Simon (1999). Cuba in Focus: a guide to the people, politics and culture (second ed.). Latin America Bureau. ISBN 978-1899365265.
- Webb, Mick; Calder, Simon (2004). Backpacks, Boots and Baguettes: Walking on the Pyrenees. Virgin Books. ISBN 978-0753509029.
- No Frills: The truth behind the low-cost revolution in the skies. Virgin Books. 2008. ISBN 978-0753510445.
- 48 Hours in... European Capitals: How to enjoy the perfect short break in 20 great cities. Independent Print Limited. 2015. ISBN 978-1633533776.

== Awards ==
Calder won the 2011 Christmas edition of Celebrity Mastermind, with Concorde as his specialist subject.
