= Paul Beattie =

American artist

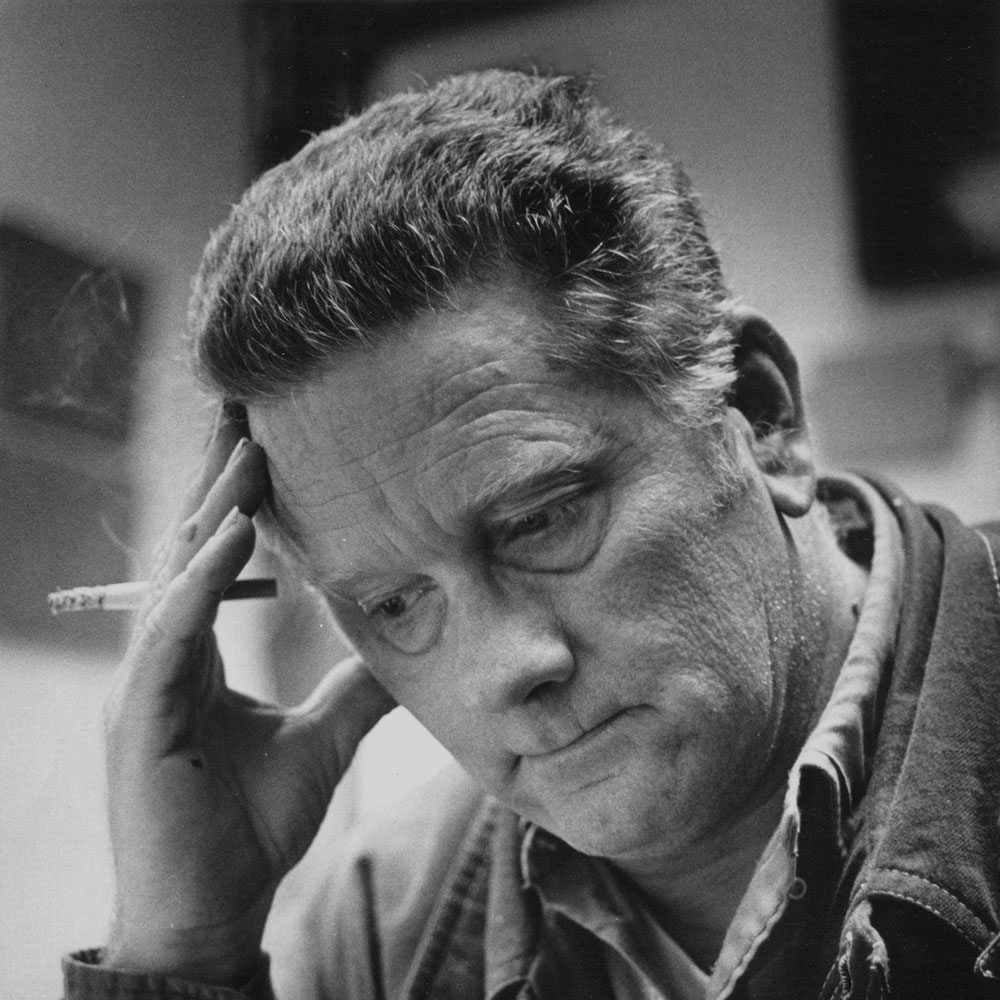
- Paul Beattie
- Born: 22 December 1924; Bay City, Michigan, U.S.
- Died: 20 June 1988 (aged 63); Sonoma County, California, U.S.
- Education: Detroit Society of Arts and Crafts (now the College for Creative Studies), Sonoma State University, University of California, Berkeley
- Known for: Painting, collage, film, drawing
- Movement: Beat Generation

Paul Beattie (1924–1988) was an American artist. He was part of the New York art scene in the late 1940s through the early 1950s, and also participated as an artist, light show innovator, and filmmaker in the early West Coast Beat movement during the 1950s and 1960s. He continued to produce and show his work in northern California for several decades until his death in 1988.

== Early life ==
Beattie was born in Bay City, Michigan. As a teenager he was enthralled by learning to draw, often sketching comic book panels, wildlife, and cowboy-showdown scenes. After a brief stint in the US Naval Reserve, from 1945 to 1947 he attended the Detroit Society of Arts and Crafts, where he was influenced by the works of the Impressionists, the Fauves, and the German Expressionists.

Soon after, Beattie moved to New York City, where he painted and showed his work. In this new environment, he immersed himself in the American Abstract Expressionist art scene, won awards, and achieved some note as a young painter. He later moved to California’s Bay Area, where he became a productive member of the beat revolution and was regarded for his collaborative and multidisciplinary work.

== Career ==
=== Early period: New York, 1947–1954 ===
Beattie moved to Greenwich Village in New York City in 1947, where he immersed himself in the post-war modern art movement. He was influenced by the works of Franz Kline, Willem de Kooning, Jackson Pollock, and Hans Hofmann; he strove to impart a “deep-space” quality to what he called a “Pollockian surface-patterned tracery” in his paintings.

In 1948, Beattie received an award in an international art competition sponsored by the Philip Rosenthal-Brooklyn Museum Art School and RoKo Gallery. He also exhibited at the Jacques Seligmann Galleries in 1949, and participated in a group show titled Fourteen Under Thirty-six: An Exhibition of Paintings at the Studio 35 gallery along with Elaine de Kooning, Grace Hartigan, Harry Jackson, Al Leslie and others in 1950.

Beattie’s New York career culminated in a one-man show at Hansa Gallery in 1954.

=== Middle period: San Francisco Bay Area, 1954–1963 ===
Despite early artistic success, Beattie left the New York art scene and in 1954, he moved his family to San Francisco, where he became a journeyman carpenter and continued to make art.

As part of the San Francisco Bay area Beat revolution, Beattie explored other art forms in addition to drawing and painting. Working in San Francisco, Sausalito, Larkspur, and Berkeley, he socialized and collaborated in various mediums with George Herms, Arthur Richer, Wallace Berman, Larry and Patti Jordan, Bill Spencer, Warner Jepson, ruth weiss, and Jay DeFeo.

During this period, Beattie experimented with collage, making constructions, press works and the written word, light shows, photography, and film-making.

Over the next decade, about a dozen of his art films were distributed by the New York Filmmakers Cooperative and Canyon Cinema in California, and screened throughout the United States and Europe. Beattie also exhibited his art in several Beat era San Francisco galleries, including the East and West Gallery and The "6" Gallery in 1955,; the New Mission in 1962; and the Batman Gallery in 1963 and 1964.

=== Maturity: Sonoma County, 1963–1980 ===
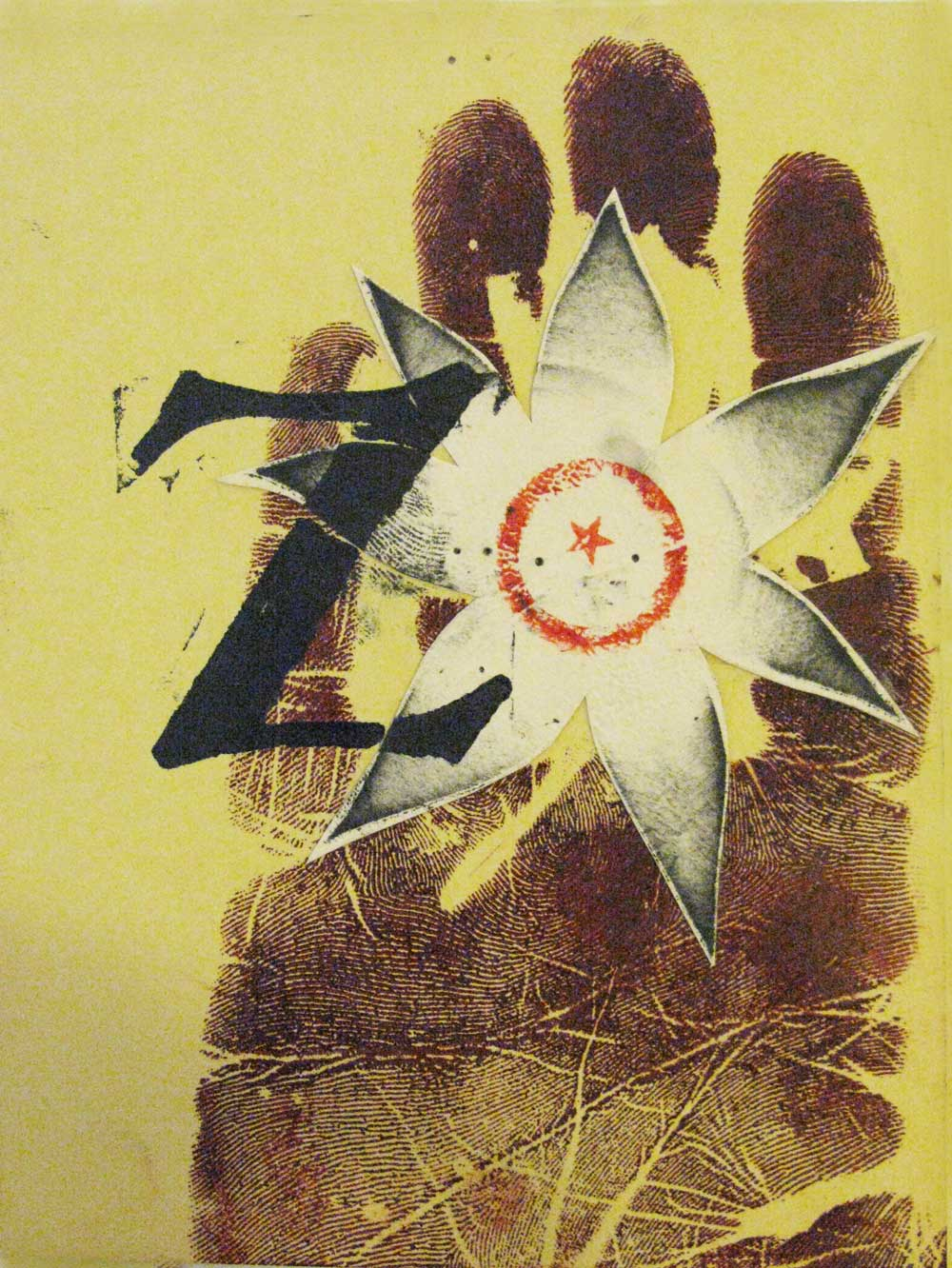
Hand with Z, early 1960s, M-C Press

After ten years in the San Francisco Bay Area, Beattie desired a more serene working environment. In late 1963, the Beattie family moved to Sonoma County. He continued to expand upon his earlier work in drawing and painting, endeavoring to define himself as something beyond an "Abstract Expressionist."

During this period, Beattie again collaborated with fellow Beat artists Arthur Richer and George Herms, making films and creating “Dadaesque” combinations of poetry and graphics that were printed on a small hand letterpress, and distributed under the M-C Press label.

For the next two decades, Beattie continued to exhibit in San Francisco and Los Angeles, while he worked on receiving his M.A. in Studio Art (University of California, Berkeley, 1976). Beattie also taught landscape composition and watercolor painting for six years at Santa Rosa Junior College (1974-1980).

In 1975, Beattie was invited to be part of the exhibition Collage and Assemblage in Southern California at the Los Angeles Institute of Contemporary Art (LICA). He also exhibited works several times at the San Francisco Museum of Modern Art (SFMOMA), starting in 1976 as a part of a show titled Painting and Sculpture in California: The Modern Era. In 1980, Beattie had a large solo show, Paul Beattie: Paintings and Drawings, and then eventually was also part of SFMOMA’s The 50th Anniversary exhibition (1984–1985)

=== Late period: 1980–1988 ===
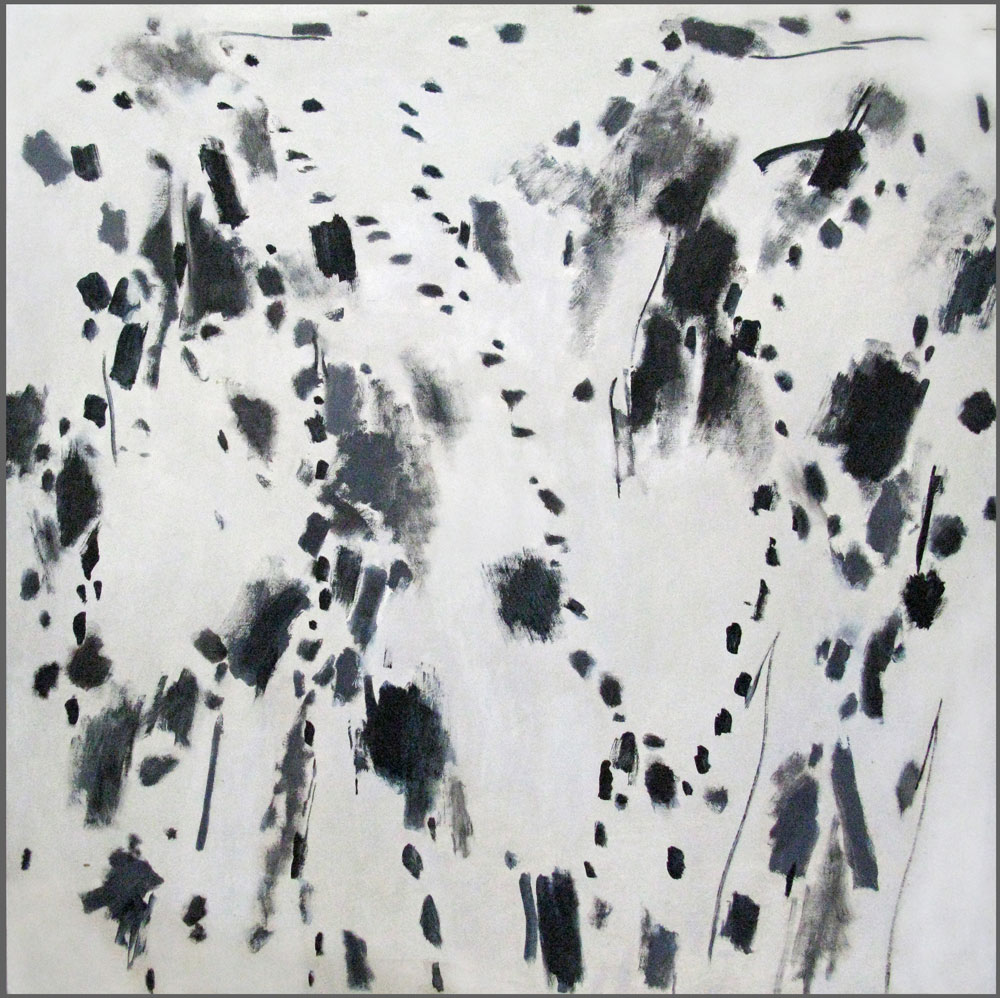
Structured Space, 1984, Acrylic on Masonite

By the 1980s, Beattie began to see himself less as an “abstract expressionist” and more as an “abstract realist.” He continued to search for imagery which would lend itself to his preference for open brushwork, the sketch-like qualities in drawing, and the use of color to create structure. This eventually led him toward the use of cloud- and sky-oriented subjects. This form evolved from landscapes and horizon lines into “atmospheric decks” and their extensions. This helped to satisfy his interest in “bringing together the qualities of a completely abstract painting experience and of a literal (bordering on photographic) verisimilitude.”

Thomas Albright, critic for the San Francisco Chronicle, wrote in 1980 that Paul Beattie’s paintings “…explore cosmological phenomena, but they simultaneously focus more intently on the various points at which these phenomena intersect with art-historical elements. Thus there are stains and patches of irregularly daubed and dappled color that suggest not only clouds and nebulas but the amorphous Impressionist surfaces of late Monet...there are lines and rods of color that imply not only the kinetic movement of magnetic fields, but the fractured geometry of early Mondrian."

== Personal life ==
After his first marriage to Elaine Dickinson ended, Beattie met and married Dee Dunstan in New York in 1952. They lived in a cold-water loft in the Bowery in NY, where Beattie drove a taxi and cooked in a restaurant to make ends meet, while pursuing his art career. In 1954, they moved from New York to San Francisco with their young family. In 1963, the Beattie family moved northward to Sonoma County, California, to find a natural approach to living by raising chickens, goats, vegetables, fruit, as well as their five children.

Over the next few decades Beattie and his wife studied astronomy, cosmology, and particle physics. After a brief illness, Beattie died at the age of 63 on June 20, 1988.

== Legacy ==
The California Museum of Art at the Luther Burbank Center in Santa Rosa honored Beattie by presenting a retrospective exhibition of his work six months after his death. Fellow artist and guest curator Raymond Barnhart stated, “This show…is but a sampling of an enormous body of work of a man lost to us in the midst of an unbelievably productive career; a man who has a long record of superior production, a style and subject matter of his own and a great diversity of media. Beattie is a genius…whose work is just waiting to be discovered on a national basis.”

At the time of his death, Beattie was working on a series of 340 large graphite drawings of individual terra-formed planets. Inspired by a 1985 visit to the Guggenheim Museum in New York, Beattie researched the project, scaling the size and spacing of the drawings to fill the Guggenheim's rotunda stairway. Each graphite planet manifests Beattie’s endeavor to reconcile the abstract with a sense of reality. The “Large Graphite Planet Series” remains intact as a testament to Paul Beattie’s dedication, perseverance, and faith in his artistic vision.

=== Works in permanent collections ===
Beattie has artworks in the permanent collections of the SFMOMA, the Doyle Collection at the Santa Rosa Junior College, and the San Jose Museum of Art. He also has pieces in the collections of the Laguna Art Museum, and at San Francisco’s SOMAR Gallery.
