= Tiline, Kentucky =

Unincorporated community in Kentucky, United States

- Unincorporated community
- Location in Kentucky Location in the United States
- Coordinates: 37°10′21″N 88°14′40″W
- Country: United States
- State: Kentucky
- County: Livingston
- Elevation: 345 ft (105 m)
- Time zone: UTC-6 (Central (CST))
  - Summer (DST): UTC-5 (CST)
- ZIP codes: 42083
- GNIS feature ID: 505281

Tiline is an unincorporated community in Livingston County, Kentucky, United States. It was also known as Cumberland Valley.
