= Thomas Bennett Community College =

- Current logo used by the school

Location
- Ashdown Drive; Crawley, West Sussex, RH10 5AD; England; 51.0992°N 0.1894°W

Information
- Type: Academy
- Motto: Aspire
- Established: 1958
- Local authority: West Sussex County Council
- Specialist: Sports
- Department for Education URN: 138620 Tables
- Ofsted: Reports
- Head teacher: Stuart Smith
- Gender: Coeducation
- Age: 11 to 19
- Enrolment: 1200
- Website: http://www.thomasbennett-tkat.org/

Thomas Bennett Community College (TBCC) is a secondary school in Crawley, West Sussex, England. It has academy status, and caters to approximately 1200 pupils in Years 7 to 14 (ages 11 to 19), including 160 in its sixth form.

Thomas Bennett Community College offers GCSEs and BTECs for pupils aged 11 to 16. Students in the sixth form have the option to study from a range of A-levels, further BTECs, CTECs and NVQ Diplomas.

== History ==
The school was planned as part of the development of Crawley as a new town in the late 1940s. Originally it had been intended to open a grammar school and two secondary modern schools on the Tilgate campus, although by the time the school was built, this plan changed to provide a bilateral secondary school for boys and girls for a trial period of two years. This entitled the school to run separate grammar and secondary modern departments as part of one school.

The school was named after Sir Thomas Bennett, the chairman of Crawley Development Corporation. This body had overseen the development of the New Town. Bennett officially opened the school in 1959 (the first pupils having joined the school in 1958). Although originally intended as a bilateral school, the staff of the school organised classes along comprehensive lines, with students working in sets depending on their ability in subjects, rather than broad streams. This idea proved so popular that the school became formally comprehensive by the end of the trial in 1960. By 1965, the school became one of the first in England to succeed in being truly comprehensive, with encouraging exam results, including disadvantaged children helped to fulfil their potential.

In 1974, local schools were reorganised in the area, and Thomas Bennett School became an Upper school for students aged 12 to 18, with former first year students remaining for an additional year in primary middle schools. This situation was then reversed in 2004, when reorganisation again returned the school to a full 11–18 secondary. Thomas Bennett became a community school in 1979. The student roll was 1,323 in 1984. The school converted to academy status in September 2012.

== Campus ==
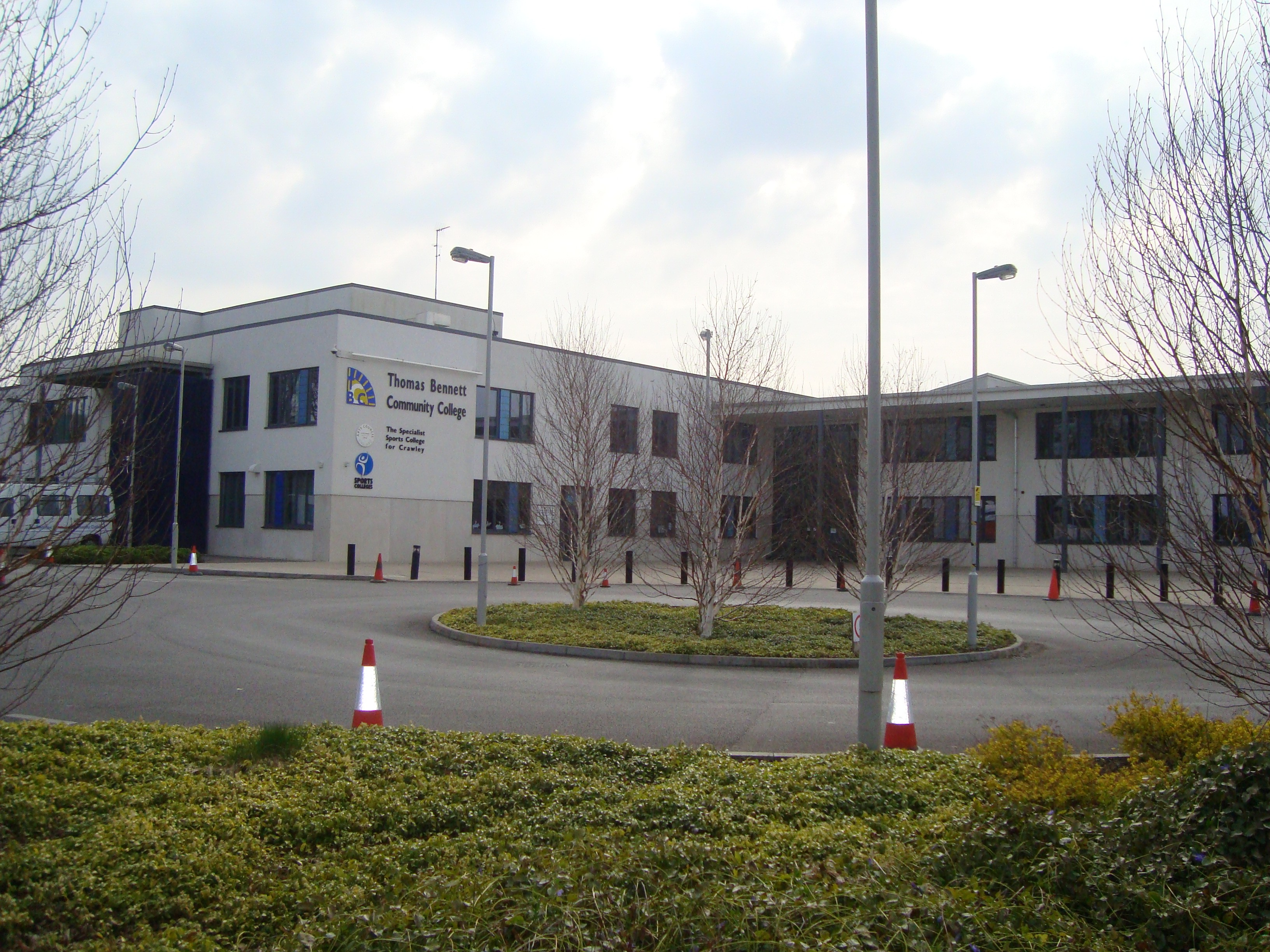
New buildings of Thomas Bennett Community College

The masterplan for Crawley New Town set aside the campus for the split-site school in the south-west corner of the neighbourhood of Tilgate between the A23 and Tilgate Forest. The campus contained both the Thomas Bennett school and the local primary school – Desmond Anderson School. In 1965, Thomas Bennett was the largest or one of the largest comprehensive schools in Great Britain.

The original school comprised first two and then three main buildings at opposite ends of the campus. The adjoining Ashdown and Southgate buildings provided facilities, with a further building – known as the Canterbury building – approximately 1/4-mile to the south-east. Uses of the buildings varied. In the 1960s and 1970s, the Canterbury building was used for 'lower school' pupils in the first two years of school, with 'upper school' pupils in fourth and fifth forms moving to the Southgate building, and sixth formers based in the Ashdown building. By the 1990s, pupils in the main part of the school were split equally between Canterbury and Southgate buildings, depending on their house.

Both Thomas Bennett and Desmond Anderson schools were re-built, opening in entirely new buildings in 2005. The campus is now shared with the town's main leisure facilities: K2 Leisure Centre. The current building, designed by Nicholas Hare Architects, houses all pupils from all year groups in a building built under a Private Finance Initiative scheme which replaced several schools in the town in the period 2004–2005. A Commission for Architecture and the Built Environment audit reported that the building was well-designed.

== Students ==
The school is entirely comprehensive, providing education for approximately 1200 pupils aged between 11 and 19 of all abilities. The school was formerly much larger with around 2000 pupils, but has reduced in recent years.

Most pupils attending the school live within the catchment area, and transfer from one of the local primary schools:

- Broadfield East Junior School
- Desmond Anderson Primary School
- Hilltop Primary School
- Seymour Primary School
- The Oaks Primary School
- Bewbush Academy Primary School

== Head-teachers ==
- 1958 -1965 Tim McMullen
- 1965 - 1972? Patrick (Pat) Daunt
- 1972?-1986 Jim Knight
- 1986 - 1994 Tony Elder
- 1994 - 2000 Michael Dunman
- (2000? - 2012) - Ms Yasmin Maskatiya
- (2012 - 2014) - Jayne Orviss
- (2014 - 2019) - Pauline Montalto
- (2020 - 2023) - Mr Stuart Smith
- (2023 - 2025) - Mrs Emer Lesova
- (2025-2026) - Mr Stuart Smith
- (2026-Present) - Mr Daniel Hatley [17]

== Notable former pupils and bands ==
- Brian Bason, Professional footballer, Midfielder (1972-1983)] for Chelsea, Plymouth Argyle, Crystal Palace, and Reading.
- Alan E. Bell, Technologist - Key in development of the universal format of CD's and the DVD's.
- Simon Calder, Travel correspondent and broadcast journalist. He won Christmas Celebrity Mastermind in 2011.
- Dawn Primarolo DBE PC, Labour Party MP for Bristol South from 1987 until 2015.
- Pearl Thompson, Musician and artist, most notably a guitarist for The Cure.
- Brett Marvin and the Thunderbolts original members from Thomas Bennett School, released self-titled album in 1970.
