= James F. Cardwell =

American businessman

James F. ("Jim") Cardwell is an entertainment industry consultant. He was president of Warner Home Video from 2002 to 2016. Since his departure from Warner Bros., Cardwell has focused on content production. He was the executive producer of the motion picture Bienvenue Cannes, through his production company TRMC, as well as producer of The Final Season.

From 2009 through 2015 Cardwell was chairman and CEO of the entertainment film company WR Entertainment.

In January 2016, Cardwell with his colleagues at WR Entertainment took the company public in Norway. In November 2016 the media announced a revolt by a group of WR shareholders, which sought to remove Cardwell as chairman. Following the departure of WR's founder and vice chairman, Ryan Wiik, the next day Cardwell was ousted by the shareholders in a 58% to 42% vote.

In April 2017 Cardwell sued WR Entertainment for breach of contract.
