= Gatwick Stream =

Stream in West Sussex, England

Coordinates: 51.16624°N 0.17529°W

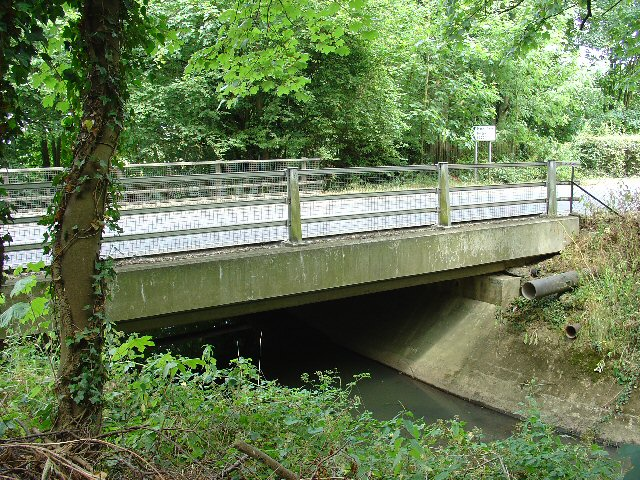
- Tinsley Bridge over the Gatwick Stream

Location
- Country: England
- Counties: West Sussex
- Districts / Boroughs: Horsham, Crawley
- Towns: Crawley

Physical characteristics
- Source
  - location: Worthlodge Forest, Mid Sussex, West Sussex
  - elevation: 115 m (377 ft)
- Mouth: River Mole
- Discharge
  - location: Gatwick Link
  - average: 0.72 m^{3}/s (25 cu ft/s)
  - minimum: 0.12 m^{3}/s (4.2 cu ft/s)(13 August 1976)
  - maximum: 14.7 m^{3}/s (520 cu ft/s)(24 December 2013)

The Gatwick Stream is a tributary of the River Mole in southern England. The Gatwick Stream rises in Worth Forest below Clays lake in West Sussex, flows northwards through Tilgate Forest, alongside Tilgate golf course, through Maidenbower, Three Bridges, and Tinsley Green to meet the River Mole on the border between West Sussex and Surrey.

== Wildlife ==
Native species of fish found in this stream include chub, dace, roach, gudgeon, perch, barbel, pike, millers thumb (bullhead), brook lamprey, stone loach, minnow and brown trout.

== Upper Mole Flood Alleviation Scheme ==
- 1) Raise the dam at Clays Lake to provide enlarged flood storage protecting passengers of the London-Brighton main line railway, also people living in Maidenbower, Crawley.
- 2) Provision of a new flood detention dam (FDR) at Worth Farm to add additional resilience to flood alleviation of the M23 motorway.
- 3) A river restoration scheme at Grattons Park nature reserve, involving the replacement of the existing straight concrete channel with a natural meandering earth channel.
- 4) The raising of the dam at Tilgate Lake to provide additional flood storage, protecting hundreds of homes vulnerable to flooding in Furnace Green, Pound Hill, Three Bridges, Tinsley Green and Horley.

== Sewage Treatment Works ==
Crawley Sewage Treatment Works is located adjacent to the stream, downstream of Crawley and discharges up to 15 Ml of water per day into the river.

== See also ==
- River Mole
