= Nix family =

Nix Ashburner Nix
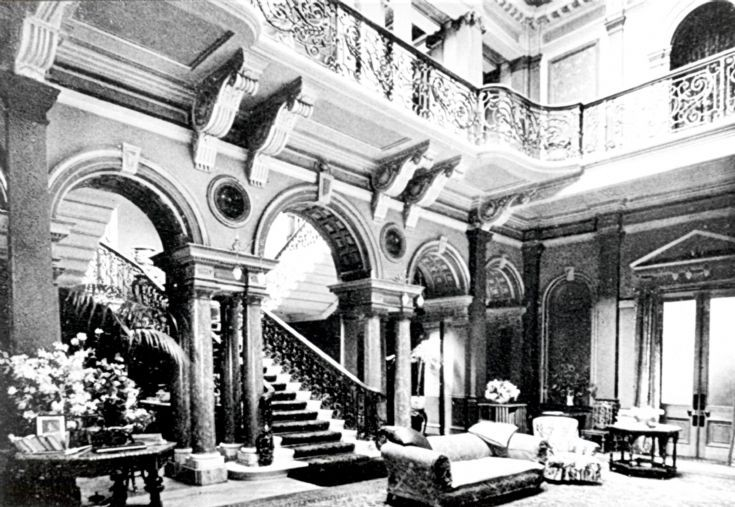
- Great hall at Tilgate House in Crawley, built for the Nix family in the 1860s
- Current region: England
- Connected families: Ashburner family; Brown of Richmond Hill; Paus family
- Estate: Tilgate House (1860s–1939)

The Nix and Ashburner Nix family, of London and Crawley, is an English banking family that became part of the landed gentry in the 19th century, with their family estate Tilgate House in Crawley. Members have been notable as bankers in the City of London, notably as partners in the London bank Fuller, Banbury, Nix & Co, and as large estate owners in Crawley and public officials in Sussex, where John Ashburner Nix served as High Sheriff in 1911. The family had ties to British colonial history, especially Colonial India in the 19th century, and inherited a significant part of their wealth from George Ashburner, a businessman born in India. More recently, family member Alexander Nix became known as CEO of Cambridge Analytica. The family is included as "Nix of Tilgate" in Burke's Landed Gentry.

== History ==
The family is descended from the leather cutter John Parfitt Nix (died 1802) of Tower Dock in the City of London. He was the father of John Nix (1791–1873), whose sons John Hennings Nix and Edward Winkelmann Nix were partners in the London private bank Fuller, Banbury, Nix & Co.

In 1865 John Hennings Nix married Sarah Ashburner (born 1845 in Calcutta), daughter of the wealthy Indian-born businessman George Ashburner (1810–1869); the Ashburner family had long-standing ties to India dating back to the East India Company's rule from the mid 18th century. John Hennings Nix acquired Tilgate House, a 2,185-acre estate in Crawley, from his father-in-law and built a new French-style great house in the 1860s. The staff working on the estate counted some 150 people. In 1904, the estate went to their son John Ashburner Nix, who served as High Sheriff of Sussex in 1911 and who died in 1927. The estate then passed to his brother Charles George Ashburner Nix who, on the outbreak of the Second World War in 1939, put it up for auction. Charles George Ashburner Nix won a silver medal at the 1908 Summer Olympics in London; he was married to Mildred, the daughter of James Clifton Brown and Amelia Rowe; the latter's father Charles was a free person of colour born out of wedlock in Jamaica to the "free Quadroon" Mary Gauntlett and the slave owner Charles Rowe, Sr., making him an "Octoroon" in the parlance of the time.

The sister of John and Charles Nix, Caroline Ashburner Nix (1869–1944), married Luigi Casimiro di Rovasenda, an Italian count, with noble descendants in Italy.

Charles George Ashburner Nix was the grandfather of the investment banker Paul David Ashburner Nix, who was one of the shareholders of SCL Group. The latter's son is Alexander James Ashburner Nix, a long-time director of SCL Group and former CEO of Cambridge Analytica, who is married to Olympia Paus, one of the heirs to the Norwegian shipping company Wilh. Wilhelmsen.

== Literature ==
- Pine, L. G. (1939). "Nix of Tilgate". Burke's Genealogical and Heraldic History of the Landed Gentry (16th ed.). p. 1686.
