= Charles Nix =

British sport shooter (1873–1956)

Personal information
- Born: 25 August 1873 Crawley, West Sussex, England
- Died: 3 March 1956 (aged 82) Crawley, West Sussex, England

Sport
- Sport: Sports shooting
Medal record
Men's shooting
Representing Great Britain
Olympic Games
| Silver medal – second place | 1908 London | Team running deer |

Charles George Ashburner Nix OBE (25 August 1873 – 3 March 1956) was a British sport shooter who competed at the 1908 Summer Olympics, where he won a silver medal.

Nix was educated at Eton College and the University of Cambridge. In the 1908 Olympics he won a silver medal in the team single-shot running deer event, was 10th in the single-shot running deer event and 11th in the double-shot running deer event.

A member of the Nix family, he was the son of John Hennings Nix, one of the partners in the London private bank Fuller, Banbury, Nix & Co, and Sarah Ashburner, an Indian-born wealthy heiress from Calcutta (now Kolkata). He inherited the family estate Tilgate House in Crawley from his older brother John Ashburner Nix in 1927, but sold the estate in 1939 as the family lived primarily in London. He was the great-grandfather of Alexander Nix.
