= Oriel High School =

Location
- Maidenbower Lane; Crawley, West Sussex, RH10 7XW; England; 51.1063°N 0.1576°W

Information
- Type: Community school, with SpLD Centre.
- Motto: Empowered to Achieve, Inspired to Excel (2009 – present); Opening Windows of Opportunity (2004–2009)
- Established: 2004
- Founder: Gillian Smith
- Local authority: West Sussex County Council
- Department for Education URN: 134042 Tables
- Ofsted: Reports
- Chair of Governors: Ben Chubb
- Headteacher: Philip Stack
- Gender: Mixed
- Age: 11 (Secondary Entrance) to 18 (6th Form)
- Enrolment: 1497 (Oversubscribed)
- Capacity: 1450
- Houses: Africa, Asia, America, Australasia
- Colour: Oriel Purple
- Website: https://oriel.w-sussex.sch.uk/

Oriel High School is a maintained coeducation community secondary school and sixth form for pupils aged 11 to 16, and 16 to 18 respectively. It opened in September 2004 as part of a reorganisation of secondary education in Crawley, catering for just 370 pupils in years 7 and 8. It was expected to grow to around 1450 pupils by 2009. It then grew to roughly 1600 students by 2015, and expanded once more to 2100 students in 2021, significantly oversubscribed due to only 1450 places available. This has reduced by 500 since 2024.

Oriel is rated "Good" by Ofsted as of 2019, and ranked as second to last out of all schools in Crawley.

== Location ==
The school is located at Maidenbower Lane in the Maidenbower neighbourhood of Crawley, West Sussex. With Student and Vehicular access from Matthews Drive, and pedestrian access from Furnace Green via a railway underpass as part of the 20-21 link, part of National Cycle Route 20.

== History ==
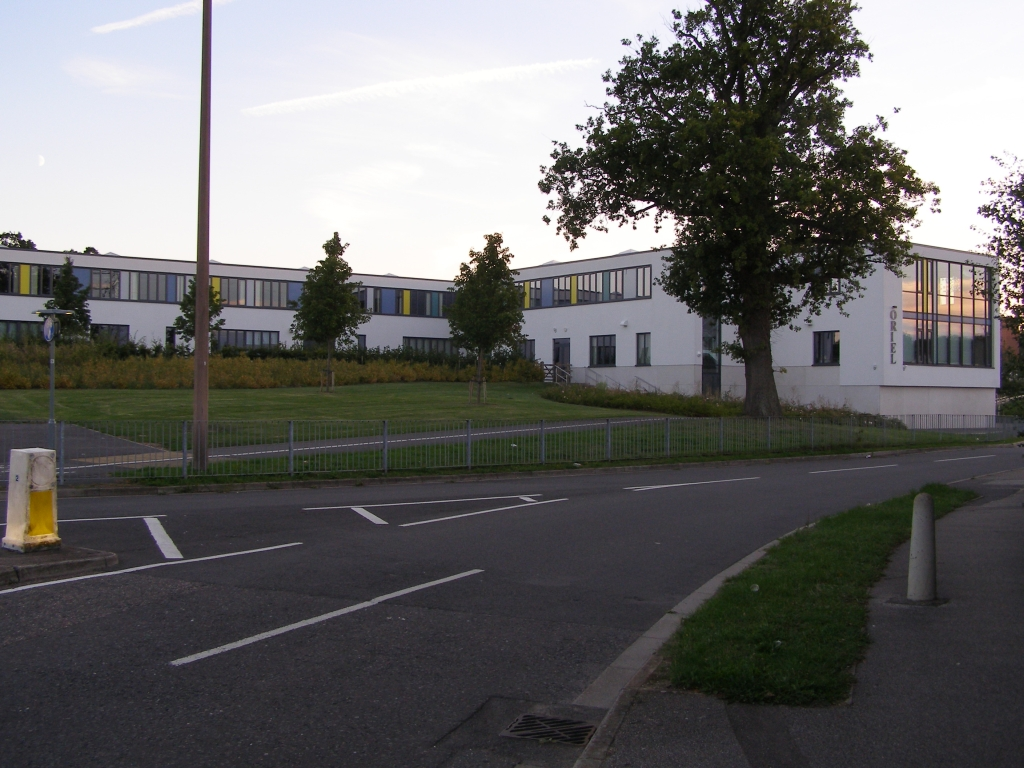
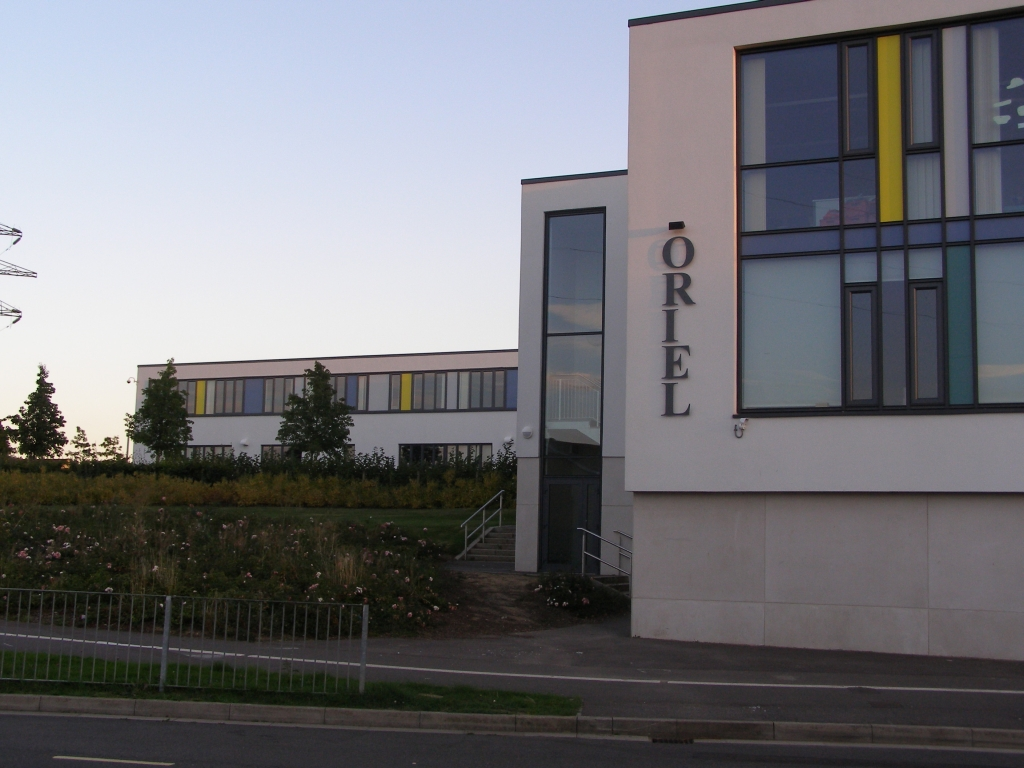
Photos of the school, one of the main entrance at Matthews Drive, Maidenbower (left) and one of the main Evacuation Assembly Point facing Fenchurch Road (right).

The school was opened by West Sussex County Council in early 2004 following a wholesale review of education provision in Crawley. After more than twenty years of providing education in a three-tier structure of first and middle Schools, with pupils transferring to secondary school at age twelve, the council reverted to the more traditional two-tier structure. Part of the plan for accommodating the larger number of pupils in secondary education in the town was to build a new school for the newly developed neighbourhood of Maidenbower. Two primary schools and one middle school had operated in the neighbourhood for some time, but secondary pupils had to travel to Hazelwick School or Thomas Bennett Community College

Oriel High School opened to pupils in September 2004, initially for an intake of around 370 pupils in years 7 and 8. The school continues to accept a new entry of pupils in each academic year, gradually increasing the provision offered. A sixth-form opened in 2008, with a full 11–18 school operating by 2009.

== Notable former pupils ==
- Emily Rickman, operations scientist for the European Space Agency (ESA) at the Space Telescope Science Institute
