= Tilgate Park =

Recreational park in Crawley, England

Coordinates: 51°5′39.3″N 0°10′40.85″W

Tilgate Park is a large recreational park situated south of Tilgate, south-east Crawley, England.

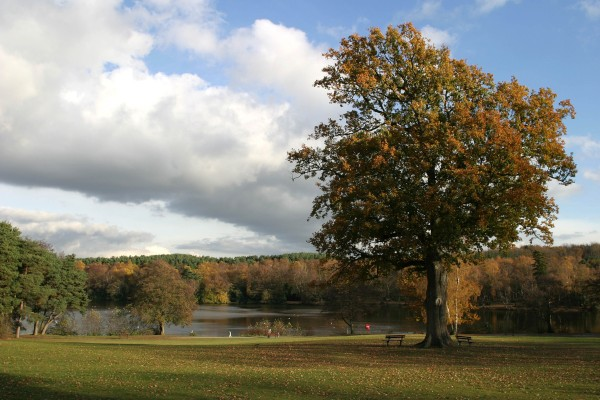
Tilgate Lake. Photograph taken facing roughly southeast.

Originally a 2,185-acre (8.84 km^{2}) part of the ancient Worth Forest, the park and adjacent areas (including the modern-day Furnace Green, Three Bridges, part of Southgate and Tilgate Forest) were part of the larger Tilgate Estate.

Although visitor activity is mostly focused on the area surrounding Tilgate Lake and on the adjacent gardens of a former country mansion, a large area of the park is former silvicultural forest. This is now managed as a Local Nature Reserve called Tilgate Forest. The park also contains the Tilgate Nature Centre featuring captive breeding of some vulnerable and endangered animal species and varieties.

== History ==
=== Prehistory ===
Worked flint tools of the Mesolithic "Horsham Culture" have been found in numbers in the park, including so-called "Horsham Point" arrowheads of the 8th millennium BCE. The major find-spot is now on the Golf Course, at TQ28593458.

Geologically the park is on the Hastings Beds, dominated by sandstone with pockets of clay and iron ore. This produces poor, acidic and nutritionally deficient soils which, paradoxically, supported a varied natural plant cover. After the end of the Ice Age, especially after the extinction of the herbivorous megafauna, tree cover began to dominate the landscape from about 8500 BCE which marks the beginning of the Mesolithic Age. However, the vegetation of the High Weald, of which the park is a part, was more vulnerable owing to the poverty of the soils and so supported open woodland shading into grassland and heathland on high areas, with thick woodland confined to the narrow valleys. This landscape was very attractive to hunter-gatherer groups, who might have encouraged grassland and discouraged tree growth by summer burning of the former.

The only evidence of activity by Neolithic (c4500 to c2500 BCE) farmers around the park have been two finds. The Mesolithic site on the Golf Course, mentioned above, also produced a polished flint axe. Also a polished arrowhead and broken polished axe were found in a field to the south of the park -the recorder thought that this evidence had ritual significance.

In the following Bronze Age (c2500 to 800 BCE) a round barrow cemetery was established west of Pease Pottage on the ancient ridgeway running along the watershed above the park (now the set of roads from Horsham to Pease Pottage, Handcross and Turners Hill).

=== Iron age and Romans ===
There is now evidence of Iron Age activity in the region, after a recent re-excavation of a major Roman ironworking site at Broadfield, just west of the park. Beginning of activity here, and in Southgate West just north, is considered to be of late Iron Age origin.

However, a recent (2011) archaeological survey of Tilgate Forest found no positive evidence of Roman ironworking activity there. The only possibly Roman feature was a single "mine-pit" found south of the Tilgate Forest Recreation Centre, west of Titmus Lake at TQ269343 and so near the Roman ironworks. "Mine" is Sussex dialect for iron ore, and the feature was a bell pit which might have been dug much later.

It is now accepted that the Romans were managing the entire High Weald as a strategic asset of military significance for the sake of its iron, and so were discouraging civilian settlement. The chain of command involved the Classis Britannica.

=== Saxons ===
The Saxons were certainly interested in using the thick woodland fringing the High Weald for pannage or transhumance involving feeding pigs on acorns. Local place names ending in -ley or -den indicate woodland clearings, mutating into farmsteads as transient swineherds became sedentary farmers and were joined by other immigrants. Crawley was one of these, and the dense woodland belt north of the sandstone of the Park would have been settled in this way.

=== Middle ages ===
Public information about the park mentions the possibility that there was mediaeval ironworking here. The method of the period involved digging up an iron ore outcrop and reducing it in a "bloomery" or clay pot-furnace using charcoal and muscle-powered bellows. This exiguous procedure would leave very little archaeological evidence, especially if the slag was scavenged for road making. Crawley was formally founded in 1202 when it received its market charter, and evidence has been found of ironworking on its first burgage tenements. Iron ore outcropped in the clay around Crawley as well as in the sandstone of the park, and there would have been less work to dig it out of the clay. The latter would have also provided the material for making the bloomeries.

The first possible reference to Tilgate as a place is in 1296, when a tax return mentions one William Yllegate. This is analysed as "Illan Geat" or "entrance into the forest belonging to Illan".

=== Deer park? ===
Speed's map of Sussex, published 1610, shows Worth Forest with two enclosed deer parks -Paddockhurst (now Worth Abbey) and Tilgate. Paddockhurst Park still features on modern maps, but there is no discernible traces of a deer park in the modern Tilgate Park. If any deer park was here, it might have been on the site of the present Tilgate Playing Fields, where a random scatter of large, spreading oak trees was recorded on the 1875 large-scale Ordnance Survey map (a few survive).

=== Tilgate Furnace ===
==== Blast furnaces and forges ====
The landscape of the Park area changed drastically when the blast furnace was introduced into English ironworking in the late Middle Ages. The first was erected in 1490, and it transformed the Wealden iron industry.

Unlike a clay pot bloomery, in which the iron didn't quite melt, a blast furnace provided a continuous supply of liquid iron. It was a hollow brick tower, with iron ore and charcoal put into the top and molten iron tapped out of the bottom. A strong blast of air was provided by a pair of huge water-powered bellows (a pair so that the air flow did not pulse). The very important point about the furnace was, it had to operate continuously throughout its lifespan. A shortage of any one of its three ingredients (ore, charcoal, air) would destroy the furnace. The ironmasters had to plan very carefully to ensure a continuous supply of the three.

The first local blast furnaces were two at "Worth Furnace", erected by one Willam Leavitt in 1547. This was on the Stamford Brook in the present Worth Forest, just to the north of the eastern end of the railway bridge on the Parish Lane from Pease Pottage (the bridle path here crosses the site of the old millpond, south of the dam and slag heaps). "Tilgate Furnace" first appears in 1606, when a lease was renewed so it had already been in production by then. The two furnaces, Worth and Tilgate, were associated with forges downstream at Blackwater (now in Maidenbower) and at Tinsley.

==== Charcoal ====
Charcoal for firing the furnace was too fragile to carry far, so must have been sourced locally. The 2011 archaeological survey found two charcoal oven platforms in the Forest. A steady supply of charcoal was so important that Wealden ironmasters were entering into coppice wood futures, buying supplies before they had grown. The myth is that the iron industry destroyed woodland. This is completely false, but rather the government in the 16th and 17th centuries was opposed to the conversion of timber woodland to coppice woodland for strategic reasons (building ships needed good timber) and what it called "wasted woods" were those lacking timber trees.

==== End of ironworking ====
The last reference to the working furnace dates to 1664, when the furnace was demolished and rebuilt. There is a reference to a road to the furnace in 1685. However, in 1690 "Tilgate Farm" was operated as a tenancy and the tenant farmer was responsible for keeping the lake dams in repair. They had become fish-ponds, so the furnace was gone.

From that time, Tilgate began its evolution into a landed working estate.

=== Landed estate ===
==== Rabbits ====
After the closure of the Furnace, the Forest was converted to commercial rabbit warrens. This involved creating so-called "pillow mounds" for the rabbits to burrow into, which can be found in the present Worth and Highbeeches Forests. None has been found in the present Tilgate Forest, however, but later improvement works may have removed them.

Tilgate Lake had a corn-mill in the 18th century, first mentioned in 1702. This was still in operation in 1827 later a house called "Lakeside" (not to be confused with the later restaurant).

The use of the Forest for rabbits suppressed coppice woodland in favour of short grassland with pollard beeches and oaks, some heathland and also woodland surviving in the narrow valleys. The Yeakell and Gardner 1783 map shows the Forest as heath, also the two Park lakes and the surviving Furnace lake next to "Furnace Farm". The lane to the latter from Three Bridges was to become the main drive to the Mansion.

==== Manor? ====
The mediaeval farm had probably been rebuilt by 1647, which is the year of the first reference to " Tilgate Manor Estate". A huge Sweet chestnut near "Lower Tilgate" is a relic.

The alleged manor passed with that of Slaugham down the Covert family line, before passing to another family, the Sergisons, in 1702. However, the London Gazette of 1827 referred to it as a "reputed manor" because the estate has never been part of the English manorial system.

==== Improvements ====
Later that century, the Sergisons embarked on a massive set of improvements to the Forest. These included drainage ditches, still to be found in the wooded area. If the 2011 archaeological survey is correct in surmising these ditches to date from that time, then the Sergisons intended to clear the present Forest for farmland. They did clear the central tier along Parish Lane and turned it into four farms -Hardriding (formerly Belle Vue), New Buildings, Starvemouse and Mount Pleasant.

The first farm listed was very odd. It included a set of circular fields surrounded by woodland. These still existed in 1841, as the Worth tithe map of that year shows them, but the woodland took over the northern ones later.

Also, the family moved Tilgate Manor. The first Ordnance Survey map, 1813, shows "Tilgate Farm" (Lower Tilgate) and "Tilgate Lodge" next to the later Mansion.

To the south of the Lodge was a formal garden, and beyond this to the west and south were small fields cleared from the Forest to create a "Home Farm".

In 1827, as well as the Forest the Estate included four farms: Tilgate, Furnace, Maidenbower and "Highwood's" (Malthouse?). Maidenbower Farm was only part of the present Maidenbower estate, which also covers the former Frogshole and Forest Farms.

==== Crawley's Lost Route to Balcombe ====
The 1813 map shows the lane from Crawley continuing on top of the lake dam to Worth Furnace, then through Greentrees Farm and down what is now Crawley Lane to Balcombe. 19th-century improvements suppressed the portions from Crawley to Tilgate and in Worth Forest (the latter has been recently reinstated as a bridle path).

==== Mansion and gardens ====
The Sergisons sold out in 1814. After a succession of owners in the early 19th century, the estate was inherited in 1862 by a wealthy businessman from India, George Ashburner. Back then, as well as the Forest the Estate included all the farmland south of the road between Crawley and Three Bridges. It had acquired Hogs Hill Farm (now Southgate West estate), also the present Hardriding Farm next to Pease Pottage.

Ashburner's daughter Sarah married John Hennings Nix, in 1865 at St Nicholas' Church, Worth. The groom was partners with his brother Edward Winkelmann Nix in the London bank Fuller, Banbury, Nix & Co (since absorbed by NatWest). The couple took over the estate from her father when he died in 1869.

It was Nix who built a large French-style mansion to replace the Lodge in the later 1860s. The architect was Thomas Henry Wyatt.

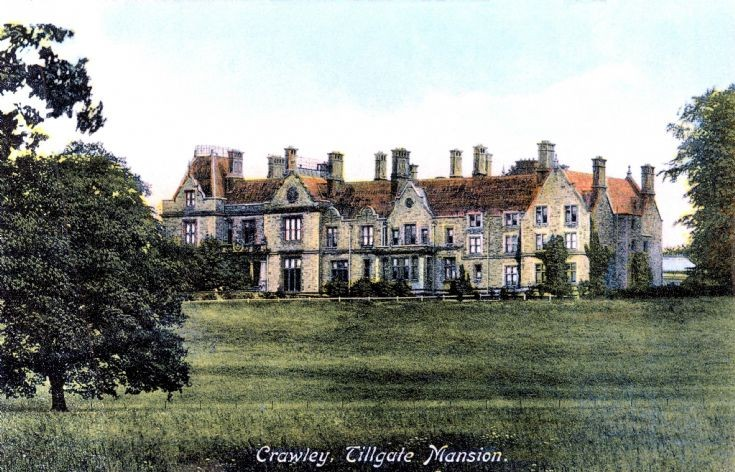
Tilgate House, built for the Ashburner Nix family

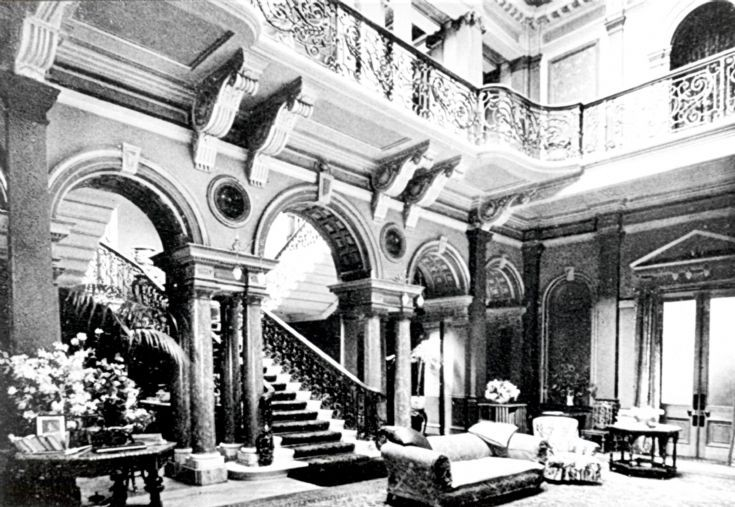
Great hall at Tilgate House, built for the Ashburner Nix family

The present gardens were laid out between 1875 and 1900 over the previous formal garden and Home Farm fields, with many rare specimen trees and shrubs. The top end of Tilgate Lake was extended to Silt Lake, two islands formed and a Cascade created. Also, the Walled Garden was built with a "Head Gardener's Cottage" on its access drive (now a private house).

Confusingly, a deer park was established north of the Mansion, occupying the area of the present neighbourhood south of Shackleton Road and west of Worcester Road. This had Fallow deer. A new farmstead called "Stone Barn" was built at what is now the south end of the latter road.

In the late 19th century, the Park and Forest became nationally known for several botanical rarities (apparently mostly now extinct here) including the Tunbridge Filmy Fern (Hymenophyllum tunbrigense).

On Sarah's death in 1904, the estate went to her son John Ashburner Nix, who died in 1927, and then to his brother Charles George Ashburner Nix; the Nix family is included in Burke's Landed Gentry under the title "Nix of Tilgate." The latter's grandson was the banker Paul David Ashburner Nix, the father of Alexander Nix, the CEO of Cambridge Analytica. Together the brothers were great horticulturalists and members of the Royal Horticultural Society. They planted the Pinetum in 1906, and began conifer plantations in the Forest. A sawmill was built on the A23, at the beginning of a forest ride running east to where the pylons are now. This was called The Avenue.

==== Eponymous fossil site ====
Fossilised dinosaur remains have been recovered from a Mesozoic geologic formation named after Tilgate Forest. The find-spot was a quarry at Whitemans Green near Cuckfield, but the name given to the stratum led to the erroneous idea that the Forest was the find-spot. This mistake has influenced scholarly works. The finder was Gideon Mantell, who was collecting in the quarry by 1813 and named the "Tilgate Forest Stratum". The dinosaur concerned was the Iguanodon.

==== Rare orchid ====
A very rare orchid was collected at Tilgate from the late 19th century into the Thirties -Small white orchid (Pseudorchis alba). The nearest colonies are now in mid Wales.

==== Decline ====
Charles was in difficulties by 1932, when he leased the Walled Garden and its greenhouses to FW Burke & Co as a Horticultural research Station. This would have marked the end of intensive gardening at Tilgate, and the loss of flower beds.

Before the outbreak of the Second World War in 1939, Charles put the Estate up for auction. No bidder was found, so the auctioneers split the property into separate lots which were sold off individually.

During the War, as part of the build-up for D-Day Canadian army troops were billeted at a camp in woodland west of Titmus Lake, featuring Nissen huts. After the War, in 1947, the site was acquired by the Crawley Development Corporation and the huts began to be rented out to leisure clubs and societies seeking premises. In this the "Tilgate Forest Recreation Centre" grew up (it was never a public amenity).

In 1950, the Forestry Commission bought the Forest and began to plant conifers over most of it, with areas of beech and American oak.

The biggest lake in the park, Tilgate Lake, is most famous for its association with Malcolm Campbell, who carried out flotation trials for his boat "Bluebird" but not water speed trials there. It was called Campbell's Lake for some time afterwards, although it was sold to a Mr Baker in 1952. He ran a fishing club. Bluebird was still tested on the lake into the late 1950s early 1960s.

The Mansion was sold to BT Estates Ltd in 1940, which used it as offices and let the gardens go derelict. Rhododendron ponticum thickets took over large areas, including the lakesides.

In 1950, the Walled Garden became "Tilgate Park Nurseries" which had another site in the Forest south of the sawmill at "Old Stone Cottage Farm". The firm supplied sapling trees for the New Town.

Tilgate neighbourhood was built between 1958 and 1960. The Park project was delayed, however, leading to conflict between the private landowners and trespassers, especially children.

=== Development of the public park ===
==== Early days ====
Crawley Urban District Council (Borough Council from 1974) purchased the Walled Garden in 1962, and the lakes and Mansion in 1964. It demolished the latter in 1965, and replaced it with the striking modern "Lakeside Restaurant".

In this period, roe deer returned to the Forest.

The Nissen huts were extensively damaged during the storms of 1987 and the council planned to clear the area, but a campaign led by local teacher and prominent table tennis figure, Frank Terry, succeeded in getting the huts replaced with more modern versions.

The lake has a "Watersports Centre". In contrast, "Go Ape" is a new arboreal adventure course.

In 2017, a "Garden of Remembrance" was opened, with a sculpture entitled "Passage".

== Access ==
=== Car ===
Tilgate Park is accessible through two vehicle entrances, converging on the main car park. The main one runs from the south end of Titmus Drive in Tilgate neighbourhood, where a road also runs west to the Lakeside car park and the Golf Centre. Unlike the main car park, Lakeside is free for most of the morning (until 11:00).

The other entrance is at the A23 K2 traffic lights, and runs through the Recreation Centre.

=== Bus ===
There are buses from Crawley Bus Station, on route 2 run by Metrobus (South East England). This terminates at the main car park on weekends only. On weekdays, it terminates at K2 and the best access is walking from the stop at Tilgate shops which is ten minutes for a young adult.

The journey time from Bus Station to Park is 40 minutes, since the route is circuitous.

=== Horses and bikes ===
Owing to a conflict of interests, the park is not a place for horses or bikes. Riders use the Forest. There is a dedicated bridleway from Rosamund Road across the Golf Course to a motorway bridge into the Forest, and a permissive path from the east side of the Golf Centre bridge at Lakeside through the LNR to the same Forest access.

=== Foot ===
A path to Titmus Lake runs from Gloucester Road, and a footpath runs from Weald Drive along the brook to Lakeside.

=== Tilgate Drive ===
The original main entrance to the old estate was at Tilgate Lodge – now a bank – near Three Bridges railway station. This was the beginning of a long driveway, which is now an amenity footpath and cycle track. Unfortunately, the path is broken in Furnace Green by Furnace Farm Road which has to be followed.

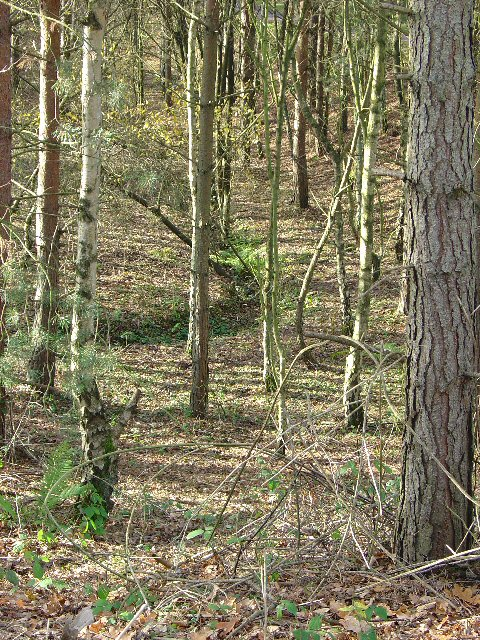
Coniferous Wooded Part of Tilgate Forest, Nr Crawley, West Sussex. This view shows typical vegetation in much of this part of Tilgate Forest: pine trees (with the odd invading birch) with a fairly clean forest floor. The trees tend to form quite a dense canopy, preventing much from growing beneath them. The ditch is part of the drainage network.

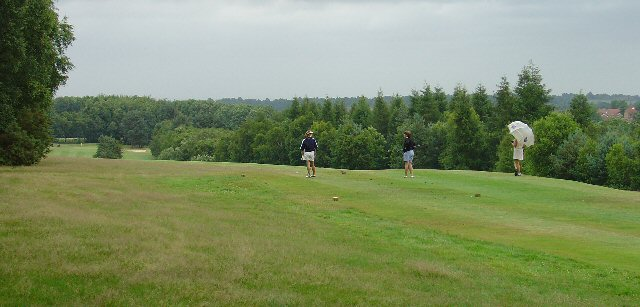
Tilgate Golf Course, Crawley. Grid square TQ2834 is dominated by most of an 18-hole golf course. This fine course is popular and the view here shows three ladies enjoying a round on a Friday afternoon

== Park layout ==
A view-marker is at the north side of the car park. The south side has a small reception block with toilets.

To the south of this is the massive podium of the demolished Mansion, on which stands the Smith & Western restaurant. Next to this to the west is the old Stables, now a set of private residences called "Tilgate Mansions" (not to be confused with the demolished Mansion).

Due west of the car park is the A23 driveway to the Recreation Centre. South-westwards runs a road to the Walled Garden. Before the latter is the Heather Garden to the right, with a steep path down to Titmus Lake. Next on the right is the Nature Centre, which abuts the Walled Garden on its west side. Next to the Walled Garden to the east is the Azalea Wood and the Garden of Remembrance.

To the east of the car park is a wooded area, containing a children's play area and "Go Ape". Downslope from this is the Main Lawn, running down to Tilgate Lake and the Watersports Centre. A path runs across the dam and down the east side of the lake to Silt Lake.

Round the other side of the restaurant and heading south is the Promenade, with the Winter Garden to the right (west) and the World Garden to the left. Both contain rare trees and shrubs. The Promenade meets a path from the Walled Garden, turns left (east) and runs to the Silt Lake. Before the lake, the Peace Garden is to the right, beyond which is the Pinetum and the Park's motorway bridge to the Forest. The Promenade continues over the Cascade to "Tilgate Forest LNR", a nature reserve. Here a path takes you to the Golf Course's motorway bridge.

== Amenities ==
=== Parking ===
The main car park has a fee, while the "Lakeside" overflow car park is free before 11:00, but has no facilities.

=== Gardens ===
The gardens are free.

The Rhododendrons are spectacular in spring along the Promenade, and in the World Garden and Winter Garden. The Heather Garden with its collection of Ericaceae is attractive in late summer, but also contains mature rhododendrons and azaleas. The Winter Garden has no indoor areas or greenhouses, but is designed to be interesting in winter (hence the name).

An old colony of wind daffodils is to the west of the Promenade heading south from the restaurant, and an area of bluebells was planted around the new wildlife pond east of the main lake in 2015.

=== Tree trail ===
Owen Johnson pointed out the importance of the Park's tree collection in 1998, in his "Sussex Tree Book". In response, the Council has produced a guided tree trail leaflet, has labelled the more important specimens and invited sponsorship.

The following are the trees selected for the Tree Trail, including those listed by Johnson as Champions. Unless otherwise indicated, they were planted by the Nix family:

- 1) Formosan Cypress (Chamaecyparis formosensis). Winter Garden. Three Champions in a clump. Rare.
- 2) Roblé Beech. (Nothofagus obliqua). Winter Garden. Champion.
- 3) Paperbark Maple (Acer griseum) Winter Garden. Council planted.
- 4) Sessile Oak (Quercus petraea). World Garden. Original Forest tree?
- 5) Cork Oak (Quercus suber). World Garden. Council planted.
- 6) Chinese Dogwood (Cornus kousa). World Garden. Champion.
- 7) Handkerchief Tree (Davidia involucrata). World Garden. Formerly a large tree blown over in 1987, but the stump was left and it sprouted.
- 8) Chusan Palm. (Trachycarpus fortunei). World Garden. Two.
- 9) Yellow Birch (Betula alleghaniensis). World Garden. Champion.
- 10) Yellow-wood (Cladrastis kentukea) World Garden. Champion.
- 11) Keyaki (Zelkova serrata). World Garden. Champion.
- 12) Dieck's Maple (Acer x dieckii). World Garden. Champion. This is an old example of a garden hybrid between Norway Maple (Acer platanoides) and Lobel's Maple (Acer lobelii).
- 13) Scheidecker's Crab-apple (Malus x scheideckeri). World Garden. Champion. Another garden hybrid, between Japanese Crab-apple (Malus floribunda) and Plum Leaved Crab-apple (Malus prunifolia).
- 14) Chinese Stewartia (Stewartia sinensis). World Garden. National Champion.
- 15) Swamp Cypress (Taxodium distichum). World Garden, on island in pond. Council planted.
- 16) Rocky Mountain Douglas Fir (Pseudotsuga menziesii var. glauca). Pinetum. Champion. Planted 1896, a decade before the Pinetum. Struck by lightning.
- 17) Monkey Puzzle (Araucaria araucana). Pinetum.
- 18) Eastern Hemlock (Tsuga canadensis). Pinetum. Champion. Also planted 1895.
- 19) Japanese Red Cedar (Cryptomeria japonica). Pinetum.
- 20) Dawn Redwood (Metasequoia glyptostroboides). By main lake, at site of demolished second boathouse. Council planted.
- 21) Sweet Chestnut (Castanea sativa). South of restaurant. 18th century. Large.
- 22) Horse Chestnut (Aesculus hippocastanum). South of restaurant.
- 23) Giant Sequoia (Sequoiadendron giganteum). South of restaurant. Champion.
- 24) Apollo Fir (Abies cephalonica var. apollinis). South of restaurant. National champion.
- 25) Redwood (Sequoia sempervirens). South of restaurant. Council planted 1963, thriving.
- 26) Blue Atlas Cedar (Cedrus atlantica var. glauca). South of restaurant. Champion.
- 27) Tulip tree (Liriodendron tulipifera). South of restaurant. 18th century. Champion.
- 28) Ginkgo (Ginkgo biloba). North of restaurant. Council planted, 1970 in commemoration of the Atomic bombings of Hiroshima and Nagasaki.
- 29) Monterey Pine (Pinus radiata). Walled Garden drive.
- 30) English Oak (Quercus robur). Original Forest tree. Walled Garden drive.

Johnson lists the following Champions which are not on the Trail:

- Caucasian Fir (Abies nordmanniana). West shore of main lake.
- Redvein Maple (Acer rufinerve). Winter Garden, near Walled Garden. Dying in 1998.
- Hupeh Rowan (Sorbus hupehensis). Winter Garden, near Walled Garden.
- Deodar (Cedrus deodara var. robusta). East of Walled Garden. Rare variety.
- White Ash (Fraxinus americana). Near Nature Centre entrance.
- Sweet Bay (Magnolia virginiana). World Garden. Rare.
- Black Oak (Quercus velutina var. rubrifolia). World Garden.
- Japanese Umbrella Pine (Sciadopitys verticillata). Pinetum, next to Douglas Fir mentioned above.
- Japanese White Pine (Pinus parviflora). Peace Garden.
- Golden Thuja (Thuja plicata var. zebrina). Pinetum.

The following trees are also of note:

- Cedar of Lebanon (Cedrus libani). Two on way to Golf Course.
- Giant Sequoia (Sequoiadendron giganteum). The Park's second one is hidden in an overgrown area below the main lake dam.
- Yew (Taxus baccata). The Park's largest yew tree was at the east end of the main dam. When the dam was heightened after 2011, efforts were made to keep it but it took offence and died.
- Sweet Chestnut (Castanea sativa). Huge old tree near "Lower Tilgate".
- Blue Atlas Cedar (Cedrus atlantica var. laxus). A weird weeping Cedar in the Pinetum. Planted by the Council, not happy but growing very slowly.

The Forest lacks specimen trees, but there is a Brewer's Weeping Spruce (Picea breweriana) at the ruins of Keeper's Cottage. The Park lost its specimen in 1987.

=== Restaurant ===
The "Smith & Western" is part of a restaurant chain with a Western American theme. In 2018 it was open from 11:00 to 23:00, except on Sundays when it was 12:00 to 10:00. No refund of any parking fee is advertised.

=== Go Ape ===
"Go Ape" is a rather small arboreal off-ground adventure course. There are two routes, one for adults and one for children. A winter closure occurs in December.

=== Watersports ===
A variety of water sports are offered on the main lake by a private company called "Tilgate Water Sports", which runs the "Tilgate Park Watersports Center", and (according to the Council) has management responsibility for fishing on the lakes. The following are available:

- Dinghy rowing
- Canoeing
- Kayaking
- Dinghy sailing
- Paddleboarding
- Raft building

Because Tilgate Forest lacks reception facilities, this firm also offers the following which mostly take place there:

- Orienteering
- Mountain biking (there are bikes for hire)
- Team building

There are also special events.

=== Angling ===
Fishing on the Tilgate and Silt Lakes is under the aegis of two clubs, the "Crawley Angling Society" and the "Tilgate Park Fisheries". There are big carp in the main lake. Day tickets are available.

=== Golf ===
The Golf Centre has an 18-hole course, a driving range, a shop, a resident pro and a bar open to the public. It has its own car parking.

=== Tilgate Nature Centre ===
Tilgate Nature Centre is a local Nature reserve financed by the local council and features over 100 different species of animals including endangered wild birds and threatened domestic (farm) mammals. Education programs are offered for children, families and schools. There is a small charge.

=== Walled Garden ===
The Walled Garden contains a hedge maze, a café and several craft emporia. Shire horses have been kept here.

=== Garden of Remembrance ===
Ashes can be deposited or scattered at the new Garden of Remembrance, around a dedicated sculpture. There is a charge.

=== Recreation Centre ===
As well as premises of clubs and societies, the "Recreation Centre" has a commercial gym.

=== Biking ===
The Forest has four named bike trails, with some portions rather casually laid out. They are: "Tilgate Slalom", "Toasty", "The Deer Hunter" and"Noon Ride". There are no reception facilities in the Forest itself.

== Bibliography ==
Butler, Chris et al.: "A Lidar-enhanced Archaeological Survey of Tilgate Forest" 2011. Available online:"Archaeological Survey".

Sussex Gardens Trust: "Report On The History Of Crawley Parks" 2013. Chapter on Tilgate Park available as a download: "History Report" (PDF).

Cleere, Henry: "The Iron Industry of Roman Britain" 1981. Available online: "Roman Iron" (PDF).

Straker, E: "Wealden Iron" David & Charles 1931.

Cleere, H.et al.: "The Iron Industry of the Weald" Merton Priory Press 1995. Available online: "Iron Industry" (PDF).

Hodgkinson, J: The Wealden Iron Industry" History Press 2008.

Johnson, O: "Sussex Tree Book" Pomegranate Press 1998.

de Crespigny, E. Champion: A New London Flora 1877.
