= Tilgate Nature Centre =

Zoo in Crawley, West Sussex, founded 1966

Tilgate Zoo
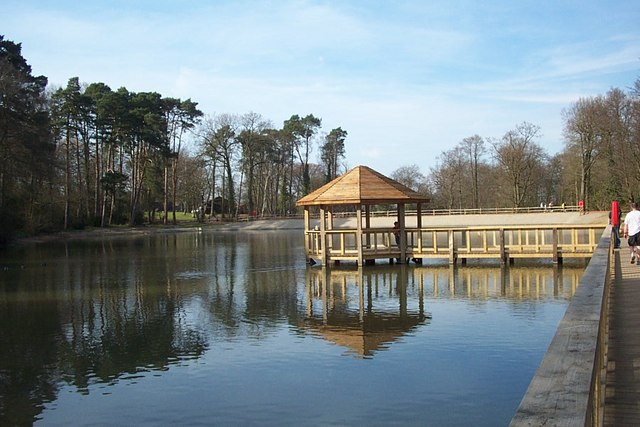
- Duck sanctuary at Titmus Lake, Tilgate
- Interactive map of Tilgate Zoo
- 51.0935556°N 0.183262°W
- Date opened: 1973
- Location: Tilgate Park, Tilgate Drive, Crawley, West Sussex, England
- No. of species: 74
- Annual visitors: ~70,000
- Major exhibits: African, American, Australasian, Madagascan, European, and Domestic Zone
- Website: Tilgate Zoo Website

Tilgate Zoo is a small BIAZA-accredited zoo located within Tilgate Park in Tilgate Forest, South-East Crawley, West Sussex, England. The zoo holds 74 different animal species (in 2026), and is involved in several programmes to preserve threatened wild species from extinction.

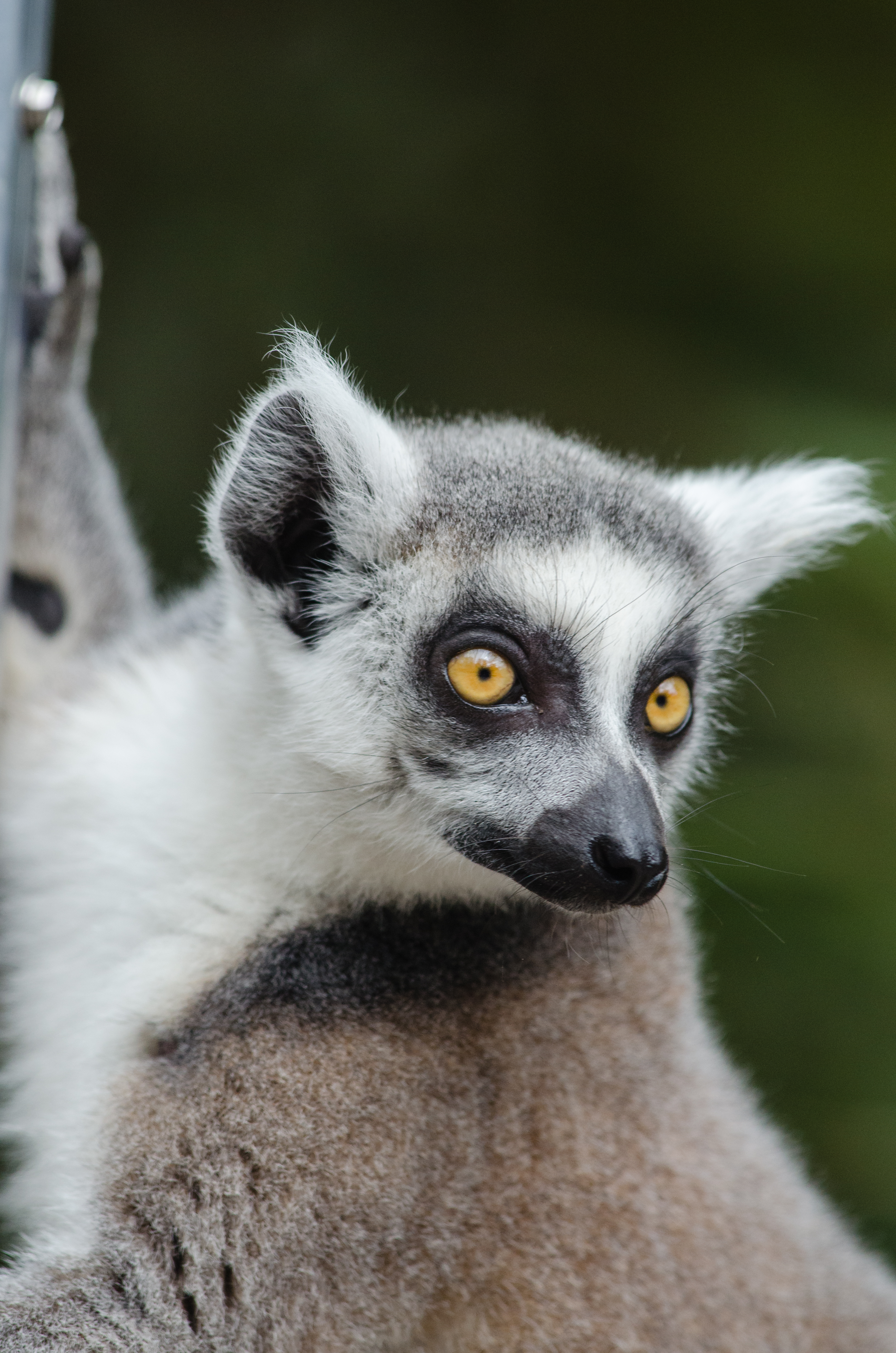
Ring-tailed lemur

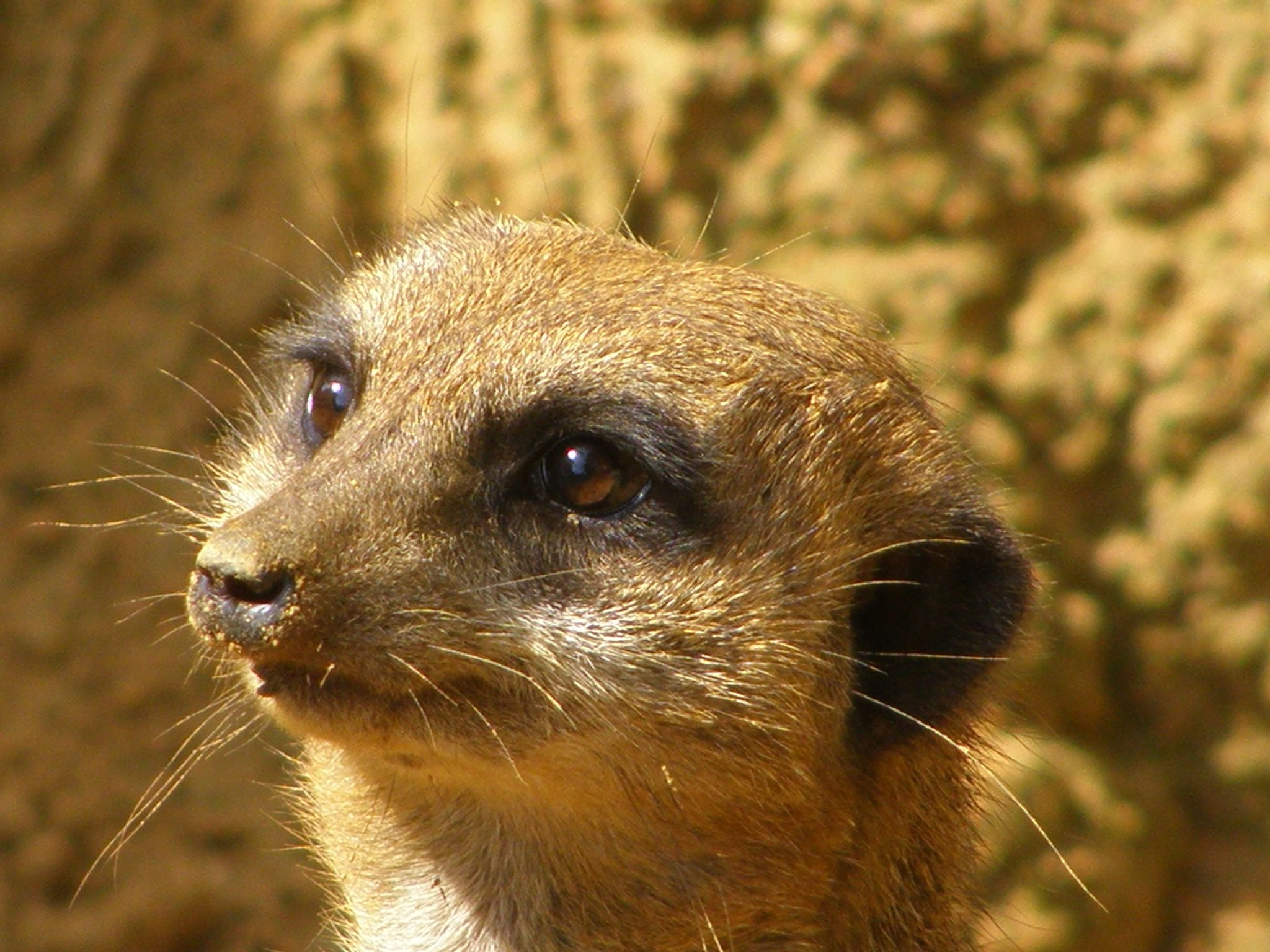
Meet the Meerkats

== History ==
Tilgate Park was purchased in 1966 by Crawley Borough Council with the Nature Centre eventually opening in 1973. Initially it was used to breed ducklings for introduction into the three lakes at Tilgate, namely Campbells, Silt and Titmus. The zoo's focus changed over the years, and it now houses an impressive animal collection including reindeer, owls, parrots, mongooses, snakes, tarantulas, lizards and various invertebrates. Tilgate Zoo is, and has been, involved in several programmes for threatened species such as the Scottish wild cat, the harvest mouse and the radiated tortoise. Notably it also participated in fen raft spider (Dolomedes plantarius) reintroduction efforts.

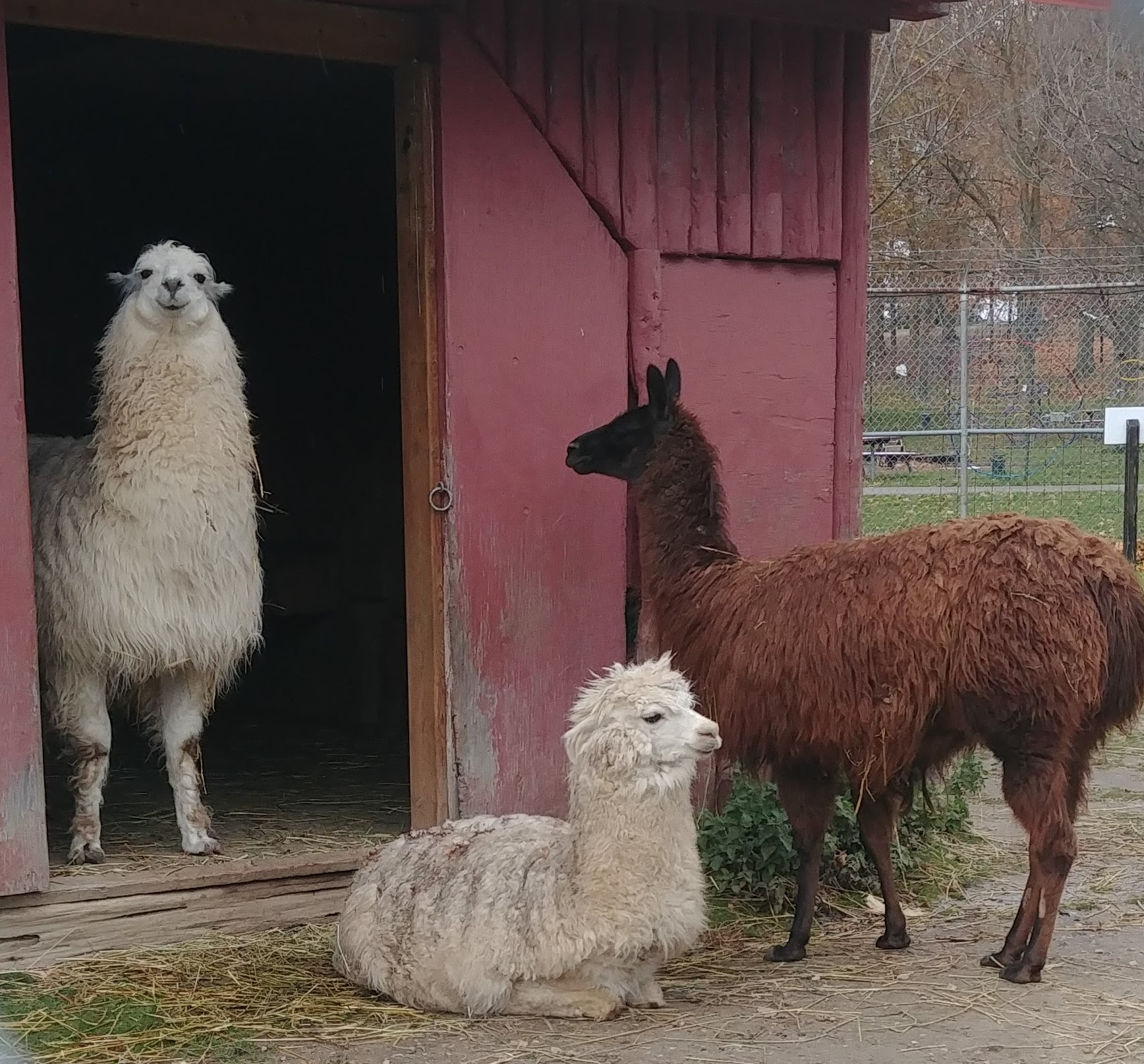
Alpacas

== Attractions ==
There are around 74 animal species on view (2026), and the centre is open to the paying public, with attractions such as public talks, feeds and presentations, "Animal Adoptions", "Meet the Meerkats", "Junior Keeper for a Day", and "Tapir Time" experiences. They also offer educational visits for schools and animal-themed birthday parties for wildlife-loving youngsters.

The zoo is split into roughly geographical zones including the African zone, which houses species such as, naked mole-rats, crested porcupine and Malawi cichlids. The European and Domestic Zone houses reindeer, barn owls, and several traditional farm animal breeds such as berkshire pig and bagot goat.

In April 2016, visitors witnessed the opening of the new Australasian Zone which included species such as kangaroos, wallabies, potoroos, emus, galahs, and kookaburras.

In Easter 2017, the Madagascan Zone opened, which houses servals, ring tailed lemurs and a variety of reptiles.

In April 2018, the Americas Zone opened, featuring Brazilian tapirs, capybaras, macaws, greater rheas, marabou storks, and Jamaican boas.

In 2025 Tilgate Nature Centre rebranded as Tilgate Zoo to reflect the diversity of animals on display. In the same year, it achieved official BIAZA-accreditation (having been a member for many years). The zoo has come to specialise in species that are often overlooked and amongst the animals that are not often to be seen in zoos are the gundi (Ctenodactylus gundi), the greater vasa parrot (Coracopsis vasa), the marabou stork (Leptoptilos crumenifer), the yellow-faced parrot (Alipiopsitta xanthops), the yellow-spotted tree toad (Rentapia flavomaculata) and the peach-throated monitor (Varanus jobiensis).

== Conservation ==
Many endangered species are kept at Tilgate Zoo, which has taken on an important role in conservation - primarily through its comprehensive conservation education department. Tilgate Zoo maintains breeding groups of several species that are part of wider conservation efforts and regularly exchanges animals with other zoos to maintain genetic health. Some of the more conservationally important species include Northern bald ibis, Scottish wild cat, Andean condor and radiated tortoises.

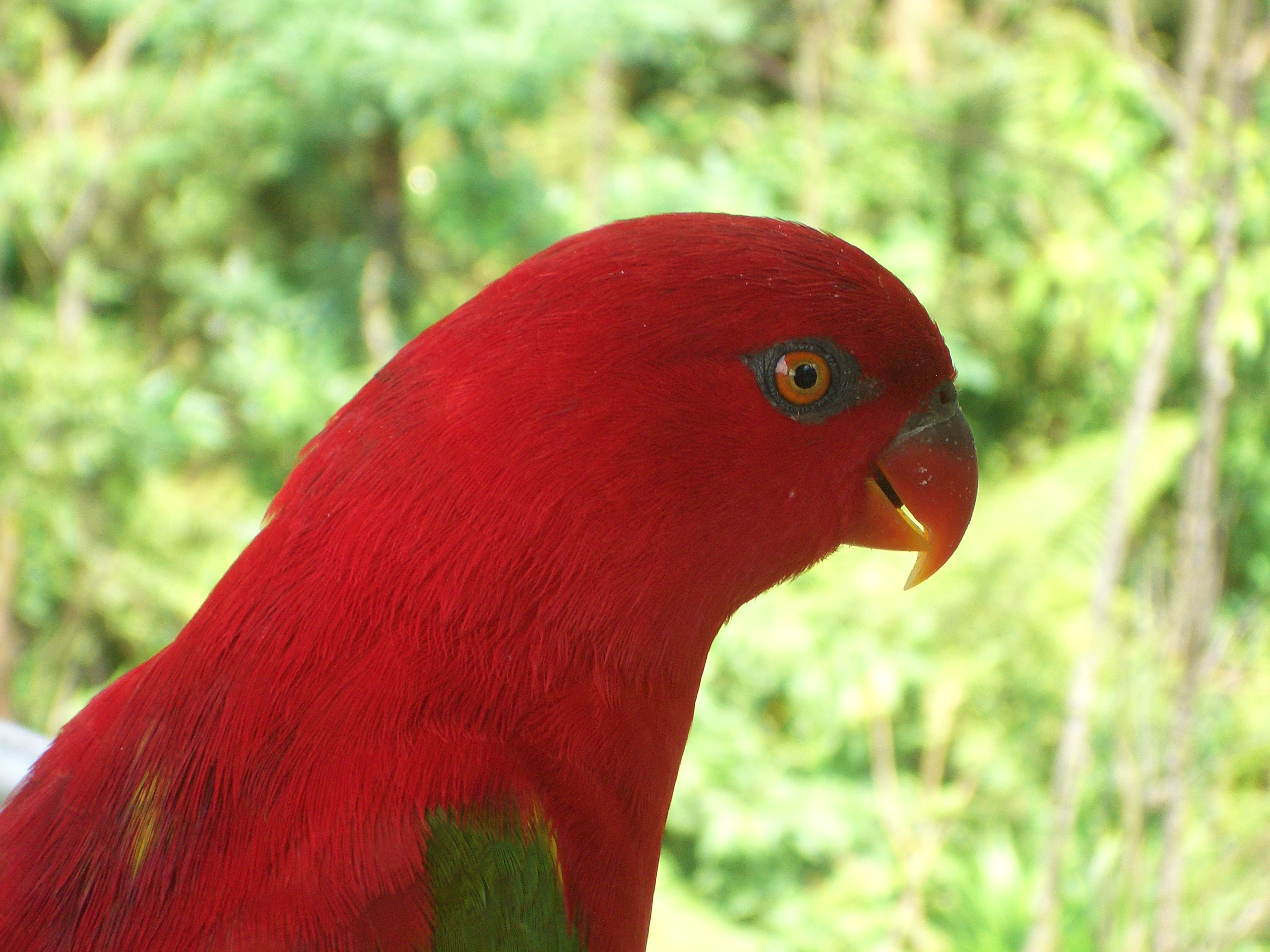
Chattering lory

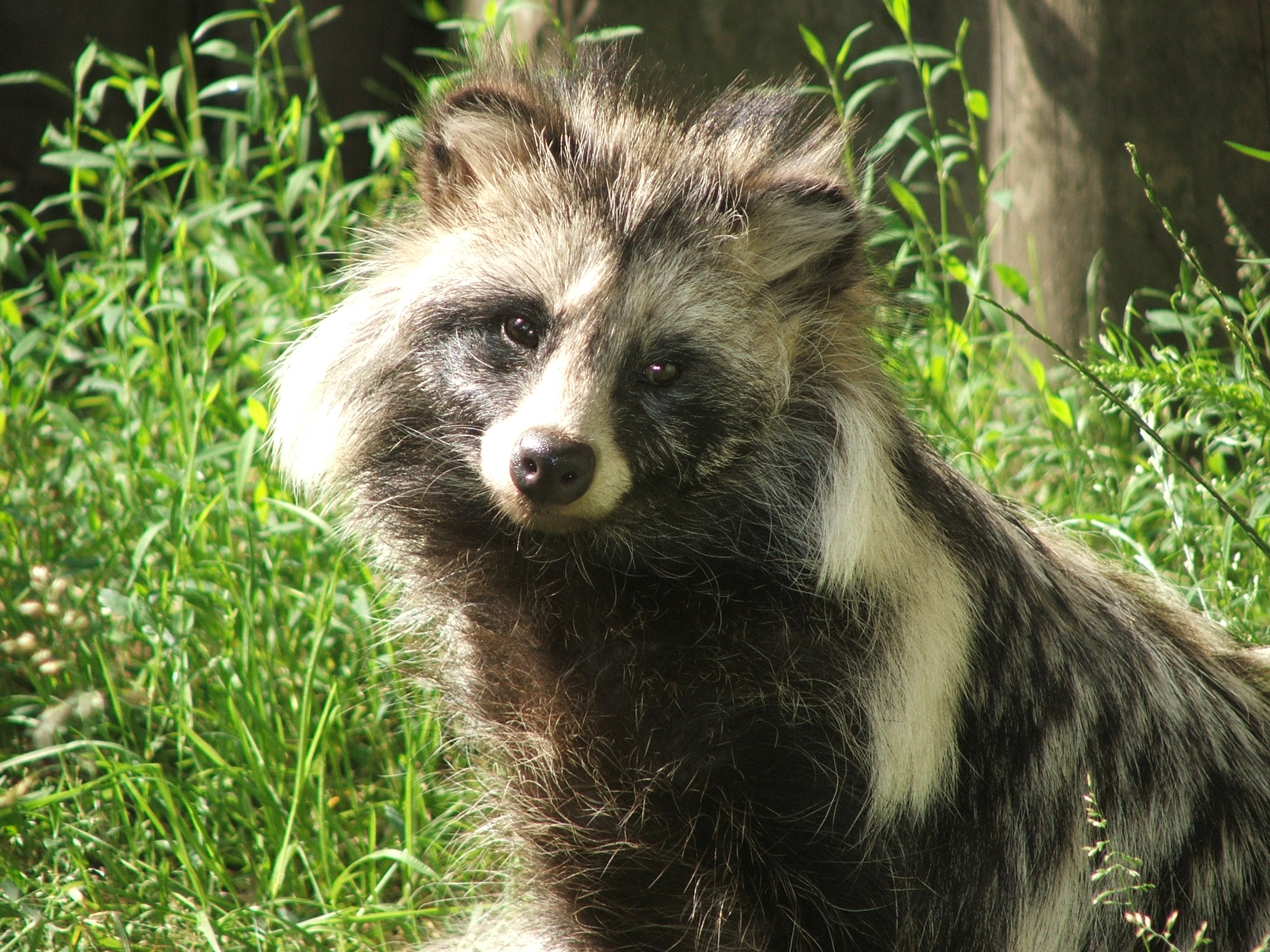
Raccoon Dogs from East Asia

== Awards ==
In 2020, Tilgate Nature Centre received a Gold Star Award (Switch To A Reusable) for Sustainability and Zoostainability, from the British and Irish Association of Zoos and Aquariums (BIAZA).

In 2021, a ranking of zoos in the United Kingdom by Parkdean Resorts placed Tilgate Nature Centre in first place.
