= John Nix =

John Nix may refer to:

- John Nix (American football)
- John Nix (Australian footballer)
- John Ashburner Nix, English businessman and politician
- John Nix (Ozark), a character from Ozark
