= Ashburner family =

Administrators in British-ruled India

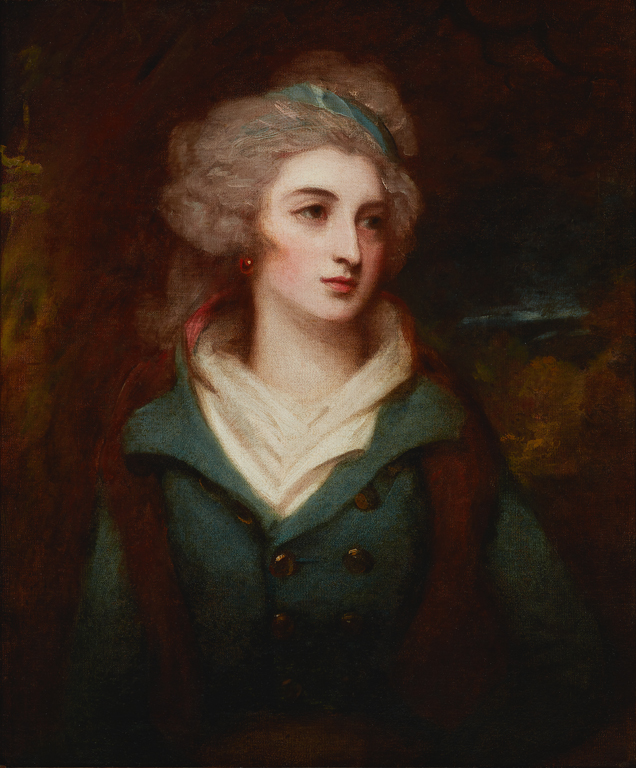
- Miss Grace Ashburner (1774–1812), 1792, painted by George Romney
- Country: England
- Current region: Bombay Presidency, British India
- Founder: William Ashburner (1737–1793)
- Titles: British East India Company administrators and merchants
- Members: William Ashburner (1737–1793); Luke Ashburner (1772–1844); George Ashburner (1810–1869)
- Estates: Tilgate House, Crawley

The Ashburner family is an English gentry family whose members were prominent as merchants and administrators in British-ruled India during the 18th and 19th centuries, especially during Company rule in India (1757–1858). The family's history is closely linked to the British East India Company and their activities in the Bombay (Mumbai) area.

William Ashburner (1737–1793), originally from Dalton-in-Furness, established the family in India, and was in charge of the East India Company's factory in Tellicherry before he moved to the same position in Bombay. His son Luke Ashburner (1772–1844) became the head of the Bombay Presidency. His granddaughter Sarah married William Erasmus Darwin, the son of Charles Darwin. George Ashburner (1810–1869), a son of Luke Ashburner, bought the estate Tilgate House in Crawley; his only daughter Sarah married banker John Hennings Nix, and among their descendants were Alexander Nix, whose full name is Ashburner Nix.

Grace Ashburner (1774–1812), daughter of William Ashburner, was involved in a love triangle. She married Samuel Boddington in 1792, then eloped in 1797 with his cousin Benjamin Boddington, the son of Thomas Boddington. After a court case which awarded £10,000 to Samuel, the couple divorced and Grace married Benjamin in 1798. They had seven children together before she died in 1812, aged 37. Benjamin lived another 41 years and never remarried.
