= Grattons Park =

Nature reserve in West Sussex, England

Coordinates: 51.127°N 0.159°W

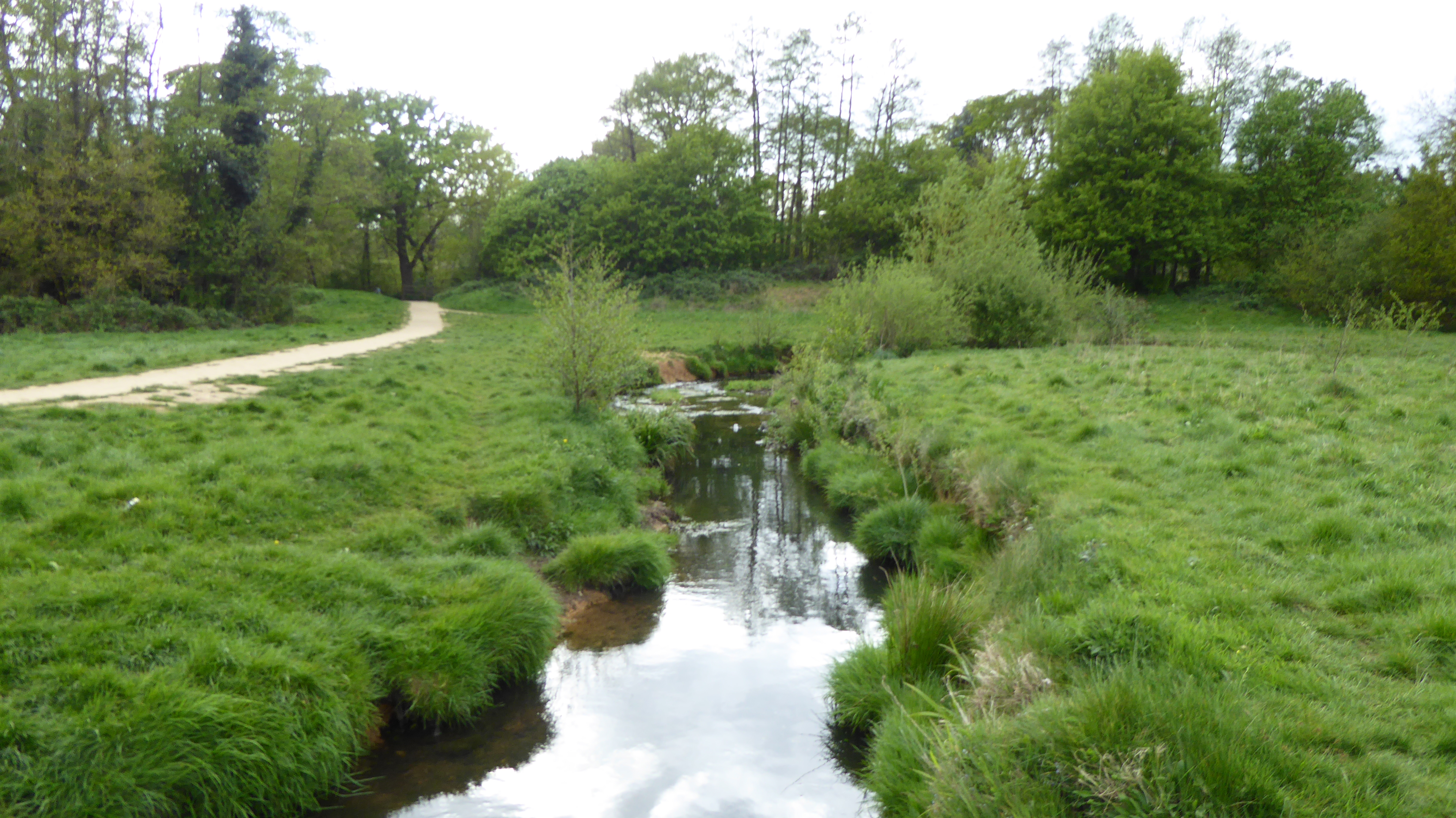
- Interactive map of Grattons Park
- Type: Local Nature Reserve
- Location: Crawley, West Sussex
- OS grid: TQ 289 380
- Area: 7.7 hectares (19 acres)
- Manager: Crawley Borough Council and Gatwick Greenspace Partnership

Grattons Park is a 7.7-hectare (19-acre) Local Nature Reserve in Crawley in West Sussex, England. It is owned by Crawley Borough Council and managed by the council and the Gatwick Greenspace Partnership.

Gatwick Stream runs through this park and other habitats are broadleaved woodland and grassland. Flora include lesser celandine and wild daffodils, while there are birds such as Eurasian treecreepers, great spotted woodpecker and long-tailed tits.

The park can be accessed from St Mary's Drive.
