= Tilgate Lake =

- Location within England
- Location: Tilgate Park, Crawley, West Sussex, England
- Coordinates: 51.095°N 0.175°W
- Type: lake

Tilgate Lake is the biggest of three lakes at Tilgate Park, and remains a popular water activity centre and tourist attraction in Crawley, West Sussex.Tilgate Lake has a wide variety of outdoor activities open to the general public, such as archery, canoeing, fishing, kayaking, mountain biking, raft building, rowing, running, sailing, standup paddleboarding, Open water swimming, team building, navigational challenges, tree climbing and zip trekking.

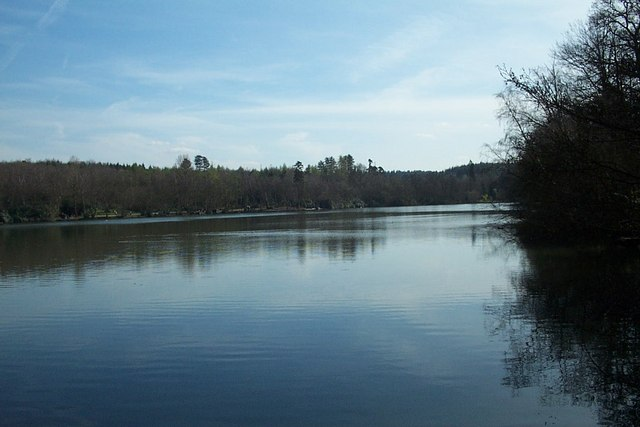
Tilgate lake on 6 April 2007 - Attribution: Elliott Simpson

== Tilgate Lake Dam Project 2011 ==
As part of the Upper Mole Flood Alleviation Scheme, the raising of the dam at Tilgate Lake was completed in 2011, to provide additional flood storage, protecting hundreds of homes vulnerable to flooding in Furnace Green, Pound Hill, Three Bridges, Tinsley Green and Horley.

== Tilgate Park Watersports Centre ==
Crawley Borough Council have created a water sports activity centre at the lake in Tilgate Park as a central feature of Crawley. activities available at Tilgate Watersports are: Bike Hire, Canoeing Courses, Boat Hire, Angling Membership, Boat & Board Membership, Open Water Swimming and Orienteering.

== Boating and sailing ==
Available for hire (2019) are rowing boats, kayaks, canoes, stand up paddle boards and mountain bikes.

Sailing boats were formerly available to hire from 'Dynamic adventures' but ceased in 2017, for Laser Pico's, Toppers, Optimists and a Wayfarer for holders of a RYA level 2 or above qualification.

== Mountain biking ==
A variety of forest trails have been established for both beginners and experienced riders through Tilgate Forest, under the banner of the British Schools Cycling Association (BSCA).

== Go Ape ==
Go Ape is tree climbing and zip trekking adventure park constructed in the tree tops of Tilgate Park. The course is constructed of rope ladders, zip-lines, rope bridges, trapezes and swings and is located above the lake near to the former "Inn on the park" (Now Smith & Western).

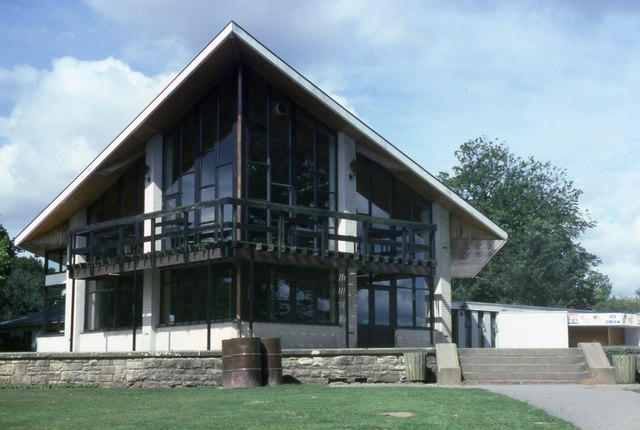
The Inn in the Park, Tilgate Park, Crawley (1986) - Attribution: Barry Shimmon

== Park Run ==
A 5K (five kilometre) park run takes place every week in which part of the course circumnavigates the whole of Tilgate Lake, to Titmus Lake, back to Tilgate Lake. Around 400 runners take part in the run each week, and the event has been in progress since 9 June 2013.

The record fastest times run by a male have been Neil Boniface in 15 minutes 39 seconds on 21 Sept 2013, Nick Duggan 15 minutes 38 seconds on 26 July 2014. Neil Boniface again in 15 minutes 32 seconds on 21 June 2014, and then by James Westlake of 15 minutes and 31 seconds on 15 July 2017, the best ever time was run by James Westlake on 14 April 2018, and is the current record (to 2020) of 15 minutes and 13 seconds.

In the ladies, Fiona Clark set the pace with 18 minutes 14 seconds on 16 June 2012, which was beaten by Hannah Brooks setting the best ever ladies time (to 2020) of 17 minutes 50 seconds on 29 September 2012. This time was run close twice by Julie Briggs on 1 June 2013 and 21 June 2014 recording 18 minutes and 6 seconds on both occasions.

In nearly 10 years since its beginning in June 2013 (to March 25, 2023), there have been 498 events, an average 394 runners per week. 18,704 participants, each finishing an average of 10.5 runs each, 196,347 finishes in total.

== Angling ==
This is a day ticket water with tickets available form Crawley Borough Council with many fish species available to be caught at Tilgate lake, including carp, pike to over 30 lb, tench and bronze bream to 7 lb, perch, crucian carp, roach and rudd. The largest known carp successfully landed at Tilgate was 34lb 8oz caught by Clive Sharpe in 2006. The largest known pike ever captured from Tilgate was 32lb 8oz caught by C.Voss in 1986. The largest known tench on record is a fine 6lb 8oz specimen landed by Nick Ardley in 2006.

== Swimming ==
Tilgate lake is recognised as an official NOWCA venue for open water swimming. Open water swimming vents are still organised by the councils appointed hosts: Tilgate Park water Sports, in 2020 an event named the Aquathon, for which 'Race 1' is a 500 metre swim + a 5,000 meter run, and 'Race 2' is a 1000 metre swim + a 10,000 meter run. All swimmers compulsorily wear a NOWCA Safety Wristband when they swim, which is scanned on entering and exiting the lake for safety reasons, and recording time and distance.

== See also ==
- Tilgate Park
