= Tilgate Forest =

Nature reserve in West Sussex, England

Coordinates: 51.102°N 0.163°W

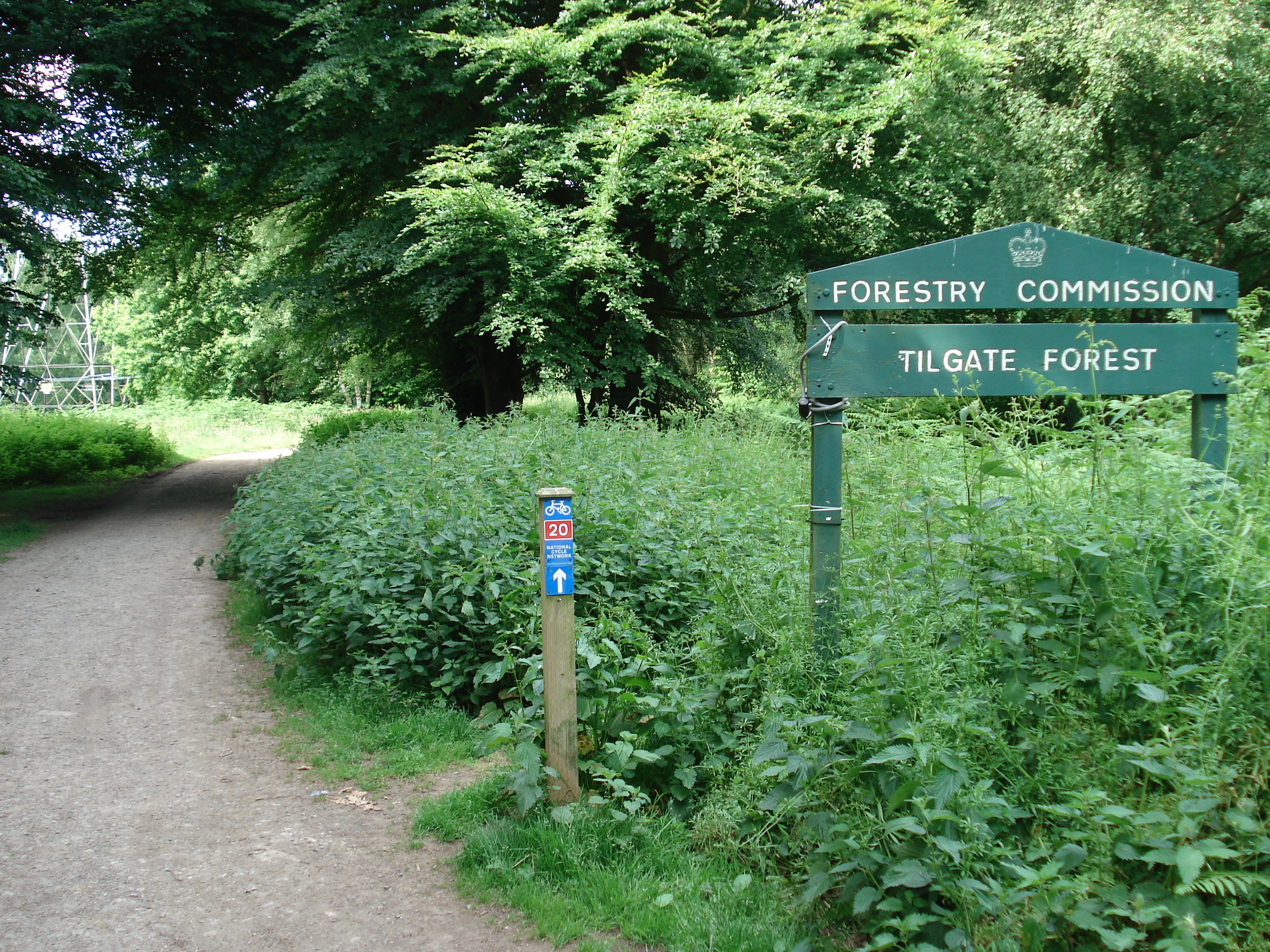
- Interactive map of Tilgate Forest
- Type: Local Nature Reserve
- Location: Crawley, West Sussex
- OS grid: TQ 287 352
- Area: 6.9 hectares (17 acres)
- Manager: Crawley Borough Council

Tilgate Forest is a 6.9-hectare (17-acre) Local Nature Reserve in Crawley in West Sussex. It is owned and managed by Crawley Borough Council and is part of Tilgate Park.

This site has woods, tall herb and fern, and heathland. The most common trees in areas of natural woodland are birch, oak and hazel, while plantations are mainly Scots pine, red oak, western hemlock and beech.
