= John Ashburner Nix =

English businessman, politician and barrister

John Ashburner Nix (1 July 1866 – 9 May 1927) was an English businessman, estate owner, Conservative Party (UK) politician and barrister who served as High Sheriff of Sussex in 1911.

He was the son of John Hennings Nix, one of the partners in the London bank Fuller, Banbury, Nix & Co, and Sarah Ashburner, a wealthy heiress born in Calcutta (now Kolkata), India whose father George Ashburner (1810–1869), originally from Bombay (now Mumbai), had made a fortune as a merchant in India and at the end of his life bought Tilgate House, a 2,185-acre estate in Crawley, Sussex. Tilgate House was inherited by Sarah Nix, an only child, and following her death the estate was owned by John Ashburner Nix from 1904 until his death in 1927; the estate was then inherited by his brother Charles Nix. He served as a second lieutenant in the Welch Regiment before studying law. He was a director of the mining company San Antonio de Esimilacho of Peru. He stood as a conservative candidate for Ashburton in the 1895 United Kingdom general election, but lost to incumbent Charles Seale-Hayne.
