= Maidenbower =

Neighbourhood of Crawley, West Sussex, England

Coordinates: 51.1040°N 0.1493°W

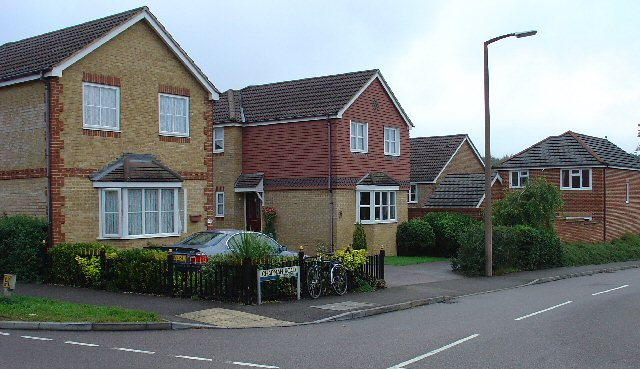

- Location within West Sussex
- Population: 8,070 (2001 census)
- OS grid reference: TQ295355
- District: Crawley
- Shire county: West Sussex
- Region: South East
- Country: England
- Sovereign state: United Kingdom
- Post town: Crawley
- Postcode district: RH10
- Dialling code: 01293
- Police: Sussex
- Fire: West Sussex
- Ambulance: South East Coast
- UK Parliament: Crawley
- Website: www.maidenbower.org.uk

Maidenbower is one of 14 neighbourhoods within the town of Crawley in West Sussex, England. Maidenbower is located in the south east corner of the town, bordering the M23 motorway. It is bordered by Pound Hill to the north and Furnace Green to the west across the railway line.

In 1986 Crawley Borough Council declared the farmland between the M23 and the London-Brighton railway line to be the 13th neighbourhood, named Maidenbower after one of the farms in the area. A consortium of builders was formed to develop the site which was to include community facilities and a new junction giving access to the M23.

By 2000 development was almost complete, although small areas of infill development continue.

The original 16th-century Frogshole farm building, unlike the adjoining Maidenbower farm that gave the area its name, remains as the public house for the neighbourhood. It was refurbished and opened in 1994. On 8 February 2007 it suffered a major fire. Frogshole Farm Pub re-opened in July 2008 after a major refurbishment.

A secondary school, the Oriel High School, has been built at Maidenbower under the Private Finance Initiative: a private company designed and built the school and is planned to provide facilities management for the next 25 years. West Sussex County Council provides all the educational services and staff. Maidenbower also has two infants schools and a large junior school.

There is a parade of shops and a community centre that provides daycare facilities for elderly people and people with disabilities. The Gatwick Stream runs through Maidenbower (formerly through Frogshole farm), past the back of the parade of shops and on to Three Bridges.

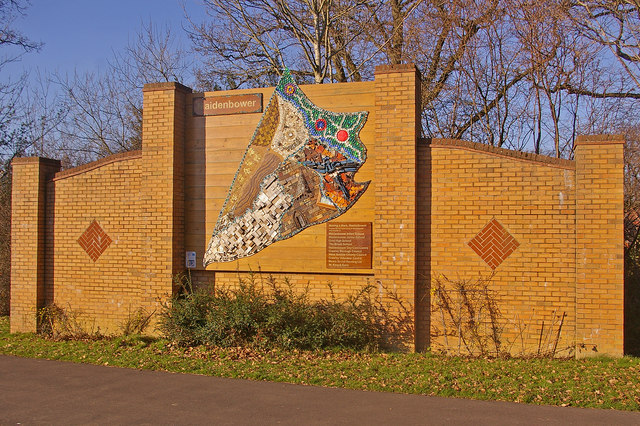
Maidenbower sign

In September 2006, close to one of the entrance roads to Maidenbower leading from the Balcombe Road, a large piece of public art was installed. A community project, it was created in five pieces by the four schools in the neighbourhood and one piece by the community. The pieces fit together like a giant jigsaw puzzle to form an outline representing a map of the neighbourhood. The streams that run through it create the joins between each of the pieces. The overall theme of the piece is the history and development of Maidenbower.
