= Furnace Green =

Neighbourhood of Crawley, West Sussex, England

Coordinates: 51.0998°N 0.159°W

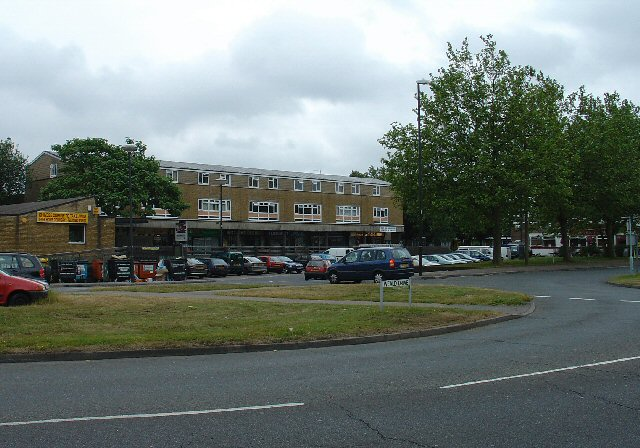
- Furnace Green Parade

- Location within West Sussex
- OS grid reference: TQ285355
- District: Crawley
- Shire county: West Sussex
- Region: South East
- Country: England
- Sovereign state: United Kingdom
- Post town: Crawley
- Postcode district: RH10
- Dialling code: 01293
- Police: Sussex
- Fire: West Sussex
- Ambulance: South East Coast
- UK Parliament: Crawley

Furnace Green is one of 14 neighbourhoods in Crawley in West Sussex, England, and a local government ward. Furnace Green is located to the east of the town centre. It is bordered by Tilgate to the south west, Three Bridges to the north and Maidenbower to the east (on the other side of the London-Brighton railway line and linked by two pedestrian tunnels).

The name Furnace Green is a reference to the iron smelting which is reputed to have taken place in Roman times - the local public house is the Charcoal Burner.

Like much of Crawley, the street naming is themed i.e. different areas are linked by associated names. There are racecourses – including Newmarket, Fontwell and others, forests - including Arden, Savernake and Epping, references to The Broads - including Waveney, Oulton, Norwich, and Yarmouth. There are also references to the iron industry - Coltash Road, Weald Drive, and the name Feroners Close also recalls the iron smelting.

== Crawley New Town ==
With the creation of Crawley New Town in 1947 the Tilgate East area was reserved for housing. It was proposed to use this area for around 1000 houses because of the expansion of Crawley. The area was renamed Furnace Green after a farm in the area. Work started in 1960 and carried on into the 1980s. Furnace Green had a population of 6737 in 1981.

== Features ==
There is a Nature Reserve and flood plain named Waterlea Meadow lying between Norwich Road and Waterlea. It is split by a meandering stream and has several ponds and footpaths. The stream is largely fed from the lake at Tilgate Park and in times of heavy rain often overflows onto the paths.

National Cycle Route 20 passes through Furnace Green, entering via Tilgate Drive from Three Bridges, to the north, at the point where it passes over the Horsham railway line and continuing south into Tilgate Forest en route for Brighton. Part of it also forms a section of the Avenue Verte (Greenway) long-distance cycling route from London to Paris which branches off towards East Grinstead via the Worth Way as part of NCR 21.

Crawley's only full scale theatre is located on the northern edge of Furnace Green. The Hawth takes its name from the large area of woodland to its rear.

== Health ==
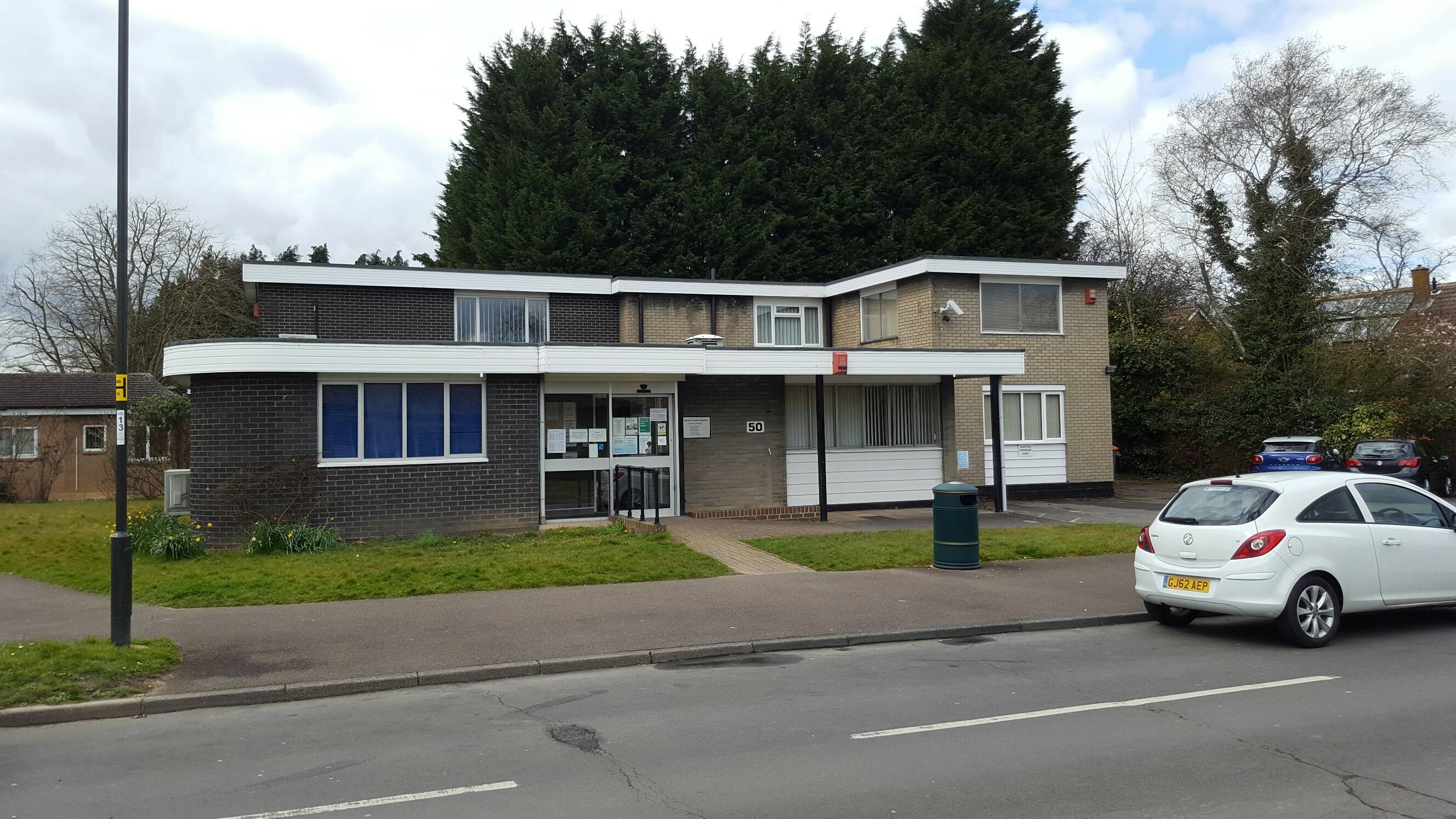
GP surgery in Furnace Green.

Primary Care in Furnace Green is served by the GP practice in The Glade.
