= Fuller, Banbury, Nix & Co =

British private bank

Fuller, Banbury, Nix & Co was a British private bank based in the City of London. It was founded in 1737 (288 years ago) in Lombard Street, London and operated under a succession of names reflecting its different partners until receiving its final name in 1881. One of the bank's partners, John Hennings Nix, was the second great-grandfather of Alexander Nix. The bank had a seat on the London Bankers' Clearing House. In 1891 the bank was acquired by Parr's Banking Co Ltd of Warrington, thus facilitating the bank's expansion into London. Through merger with London County & Westminster Bank in 1918, it became a constituent part of the modern NatWest.
