= Al-Madinah School =

Al-Madinah School may refer to:

- Al-Madinah School (Auckland), an Islamic state integrated area school in New Zealand
- Al-Madinah School, Derby, an Islamic faith free school in Derbyshire, England, since renamed as Zaytouna Primary School
- Al-Madinah School (New York City), a private Islamic faith school in New York, United States

== See also ==
- Al-Madina School
