= Broadfield House, Crawley =

Broadfield House
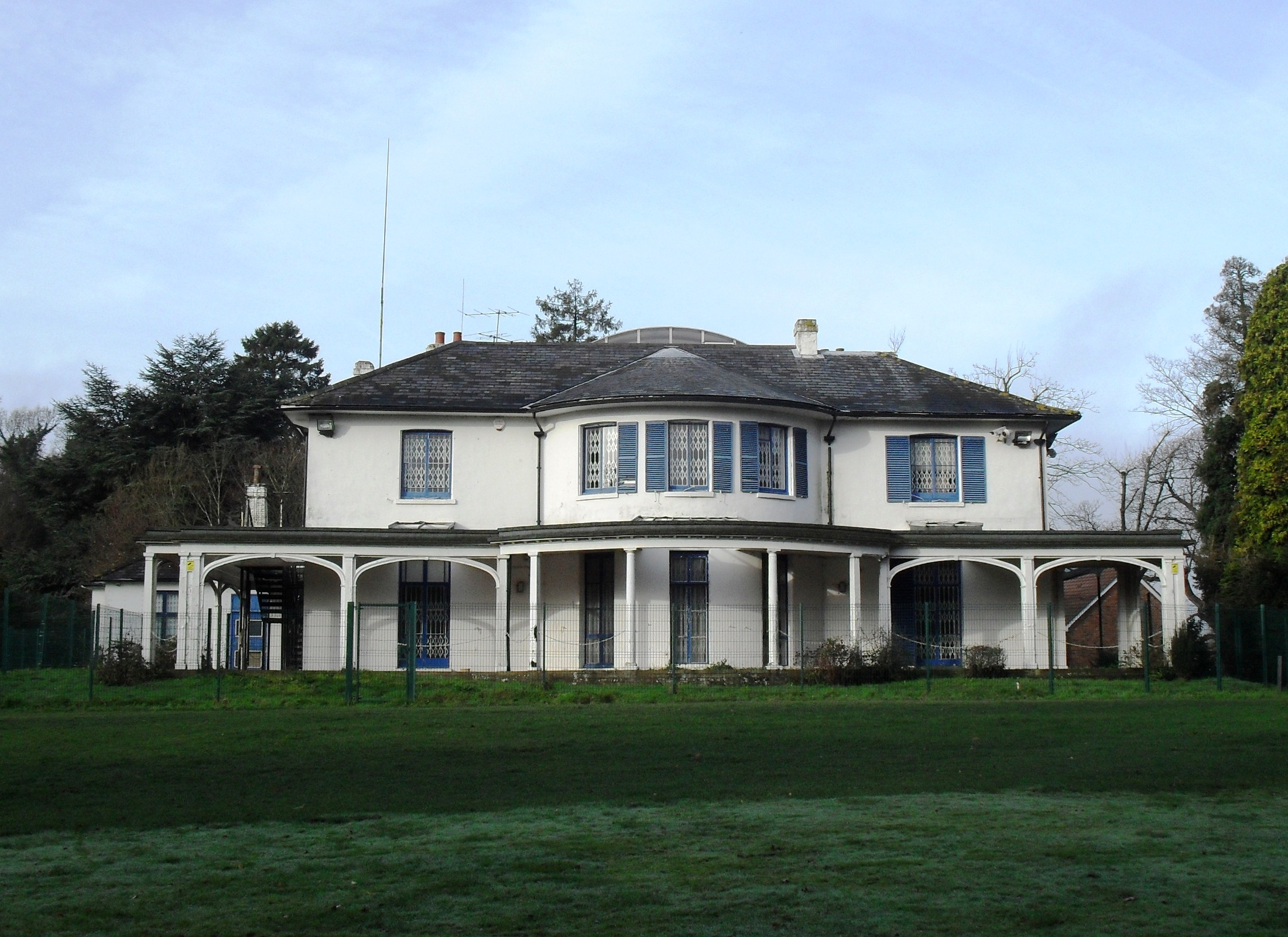
- The house from the south

- Location within Crawley
- 51.0964°N 0.1963°W
- Location: Brighton Road, Broadfield, Crawley, West Sussex RH11 9RZ, England

History
- Built: 1830

Listed Building – Grade II
- Official name: Broadfield House
- Designated: 21 June 1948
- Reference no.: 1298871

Broadfield House is a 19th-century villa-style house in the Broadfield neighbourhood of Crawley, a town and borough in West Sussex, England. Built in 1830 on the extensive land of the Tilgate Estate south of the small market town of Crawley, it was extended later in the 19th century and converted into a country club. After World War II, Crawley was designated a New Town and had to prepare for rapid, strictly planned growth. Broadfield House was chosen as the headquarters of the Crawley Development Corporation, and became the base where all the decisions that shaped Crawley's future were made. The house, which is still set in parkland, was refurbished and converted for use by Discovery School in 2011. It has been listed at Grade II by English Heritage for its architectural and historical importance.

== History ==
By the early 19th century, the market town of Crawley—founded six centuries earlier on the ancient London–Brighton road, about halfway between the two places—was thriving as a centre of population and commerce. The conversion of the road to a turnpike in the late 18th century had made both London and the fashionable seaside resort of Brighton much more accessible, and Crawley was the natural stopping-off point during the journey. Rich families and gentry who needed easy access to London began building estates and mansions in the Crawley area. One of the largest was the Tilgate Estate, which covered 2,185 acres (884 ha) of woodland and open land south of Crawley around the Brighton Road.

The main building on the estate was Tilgate Mansion, demolished in the 1950s, but in 1830 a villa-style house was built in the grounds just west of the Brighton Road. Broadfield House, which was decorated in the Greek Revival style inside, had bow-fronted façades and a columned verandah facing a lake. In the 1860s, another wing was added on the west side to provide a hall with a gallery. For many years, the building—large, surrounded by parkland and in a semi-rural setting—was used as a hotel and country club, as Crawley developed into a slowly growing, prosperous small town.

In 1945, as soon as World War II ended, government ministers and regional planning committees began to address the problem of London-centric living and employment. London was considered to be overcrowded and affected by slum development, made worse by extensive wartime damage. New Towns—planned, self-contained communities on sites in southeast England with plenty of room for expansion—were proposed. The Ministry of Town and Country Planning's southeast office reported that the Crawley area had suffered haphazard, poorly planned development since the estates were divided up and sold off in the early 20th century, and would therefore be an appropriate candidate for properly planned high-density development. Rapid progress was made: the decision to designate Crawley as a New Town (Britain's second) was made public on 12 July 1946, a preliminary planning committee was set up in September of that year, the New Towns Act 1946 was passed shortly afterwards to give the government authority to carry out the planning and building of New Towns, a 6,000-acre (2,400 ha) area around Crawley was legally defined in January 1947, and the Crawley Development Corporation was established in February 1947. Architect Sir Thomas Bennett was appointed chairman of the committee of financial officers, engineers, technicians, surveyors and other professionals.

The Development Corporation needed somewhere to work from. They did not want to build new offices; instead they waited for suitable premises to come up for sale in Crawley. For the first few months, they used temporary offices in London; but at the end of 1947, Broadfield House (still in use until then as a country club) was closed down and put up for sale. On 23 August 1948, the building reopened as the official headquarters of Crawley Development Corporation, which at that time had 90 employees. More buildings were constructed in the grounds, to house architects and engineers; Crawley-based building firm James Longley & Co. started work on the extension in March 1949 and finished a few months later.

Crawley Development Corporation was dissolved in 1964. It had successfully developed nine residential neighbourhoods, shopping and civic space and an industrial estate and increased Crawley's population from about 9,000 to 59,000 in 17 years. Broadfield House was converted into offices for Crawley Urban District Council, the local authority created in 1956 to govern the town. (This became Crawley Borough Council when the borough was incorporated in 1974.) In 1984, the building was acquired by newly formed FM radio station Radio Mercury, which began broadcasting to West Sussex and Surrey on 20 October of that year on 103.6.FM and later, on 102.7 FM. The radio station later relocated to offices on the Manor Royal industrial estate, and by 2008 the building was mostly vacant. At that time a planning application was lodged with Crawley Borough Council to convert the building into 12 flats. Permission was granted a few months later, however the development did not proceed. Broadfield House was restored in 2011, and was purchased and converted for use by Discovery New School at a cost of £1.9 million. Funding for the refurbishment of Broadfield House included grants from central government.

== Discovery New School ==
Discovery New School was a Montessori free school which opened in September 2011 at Broadfield House. It was one of the first free schools to open in England. The school closed in April 2014, following a series of inspection failures and withdrawal of its funding.

== Architecture ==
Broadfield House stands in Broadfield Park, a nature reserve with lakes and landscaped gardens. It is a stuccoed, bow-fronted building with two storeys. The Welsh slate roof has prominent eaves. A verandah supported on columns runs around the east and north sides and faces the lake in the park. The entrance is on the north face, but the main façade is on the east side, fronting a driveway leading to the Brighton Road. The 1860s single-storey extension is on the west side, and has three bays with round-arched windows. The north side also has three bays. Most windows in all parts of the building are jalousies.

== See also ==
- List of schools in Crawley, West Sussex
- Listed buildings in Crawley

== Bibliography ==
- Bastable, Roger (1983). Crawley: A Pictorial History. Chichester: Phillimore & Co. ISBN 0-85033-503-5.
- Bennett, Thomas P. (1949). New Towns Act 1946: Reports of the Aycliffe, Crawley, Harlow, Hatfield, Hemel Hempstead, Peterlee, Stevenage and Welwyn Garden City Development Corporations for period ending 31 March 1949. Crawley Development Corporation: Second Annual Report (Report). Her Majesty's Stationery Office.
- Goepel, J. (1980). The Development of Crawley. Crawley: Crawley Borough Council.
- Gray, Fred, ed. (1983). Crawley: Old Town, New Town. Paper No. 18 (Centre for Continuing Education, University of Sussex ed.). Falmer: University of Sussex. ISBN 0-904242-21-8.
- Gwynne, Peter (1990). A History of Crawley (1st ed.). Chichester: Phillimore & Co. ISBN 0-85033-718-6.
- Nairn, Ian; Pevsner, Nikolaus (1965). The Buildings of England: Sussex. Harmondsworth: Penguin Books. ISBN 0-14-071028-0.
