= Discovery New School =

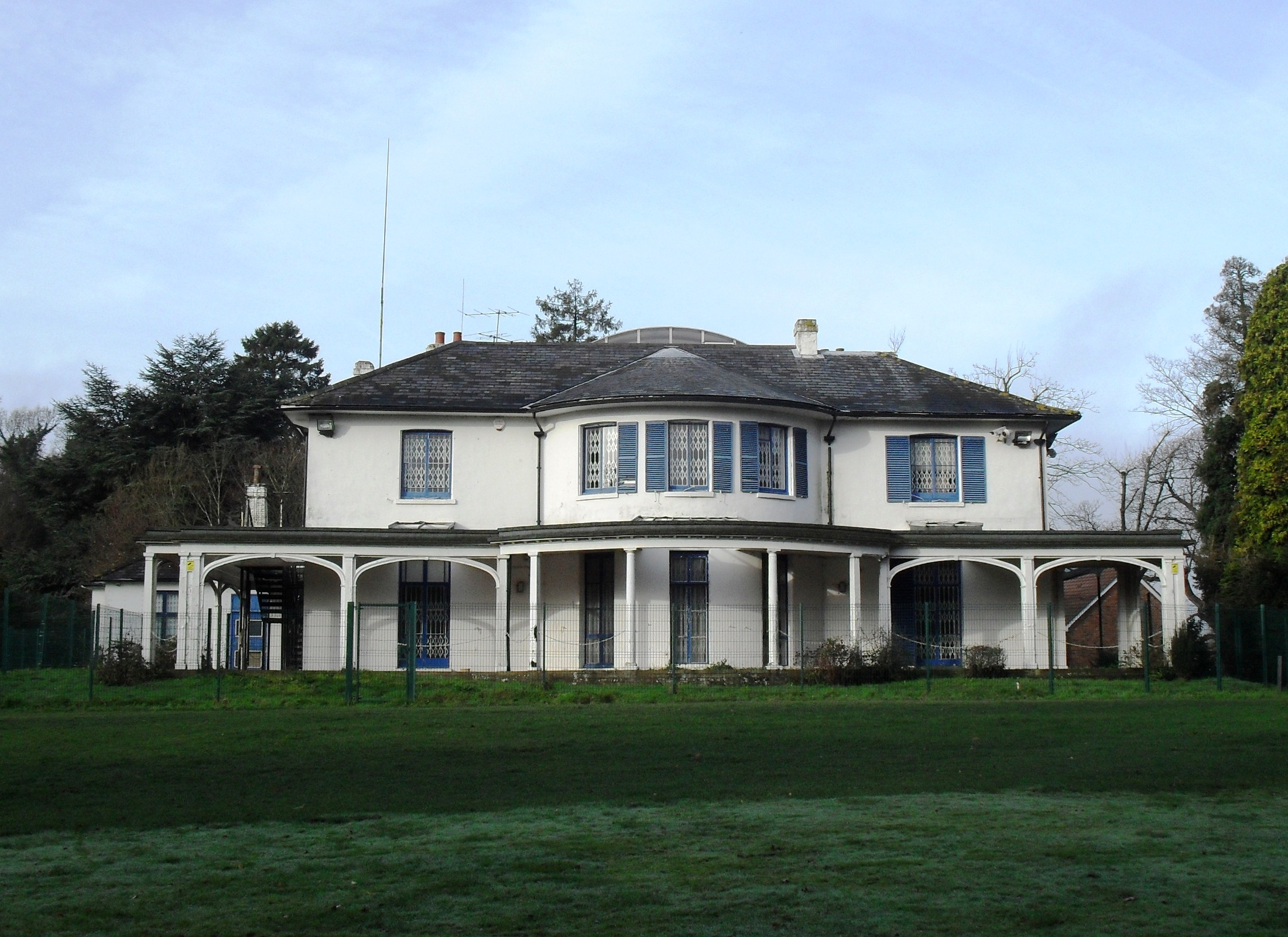
- Broadfield House viewed from the south.

Location
- Broadfield House; Brighton Road; Crawley, West Sussex, RH11 9RZ; England; 51.0964°N 0.1963°W

Information
- Type: Free school
- Motto: Discover-Enjoy-Achieve
- Religious affiliation: Christianity
- Established: November 2011
- Founders: Andrew Snowdon; Lindsey Snowdon
- Closed: 3 April 2014
- Department for Education URN: 137326 Tables
- Ofsted: Reports
- Chair of the Governing Body: Chris Cook
- Head teacher: Penny Crocker
- Staff: 7 teaching, 2 support {2013
- Gender: Coeducational
- Age: 4 to 10
- Enrolment: 48 (September 2013)
- Website: www.discoverynewschool.org

Discovery New School was a co-educational Montessori free school for pupils aged 4 to 10 located in Crawley, West Sussex. The school opened in September 2011 as one of the first free schools in the country and also the first Montessori free school. The school was funded directly by central government and had a planned intake of 16 pupils per year. Although the school adopted Montessori methods, the Montessori Schools Association (MSA) later said that they were refused permission to oversee the introduction of its teaching methods and had "warned the DfE of the school's likely failure" in 2010 before the school opened. Philip Bujak, chief executive of the MSA, said: "We were ignored completely." Martin Bradley, chairman of the MSA, said: "The Montessori Schools Association has had limited contact with the school from the start of the scheme. We suggested that they seek accreditation, but they did not."

While not formally affiliated with any religious organisation, Discovery New School followed an Anglican ethos and was one of four "faith schools" in the first batch of free schools approved by the education secretary, Michael Gove, along with a Hindu school in Leicester, a Christian primary school in Camden, North London, and a Jewish primary school in Mill Hill, North London.

The school closed to children for the last time on 3 April 2014, following a series of inspection failures and withdrawal of its funding.

== School building ==
Discovery New School was located in Broadfield House, a 19th-century villa-style house in the Broadfield neighbourhood of Crawley. Built in 1830 on the extensive land of the Tilgate Estate south of the town, it was extended later in the 19th century and converted into a country club. It was subsequently used as the headquarters of the Crawley Development Corporation. The house, which is still set in parkland, was refurbished and converted for use by the school in 2011, at a cost of £1.9 million. It has been listed at Grade II by English Heritage for its architectural and historical importance.

== Teacher qualifications ==
Discovery New School attracted media commentary when co-founder and school business director Andrew Snowdon revealed that he was "not obliged to employ qualified teachers" at the school and planned to employ teachers with a "mix of skills" including some with Qualified Teacher Status, some with Montessori training and some unqualified teachers and instructors. Alasdair Smith, of the Anti Academies Alliance, said: "The idea that free schools might not use qualified teachers would be very worrying for most parents because QTS is evidence that the teacher understands how to provide quality teaching and learning." Christine Blower, general secretary at the National Union of Teachers, said: "The NUT believes children deserve to be taught by qualified teachers. If the department decides free schools do not have to employ qualified teachers, it is a dereliction of their duties."

== Ofsted inspection ==
Following an inspection in May 2013 by government watchdog Ofsted (the Office for Standards in Education, Children's Services and Skills) Discovery New School was rated "inadequate" and inspectors warned that "too many pupils are in danger of leaving the school without being able to read and write properly." The report said: "The headteacher lacks the skills and knowledge to improve teaching... Too much teaching is inadequate, and the headteacher has an over-optimistic view of its quality." Inspectors also expressed concerns that too many children were being assessed as having special educational needs when "some of them simply need better teaching." (As of September 2013, out of 48 students 25% had SEN statements or were on School Action Plus.) It was the first free school to fail an Ofsted inspection, and also the first to be placed under special measures, a status applied to schools which fail to supply an acceptable level of education and lack the leadership capacity necessary to secure improvements. Schools under special measures are subject to regular, unannounced inspections.

A further Ofsted inspection in September 2013 led to head teacher and co-founder Lindsey Snowdon's suspension "after failing to create an adequate improvement plan for the school." The inspection report said: "It is essential that a credible professional is appointed to the headship without delay to provide the expert leadership necessary to remove the school from special measures" and that the draft 'statement of action' and improvement plan put forward by the head teacher and the business director were "not fit for purpose."

The school governors appointed Penny Crocker, a head teacher with specialist experience in improving failing schools, as interim head teacher on 9 October 2013.

=== Closure ===
In November 2013 Lord Nash, Parliamentary Under Secretary of State for Schools, wrote to the school governors that he was "extremely concerned about the quality of education children are receiving" and that "very little progress has been made since the school was placed in special measures." On 13 December 2013 the DfE announced: "Since the school was placed in special measures by Ofsted in May we have monitored progress closely. The trust has not provided evidence they are making the changes required. Lord Nash has today notified the trust that the department will terminate its funding agreement at the end of the [2014] spring term. We are now working with West Sussex County Council to ensure the children affected have suitable alternatives in place and their transition is as smooth as possible."

Lord Nash said: "We know from inspection evidence that teaching and learning is inadequate in DNS, and that there has been little or no improvement since Ofsted's judgement that the school required special measures in May. The number and nature of the actions and milestones to be achieved demonstrates that the staff are currently unable to deliver teaching and learning even at the most basic level with the consequence for the pupils of continued inadequate teaching for an unacceptable length of time. Further, the training implication for staff is enormous. It is difficult to see how they would be able to attend all the training listed and at the same time provide adequate teaching for the pupils."

The governors issued a statement expressing deep disappointment at the decision and said that they did not believe they had been "given enough time... to deliver improvements." Tristram Hunt, the shadow education secretary, said: "In his terrible rush to roll out the free school programme, David Cameron has abandoned high standards and basic safeguards and the pupils at the Discovery Free School have paid the price. David Cameron is damaging standards by allowing free schools to operate under a complete lack of local oversight, transparency and accountability and by allowing them to hire unqualified teachers."

The schools founders "were sacked" and DNS became the Government's first free school to be closed on 3 April 2014.

== See also ==
- Al-Madinah School, Derby, a free school marked by allegations of financial irregularities, discrimination, and nepotism
- Kings Science Academy, a free school marked by allegations of financial irregularities
