= Dixons Allerton Academy =

Coordinates: 53°48′00.7″N 1°48′39.8″W

Location
- Rhodesway; Allerton; City of Bradford, West Yorkshire, BD8 0DH; England

Information
- Type: Academy
- Local authority: Bradford
- Department for Education URN: 135866 Tables
- Ofsted: Reports
- Principal: Danny Carr
- Gender: Coeducational
- Age: 3 to 19
- Enrolment: 2,375 as of October 2018
- Website: http://www.dixonsaa.com/

Dixons Allerton Academy (formerly Rhodesway Academy) is a coeducational all-through school and sixth form located in Allerton area of the City of Bradford, in the English county of West Yorkshire.

Previously a community school administered by Bradford City Council, Rhodesway School converted to academy status in September 2009 and was renamed Dixons Allerton Academy. The school is now part of the Dixons Academy Trust, which includes Dixons City Academy, Dixons Kings Academy, Dixons McMillan Academy, Dixons Trinity Academy and Dixons Sixth Form Academy

Dixons Allerton Academy offers GCSEs and BTECs as programmes of study for pupils, while students in the sixth form have the option to study from a range of A-levels and further BTECs.

== Notable former pupils ==
- Clayton Donaldson, footballer
- Dean Richards, former footballer
