= Dixons Kings Academy =

Location
- Northside Road; Bradford, West Yorkshire, BD7 2AN; England; 53.7910°N 1.7885°W

Information
- Type: Free school
- Motto: Integrity Diligence and Civility
- Established: September 2011
- Founder: Sajid Hussain Raza
- Department for Education URN: 137277 Tables
- Ofsted: Reports
- Chair of Governors: John Bowers
- Principal: Simon Gayle
- Gender: Mixed
- Age: 11 to 16
- Enrolment: 827 As of March 2020
- Capacity: 800
- Website: www.dixonska.com

Dixons Kings Academy is a mixed free school for pupils aged 11 to 16 located in Bradford, West Yorkshire, England. The school opened as the Kings Science Academy in September 2011 and was one of the first free schools to open in England. It cost £10,451,327 to build and, pays an annual rent of £296,000

The school was founded by Sajid Hussain Raza, the school's first principal, who was convicted of fraud in August 2016.

The school "comes closest to David Cameron's vision of what a free school should be." The school leases the land from Alan Lewis, vice-chairman of the Conservative Party. It is on a 20 year lease.

== History ==
The school was founded by Sajid Hussain Raza, the school's first principal, who was convicted of fraud in August 2016 after diverting £150,000 of Department of Education grants into his personal bank account, treating the Academy "like a family business employing his relatives there and, for at least the first 12 months, operating with no proper governance."

When it opened, London's The Independent said the school "comes closest to David Cameron's vision of what a free school should be." Kings Science Academy has a longer school day (8.00am–3.30pm) than most other schools, and the library remains open until 9.30pm "for those with no quiet space at home." Raza anticipated that eventually 80% of pupils would progress into the sixth form and higher education, and that "most of them" would go to the top 20 research-led universities known as the Russell Group.

One of the school's key supporters is Alan Lewis, vice-chairman of the Conservative Party and owner of the land on which the school stands. The school leases the land from Lewis at an annual cost of £296,000 for 20 years. The school is operated by trustees Kifsa Ltd. and wholly financed by central government through the Education Funding Agency. The current premises were completed in 2012 at a cost of £10.5 million.

=== Fraud by senior staff ===
External videos
- Whistleblower sounds the alarm about flagship free school in Bradford (25 October 2013). The 10-minute Newsnight report investigating financial irregularities at Kings Science Academy. BBC Newsnight Official channel. (Flash Video.)

Kings Science Academy was the subject of an investigation and report by BBC Television's Newsnight current affairs programme on 25 October 2013, following claims by a whistleblower alleging serious financial irregularities, nepotism and fraud. The investigation was launched when journalists obtained a leaked copy of a May 2013 draft report by the Department for Education's (DfE) Internal Audit Investigation Team (IAIT). The DfE subsequently published a "heavily redacted" version of the report. (Note: The report found that £86,335 of a £182,933 grant made to the school was "not used for its intended purposes", of which invoices totalling £59,560 "were not supported by any evidence of payments being made." Invoices totalling £10,800 had been "fabricated" while a further £26,775 had been overpaid against legitimate invoices. Two payments (£259.60 and £350) were spent on parties for staff, and £169 was spent buying new clothes for a teacher. The former vice chair of governors was paid for First class travel and one member of staff was paid for a duplicated rail travel expense claim of £162.50. The school trust also paid some staff members' rent and rental deposits and purchased furniture for their personal accommodation. The trust also claimed back National Insurance (NI) contributions for four members of staff, including the principal, but no record could be found of corresponding NI payments being made to HM Revenue and Customs. The report also raised questions about the school's recruitment policies and revealed that the founder Sajid Raza had employed his wife, appointed his brother to the board of governors, employed his sister as a senior teacher and his father as the school bus driver. Christine Blower, the general secretary of the National Union of Teachers (NUT), said: It is now apparent the DfE has been sitting on the report detailing financial irregularities at the Kings Science Academy since May and only released it today once it became clear the NUT had released to the press its own document outlining alleged financial irregularities at the school. The catalogue of irregularities in the management of the school's finances acknowledged in the DfE's investigation report is a disgrace. This makes it very clear that the DfE lacks the proper procedures to manage and oversee its free schools programme. Michael Gove is himself personally responsible for this position. The public can no longer have confidence in him or his education policies. Sajid Raza was arrested in January 2014 on suspicion of fraud and was fired by the school's governors in August 2014 following a disciplinary investigation. In August 2016, Raza and two other members of staff, Shabana Hussain and Daud Khan, were convicted on charges of defrauding the government out of £150,000. Crown Prosecutor Peter Mann said: "The defendants treated public money as their own, and when challenged, fabricated documents to cover their tracks... Far from being a model school, Raza treated the Academy like a family business employing his relatives there and, for at least the first 12 months, operating with no proper governance. His co-defendants were also drawn into this criminality. Hussain, Raza's sister, received unlawful payments, and Khan helped to falsify documentation." During the trial it emerged that Raza and Hussain had paid some of the grant money into their personal bank accounts. While Khan had received no money, "the fraud could not have taken place without his participation." Raza, who had 10 County Court judgments against him by August 2013 and was making a £10,000 per annum loss on his portfolio of rental properties, used some of the money to make mortgage repayments "to alleviate his own financial problems." He was sentenced to 5 years imprisonment. Khan received a 14-month sentence and Hussain 6 months.)

=== Ofsted judgments ===
Following the school's first inspection in February 2013 the Office for Standards in Education, Children's Services and Skills (Ofsted) classified the school as "requires improvement" with regard to achievement of pupils, quality of teaching, behaviour and safety of pupils, and leadership and management. Overall, the school was classified Grade 3 (Requires Improvement). (Note: Ofsted defines a school that requires improvement as "not yet a good school, but it is not Inadequate [Grade 4].)

The school joined the Dixons Academies Trust and was renamed Dixons Kings Academy in January 2015.

=== Classroom stabbing of teacher ===
On 11 June 2015, teacher Vincent Uzomah was stabbed in the stomach by a 14-year-old pupil during a lesson in the school. The attack was premeditated, and racially motivated because the boy, of Pakistani heritage, "hated being disciplined by a black man". In August 2015 he was convicted of the attack and sentenced to 11 years imprisonment for causing grievous bodily harm with intent.

== Dixons Academies Trust ==
The school is now part of the Dixons Academy Trust which includes this school, Dixons Allerton Academy, Dixons City Academy, Dixons McMillan Academy and Dixons Trinity Academy.

In March 2017 Ofsted judged the school outstanding in all areas.

== Notable alumni ==
- Junaid Ahmed Iqbal and Ibraham Iqbal, children associated with the Dawood family terrorist cell

== See also ==
- Discovery New School
