= Hyde Park Chapel =

Meeting house of The Church of Jesus Christ of Latter-day Saints in London

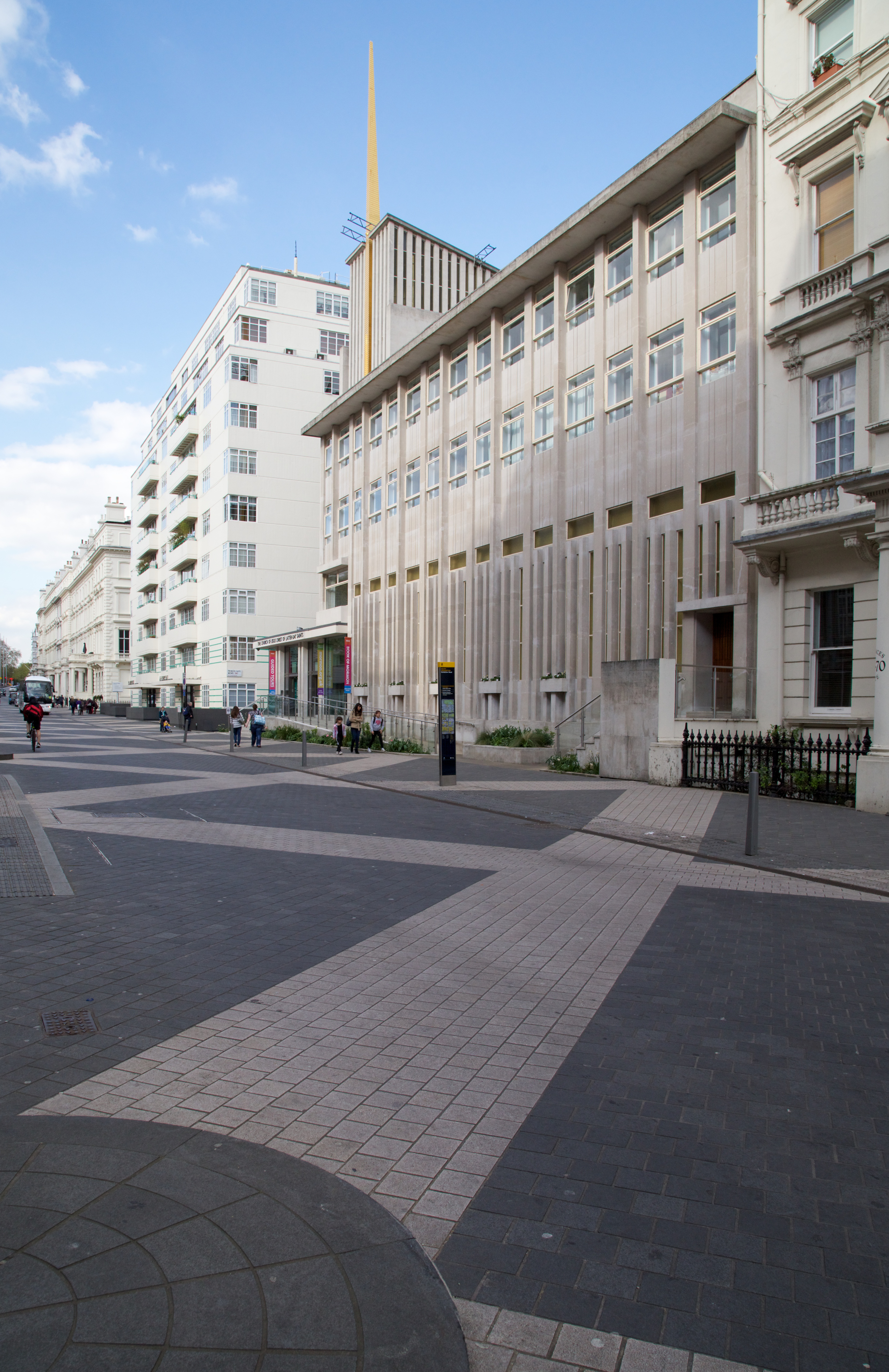
The Hyde Park Chapel in 2014

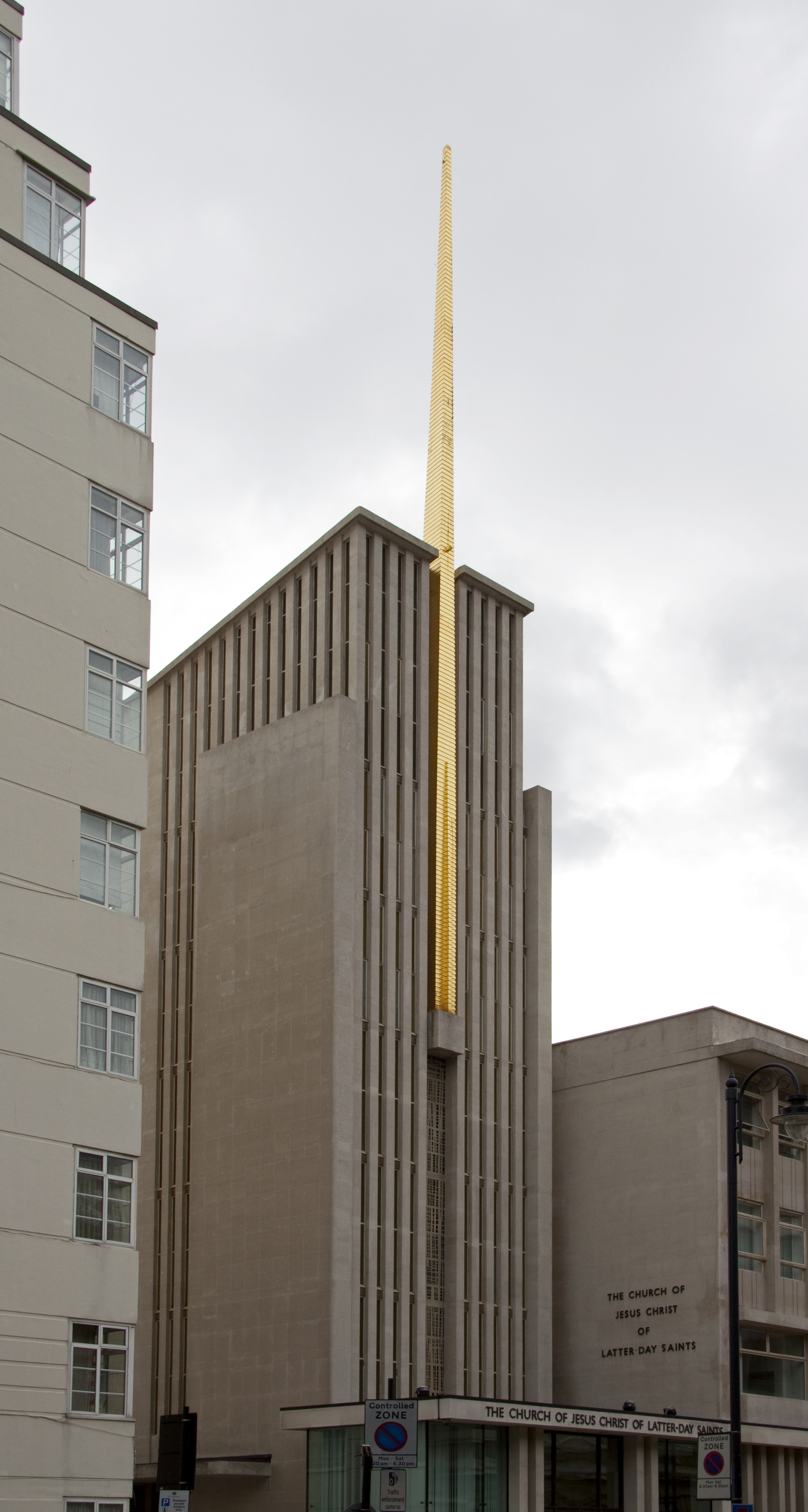
The distinctive spire of the chapel

The Hyde Park Chapel is a Meetinghouse of The Church of Jesus Christ of Latter-day Saints (LDS) in the South Kensington district of London.

== Design ==
The church is built from reinforced concrete with a Portland stone facade. The main building is four storeys in height with a six-storey tower. The west face of the tower has a 75-foot spire covered in gold leaf. A stained-glass window in the dalle de verre style designed by Pierre Fourmaintraux and made in the Whitefriars Studio is situated beneath the spire.

The architect was Thomas Bennett of T. P. Bennett and Son. The building contractors were McLaughlin and Harvey.

The building houses a family history center, and a visitor center in addition to the chapel. The ground floor is the site of the chapel and 'recreation' hall. The upper storeys of the building have a children's chapel, a meeting room for boy scouts and 18 classrooms.

The chapel featured the second concert organ to have been built in London since the Second World War.

A copy of Bertel Thorvaldsen's 1833 sculpture of the resurrected Jesus, Christus, is situated by the entrance and visible to passers-by.

=== Purpose of Life mural ===
Robert Oliver Skemp's 1964 mural The Purpose of Life, was displayed in the LDS pavilion Hall of the 1964 World's Fair in New York and was moved to the visitor centre of the Hyde Park Chapel after the fair ended. It had been commissioned by Elder Mark E. Petersen of the Quorum of the Twelve Apostles on behalf of the LDS church. It was subsequently installed on the ground floor of the Brigham Young University-Idaho in March 2015.

== History ==
In 1954 LDS President David O. McKay instructed the president of the British LDS mission, Clifton Kerr, to find a location for a central London chapel for the LDS church. The church subsequently acquired the bombsite of 64–68 Princes Gate in South Kensington. The previous building had been destroyed in The Blitz in July 1944. McKay dedicated the building on 26 February 1961. Shortly after its completion, the supervising architect of the LDS building committee in Salt Lake City attributed the 'spiralling construction costs' of contemporary LDS chapels to their 'contemporary' designs. The construction of the chapel cost £300,000 (equivalent to £8,434,896 in 2023) and took 16 months. It was refurbished and rededicated in 1995 by President Gordon B. Hinckley. The chapel was renovated prior to the 2012 Summer Olympics in London.

The building is home to the seven wards of the London England Hyde Park stake of the LDS church.
