= Zaytouna Primary School =

Location
- 500 London Road; Derby, Derbyshire, DE24 8WH; England; 52.9080°N 1.4639°W

Information
- Type: Free school
- Religious affiliation: Islam
- Established: 3 September 2012
- Trust: Transform Trust
- Department for Education URN: 138776 Tables
- Ofsted: Reports
- Headteacher: Amy Storer
- Gender: Coeducational
- Age: 4 to 11
- Enrolment: 352
- Website: https://www.zaytounaprimary.co.uk/

Zaytouna Primary School (formerly Al-Madinah School) is a coeducational Muslim faith based free school for pupils aged 4 to 11 located in Derby, Derbyshire, England.

== History ==
First opened in 2012 as an all-through (ages 4 to 16) school, the opening of the school caused controversy, with some in the Muslim community in Derby opposing the scheme.

However a high demand for places at the school was reported when enrolment started in 2012.

The idea of a segregated religious school was opposed by the Derby Campaign for Inclusive Education (DCIE) on the grounds that education should be inclusive with children from different backgrounds being educated together so they can make up their own minds as to what to believe as adults.

In the summer of 2013 the school required all female teachers, regardless of religious faith, to sign a contract stating that they would wear Islamic dress. The school prohibits teachers from bringing non-halal food onto school premises.

There were concerns that there may have been discrimination between boys and girls in the school, with the girls being required to sit at the back of the class.

It has also been alleged that the children who did not wish to partake in Islamic study were not offered the promised alternative, and that the school did not offer French or Spanish as alternatives for Arabic as it had promised.

The school was branded dysfunctional and inadequate by Ofsted for hiring inexperienced teachers, failing to put basic systems in place and relying on a temporary head to prevent its collapse.

A number of financial irregularities were revealed by Channel 4 based on a leaked Education Funding Agency report that highlight contracts given to companies that employed relatives of the governors, conflicts of interest and questionable expense payments.

By September 2013 the Department of Education was investigating the school. The school received an unscheduled Ofsted and Department of Education inspection on 1 and 2 October 2013. A few hours into the inspection, which was described as 'damning', interim principal Stuart Wilson closed the school due to unspecified "Health & Safety" concerns and claimed that it would be re-opened soon. It was then confirmed that the school would reopen on 7 October, which it did.

External videos
- Al-Madinah school 'dysfunctional' (17 October 2013). Channel 4 News coverage of Ofsted's critical inspection report. Channel 4 News Official channel. (Flash Video.)

Parliament pushed for the Ofsted and Department for Education reports to be made public as soon as possible due to the concerns. The National Union of Teachers (NUT) were sceptical of the school's explanation of the closure, and the Department for Education have confirmed an investigation.

The report was published on 17 October 2013 and rated the school as "inadequate" with regard to the achievement of pupils, the quality of teaching, the behaviour and safety of pupils, and the leadership and management of the school. Describing the school as "dysfunctional", Ofsted placed it under Special measures, a status applied to schools which fail to supply an acceptable level of education and lack the leadership capacity necessary to secure improvements.

In February 2014 Education Minister Lord Nash announced that secondary education at the school would cease in the summer of 2014.

The school was renamed Zaytouna Primary School in September 2017, and was taken over by the Transform Trust in September 2018.

== Enrollment ==
Zaytouna Primary School offers primary education to pupils aged 4 to 11 from the Derby area. Where the number of applications for admission to the school is greater than the number of places, 50% of places are given to Muslim pupils and the other 50% to non-Muslim pupils.

== See also ==
- Discovery New School
- Kings Science Academy
- Operation Trojan Horse, alleged plot in which Islamist school governors sought to exploit academy status
