= Crawley Development Corporation =

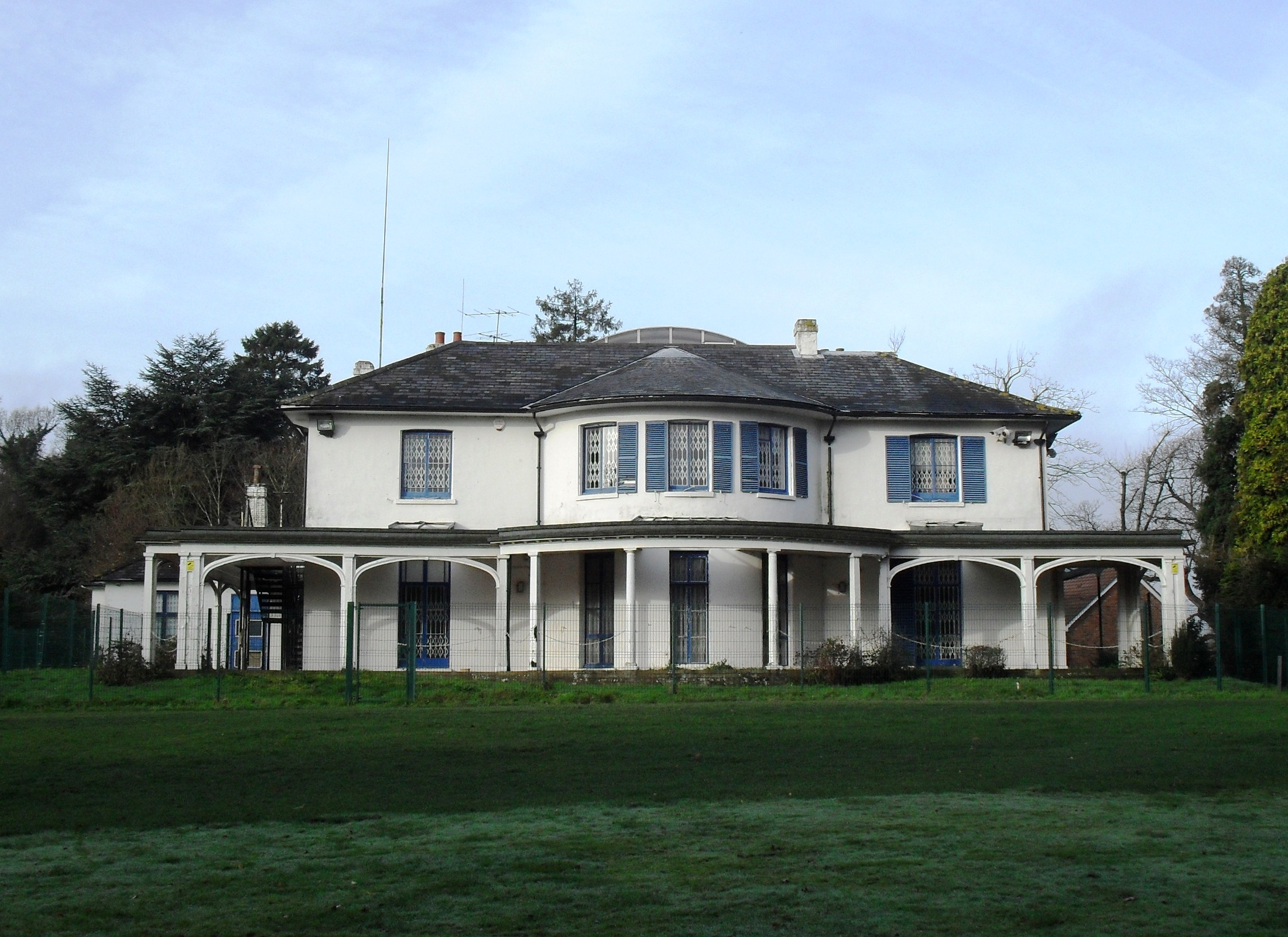
Crawley Development Corporation used Broadfield House, a 19th-century villa, as its headquarters

Crawley Development Corporation was set up in February 1947 by the Government of the United Kingdom to establish, administer and control the development of the New Town of Crawley in accordance with the New Towns Act 1946 (9 & 10 Geo. 6. c. 68). The Corporation had the task of growing the ancient Sussex market town of Crawley from a population of 9,000 to 40,000 by the early 1960s, expanding its commercial and industrial base and developing a balanced, socially cohesive community. A master plan supplied by planning consultant Anthony Minoprio would guide the Corporation's work. The "energy and enthusiasm" of its chairman Thomas Bennett helped it meet many of its targets early, and it was formally dissolved in 1962. Its assets passed to the Commission for New Towns in that year; they are now owned privately or by the local authority, Crawley Borough Council.

The Corporation was based at Broadfield House, a 19th-century villa in the south of the town. Professionals and specialists from many fields were employed: architects, engineers, designers, legal and financial experts were all involved during its 15-year existence. A committee headed by Bennett took overall charge. Wide-ranging powers were granted—from physically preparing the land to examining financial contracts—and in return the Corporation was expected to transform the 5,920-acre (2,400 ha) "designated area" into a viable regional centre and community.

Problems faced by the Development Corporation included labour and materials shortages, a lengthy legal battle against the designation order, the resignation of the original master plan designer, complaints from residents about its far-reaching powers (including some high-profile challenges), and the position of the designated area across the boundaries of several local authorities, making negotiations more complex. Nevertheless, the Corporation was able to drive the New Town's rapid postwar growth and transformation; population targets were regularly revised upwards because of Crawley's success in attracting people and jobs, and the town now houses 100,000 people.

== History ==
=== Background ===
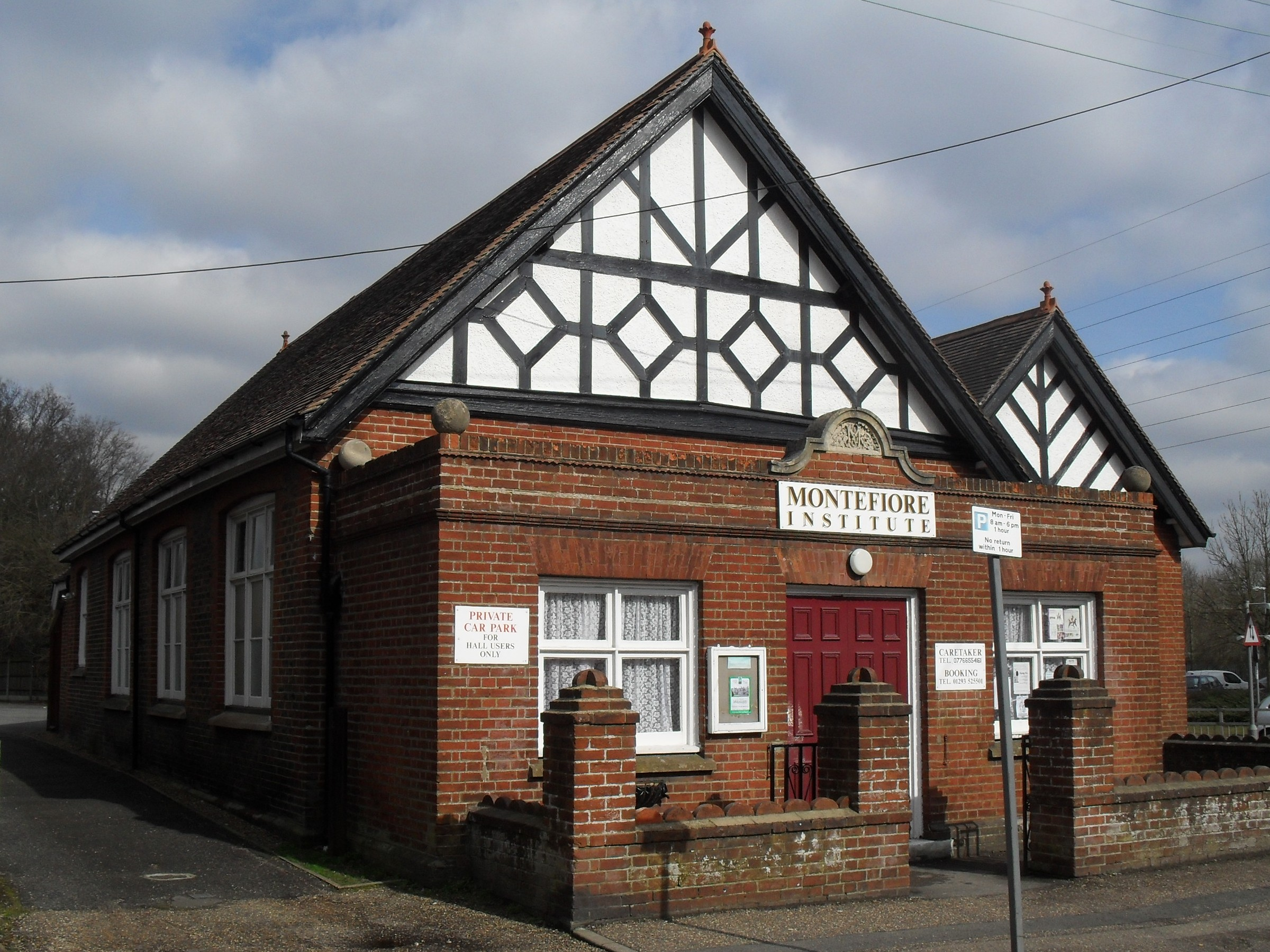
The public inquiry into Crawley's New Town designation took place at the Montefiore Institute in November 1946; meanwhile, the committee which became the Development Corporation had already been formed.

By the early 1930s, the market town of Crawley and the adjacent villages of Ifield and Three Bridges were beginning to merge, and low-quality ribbon development stretched into the surrounding countryside towards Tinsley Green and the new Gatwick Aerodrome, northwards along the London Road and west of Ifield towards Horsham. This was of great concern to West Sussex and East Sussex county councils, and the national government was also aware of the problem. After the Town and Country Planning Act 1932 extended the scope of urban planning in the United Kingdom, a group of people representing various local and wider interests began to meet regularly in Crawley with the aim of improving the area's future development. As their influence grew, they successfully argued for Crawley to be governed by a single local authority: until that time, 1945, the area was controlled by three county councils and three parish councils. Meanwhile, the national government was making several proposals which together paved the way for the concept of New Towns. The Barlow Commission (1940) argued for the mass movement of people and jobs from cities to new satellite towns; the Scott Committee (1941) specified more details about how such towns should develop; and the Uthwatt Committee (1942) discussed how land and buildings could be compulsorily purchased.

Patrick Abercrombie's Greater London Plan of 1944 proposed taking 1 1/2 million residents out of London. One third were to be rehoused in ten new towns in a ring about 25 miles (40 km) from the city. In 1945, Lord Reith and his committee described how these towns would be developed: they were intended to be "self-contained and balanced communities for work and living". Following the passing of the New Towns Act 1946 (9 & 10 Geo. 6. c. 68) in April of that year, sites had to be found: two locations south of London (Crowhurst and Holmwood, both in Surrey) were rejected, and the Minister of Town and Country Planning Lewis Silkin selected Crawley as the site for a "twin-centred town [... with] an eventual population of 30,000 to 40,000".

On 10 July 1946, Silkin met officers from the various local authorities that governed the Crawley area. He explained his choice of Crawley as a New Town; no objections were raised in the meeting, but the mood from some groups and members of the public was less enthusiastic and a public inquiry had to be held. The proceedings, on 4–6 November 1946 at Montefiore Hall in Three Bridges, held up the official New Town designation until 9 January 1947, and two further legal challenges meant no work could take place until December 1947.

=== Creation of the Corporation ===
In October 1946, Lewis Silkin set up an informal committee to run the affairs of the proposed Crawley New Town. In February 1947, shortly after the official designation of New Town status, the group was formalised and renamed Crawley Development Corporation. It had to "design, build and administer a self-contained industrial town of 50,000 within 15 years, and weld this on to the existing scattered haphazard development" around Ifield, Crawley and Three Bridges. It was permitted to compulsorily purchase any land or property within the 5,920-acre (2,400 ha) "designated area", employ any staff it needed to carry out professional, administrative and clerical duties, and subcontract building and other manual work if it preferred not to employ such workers directly. The national government would finance it as required through 60-year loans. In return, the Corporation would have to build residential, industrial, commercial, civic and service buildings and all the infrastructure needed for the new town: electricity (including street lighting), gas, water, drainage and sewerage, and new road connections. It would be responsible for all the houses it built, in terms of both maintenance and finance: it could provide subsidies and charge rents as it saw fit. Governance was outside the Corporation's remit: Crawley Urban District Council, created in 1956 to cover the whole of the designated area, was responsible for matters of local governance. Before the creation of this single local authority, parts of the New Town area were controlled by Horsham Rural District Council (in West Sussex), Cuckfield Rural District Council (East Sussex) and Dorking and Horley Rural District Council (Surrey).

When the Corporation was created in February 1947, its chairman was Sir Wilfred Lindsell. He asked town planner Thomas Wilfred Sharp to prepare a draft master plan, which he delivered on 1 March 1947. Within months, both men had left the Corporation: Lindsell was considered "not dynamic enough" by Lewis Silkin, and Sharp resigned shortly after submitting his plan and some additional research. Local historian Peter Gwynne described this as "an extraordinary decision [...] which was never properly explained". Anthony Minoprio was appointed as consultant planner instead; by June 1947 he had prepared a new draft plan (approved and published in December 1947) and Silkin had taken on a new chairman, Thomas Bennett. Also in 1947, the Corporation acquired Broadfield House. Originally a 19th-century villa in extensive grounds, the building was used as a country club until its closure in that year. The Corporation had already decided to operate temporarily from London while searching for suitable premises in Crawley, rather than building new offices. When the building came on the market in late 1947, the Corporation bought it, refitted it and on 23 August 1948 opened it as its headquarters. Ancillary buildings were put up in the grounds in mid-1949.

=== Crawley New Town develops ===
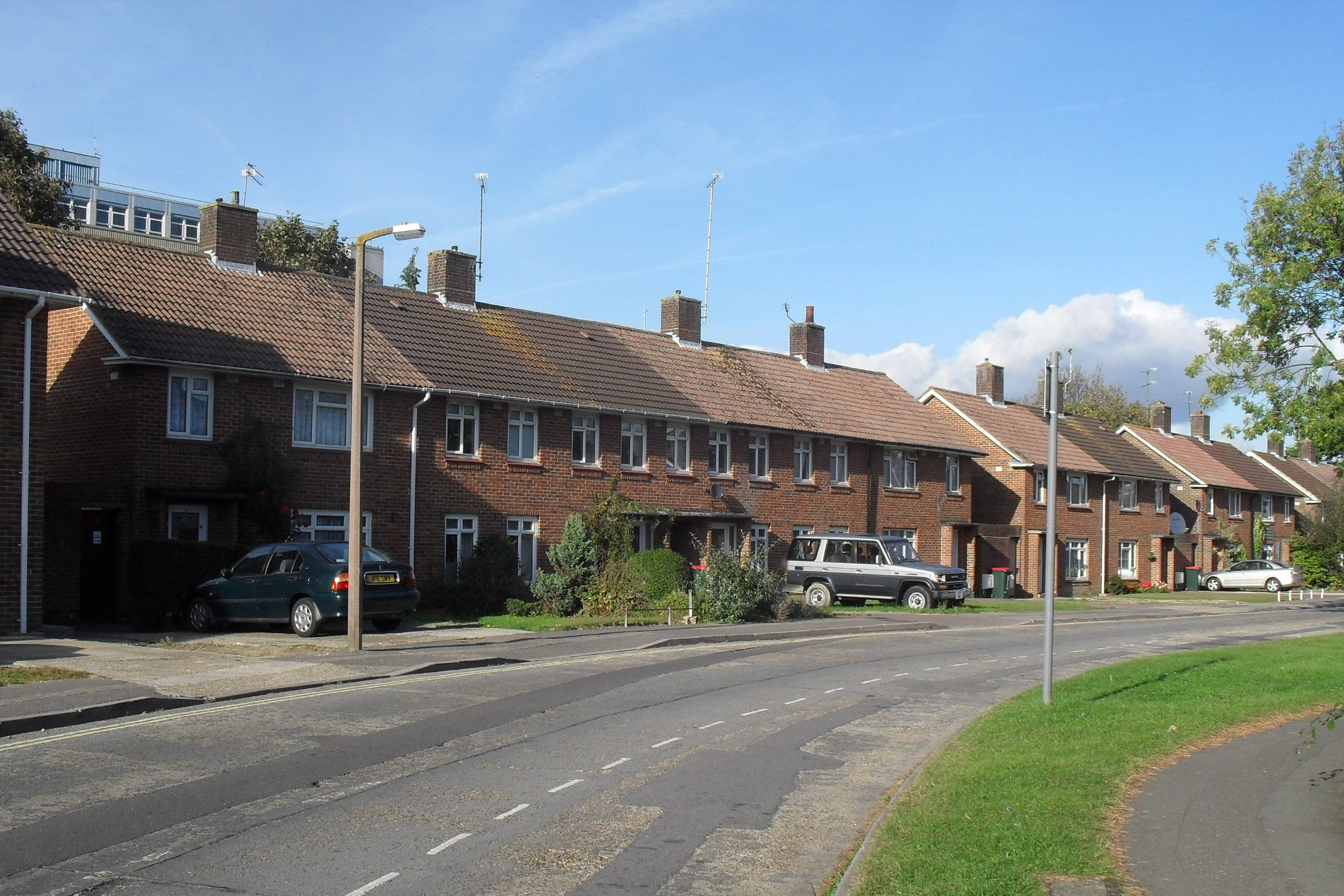
Smalls Mead in the West Green neighbourhood was the first residential street built by the Development Corporation.

Under Bennett's chairmanship, the Development Corporation consisted of about 90 employees led by a committee of unelected members: Bennett himself, Sir Edward Gillett, Caroline Haslett, Ernest Stanford, Lawrence Neal, E.W. Passold, D. Bolton, Mr Lewis and Alderman James Marshall. Each had a specialism: Bennett was an architect, Gillett a surveyor, and Lewis (a former Barclays Bank chairman) looked after the financial side; Marshall had been Mayor of Croydon, Bolton once led London County Council, and Stanford chaired Crawley Parish Council. Dame Caroline Haslett, educated locally, was a pioneering electrical engineer and writer, and was the British Electricity Authority's first female member. The technicians, surveyors, architects and other professionals employed by the Corporation were organised by Colonel C.A.C. Turner, its chief executive until 1959. Delays caused by materials shortages in the straitened postwar economy meant that the first two years of its existence were given over to planning, but work began in earnest in 1949. Minoprio updated his draft plan, and the Corporation signed off A Master Plan for Crawley New Town in early 1949. The new town's chief architect until May 1952, when he left to become City Architect of Birmingham, was Alwyn Sheppard Fidler.

Throughout 1948, planning took place for the industrial estate, the town centre and the first residential neighbourhood, West Green. Minoprio took charge of the detailed planning of the new town centre, to be based on the existing High Street, while responsibility for the other areas was devolved to Development Corporation staff. In the same year, work started on the sewerage system and New Town's industrial estate (later named Manor Royal), and the first residential street was built. The Corporation looked at bids from 11 companies for the contract to lay out and build Smalls Mead, a street of terraced houses near Crawley Hospital. Early problems included design mistakes in some of the houses, lack of accommodation for builders and inadequate supplies of materials (rationing was still in place, and New Towns received no preferential treatment), but the 34 houses, built by the Hoad and Taylor company for £45,220, were ready by the end of the year.

We had our dreams for the future and you smashed those dreams. You offer us a sum of money. Dreams are not bought with money, nor is their loss compensated by it.

— Daisy Warren, Crawley shopowner, in 1950

The Corporation "intended to preserve the character of the High Street as far as possible" when building the new town centre. A 100-acre (40 ha) site was designated, consisting of open fields off the Three Bridges Road and the ancient High Street at the west end. Nevertheless, it caused controversy and faced challenges to its plans. It used its compulsory purchase powers to buy 76 shops and other buildings on and near the High Street in 1950 and immediately leased them back to their previous owners for 21 years. This bred insecurity, as business owners could be forced to leave at short notice; some compulsorily purchased shops were, however, never demolished. An impassioned statement to the Corporation by Daisy Warren, a hardware shop owner, was widely publicised at the time. Meanwhile, the compensation policy for farmland bought by the Corporation and reclassified as building land was causing frustration among landowners. The government-sanctioned policy allowed the Corporation to profit from its acquisitions. When land was bought east of the High Street in preparation for the new town centre, farmer James Lee took direct action: he built his activist profile by occupying and being evicted from several farms in quick succession, then he became nationally famous for driving his tractor from Crawley to Buckingham Palace as a protest at being "cheated" by the Corporation.

== Provision of housing by the Corporation ==
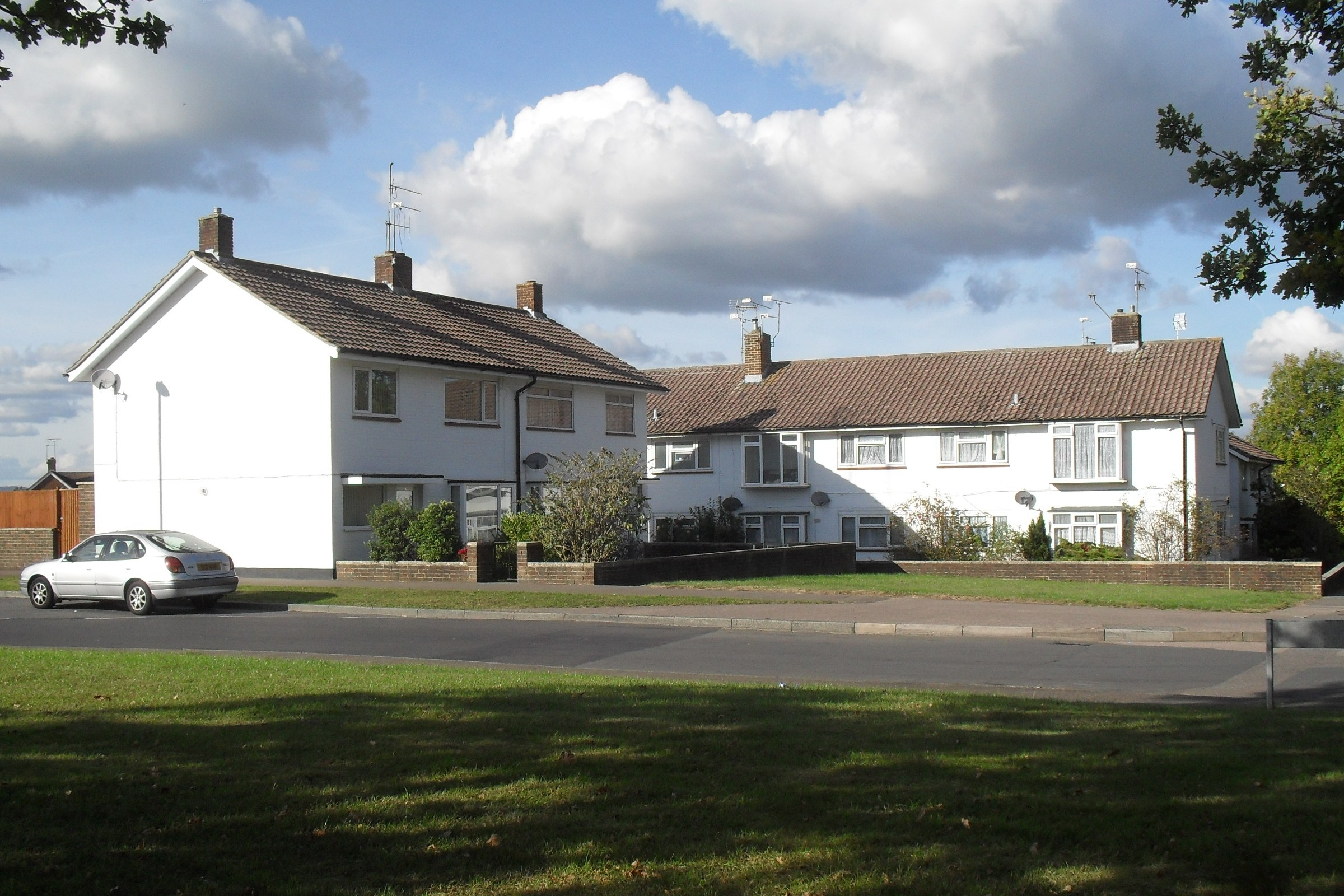
Most of the Corporation's housing stock consisted of "Group I" houses. Many were terraced or semi-detached, as here at Paddockhurst Road in Gossops Green.

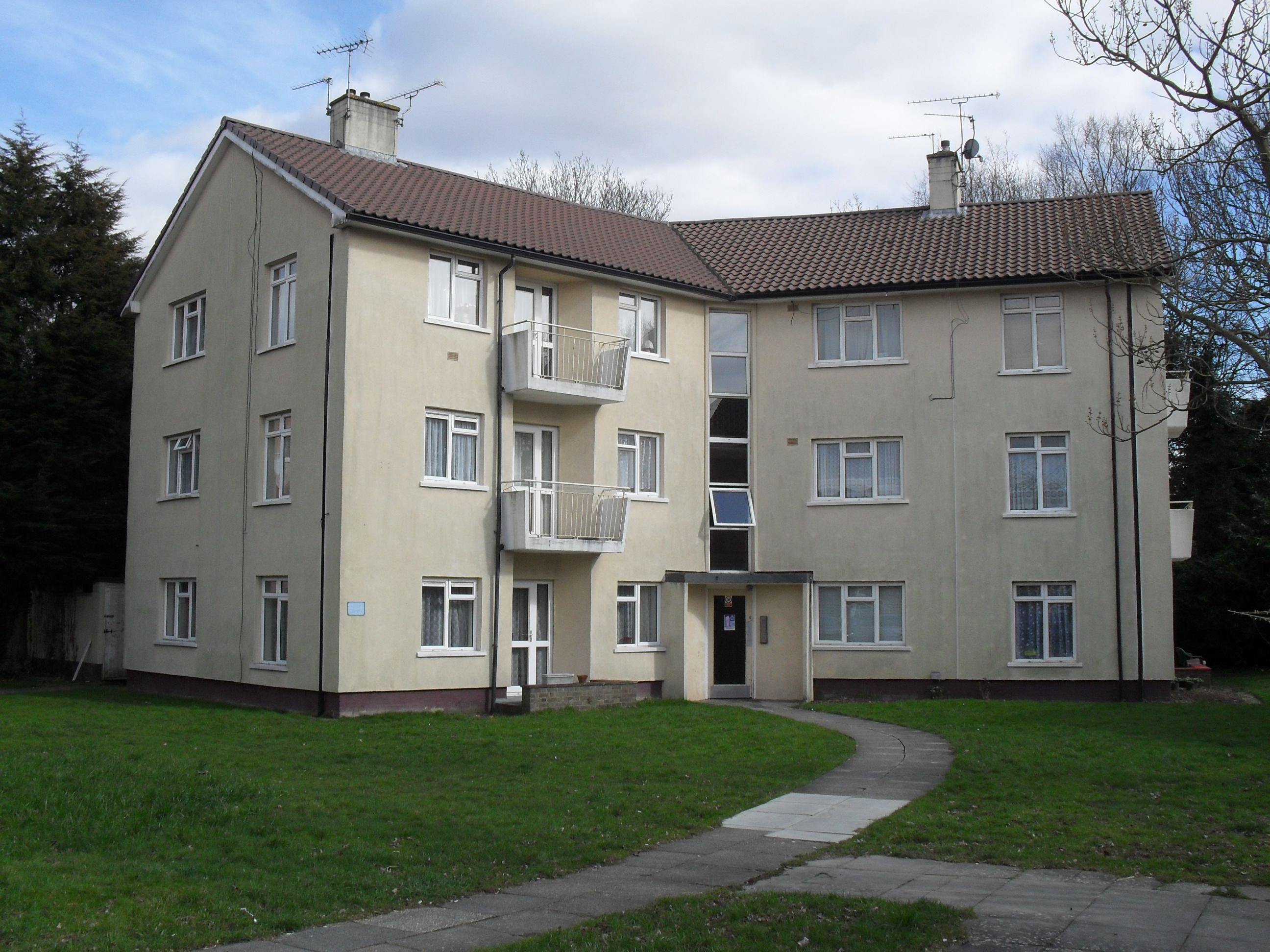
Few flats were built by the Development Corporation; the Sunnymead flats in West Green were among the first.

From the time it was established, one of Crawley Development Corporation's main aims was to house former Londoners who were moving to work in the New Town. The master plan aimed to build nine self-contained residential neighbourhoods (later increased to ten, and with three more added since) which would be "small socially mixed residential areas, each with [their] own individuality and [their] own centre, in order to promote neighbourliness and the social development of the town". As far as possible, the new housing was to be fitted round the existing development in Three Bridges, Crawley and Ifield, which by the time of Minoprio's report consisted of about 2,600 houses. The Corporation carried out a survey of the local housing stock in 1947.

As early as 1946, the government was insistent that Crawley New Town should be predominantly for people moving out of substandard housing in London. In a report that year, Lewis Silkin stated that East and West Sussex County Councils would have to make their own provision for housing for tenants on their waiting lists. The main qualification for a Crawley Development Corporation house was proof of employment in Crawley, so the Corporation's provision of housing was closely linked with its early and rapid development of the Manor Royal industrial estate. Local people who had longstanding links with the Crawley area were disappointed with the Corporation's inability to build houses for them, and this continued to be a problem throughout the Corporation's existence. The county councils and rural district councils (and later, the Urban District Council) provided some new houses when they could, as they had before the New Town existed.

To meet Minoprio's plans for a balanced community, several types of housing were designed by the Development Corporation's architects between 1947 and 1949. Group I ("Housing Manual Standard") houses were to form 80% of the town's housing stock. They would mostly be terraced, with some semi-detached houses; designs with between one and five bedrooms were produced; and they would all be for rent only. Group II ("Intermediate Standard") houses would make up 15% of the New Town's accommodation. Mostly semi-detached, they would be for rent or for sale at £2,000 to £2,500. Group III houses would be larger detached properties for managers and executives. Most would be sold at between £3,000 and £5,000, but again some could be rented. From mid-1949, 105 Group I houses were put up in the first New Town neighbourhood, West Green, and over the next year work began on houses from all three categories. Variation in design and style was encouraged by the Corporation, but it had the power to vet and approve all designs and could also allow outside architects to provide them. Overall, this central approval process brought about homogenisation: "most of the houses in the town are characteristic of public housing of the 1950s", featuring red-brick walls, exterior cladding, tiled roofs of varying steepness, and occasional use of concrete. The Corporation planned to build more low-rise flats than were eventually provided: there was intended to be an 85%–15% split between houses and flats, but this was revised downwards because most incoming Londoners asked for houses. The two earliest neighbourhoods, West Green and Northgate, have the most flats.

Houses were built as part of carefully planned self-contained neighbourhoods. The master plan included nine: four adjacent to the town centre and inside an inner ring road and five beyond this. The Corporation completed the construction of all nine (although the ninth, Gossops Green, was unfinished as at 1962), and started work on a tenth. The inner neighbourhoods were West Green (built 1949–54), Northgate (1951–55), Three Bridges (1952–55) and Southgate (eastern part 1955–57; the western section was delayed until after the Development Corporation era). Langley Green, the first of the outer ring of neighbourhoods, was built in 1952–56; Pound Hill was partly built up in 1953–56; Ifield dates from 1954 to 1957; Tilgate was developed between 1955 and 1958; and Gossops Green dates from 1956 to 1961. Land east of Tilgate that was designated in the master plan as "reserve residential" was laid out with utilities from 1960; the Corporation had erected about 500 houses in the neighbourhood, named Furnace Green, by the time of its dissolution.

The Corporation aimed to act responsibly in its provision of housing. It tried to ensure that two neighbourhoods were under construction at all times so that new residents did not all have to life in the same part of town. Corporation staff visited new residents to ensure they were adapting to live in their new houses. Houses and roads were sympathetic to the topography of the area where possible: old trees were kept, streets followed the lie of the land and houses were set back behind grassed areas or placed at an angle. People moving from London often wanted to move several generations of their family to Crawley; so bungalows and (from the 1960s) old people's homes were provided. The Corporation succeeded in its aim of moving people out of London: by 1966, when the population was about 60,000, 73% of residents had moved from the city in the last 20 years. Only 11% were long-term Crawley residents who already lived in the town in 1947. Its intention of ensuring a balanced social mix in each neighbourhood, by building houses of various grades and statuses in close proximity, was less successful: some neighbourhoods have developed distinct characters, such as middle-class (Pound Hill) and working-class (Langley Green).

== Provision of industry and employment by the Corporation ==
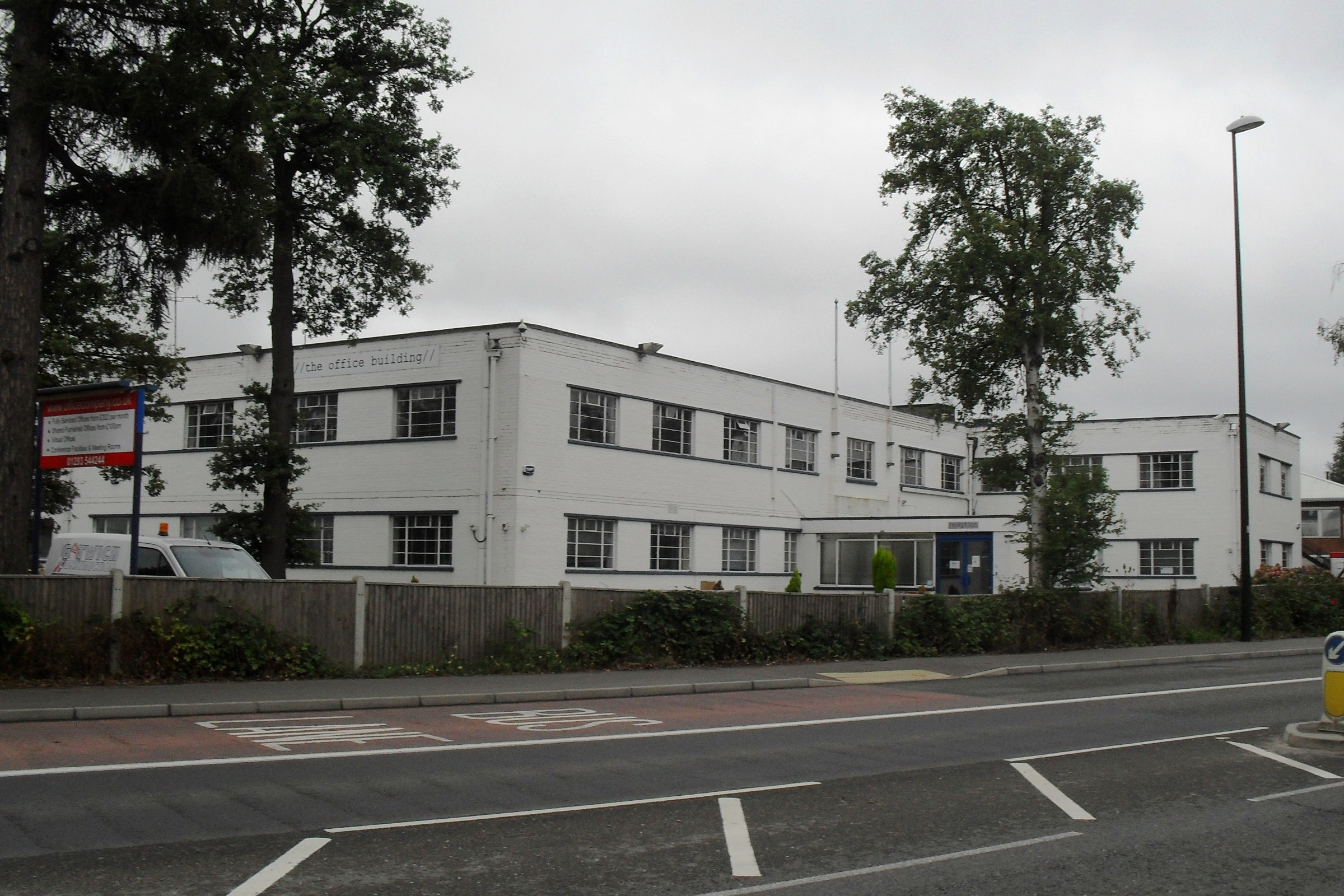
The Corporation built many factories to a standard design in the 1950s on the Manor Royal industrial estate.

Jobs as well as people were to be moved out of London to the New Towns, and another of Crawley Development Corporation's main tasks was to select firms that were suitable to be moved to the town. This needed to be done quickly to ensure varied employment was available for the thousands of new residents: the government wanted people to live and work in Crawley rather than commuting out to London or elsewhere. Companies were encouraged, not forced, to relocate: the Corporation attempted to provide excellent conditions for industry to thrive, such as a well laid out (and in its own words "unusually attractive") industrial estate, good transport links and a range of factory sizes. About two years (1947–49) were spent on designing the Manor Royal estate. The policy succeeded: hundreds of London-based companies asked to move, and the Corporation was able to select the most suitable to ensure a range of industries and company sizes. It tried to prevent any single trade becoming dominant, and was partly successful; but Crawley did develop into a centre for the electronics and engineering industries, and by the late 1950s one in ten of the town's workers were employed by the A.P.V. Company (previously based in Slough and Wandsworth, and specialising in large machinery and metalworking).

About 267 acres (108 ha) of land in the north of the designated area was devoted to industry in the masterplan, and more land was held in reserve east of the London–Brighton railway line. The site was close to the stations at Gatwick and Three Bridges; there was space for sidings and goods facilities; major roads were nearby; and the prevailing southwesterly winds would keep pollution away from residential areas. The Corporation built small factories to a standard design from 1950, and also offered custom-designed larger units for major companies. Land was also offered on a leasehold basis to firms if they wanted to build their own premises. Factories of different sizes were planned to be distributed throughout the Manor Royal estate, although in reality larger factories tended to cluster near the main roads.

Commercial development was slow during the Development Corporation era. There was only 55,000 square feet (5,100 m^{2}) of office space by 1962, when the Commission for New Towns took over responsibility; in the next three years, office accommodation increased sixfold. Early corporate headquarters included the Westminster Bank's administration centre in Station Way (1963). All office space completed by the Corporation passed to the control of the Commission for New Towns in 1962.

=== Gatwick Airport ===
By 1964, soon after the Corporation's dissolution, the industrial estate about supported about 16,000 jobs: the master plan had anticipated half that number. Labour shortages were frequent. From the 1960s, these were exacerbated by competition from the reopened and greatly enlarged Gatwick Airport, which stood next to the industrial estate and which offered high wages for semi-skilled and unskilled jobs—a threat anticipated by Thomas Bennett in the 1950s. In the 1940s and early 1950s, the Corporation expected no development to take place at the modest aerodrome, and even stated in September 1949 that it expected it to be decommissioned as an airport. In 1950, though, the government announced that it would be redeveloped as London's second airport; the Corporation retreated on its initial opposition—based principally on the effect the airport would have on local industry—and the scheme was agreed in 1954. The aerodrome closed between 1956 and 1958, and was extended and rebuilt as an international airport. One of the Corporation's last acts was to build hundreds of cheap houses for airport workers.

== Provision of utilities and services by the Corporation ==
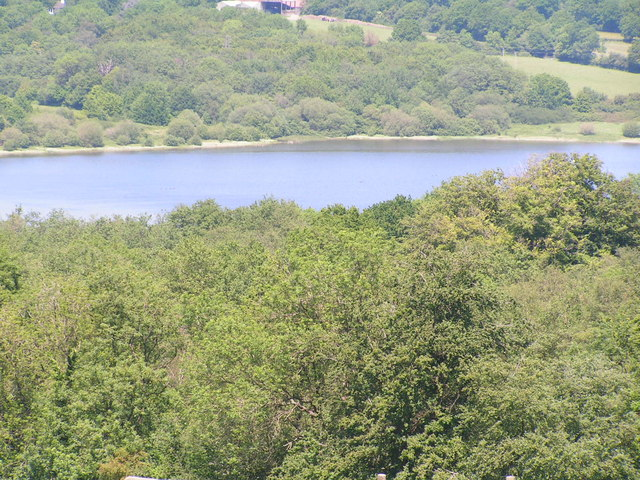
The Development Corporation led the way in establishing the Weir Wood Reservoir, which serves the town's water needs.

Crawley Development Corporation assumed responsibility for several public services in the town, and made an extensive study of its requirements in 1947–48. One of its conclusions was that every service would need to be provided at town, not neighbourhood, level. On 20 November 1948, the Ministry of Health designated the Corporation as a local water authority, and its chief engineer was put in charge of drainage provision. Working with other local water authorities, it established the Weir Wood Joint Water Board with the aim of building a large reservoir near Forest Row. Weir Wood Reservoir opened in 1954 and continues to supply Crawley's water needs. The Corporation also became a designated sewage authority on 2 April 1948, and used land it bought at Roll's Farm near Tinsley Green (one of its first actions after its creation in 1947) to build a sewage works which became operational in 1952. Crawley Urban District Council took over the Corporation's responsibilities in 1961.

Electricity provision was the responsibility of parish councils and local electricity providers such as SEEBOARD, but the Development Corporation set up a committee to bring them all together and ensure the town's needs were met efficiently. It also provided all street lighting in the town, and undertook a study into a concept called "whole-town heating" which had been tried in Stevenage, Britain's first postwar New Town.

The master plan made provision for a new hospital to replace Crawley Hospital in West Green. Despite support from the Corporation and Crawley Urban District Council, the regional health authority decided that the existing hospital should be extended and modernised instead. The Corporation had no responsibility for health clinics: these were built by West Sussex County Council, as were the police and fire stations.

== Later years and dissolution ==
In 1959, the Corporation's chief executive Colonel Turner left. A year later, Thomas Bennett—who with his "enthusiasm and energy ... left his stamp on the town"—resigned. Within 13 years, he had carried out his aim of turning Minoprio's master plan into reality. "Inflexible, dogmatic and highly successful", his influence ensured that the 15-year growth and other targets set in 1947 were met or exceeded. Few major projects remained, and the local council was able to take responsibility for the remaining needs of the developed community, which by the early 1960s had grown to 59,000 people. The New Towns Act 1959 created a national Commission for New Towns, whose responsibilities were similar to those of the original Development Corporations; accordingly in 1962, Crawley Development Corporation was wound up and the Commission acquired its assets. It was also granted some of the Corporation's former powers.

The form and function of modern Crawley are closely linked with the Development Corporation's actions during its 15-year existence. The layout of the urban area conforms closely to the master plan, and Crawley's continuing status as an important regional commercial and industrial centre is attributable to the work done by the Corporation in attracting outside firms and providing suitable sites for them. Other aims have not been met so successfully. The Corporation originally aimed to define a firm boundary for the urban area, preventing additional development and preserving the green belt (whose extent was marked on the master plan). Since 1962, the original nine residential neighbourhoods have become 13 with the addition of Furnace Green, Broadfield, Bewbush and Maidenbower, and the rapid growth of Gatwick Airport from the late 1950s meant that more land was needed for its dependent industries. The airport, previously in Surrey, was brought within Crawley's boundary in 1974, extending the urban area northwards.

== Coat of arms ==
Crawley Development Corporation was granted a coat of arms in 1951. Its official heraldic description is "Or, on a fesse gules between three crows sable, three chevronels interlaced argent, all within a bordure azure charged with sixteen martles or". The crows relate to the etymology of Crawley's name: by the 5th century, the area was known as Crow's Leah—a crow-infested clearing. The martlet, a mythical swallow-like bird with no feet, has been an emblem of Sussex since the 17th century or earlier. Elements from the coat of arms were used in some of the street names of the Broadfield neighbourhood when it was built in the 1970s.
