= Thomas Bennett (architect) =

English architect (1887–1980)

Sir Thomas Bennett KBE FRIBA
- Portrait of Bennet from a bromide print by Walter Bird, 1967
- Born: 14 August 1887; Paddington, Middlesex, United Kingdom of Great Britain and Ireland
- Died: 29 January 1980 (aged 92)
- Education: Royal Academy Schools
- Occupation: Architect
- Children: P.H.P.Bennett
- Projects: Crawley and Stevenage

Sir Thomas Penberthy Bennett KBE FRIBA (14 August 1887 – 29 January 1980) was an English architect, responsible for much of the development of the new towns of Crawley and Stevenage.

== Biography ==
=== Early life ===
Bennett was born in 1887 in Paddington, London. He trained as an architect at Regent Street Polytechnic while employed in the drawing office of the London and North Western Railway. He went on to study at the Royal Academy Schools.

=== Career ===
Bennett joined the Office of Works (later Ministry of Works) in 1911. A career in both education and government followed, until setting up his own practice known as TP Bennett in 1921. In 1922, he became a Fellow of the Royal Institute of British Architects.

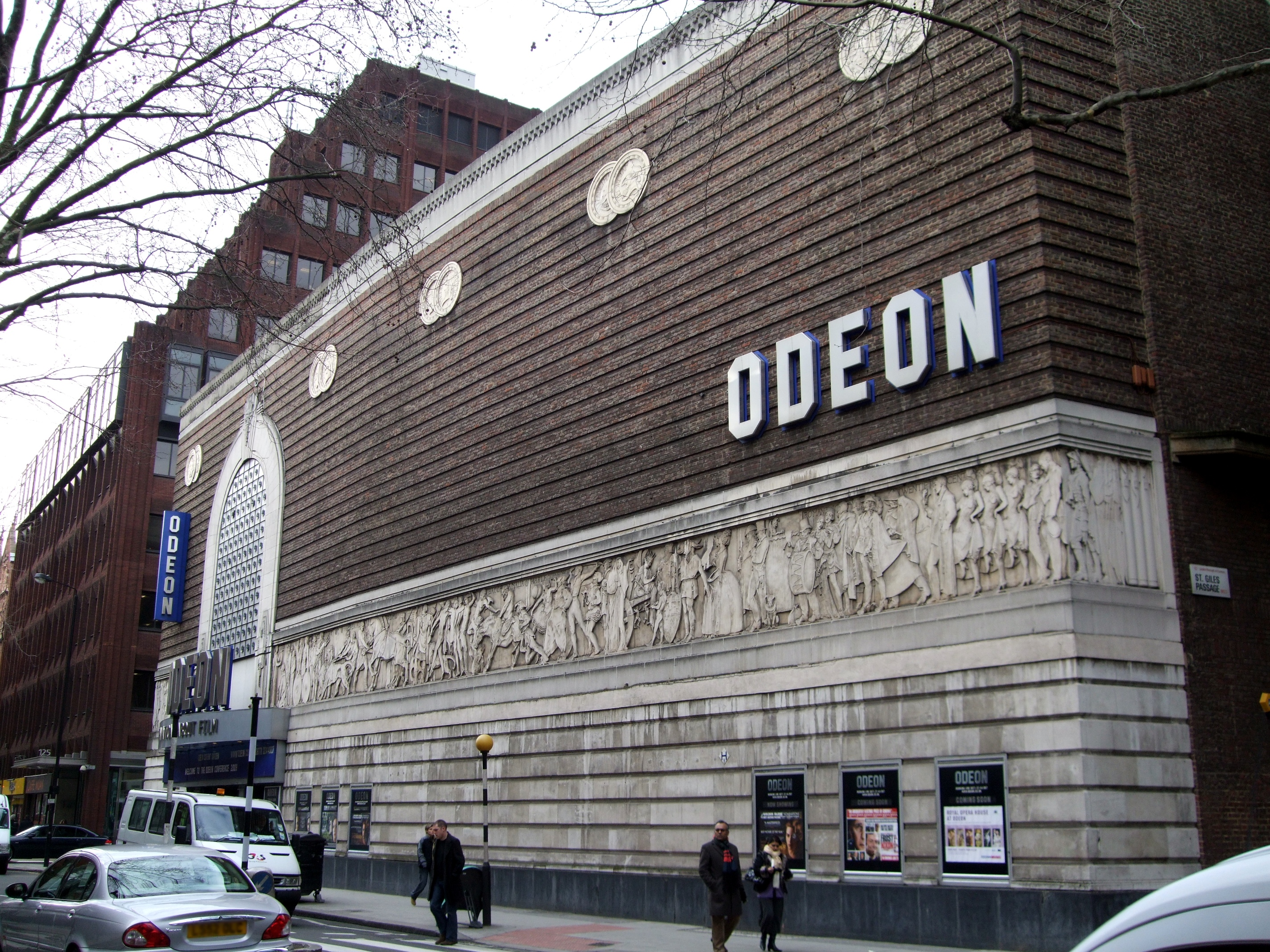
Saville Theatre, London

In 1940, he became Director of Bricks at the Ministry of Works, where he was awarded the CBE in 1942, but returned to private practice immediately after the Second World War. He was knighted in 1946.

His practice was responsible for many landmark buildings such as the Saville Theatre, Esso House, John Barnes Department store, Hampstead (since 1986, a branch of Waitrose), Westminster Hospital, a BOAC air terminal, the Latter-day Saint London Temple in Surrey, Smithfield Poultry Market in London, and Hawkins House in Dublin.

In 1947, Bennett was appointed as the Chairman of the Development Corporation of Crawley New Town, in West Sussex, a post he held until 1960. In his early days at the Development Corporation, he was responsible for the scrapping of the existing plans for the New Town, and the appointment of Sir Anthony Minoprio to create a new master plan. When the town was built, a new comprehensive school was named for him, opening in 1958. He also took over responsibility for the Stevenage New Town which had been initially the responsibility of Monica Felton.

After the completion of Crawley New Town, in 1958 Bennett designed the terraced houses (1–14) on Middle Field, St John's Wood, which the Twentieth Century Society have recognised as well-preserved mid-century reinterpretation if the Georgian Terrace. He opened the Thomas Bennett Community College school in Tilgate, Crawley, officially in November 1959. After a section of the original Smithfield Poultry Market was destroyed by fire in 1958, Bennett designed its replacement, built between 1961–63 and with a unique concrete shell domed roof, believed to be the largest in Europe at the time. In 1964 he designed the Crawley Chapel of The Church of Jesus Christ of Latter-day Saints. Other T.P. Bennett buildings are the UK Ford HQ at Warley (1965) and the Forton motorway service station (1965).

He was awarded the Order of the British Empire in 1954. His private practice, T.P. Bennett and Son, expanded into an architectural company and in 1967 was passed to his only son, P.H.P.Bennett.

=== Death ===
He died on 29 January 1980.

== Partial list of buildings ==
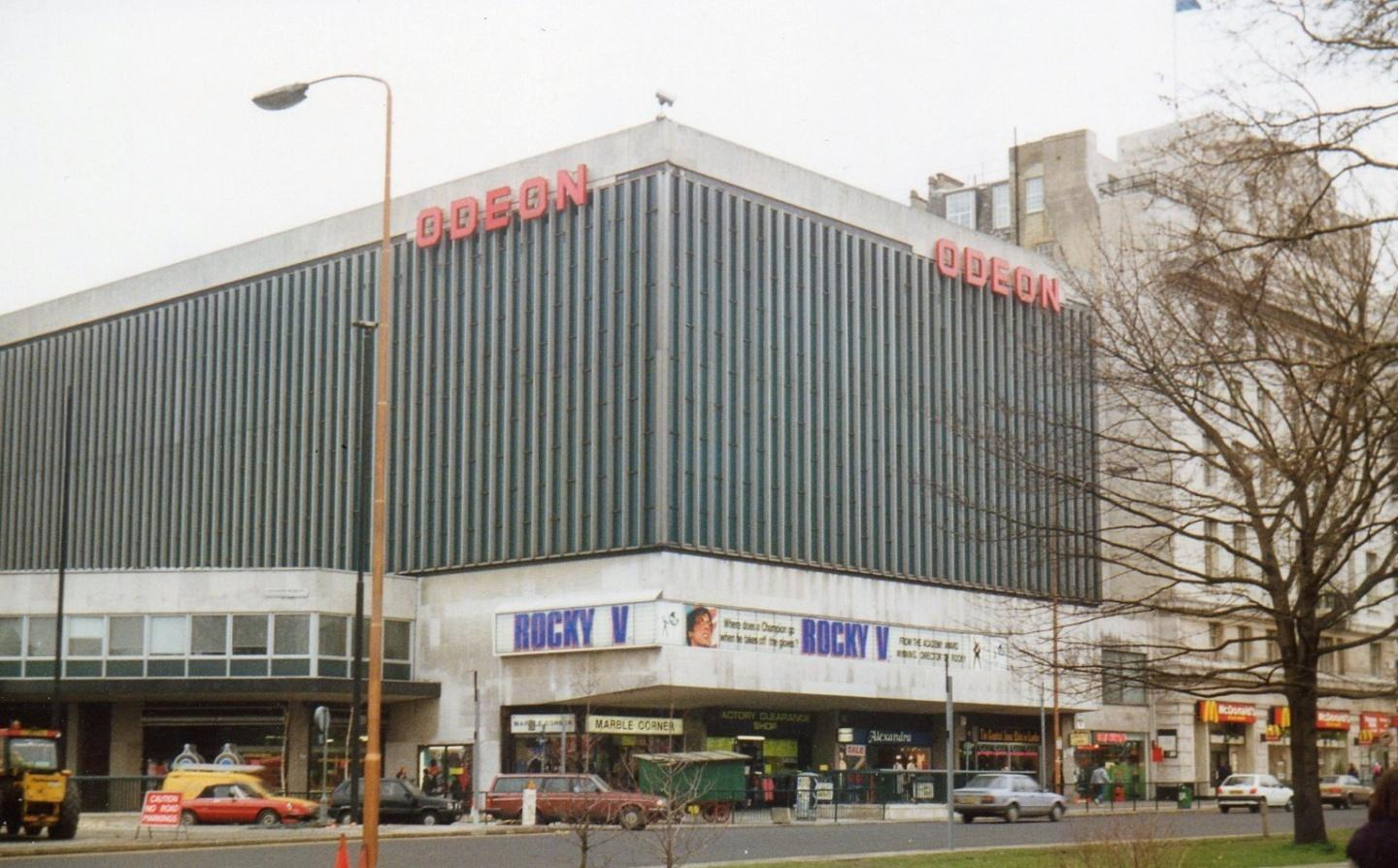
Odeon Marble Arch (opened 1967)

- Marsham Court, Marsham Street, City of Westminster (1937)
- Saville Theatre, Shaftesbury Avenue, London Borough of Camden (1931)
- Esso House, Victoria Road, Victoria (1962)
- John Barnes department store, Hampstead (1935)
- Terraced houses on Middle Field, St John's Wood (1958)
- Hyde Park Chapel, South Kensington, Royal Borough of Kensington and Chelsea (1961)
- Smithfield Poultry Market, London (1963)
- London Temple, Newchapel, Surrey (1960)
- The Army & Navy ('Rag') Club, Pall Mall, London (1963)
- Hawkins House, Dublin
