= Dixons City Academy =

Academy in Bradford, West Yorkshire, England

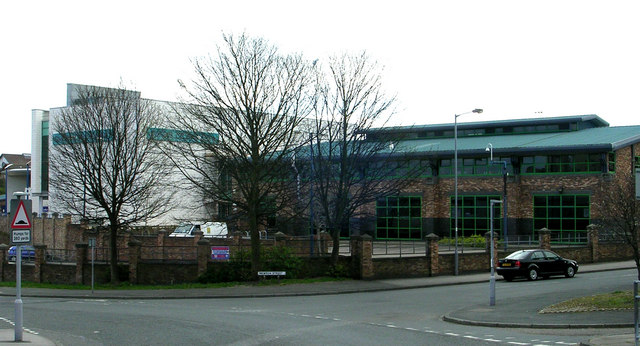
- Bradford, West Yorkshire; England

Information
- Type: Academy
- Established: 1990
- Founder: Sir John Lewis
- Local authority: City of Bradford
- Department for Education URN: 130909 Tables
- Ofsted: Reports
- Website: www.dixonsca.com

Dixons City Academy is an academy in Bradford, West Yorkshire, England. The school was founded in 1990 as Dixons City Technology College which focused on a specialism of design and technology and product design. In 2005, the school converted into an academy and changed its name to Dixons City Academy. With the change of name was a change of focus as the school became a specialist performing arts school which allows it to select 10% of admissions purely based on ability in this field. In November 2018, the school was judged "outstanding", in an Ofsted inspection.

== Dixons Academies Trust ==
The school founded the Dixons Academies Charitable Trust, Ltd.

Founding principal Sir John Lewis retired from the school in 2006 and was succeeded by Sir Nick Weller. Weller became Executive Principal in September 2011 when Dixons took over the former Rhodesway School in Allerton, Bradford. His deputy Shirley Watson then became the principal. Sir Nick Weller became CEO of the Dixons Academies Trust as it expanded, with Shirley Watson later becoming one of two Executive Directors (along with Luke Sparkes, former Principal of one of Dixons' highest performing schools: Dixons Trinity Academy, and four Executive Principals: Wesley Davies of Dixons McMillan; Michelle Long of Dixons Music Primary; Neil Miley of Dixons Kings; Clare Skelding of Dixons Allerton).

Sir Nick was made Knight Bachelor by Queen Elizabeth II for services to education in 2015, and his report to HM Treasury and the Department for Education on schools in the Northern Powerhouse region was published in November 2016.

Michael Feely, former Deputy Headteacher at Our Lady's Convent Roman Catholic High School in London and England Youth international football player, was appointed as Principal of DCA in September 2018, leading the academy to a successful "Outstanding" Ofsted report 2 months later.

In February 2020, the Trust was ranked second best performing in the country on the DfE's Progress 8 measure at 0.72, just 0.02 behind the lead MAT: Star Academies Trust of Blackburn.
