= 2003 United Kingdom local elections =

- 1 May 2003

All 36 metropolitan boroughs, 40 out of 46 unitary authorities, 232 out of 238 English districts and all 32 Scottish council areas
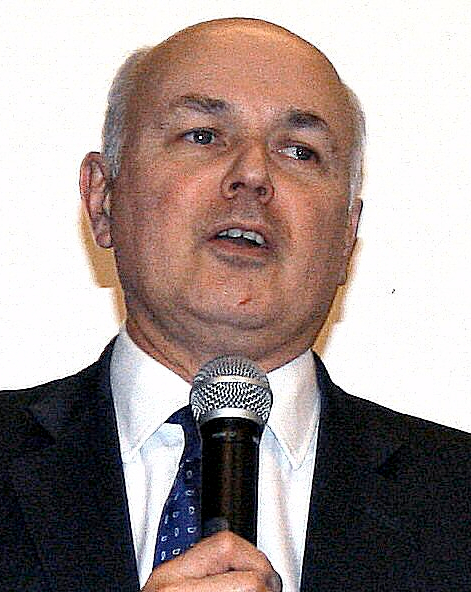

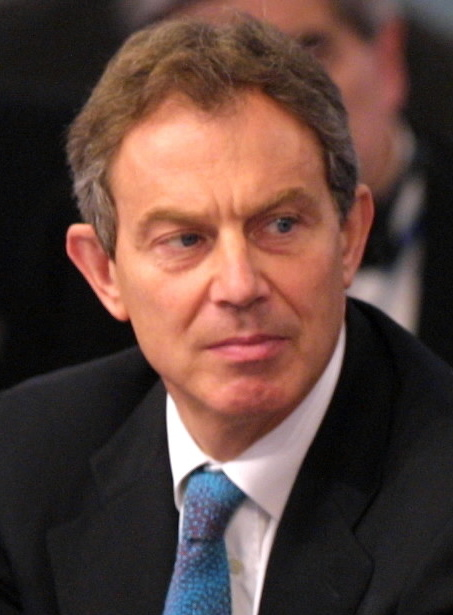

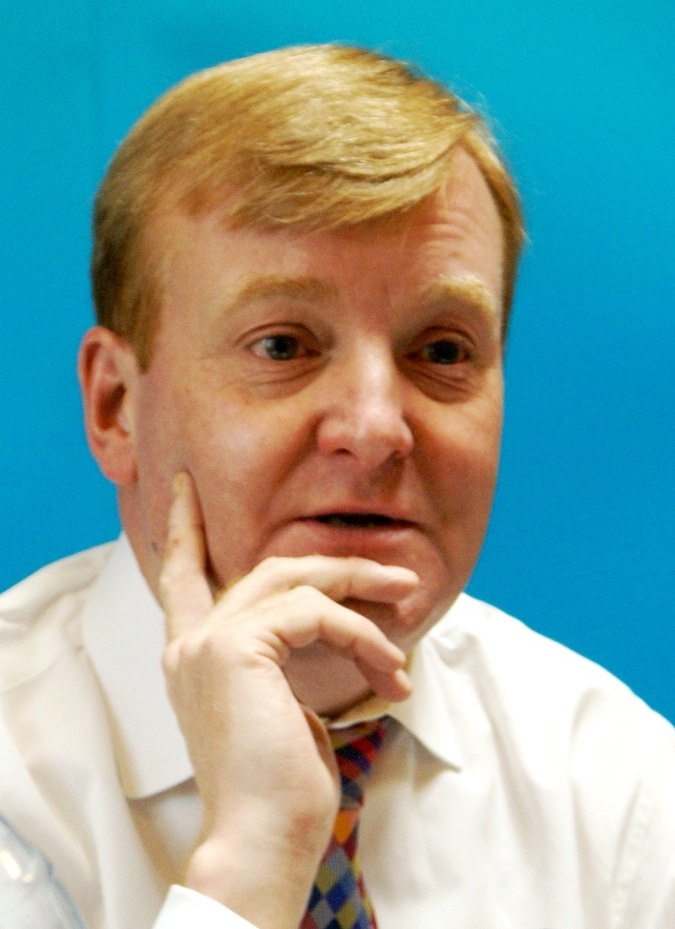
	Majority party	Minority party	Third party
Leader	Iain Duncan Smith	Tony Blair	Charles Kennedy
Party	Conservative	Labour	Liberal Democrats
Leader since	13 September 2001	21 July 1994	9 August 1999
Percentage	35% (Note: All vote shares in the infobox are projected national vote shares, not total votes cast.)	30%	30%
Swing	▲1%	▼3%	▲3%
Councils	110	66	28
Councils +/-	▲31	▼28	▲5
Councillors	4,423	3,001	2,624
Councillors +/-	▲566	▼833	▲193
- Colours denote council control following elections, as shown in the main table of results.

The 2003 United Kingdom local elections were held on Thursday 1 May 2003, the same day as the Scottish Parliamentary and the Welsh Assembly elections. There were local elections for all councils in Scotland and in most of England. There were no local elections in Wales, Northern Ireland or London.

The ruling Labour Party lost a considerable 833 seats, while both the main opposition parties, Conservative and Liberal Democrat, polled strongly, with the Conservatives enjoying the largest share of the vote. Labour had now been in government for six years and still had a triple-digit majority, and over the summer of 2003 some opinion polls showed the Conservatives level with Labour. However, these were to be the last of the two local council elections contested by the Conservatives under the leadership of Iain Duncan Smith, who was ousted as leader later in the year and succeeded by Michael Howard due to his unpopularity as leader and doubts about his ability to win a general election.

Fifty-nine councils held electoral pilot schemes to try to boost turnout figures. Schemes included all postal voting, mobile polling stations, alterations to voting hours and various kinds of electronic voting. The most successful in raising turnout was all-postal voting which saw turnout rise to an average of 50%. In comparison, turnout across the whole of England was only 33%.

== Results ==
The Labour Party lost a considerable 833 seats, losing control of councils such as Birmingham and Coventry, both of which the party had controlled for 20 years.

The Conservative Party, who following the elections had the most councillors in the country (ahead of Labour by 601), extended its lead over the Labour party by 1,399 councillors. However, their celebrations were tempered by the resignation of Conservative front bencher Crispin Blunt, who described the party leader, Iain Duncan Smith as a "handicap" and called for him to be replaced.

Party	Councils				Councillors			
Party	Gain	Loss	Change	Total	Gain	Loss	Change	Total
Conservative			▲+31	110			▲+566	4,423
Labour			▼-28	66			▼-833	3,001
Liberal Democrats			▲+5	28			▲+193	2,624
Independent			▼-2	10			▼-42	1,142
SNP			▼-1	1			▼-21	182
Residents			Steady	2			Steady	84
Green			Steady	0			▲+9	34
BNP			Steady	0			▲+13	13
Liberal			Steady	0			▼-2	9
Health Concern			Steady	0			▼-2	5
Scottish Socialist			Steady	0			▼-1	2
Other	0	0	Steady	0			▼-24	107
No overall control			▼-5	123	—	—	—	—

== England ==
=== Metropolitan boroughs ===
All 36 English Metropolitan borough councils had one third of their seats up for election.

Council	Previous control	Result	Details
Barnsley	Labour	Labour hold	Details
Birmingham	Labour	No overall control gain	Details
Bolton	Labour	No overall control gain	Details
Bradford	No overall control	No overall control hold	Details
Bury	Labour	Labour hold	Details
Calderdale	No overall control	No overall control hold	Details
Coventry	Labour	No overall control gain	Details
Doncaster	Labour	Labour hold	Details
Dudley	Labour	No overall control gain	Details
Gateshead	Labour	Labour hold	Details
Kirklees	No overall control	No overall control hold	Details
Knowsley	Labour	Labour hold	Details
Leeds	Labour	Labour hold	Details
Liverpool	Liberal Democrats	Liberal Democrats hold	Details
Manchester	Labour	Labour hold	Details
Newcastle upon Tyne	Labour	Labour hold	Details
North Tyneside	Labour	Labour hold	Details
Oldham	No overall control	Labour gain	Details
Rochdale	Labour	No overall control gain	Details
Rotherham	Labour	Labour hold	Details
St. Helens	Labour	Labour hold	Details
Salford	Labour	Labour hold	Details
Sandwell	Labour	Labour hold	Details
Sefton	No overall control	No overall control hold	Details
Sheffield	No overall control	Labour gain	Details
Solihull	Conservative	Conservative hold	Details
South Tyneside	Labour	Labour hold	Details
Stockport	Liberal Democrats	Liberal Democrats hold	Details
Sunderland	Labour	Labour hold	Details
Tameside	Labour	Labour hold	Details
Trafford	Labour	No overall control gain	Details
Wakefield	Labour	Labour hold	Details
Walsall	No overall control	No overall control hold	Details
Wigan	Labour	Labour hold	Details
Wirral	No overall control	No overall control hold	Details
Wolverhampton	Labour	Labour hold	Details

=== Unitary authorities ===
==== Whole council ====
In 27 English Unitary authorities the whole council was up for election.

Council	Previous control	Result	Details
Bath and North East Somerset	No overall control	No overall control hold	Details
Blackpool ‡	Labour	Labour hold	Details
Bournemouth ‡	No overall control	Liberal Democrats gain	Details
Bracknell Forest ‡	Conservative	Conservative hold	Details
Brighton and Hove ‡	Labour	No overall control gain	Details
Darlington ‡	Labour	Labour hold	Details
East Riding of Yorkshire ‡	No overall control	No overall control hold	Details
Herefordshire ‡	No overall control	No overall control hold	Details
Leicester ‡	No overall control	No overall control hold	Details
Luton ‡	Labour	No overall control gain	Details
Medway ‡	No overall control	Conservative gain	Details
Middlesbrough ‡	Labour	Labour hold	Details
North East Lincolnshire ‡	Labour	No overall control gain	Details
North Lincolnshire ‡	Labour	Conservative gain	Details
North Somerset	Conservative	No overall control gain	Details
Nottingham ‡	Labour	Labour hold	Details
Plymouth ‡	Conservative	Labour gain	Details
Poole ‡	No overall control	Conservative gain	Details
Redcar and Cleveland ‡	Labour	No overall control gain	Details
Rutland ‡	Independent	Conservative gain	Details
South Gloucestershire	Liberal Democrats	No overall control gain	Details
Stockton-on-Tees	Labour	Labour hold	Details
Telford and Wrekin ‡	Labour	Labour hold	Details
Torbay ‡	Conservative	Liberal Democrats gain	Details
West Berkshire ‡	Liberal Democrats	No overall control gain	Details
Windsor and Maidenhead ‡	No overall control	Liberal Democrats gain	Details
York ‡	No overall control	Liberal Democrats gain	Details

‡ New ward boundaries

==== Third of council ====
In 13 English Unitary authorities one third of the council was up for election.

Council	Previous control	Result	Details
Bristol	Labour	No overall control gain	Details
Derby	Labour	No overall control gain	Details
Hartlepool	No overall control	No overall control hold	Details
Kingston upon Hull	No overall control	No overall control hold	Details
Milton Keynes	Liberal Democrats	Liberal Democrats hold	Details
Portsmouth	No overall control	No overall control hold	Details
Reading	Labour	Labour hold	Details
Slough	Labour	Labour hold	Details
Southampton	No overall control	No overall control hold	Details
Southend-on-Sea	Conservative	Conservative hold	Details
Stoke-on-Trent	No overall control	No overall control hold	Details
Swindon	No overall control	No overall control hold	Details
Wokingham	Conservative	Conservative hold	Details

=== District councils ===
==== Whole council ====
In 150 English district authorities the whole council was up for election.

Council	Previous control	Result	Details
Allerdale	Labour	No overall control gain	Details
Alnwick	No overall control	No overall control hold	Details
Arun ‡	Conservative	Conservative hold	Details
Ashfield ‡	Labour	No overall control gain	Details
Ashford ‡	No overall control	Conservative gain	Details
Aylesbury Vale ‡	No overall control	Conservative gain	Details
Babergh ‡	No overall control	No overall control hold	Details
Berwick-upon-Tweed	Liberal Democrats	No overall control gain	Details
Blaby ‡	Conservative	Conservative hold	Details
Blyth Valley	Labour	Labour hold	Details
Bolsover ‡	Labour	Labour hold	Details
Boston	No overall control	No overall control hold	Details
Braintree ‡	No overall control	No overall control hold	Details
Breckland ‡	Conservative	Conservative hold	Details
Bridgnorth ‡	Independent	No overall control gain	Details
Bromsgrove ‡	Conservative	Conservative hold	Details
Broxtowe ‡	Labour	No overall control gain	Details
Canterbury ‡	No overall control	No overall control hold	Details
Caradon ‡	No overall control	No overall control hold	Details
Carrick ‡	Liberal Democrats	Liberal Democrats hold	Details
Castle Morpeth	No overall control	No overall control hold	Details
Castle Point ‡	Labour	Conservative gain	Details
Charnwood ‡	No overall control	No overall control hold	Details
Chelmsford ‡	No overall control	Conservative gain	Details
Chester-le-Street ‡	Labour	Labour hold	Details
Chesterfield ‡	Labour	Liberal Democrats gain	Details
Chichester ‡	Conservative	Conservative hold	Details
Chiltern ‡	Conservative	Conservative hold	Details
Christchurch ‡	Conservative	Conservative hold	Details
Copeland	Labour	Labour hold	Details
Corby	Labour	Labour hold	Details
Cotswold ‡	No overall control	Conservative gain	Details
Dacorum	No overall control	Conservative gain	Details
Dartford ‡	Labour	No overall control gain	Details
Derbyshire Dales ‡	Conservative	Conservative hold	Details
Derwentside ‡	Labour	Labour hold	Details
Dover ‡	No overall control	No overall control hold	Details
Durham ‡	Labour	Liberal Democrats gain	Details
Easington ‡	Labour	Labour hold	Details
East Cambridgeshire ‡	Liberal Democrats	No overall control gain	Details
East Devon ‡	Conservative	Conservative hold	Details
East Dorset ‡	Conservative	Conservative hold	Details
East Hampshire ‡	Conservative	Conservative hold	Details
East Hertfordshire	Conservative	Conservative hold	Details
East Lindsey	Independent	No overall control gain	Details
East Northamptonshire	Conservative	Conservative hold	Details
East Staffordshire ‡	Labour	Conservative gain	Details
Eden	Independent	Independent hold	Details
Epsom and Ewell ‡	Residents	Residents hold	Details
Erewash ‡	Labour	Conservative gain	Details
Fenland ‡	Conservative	Conservative hold	Details
Forest Heath ‡	Conservative	Conservative hold	Details
Forest of Dean ‡	Labour	No overall control gain	Details
Fylde ‡	No overall control	Conservative gain	Details
Gedling ‡	Conservative	No overall control gain	Details
Gravesham ‡	Labour	Labour hold	Details
Guildford ‡	No overall control	Conservative gain	Details
Hambleton ‡	Conservative	Conservative hold	Details
Harborough ‡	No overall control	No overall control hold	Details
High Peak ‡	Labour	No overall control gain	Details
Hinckley and Bosworth ‡	No overall control	Conservative gain	Details
Horsham ‡	Conservative	No overall control gain	Details
Kennet ‡	Conservative	Conservative hold	Details
Kerrier ‡	No overall control	No overall control hold	Details
Kettering	Labour	Conservative gain	Details
King's Lynn and West Norfolk ‡	No overall control	Conservative gain	Details
Lancaster ‡	No overall control	No overall control hold	Details
Lewes ‡	Liberal Democrats	Liberal Democrats hold	Details
Lichfield ‡	Conservative	Conservative hold	Details
Maldon ‡	Conservative	Conservative hold	Details
Malvern Hills ‡	Conservative	No overall control gain	Details
Mansfield ‡	Labour	Independent gain	Details
Melton ‡	No overall control	Conservative gain	Details
Mendip	No overall control	Conservative gain	Details
Mid Bedfordshire ‡	Conservative	Conservative hold	Details
Mid Devon ‡	No overall control	No overall control hold	Details
Mid Suffolk ‡	No overall control	Conservative gain	Details
Mid Sussex ‡	Conservative	Conservative hold	Details
New Forest ‡	Conservative	Conservative hold	Details
Newark and Sherwood ‡	No overall control	No overall control hold	Details
North Cornwall ‡	Independent	Independent hold	Details
North Devon ‡	Liberal Democrats	Liberal Democrats hold	Details
North Dorset ‡	No overall control	No overall control hold	Details
North East Derbyshire ‡	Labour	Labour hold	Details
North Kesteven	No overall control	No overall control hold	Details
North Norfolk ‡	No overall control	Liberal Democrats gain	Details
North Shropshire ‡	Independent	No overall control gain	Details
North Warwickshire ‡	Labour	No overall control gain	Details
North West Leicestershire ‡	Labour	Labour hold	Details
North Wiltshire ‡	No overall control	No overall control hold	Details
Northampton	Labour	No overall control gain	Details
Oadby and Wigston ‡	Liberal Democrats	Liberal Democrats hold	Details
Oswestry ‡	No overall control	No overall control hold	Details
Restormel ‡	No overall control	No overall control hold	Details
Ribble Valley ‡	No overall control	Conservative gain	Details
Richmondshire ‡	No overall control	No overall control hold	Details
Rother ‡	Conservative	Conservative hold	Details
Rushcliffe ‡	Conservative	Conservative hold	Details
Ryedale ‡	No overall control	No overall control hold	Details
Salisbury ‡	No overall control	Conservative gain	Details
Scarborough ‡	No overall control	Conservative gain	Details
Sedgefield ‡	Labour	Labour hold	Details
Sedgemoor	Conservative	Conservative hold	Details
Selby ‡	No overall control	Conservative gain	Details
Sevenoaks ‡	Conservative	Conservative hold	Details
Shepway ‡	Conservative	Liberal Democrats gain	Details
South Bucks ‡	Conservative	Conservative hold	Details
South Derbyshire ‡	Labour	Labour hold	Details
South Hams	Conservative	Conservative hold	Details
South Holland	No overall control	Conservative gain	Details
South Kesteven	No overall control	Conservative gain	Details
South Norfolk ‡	Liberal Democrats	Liberal Democrats hold	Details
South Northamptonshire	Conservative	Conservative hold	Details
South Oxfordshire ‡	No overall control	Conservative gain	Details
South Ribble ‡	No overall control	No overall control hold	Details
South Shropshire ‡	No overall control	No overall control hold	Details
South Somerset	Liberal Democrats	Liberal Democrats hold	Details
South Staffordshire ‡	Conservative	Conservative hold	Details
Spelthorne ‡	Conservative	Conservative hold	Details
St Edmundsbury ‡	No overall control	Conservative gain	Details
Stafford ‡	No overall control	Conservative gain	Details
Staffordshire Moorlands ‡	No overall control	No overall control hold	Details
Suffolk Coastal ‡	Conservative	Conservative hold	Details
Surrey Heath ‡	Conservative	Conservative hold	Details
Taunton Deane	No overall control	Conservative gain	Details
Teesdale ‡	No overall control	Independent gain	Details
Teignbridge ‡	No overall control	No overall control hold	Details
Tendring ‡	No overall control	No overall control hold	Details
Test Valley ‡	Conservative	Conservative hold	Details
Tewkesbury ‡	No overall control	No overall control hold	Details
Thanet ‡	Labour	Conservative gain	Details
Tonbridge and Malling ‡	No overall control	Conservative gain	Details
Torridge ‡	No overall control	No overall control hold	Details
Tynedale	No overall control	Conservative gain	Details
Uttlesford ‡	No overall control	Liberal Democrats gain	Details
Vale of White Horse ‡	Liberal Democrats	Liberal Democrats hold	Details
Vale Royal	Labour	No overall control gain	Details
Wansbeck	Labour	Labour hold	Details
Warwick ‡	No overall control	No overall control hold	Details
Waverley ‡	Conservative	Liberal Democrats gain	Details
Wealden ‡	Conservative	Conservative hold	Details
Wear Valley ‡	Labour	Labour hold	Details
Wellingborough	Labour	Conservative gain	Details
West Devon ‡	No overall control	No overall control hold	Details
West Dorset ‡	No overall control	Conservative gain	Details
West Somerset	Conservative	Conservative hold	Details
West Wiltshire ‡	Liberal Democrats	No overall control gain	Details
Wychavon ‡	Conservative	Conservative hold	Details
Wycombe ‡	Conservative	Conservative hold	Details
Wyre ‡	Conservative	Conservative hold	Details

‡ New ward boundaries

==== Third of council ====
In 82 English district authorities one third of the council was up for election.

Council	Previous control	Result	Details
Adur	Conservative	Conservative hold	Details
Amber Valley	Conservative	Conservative hold	Details
Barrow-in-Furness	No overall control	Labour gain	Details
Basildon	No overall control	Conservative gain	Details
Basingstoke and Deane	No overall control	No overall control hold	Details
Bassetlaw	Labour	Labour hold	Details
Bedford	No overall control	No overall control hold	Details
Brentwood	Liberal Democrats	No overall control gain	Details
Broadland	Conservative	Conservative hold	Details
Broxbourne	Conservative	Conservative hold	Details
Burnley	Labour	Labour hold	Details
Cambridge	Liberal Democrats	Liberal Democrats hold	Details
Cannock Chase	Labour	No overall control gain	Details
Carlisle	No overall control	No overall control hold	Details
Cherwell	Conservative	Conservative hold	Details
Chester	No overall control	No overall control hold	Details
Chorley	No overall control	No overall control hold	Details
Colchester	No overall control	No overall control hold	Details
Congleton	No overall control	Conservative gain	Details
Craven	No overall control	No overall control hold	Details
Crawley	Labour	Labour hold	Details
Crewe and Nantwich	No overall control	No overall control hold	Details
Daventry	Conservative	Conservative hold	Details
Eastbourne	Liberal Democrats	Liberal Democrats hold	Details
Eastleigh	Liberal Democrats	Liberal Democrats hold	Details
Ellesmere Port and Neston	Labour	Labour hold	Details
Elmbridge	Residents	Residents hold	Details
Epping Forest	No overall control	No overall control hold	Details
Exeter	Labour	No overall control gain	Details
Gloucester	No overall control	No overall control hold	Details
Great Yarmouth	Conservative	Conservative hold	Details
Harlow	No overall control	No overall control hold	Details
Harrogate	No overall control	No overall control hold	Details
Hart	Conservative	Conservative hold	Details
Havant	Conservative	Conservative hold	Details
Hertsmere	Conservative	Conservative hold	Details
Huntingdonshire	Conservative	Conservative hold	Details
Hyndburn	Labour	Conservative gain	Details
Ipswich	Labour	Labour hold	Details
Lincoln	Labour	Labour hold	Details
Macclesfield	Conservative	Conservative hold	Details
Maidstone	No overall control	No overall control hold	Details
Mole Valley	No overall control	No overall control hold	Details
Newcastle-under-Lyme	No overall control	No overall control hold	Details
North Hertfordshire	Conservative	Conservative hold	Details
Norwich	Liberal Democrats	Liberal Democrats hold	Details
Pendle	No overall control	No overall control hold	Details
Penwith	No overall control	No overall control hold	Details
Preston	No overall control	No overall control hold	Details
Purbeck	Conservative	Conservative hold	Details
Redditch	No overall control	No overall control hold	Details
Reigate and Banstead	Conservative	Conservative hold	Details
Rochford	Conservative	Conservative hold	Details
Rossendale	Labour	No overall control gain	Details
Rugby	No overall control	No overall control hold	Details
Runnymede	Conservative	Conservative hold	Details
Rushmoor	Conservative	Conservative hold	Details
Shrewsbury and Atcham	Conservative	Conservative hold	Details
South Bedfordshire	Conservative	Conservative hold	Details
South Cambridgeshire	No overall control	No overall control hold	Details
South Lakeland	No overall control	No overall control hold	Details
St Albans	No overall control	No overall control hold	Details
Stevenage	Labour	Labour hold	Details
Stratford-on-Avon	No overall control	Conservative gain	Details
Stroud	Conservative	Conservative hold	Details
Swale	Conservative	Conservative hold	Details
Tamworth	Labour	Labour hold	Details
Tandridge	Conservative	Conservative hold	Details
Three Rivers	Liberal Democrats	Liberal Democrats hold	Details
Tunbridge Wells	Conservative	Conservative hold	Details
Watford	No overall control	Liberal Democrats gain	Details
Waveney	No overall control	No overall control hold	Details
Welwyn Hatfield	Conservative	Conservative hold	Details
West Lancashire	Conservative	Conservative hold	Details
West Lindsey	No overall control	No overall control hold	Details
West Oxfordshire	Conservative	Conservative hold	Details
Weymouth and Portland	No overall control	No overall control hold	Details
Winchester	Liberal Democrats	Liberal Democrats hold	Details
Woking	No overall control	No overall control hold	Details
Worcester	No overall control	Conservative gain	Details
Worthing	Liberal Democrats	No overall control gain	Details
Wyre Forest	No overall control	No overall control hold	Details

== Scotland ==
All 32 Scottish unitary authorities held elections. They were held at the same time as the 2003 Scottish Parliament election.

Council area	Previous control	Result	Details
Aberdeen City	No overall control	No overall control hold	Details
Aberdeenshire	No overall control	No overall control hold	Details
Angus	SNP	SNP hold	Details
Argyll and Bute	Independent	Independent hold	Details
Clackmannanshire	SNP	Labour gain	Details
Na h-Eileanan Siar	Independent	Independent hold	Details
Dumfries and Galloway	No overall control	No overall control hold	Details
Dundee City	No overall control	No overall control hold	Details
East Ayrshire	Labour	Labour hold	Details
East Dunbartonshire	No overall control	No overall control hold	Details
East Lothian	Labour	Labour hold	Details
East Renfrewshire	No overall control	No overall control hold	Details
City of Edinburgh	Labour	Labour hold	Details
Falkirk	No overall control	No overall control hold	Details
Fife	No overall control	No overall control hold	Details
Glasgow City	Labour	Labour hold	Details
Highland	Independent	Independent hold	Details
Inverclyde	No overall control	Liberal Democrats gain	Details
Midlothian	Labour	Labour hold	Details
Moray	Independent	Independent hold	Details
North Ayrshire	Labour	Labour hold	Details
North Lanarkshire	Labour	Labour hold	Details
Orkney	Independent	Independent hold	Details
Perth and Kinross	No overall control	No overall control hold	Details
Renfrewshire	No overall control	Labour gain	Details
Scottish Borders	No overall control	No overall control hold	Details
Shetland	Independent	Independent hold	Details
South Ayrshire	Labour	No overall control gain	Details
South Lanarkshire	Labour	Labour hold	Details
Stirling	No overall control	Labour gain	Details
West Dunbartonshire	No overall control	Labour gain	Details
West Lothian	Labour	Labour hold	Details
