= 2003 Dover District Council election =

2003 UK local government election

- 1 May 2003

All 45 seats on Dover District Council 23 seats needed for a majority
	First party	Second party	Third party
Party	Conservative	Labour	Liberal Democrats
Seats won	22	20	3
Popular vote	11,982	9,945	2,916
Percentage	44.8%	37.2%	10.9%
Council control before election
No overall control
Council control after election
No overall control

Elections to Dover District Council in Kent, England were held on 1 May 2003. This was on the same day as other UK local elections. The whole council was up for election and the council remained under no overall control.

== Results by Ward (A-Z) ==
=== Aylesham (2) ===
Aylesham
Party	Candidate	Votes	%
Labour	Helen Bartolo	816	81.3
Labour	Lawrence Knight	783	78.0
Conservative	Sheila Cope	149	14.8
Green	Andrew McLellan	136	13.5
Conservative	Stanley Launder	123	12.3
Turnout		1004	
Labour win		Swing	
Labour win		Swing	
