= 2003 Hertsmere Borough Council election =

2003 UK local government election

- 1 May 2003

13 out of 39 seats to Hertsmere Borough Council 20 seats needed for a majority
- Registered: 69,699
- Turnout: 23.0% (▼9.8%)

	First party	Second party	Third party
Party	Conservative	Labour	Liberal Democrats
Seats won	8	3	2
Seats after	25	8	6
Seat change	Steady	▼1	▲1
Popular vote	8,852	4,698	3,254
Percentage	52.0%	27.6%	19.1%
Swing	▲7.2%	▼0.8%	▼2.9%
- Winner of each seat at the 2003 Hertsmere Borough Council election. Wards in white were not contested.
Control before election
Conservative
Control after election
Conservative

The 2003 Hertsmere Borough Council election took place on 1 May 2003 to elect members of Hertsmere Borough Council in Hertfordshire, England. This was on the same day as other local elections.

One third of the council was up for election and the Conservative Party stayed in overall control of the council.

== Summary ==
=== Background ===
Before the Conservatives ran the council with 25 seats, compared to 9 for Labour and 5 Liberal Democrats. A total of 38 candidates contested the 13 seats that were up for election. Both the Conservative and Labour parties stood in all 13 seats, while there were also 10 Liberal Democrats, 1 Green Party and 1 Socialist Labour Party candidates.

=== Election result ===
The Conservatives maintained an 8-seat majority with 25 councillors, Labour dropped 1 to 8 seats, while the Liberal Democrats gained 1 to 6 seats. The Conservatives gained a seat in Borehamwood Hillside by 98 votes, with Jean Heywood reclaiming a seat on the council after having lost her seat in Borehamwood Cowley Hill in 2002 standing as an independent. However the Liberal Democrats took a seat from the Conservatives in Bushey St James.

The count saw angry words from the Labour group leader Frank Ward, who had held his seat in Borehamwood Kenilworth by just 28 votes. Ward said "Conservative councillors have no place in Borehamwood" and "it was a campaign that was marred by vilification, smears and lies".

2003 Hertsmere Borough Council election
Party	This election			Full council			This election		
Party	Seats	Net	Seats %	Other	Total	Total %	Votes	Votes %	+/−
Conservative	8	Steady	61.5	17	25	64.1	8,852	52.0	+7.2
Labour	3	▼1	23.1	5	8	20.5	4,698	27.6	–0.8
Liberal Democrats	2	▲1	15.4	4	6	15.4	3,254	19.1	–2.9
Socialist Labour	0	Steady	0.0	0	0	0.0	184	1.1	+0.7
Green	0	Steady	0.0	0	0	0.0	41	0.2	–0.3

== Ward results ==
Incumbent councillors standing for re-election are marked with an asterisk (*). Changes in seats do not take into account by-elections or defections.

=== Aldenham East ===
Aldenham East
Party	Candidate	Votes	%	±%
Conservative	Nigel Gilmore	925	79.2	–7.2
Liberal Democrats	Mark Silverman*	122	10.4	N/A
Labour	Raymond Edge	121	10.4	–3.2
Majority		803	68.8	–4.0
Turnout		1,168	34.3	+1.0
Registered electors		3,579		
Conservative hold				

=== Aldenham West ===
Aldenham West
Party	Candidate	Votes	%	±%
Conservative	Neil Payne*	728	69.0	–7.6
Liberal Democrats	David Bird	165	15.6	N/A
Labour	Sandra Huff	162	15.4	–8.0
Majority		563	53.4	+0.2
Turnout		1,055	31.5	–0.3
Registered electors		3,378		
Conservative hold				

=== Borehamwood Brookmeadow ===
Borehamwood Brookmeadow
Party	Candidate	Votes	%	±%
Labour	Leon Reefe*	596	56.2	–4.0
Conservative	David McKee	338	31.9	–7.9
Liberal Democrats	Audrey McCracken	126	11.9	N/A
Majority		258	24.3	+3.9
Turnout		1,060	23.0	–1.4
Registered electors		4,957		
Labour hold		Swing	▲2.0	

=== Borehamwood Cowley Hill ===
Borehamwood Cowley Hill
Party	Candidate	Votes	%	±%
Labour	Craig Adams	826	66.9	+14.0
Conservative	Simon Rubner	224	18.2	N/A
Socialist Labour	James Dry	184	14.9	+9.2
Majority		602	48.8	+37.3
Turnout		1,234	21.7	–8.1
Registered electors		5,743		
Labour hold				

=== Borehamwood Hillside ===
Borehamwood Hillside
Party	Candidate	Votes	%	±%
Conservative	Jean Heywood	838	47.9	–3.9
Labour	Catherine Ward*	743	42.5	–5.7
Liberal Democrats	Patrick Forsyth	169	9.7	N/A
Majority		95	5.4	+1.8
Turnout		1,750	33.5	–1.8
Registered electors		5,878		
Conservative gain from Labour		Swing	▲0.9	

=== Borehamwood Kenilworth ===
Borehamwood Kenilworth
Party	Candidate	Votes	%	±%
Labour	Frank Ward*	349	41.3	–10.8
Conservative	Hannah David	321	38.0	+12.0
Liberal Democrats	Zissis Kakoulakis	175	20.7	N/A
Majority		28	3.3	N/A
Turnout		845	20.6	–1.8
Registered electors		4,138		
Labour hold		Swing	▼11.4	

=== Bushey Heath ===
Bushey Heath
Party	Candidate	Votes	%	±%
Conservative	Michael O'Brien*	865	72.4	+4.9
Liberal Democrats	Roger Kutchinsky	207	17.3	–4.7
Labour	Dinah Hoeksma	122	10.2	–0.3
Majority		658	55.1	+9.6
Turnout		1,194	23.0	–9.0
Registered electors		5,150		
Conservative hold		Swing	▲4.8	

=== Bushey North ===
Bushey North
Party	Candidate	Votes	%	±%
Liberal Democrats	Michael Colne*	899	68.8	+5.8
Conservative	Koyes Choudhury	276	21.1	+0.4
Labour	Christine Sowerbutts	90	6.9	–3.1
Green	Ramiro Alvarado-Vega	41	3.1	–3.2
Majority		623	47.7	+5.4
Turnout		1,306	28.9	–5.7
Registered electors		4,540		
Liberal Democrats hold		Swing	▲2.7	

=== Bushey St. James ===
Bushey St. James
Party	Candidate	Votes	%	±%
Liberal Democrats	Anita Gamble	966	53.2	–5.9
Conservative	Audrey Attwood*	717	39.5	+5.8
Labour	James Sowerbutts	134	7.4	+0.3
Majority		249	13.7	–11.7
Turnout		1,817	33.0	–10.0
Registered electors		5,546		
Liberal Democrats gain from Conservative		Swing	▼5.9	

=== Elstree ===
Elstree
Party	Candidate	Votes	%	±%
Conservative	Morris Bright*	662	72.4	+3.8
Labour	Paula Gregory	252	27.6	+7.7
Majority		410	44.9	–3.9
Turnout		914	26.1	–4.5
Registered electors		3,564		
Conservative hold		Swing	▼2.0	

=== Potters Bar Furzefield ===
Potters Bar Furzefield
Party	Candidate	Votes	%	±%
Conservative	Ronald Morris*	734	58.1	+3.3
Liberal Democrats	Colin Dean	280	22.2	+3.5
Labour	James Fisher	250	19.8	–6.7
Majority		454	35.9	+7.6
Turnout		1,264	26.0	–6.0
Registered electors		4,927		
Conservative hold		Swing	▼0.1	

=== Potters Bar Oakmere ===
Potters Bar Oakmere
Party	Candidate	Votes	%	±%
Conservative	Robert Calcutt*	953	68.9	+6.8
Labour	Ann Harrison	431	31.1	–6.8
Majority		522	37.7	+13.6
Turnout		1,384	24.9	–7.4
Registered electors		5,619		
Conservative hold		Swing	▲6.8	

=== Potters Bar Parkfield ===
Potters Bar Parkfield
Party	Candidate	Votes	%	±%
Conservative	Christopher Dawes*	1,306	70.5	+0.5
Liberal Democrats	Peter Bonner	349	18.8	+6.5
Labour	Elizabeth Savage	197	10.6	–7.1
Majority		957	51.7	–0.6
Turnout		1,852	32.0	–5.0
Registered electors		5,783		
Conservative hold		Swing	▼3.0	
