= 2003 Herefordshire Council election =

2003 UK local government election

Results of the 2003 Herefordshire Council election

Elections to Herefordshire Council were held on 1 May 2003, along with other local elections in England and Scotland. Due to prior boundary reviews, all 38 wards were contested - with each ward electing either one two or three members to the council, with each successful candidate serving a four-year term of office, expiring in 2007. The council remained in no overall control, with the Conservative Party replacing the Liberal Democrats as the largest party on the council, winning 20 out of a total of 56 seats on the council.

== Result ==
Herefordshire Council Election Result 2003
Party	Seats	Gains	Losses	Net gain/loss	Seats %	Votes %	Votes	+/−
Conservative	20			n/c	35.71	31.89	36,515	-10.11
Liberal Democrats	16			-5	28.57	26.50	30,344	-4.90
Independent	15			+8	26.79	28.85	33,028	+15.85
Labour	4			n/c	7.14	6.26	7,172	-0.96
No description	1			+1	1.79	2.38	2,721	New
Green	0			-1	0.00	4.00	4,574	-0.30
UKIP	0			n/c	0.00	0.12	138	New

The overall turnout was 60.80% with a total of 114,492 valid votes cast. A total of 2,808 ballots were rejected.

== Council Composition ==
Prior to the election the composition of the council was:

↓
21	20	7	4	1
Liberal Democrats	Conservative	Independent	Labour	G

After the election, the composition of the council was:

↓
20	16	15	4	1
Conservative	Liberal Democrats	Independent	Labour	NL

G - Green Party
NL - No description

== Ward results ==
Asterisks denote incumbent Councillors seeking re-election. Councillors seeking re-election were first elected in 2000, and these results are therefore compared to that year's polls. All results are listed below:

=== Aylestone ===
Aylestone (2 Seats)
Party	Candidate	Votes	%	±%
Conservative	Denis Brian Wilcox	900	19.69	
Liberal Democrats	Alan Lloyd Williams	873	19.10	
Liberal Democrats	Susan Andrews*	814	17.80	
Conservative	Peter Stanton Berry	614	13.43	
Independent	Diane Margaret Walker	492	10.76	
Independent	James Francis Knipe	448	9.80	
Green	Anna Milne	248	5.42	
Green	Alison Dorothy Harrington	183	4.00	
Majority		59	1.30	
Turnout		4,572	54.05	
Conservative gain from Liberal Democrats		Swing		
Liberal Democrats hold		Swing		

=== Backbury ===
Backbury (1 Seat)
Party	Candidate	Votes	%	±%
Conservative	Josephine Elisabeth Pemberton*	680	48.89	
Liberal Democrats	Patricia Gilbert	521	37.45	
Independent	Graham Ronald Baker	190	13.66	
Majority		159	11.44	
Turnout		1,391	60.52	
Conservative hold		Swing		

=== Belmont ===
Belmont (3 Seats)
Party	Candidate	Votes	%	±%
Independent	Philip James Edwards	1,396	18.26	
Liberal Democrats	John Walter Newman*	1,140	14.91	
Independent	Glenda Ann Powell	992	12.97	
Liberal Democrats	Jacqueline Ann Carwardine	887	11.60	
Liberal Democrats	Kevin John Charles Wargen	808	10.56	
Independent	Arthur Graham Morgan	757	9.90	
Conservative	Susan Diane Trout	467	6.12	
Labour	Barbara Ann Evans	361	4.72	
Labour	John Arthur Hitchin	341	4.46	
Labour	David Stewart Thomson	259	3.39	
Conservative	Allan Bright Lloyd	238	3.11	
Majority		105	1.37	
Turnout		7,646	47.74	
Independent gain from Liberal Democrats		Swing		
Liberal Democrats hold		Swing		
Independent win (new seat)				

=== Bircher ===
Bircher (1 Seat)
Party	Candidate	Votes	%	±%
Independent	William Luis Sebastian Bowen	1,030	65.77	
Conservative	Pauline Robinson	536	34.23	
Majority		494	31.54	
Turnout		1,566	72.51	
Independent gain from Conservative		Swing		

=== Bringsty ===
Bringsty (1 Seat)
Party	Candidate	Votes	%	±%
Conservative	Thomas William Hunt*	598	43.36	
Independent	Joan Anne Dauncey	364	26.40	
Independent	William Albert Gibbard	295	21.39	
Labour	David John Goodman	122	8.85	
Majority		69	5.01	
Turnout		1,379	64.68	
Conservative hold		Swing		

=== Bromyard ===
Bromyard (2 Seats)
Party	Candidate	Votes	%	±%
Independent	Bernard Hunt	768	21.74	
Liberal Democrats	Peter John Dauncey	766	21.68	
Conservative	Richard Edward James*	694	19.64	
Liberal Democrats	Leslie Mervyn Henson Andrews*	578	16.36	
Conservative	Carole Surman	446	12.63	
Independent	John Bernard Haycock	207	5.86	
Independent	Tracy Michael Paton	74	2.09	
Majority		72	2.04	
Turnout		3,533	55.46	
Independent hold		Swing		
Liberal Democrats gain from Conservative		Swing		

Andrews previously served as a cllr for Three Elms. Both Haycock and Paton previously stood as BNP candidates.

=== Burghill, Holmer & Lyde ===
Burghill, Holmer & Lyde (1 Seat)
Party	Candidate	Votes	%	±%
Independent	Sally Jane Robertson	915	58.54	
Conservative	James Richard Makin*	490	31.35	
Liberal Democrats	Mary Ida Short	158	10.11	
Majority		425	27.19	
Turnout		1,563	36.02	
Independent win (new seat)				

Makin previously served as cllr for Dinmore Hill

=== Castle ===
Castle (1 Seat)
Party	Candidate	Votes	%	±%
Conservative	John William Hope	984	59.42	
Independent	Martin Powell	672	40.58	
Majority		872	40.58	
Turnout		1,656	69.80	
Conservative win (new seat)				

=== Central ===
Central (1 Seat)
Party	Candidate	Votes	%	±%
Liberal Democrats	David John Fleet*	373	37.37	
Conservative	Patricia Edith Paul	208	20.84	
Independent	Mark Edward Sayce	151	15.13	
Labour	Harold E Bayley	133	13.33	
Green	David Gillett	133	13.33	
Majority		165	16.53	
Turnout		998	53.74	
Liberal Democrats hold		Swing		

=== Credenhill ===
Credenhill (1 Seat)
Party	Candidate	Votes	%	±%
Independent	Robert Ivor Matthews*	819	55.40	
Liberal Democrats	Crispin Lawrence Mark Abel	459	31.06	
Conservative	Robin Baldry	200	13.54	
Majority		259	17.52	
Turnout		1,478	61.78	
Independent hold		Swing		

=== Frome ===
Frome (1 Seat)
Party	Candidate	Votes	%	±%
Conservative	Robert Michael Manning	792	46.67	
Green	Guy Harry Morgan Woodford*	767	45.20	
UKIP	Christopher Rupert Kingsley	138	8.13	
Majority		25	1.47	
Turnout		1,697	70.46	
Conservative gain from Green		Swing		

=== Golden Cross with Weobley ===
Golden Cross with Weobley (1 Seat)
Party	Candidate	Votes	%	±%
Conservative	John Hutcheson Ruell Goodwin*	809	50.69	
Liberal Democrats	Lucy Ann Hurds	632	39.60	
Independent	Stephen David Grist	155	9.71	
Majority		177	11.09	
Turnout		1,596	68.78	
Conservative win (new seat)				

Cllr Goodwin previously served as councillor for Weobley.

=== Golden Valley North ===
Golden Valley North (1 Seat)
Party	Candidate	Votes	%	±%
Conservative	Nigel John James Davies	526	36.33	
Independent	Brendan Charles Treanor	467	32.25	
Liberal Democrats	June Margaret Pickering	455	31.42	
Majority		59	4.08	
Turnout		1,448	65.98	
Conservative win (new seat)				

Cllr Davies previously served as councillor for Merbach.

=== Golden Valley South ===
Golden Valley South (1 Seat)
Party	Candidate	Votes	%	±%
Independent	John Berisford Williams	628	41.78	
Liberal Democrats	Jennifer Mary Houston	504	33.53	
Conservative	Raymond Maxwell Chillington	371	24.69	
Majority		124	8.25	
Turnout		1,503	67.80	
Independent win (new seat)				

=== Hagley ===
Hagley (1 Seat)
Party	Candidate	Votes	%	±%
Independent	Robert Michael Wilson	607	41.75	
Conservative	David William Greenow	503	34.59	
Liberal Democrats	Alexander Paul George Wenyon	344	23.66	
Majority		104	7.16	
Turnout		1,454	58.31	
Independent gain from Liberal Democrats		Swing		

=== Hampton Court ===
Hampton Court (1 Seat)
Party	Candidate	Votes	%	±%
Conservative	Keith Gordon Grumbley	660	46.48	
Liberal Democrats	Michael John Kimbery*	485	34.15	
Independent	Edward George Bevan	275	19.37	
Majority		175	12.33	
Turnout		1,420	67.98	
Conservative gain from Liberal Democrats		Swing		

=== Hollington ===
Hollington (1 Seat)
Party	Candidate	Votes	%	±%
Liberal Democrats	William John Stuart Thomas*	351	35.28	
Independent	Gerald Dawe	259	26.03	
Independent	Audrey Jennifer Layton	247	24.82	
Conservative	Phillip Bernard Howells	138	13.87	
Majority		92	9.25	
Turnout		995	67.77	
Liberal Democrats hold		Swing		

=== Hope End ===
Hope End (2 Seats)
Party	Candidate	Votes	%	±%
Conservative	Roy Vincent Stockton*	1,554	30.71	
Conservative	Rees Mills*	1,469	29.03	
Liberal Democrats	Terence Leonard Kimberley White	785	15.52	
Green	Katrina Emma Turnbull	681	13.46	
Green	Mark Robert Davies	571	11.28	
Majority		684	13.51	
Turnout		5,060	64.47	
Conservative hold		Swing		
Conservative hold		Swing		

=== Kerne Bridge ===
Kerne Bridge (1 Seat)
Party	Candidate	Votes	%	±%
Independent	Ruth Frances Lincoln	863	66.59	
Conservative	James Hinton Alexander	433	33.41	
Majority		430	33.18	
Turnout		1,296	55.60	
Independent win (new seat)				

=== Kington Town ===
Kington Town (1 Seat)
Party	Candidate	Votes	%	±%
Liberal Democrats	Terence Morgan James	576	38.10	
Independent	Allan William Lloyd	550	36.37	
Conservative	Elizabeth Christine Shayler	386	25.53	
Majority		26	1.73	
Turnout		1,512	67.19	
Liberal Democrats win (new seat)				

Cllr James previously served as councillor for Kington.

=== Ledbury ===
Ledbury (3 Seats)
Party	Candidate	Votes	%	±%
Independent	Donald William Rule*	1,791	19.16	
Conservative	Peter Edward Harling*	1.762	18.85	
Liberal Democrats	Barry Frank Ashton*	1,496	16.00	
Independent	Michael Holcroft	1,272	13.61	
Conservative	Mary Edna Cooper	1,186	12.69	
	Jacqueline Kay Swinburne	982	10.50	
Conservative	Jonathan Richard Mills	859	9.19	
Majority		224	2.39	
Turnout		9,348	57.54	
Independent win (new seat)				
Conservative hold		Swing		
Liberal Democrats hold		Swing		

This ward previously only elected two members to the council. Both Cllrs Harling and Ashton served in the Ledbury ward, whilst Cllr Rule served as a councillor for Marcle Ridge.

=== Leominster North ===
Leominster North (2 Seats)
Party	Candidate	Votes	%	±%
Conservative	June Patricia French	996	26.65	
Conservative	Peter Jones	995	26.63	
Labour	Peter John Goody	527	14.10	
Labour	Pamela Anne Smith	443	11.86	
Independent	Patricia Catherine Hales	401	10.73	
Independent	David Athelstan Romilly Martin	375	10.03	
Majority		468	12.53	
Turnout		3,737	49.29	
Conservative hold		Swing		
Conservative hold		Swing		

=== Leominster South ===
Leominster South (2 Seats)
Party	Candidate	Votes	%	±%
Conservative	Dick Burke*	1,082	25.69	
Labour	John Parry Thomas*	880	20.89	
Conservative	Catherine Mary Fothergill	673	15.98	
Labour	Ann Elizabeth Leedham-Smith	364	8.64	
Green	Julie Anne Howard Haslam	313	7.43	
Independent	Susan Elizabeth Wright	305	7.24	
Liberal Democrats	Ashley James Bowkett	304	7.22	
Green	Joan Thwaites	291	6.91	
Majority		207	4.91	
Turnout		53.73	4,212	
Conservative win (new seat)				
Labour win (new seat)				

Both Cllrs Burke and Thomas previously served as councillors for Leominster East & South prior to the election.

=== Llangarron ===
Llangarron (1 Seat)
Party	Candidate	Votes	%	±%
Conservative	Jennifer Ann Hyde	755	51.33	
Independent	Tony Dudfield	446	30.32	
Liberal Democrats	Lorraine Fletcher	270	18.35	
Majority		309	21.01	
Turnout		1,471	60.83	
Conservative win (new seat)				

=== Mortimer ===
Mortimer (1 Seat)
Party	Candidate	Votes	%	±%
Conservative	Lillian Olwyn Barnett*	942	62.14	
Green	John Charlton Gaunt	222	14.64	
Independent	Steve Dawson	209	13.79	
Labour	John Ernest Howard Smith	143	9.43	
Majority		720	47.50	
Turnout		1,516	66.41	
Conservative hold		Swing		

=== Old Gore ===
Old Gore (1 Seat)
Party	Candidate	Votes	%	±%
Independent	John William Edwards*	871	60.15	
Conservative	Charles Nigel Kenyon	577	39.85	
Majority		294	20.30	
Turnout		1,448	64.18	
Independent hold		Swing		

=== Penyard ===
Penyard (1 Seat)
Party	Candidate	Votes	%	±%
Conservative	Harry Bramer	892	53.19	
Independent	Eunice May Saunders*	785	46.81	
Majority		107	6.38	
Turnout		1,677	69.39	
Conservative gain from Independent		Swing		

=== Pontrilas ===
Pontrilas (1 Seat)
Party	Candidate	Votes	%	±%
Independent	Godfrey William Davis	904	54.16	
Conservative	Anthony Robert Phillips	765	45.84	
Majority		139	8.32	
Turnout		1,669	65.34	
Independent win (new seat)				

=== Ross-on-Wye East ===
Ross-on-Wye East (2 Seats)
Party	Candidate	Votes	%	±%
Independent	Anne Elizabeth Gray	921	28.43	
Liberal Democrats	Cynthia Joyce Davis*	904	27.90	
Conservative	Nigel Thomas Gibbs	711	21.94	
Liberal Democrats	Derek Bedford	704	21.73	
Majority		193	5.96	
Turnout		3,240	56.04	
Independent hold		Swing		
Liberal Democrats hold		Swing		

=== Ross-on-Wye West ===
Ross-on-Wye West (2 Seats)
Party	Candidate	Votes	%	±%
Liberal Democrats	Mark Robert Cunningham*	746	19.03	
Conservative	Gordon Lucas	736	18.77	
Liberal Democrats	Anthony John Allen*	709	18.09	
Conservative	Phillip Grenfell Haydn Cutter	653	16.66	
Independent	Marilyn Ann Teague	653	16.66	
Independent	John William Davies	423	10.79	
Majority		27	0.68	
Turnout		3,920	51.71	
Liberal Democrats hold		Swing		
Conservative gain from Liberal Democrats		Swing		

=== St. Martins & Hinton ===
St. Martins & Hinton (3 Seats))
Party	Candidate	Votes	%	±%
Labour	Arthur Christopher Richard Chappell*	1,265	14.26	
Labour	Robert Preece*	1,222	13.77	
Labour	Winefride Ursula Attfield*	1,152	12.98	
Liberal Democrats	Aubrey Thomas Oliver	1,035	11.67	
Liberal Democrats	Peter John Cecchetto	909	10.24	
Liberal Democrats	Catherine Linda Diane Griffiths	811	9.14	
Independent	Mark Rone	693	7.81	
Conservative	Martha Ann Ball	604	6.81	
Independent	Janice Cindy Reid	486	5.48	
Conservative	Carol Ellen Courtenay Cranch	397	4.47	
Independent	Anthony Ronald Capon	299	3.37	
Majority		117	1.31	
Turnout		8,873	48.42	
Labour win (new seat)				
Labour win (new seat)				
Labour win (new seat)				

Cllrs Chappell and Attfield previously served as councillors for Hinton ward, and Cllr Preece served as a councillor for St. Martins prior to the election.

=== St. Nicholas ===
St. Nicholas (2 Seats)
Party	Candidate	Votes	%	±%
Liberal Democrats	Evaline Mary Bew*	1,105	24.88	
Liberal Democrats	David Cyril Short*	1,013	22.81	
Independent	Julie Diane Woodward	840	18.92	
Conservative	John Hodges	534	12.02	
Conservative	David Brian Ellis	491	11.06	
Independent	Patrick Henry James	458	10.31	
Majority		173	3.89	
Turnout		4,441	52.59	
Liberal Democrats hold		Swing		
Liberal Democrats hold		Swing		

=== Stoney Street ===
Stoney Street (1 Seat)
Party	Candidate	Votes	%	±%
No description	David Charles Taylor	636	47.46	
Conservative	Marsha Elizabeth Barnsley	320	23.88	
Independent	Michael John Rogers	276	20.60	
Liberal Democrats	Michael Roy Dando	108	8.06	
Majority		316	23.58	
Turnout		1,340	63.32	
Independent win (new seat)				

=== Sutton Walls ===
Sutton Walls (1 Seat)
Party	Candidate	Votes	%	±%
Conservative	John Gerrans Stuart Guthrie*	612	42.80	
Liberal Democrats	Roland Charles Summers	566	39.58	
	John Paul Amor	252	17.62	
Majority		46	3.22	
Turnout		1,430	62.97	
Conservative win (new seat)				

Cllr Guthrie previously served as the councillor for Brumarsh prior to the election.

=== Three Elms ===
Three Elms (3 Seats)
Party	Candidate	Votes	%	±%
Liberal Democrats	Paulina Averil Andrews	1,491	15.18	
Liberal Democrats	Anna Maria Toon	1,297	13.20	
Liberal Democrats	Sylvia Petula Ann Daniels	1,156	11.77	
Independent	Peter Derwent Evans	1,074	10.94	
Independent	David John Benjamin	919	9.36	
Conservative	Jason Hankins	867	8.83	
Conservative	Arthur George Staton	802	8.17	
Conservative	Marion Kathleen Luscombe	773	7.87	
Independent	Tracy Wood	724	7.37	
Independent	Malcolm Thomas Hankins	718	7.31	
Majority		82	0.83	
Turnout		9,821	49.47	
Liberal Democrats gain from Conservative		Swing		
Liberal Democrats hold		Swing		
Liberal Democrats win (new seat)				

=== Tupsley ===
Tupsley (3 Seats)
Party	Candidate	Votes	%	±%
	Marcelle Denise Lloyd	1,544	15.51	
Independent	George Vincent Hyde	1,305	13.11	
Liberal Democrats	William James Walling	1,275	12.80	
Liberal Democrats	Basil Cuthbert Baldwin	1,155	11.60	
Conservative	Henry Ball	1,041	10.45	
Conservative	Jane Ann Carter*	1,039	10.43	
	Guy Griffiths	851	8.55	
Independent	Stephen Patrick Davies	583	5.85	
Green	Robert Milne	480	4.82	
Green	Anthony Charles Shoring	387	3.89	
Green	Agnes Mary Glen-Bott	298	2.99	
Majority		120	1.20	
Turnout		9,958	57.50	
Liberal Democrats hold		Swing		
Liberal Democrats gain from Conservative		Swing		
Liberal Democrats win (new seat)				

=== Valletts ===
Valletts (1 Seat)
Party	Candidate	Votes	%	±%
Independent	Philip Guy Turpin	1,048	73.75	
Conservative	Robert Anthony Jones	373	26.25	
Majority		675	47.50	
Turnout		1,421	59.93	
Independent win (new seat)				

=== Wormsley Ridge ===
Wormsley Ridge (1 Seat)
Party	Candidate	Votes	%	±%
Independent	John Charles Mayson	628	50.24	
Conservative	Judith George	381	30.48	
Liberal Democrats	Lionel John Meredith	241	19.28	
Majority		247	19.76	
Turnout		1,250	64.41	
Independent win (new seat)				
