= 2003 Huntingdonshire District Council election =

2003 UK local government election

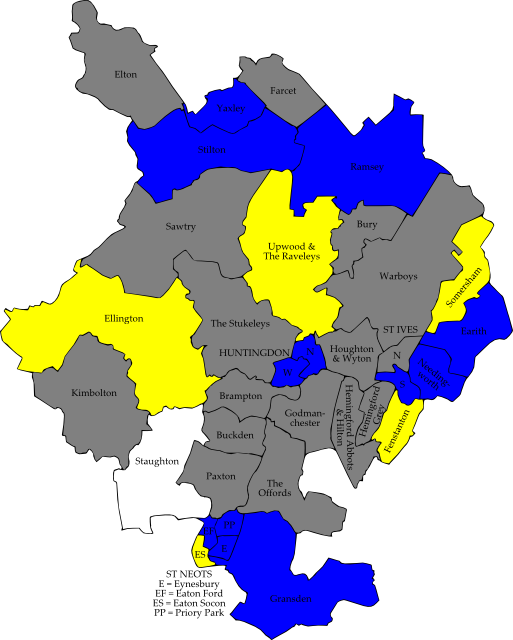
Map of the results of the 2003 Huntingdonshire District Council election. Conservatives in blue, Liberal Democrats in yellow and independents in white. Wards in grey were not contested in 2003.

The 2003 Huntingdonshire District Council election took place on 1 May 2003 to elect members of Huntingdonshire District Council in Cambridgeshire, England. One third of the council was up for election and the Conservative Party stayed in overall control of the council.

After the election, the composition of the council was:

- Conservative 36
- Liberal Democrats 14
- Independent 3

== Election result ==
Huntingdonshire local election result 2003
Party	Seats	Gains	Losses	Net gain/loss	Seats %	Votes %	Votes	+/−
Conservative	12	1	1	0	66.7	50.7	11,156	+4.6%
Liberal Democrats	5	1	1	0	27.8	37.2	8,179	-0.3%
Independent	1	0	0	0	5.6	1.5	333	-3.1%
Labour	0	0	0	0	0	10.6	2,325	-1.1%

== Ward results ==
Earith
Party	Candidate	Votes	%	±%
Conservative	John Eddy	543	53.1	−1.0
Liberal Democrats	Owen McLaughlin	380	37.2	−3.2
Labour	Carol Harper	99	9.7	+4.2
Majority		163	15.9	+2.2
Turnout		1,022	30.7	−1.6
Conservative hold		Swing		

Ellington
Party	Candidate	Votes	%	±%
Liberal Democrats	Michael Baker	626	64.3	+12.2
Conservative	Joan Meiklejohn	310	31.8	−12.8
Labour	David Brown	38	3.9	+0.6
Majority		316	32.4	+24.9
Turnout		974	53.0	−1.2
Liberal Democrats hold		Swing		

Fenstanton
Party	Candidate	Votes	%	±%
Liberal Democrats	Mark Rainer	424	57.5	+1.2
Conservative	David Mead	275	37.3	−0.1
Labour	Angela Richards	39	5.3	−1.0
Majority		149	20.2	+1.2
Turnout		738	33.2	−7.1
Liberal Democrats hold		Swing		

Gransden
Party	Candidate	Votes	%	±%
Conservative	Barbara Boddington	454	54.8	−18.9
Liberal Democrats	Paul Jose	343	41.4	+22.9
Labour	Karen Webb	31	3.7	−4.1
Majority		111	13.4	−41.7
Turnout		828	38.6	+2.5
Conservative hold		Swing		

Huntingdon North
Party	Candidate	Votes	%	±%
Conservative	Lawrence Simpson	910	53.6	−0.9
Liberal Democrats	David Priestman	446	26.3	+8.3
Labour	Ruth Pugh	342	20.1	−7.4
Majority		464	27.3	+0.3
Turnout		1,698	24.3	−0.4
Conservative hold		Swing		

Huntingdon West
Party	Candidate	Votes	%	±%
Conservative	Thomas Sanderson	1,126	51.1	+2.5
Liberal Democrats	Justin Meadows	708	32.1	+10.6
Labour	Ann Beevor	369	16.7	−13.2
Majority		418	19.0	+0.2
Turnout		2,203	30.2	+8.0
Conservative hold		Swing		

Needingworth
Party	Candidate	Votes	%	±%
Conservative	Paul Brant	358	63.5	+17.4
Liberal Democrats	Malcolm Robelou	134	23.8	+23.8
Labour	Sharon Nania	72	12.8	+3.7
Majority		224	39.7	+38.4
Turnout		564	29.0	−13.1
Conservative hold		Swing		

Ramsey
Party	Candidate	Votes	%	±%
Conservative	Phillip Swales	954	58.5	+8.8
Liberal Democrats	Janet Dutton	678	41.5	−8.8
Majority		276	17.0	
Turnout		1,632	27.0	−1.6
Conservative hold		Swing		

Somersham
Party	Candidate	Votes	%	±%
Liberal Democrats	Anthony Hulme	615	54.2	+4.8
Conservative	Stephen Criswell	473	41.7	−2.2
Labour	Susan Coomey	46	4.1	−2.5
Majority		142	12.5	+7.0
Turnout		1,134	40.1	+2.2
Liberal Democrats hold		Swing		

St. Ives South
Party	Candidate	Votes	%	±%
Conservative	Douglas Dew	928	50.6	−8.4
Liberal Democrats	David Hodge	779	42.5	+9.6
Labour	Richard Allen	127	6.9	−1.1
Majority		149	8.1	−18.0
Turnout		1,834	34.1	−5.3
Conservative hold		Swing		

St. Neots Eaton Ford
Party	Candidate	Votes	%	±%
Conservative	David Harty	673	49.6	−17.4
Liberal Democrats	Derek Cooper	601	44.3	+20.0
Labour	Graham Hitchings	83	6.1	−2.6
Majority		72	5.3	−37.5
Turnout		1,357	34.0	+3.2
Conservative hold		Swing		

St. Neots Eaton Socon
Party	Candidate	Votes	%	±%
Liberal Democrats	Derek Giles	903	63.8	+8.3
Conservative	Robert Law	417	29.5	−8.5
Labour	David Nicholls	95	6.7	+0.2
Majority		486	34.3	+16.8
Turnout		1,415	25.7	−1.4
Liberal Democrats hold		Swing		

St. Neots Eynesbury
Party	Candidate	Votes	%	±%
Conservative	Paul Ursell	628	44.0	−0.6
Liberal Democrats	Ian Taylor	591	41.4	+1.1
Labour	Patricia Nicholls	209	14.6	−0.5
Majority		37	2.6	−1.7
Turnout		1,428	23.0	−3.5
Conservative hold		Swing		

St. Neots Priory Park
Party	Candidate	Votes	%	±%
Conservative	Paula Longford	916	65.7	+14.0
Liberal Democrats	Lesley Collins	352	25.3	−16.6
Labour	William O'Connor	126	9.0	+2.6
Majority		564	40.5	+30.7
Turnout		1,394	33.7	−3.6
Conservative gain from Liberal Democrats		Swing		

Staughton
Party	Candidate	Votes	%	±%
Independent	Archibald "Hugh" Duberly	333	46.1	−17.8
Conservative	William Sinclair	249	34.4	+15.4
Liberal Democrats	Malcolm Howlett	88	12.2	+2.0
Labour	Carole Hitchings	53	7.3	+0.4
Majority		84	11.6	−33.2
Turnout		723	34.5	−18.4
Independent hold		Swing		

Stilton
Party	Candidate	Votes	%	±%
Conservative	Peter Mitchell	788	73.6	+7.9
Liberal Democrats	John Davidson	168	15.7	+15.7
Labour	Graeme Watkins	114	10.7	−23.6
Majority		620	57.9	+26.6
Turnout		1,070	32.6	−4.7
Conservative hold		Swing		

Upwood and The Raveleys
Party	Candidate	Votes	%	±%
Liberal Democrats	John Souter	343	50.0	+18.0
Conservative	John Bell	316	46.1	−9.6
Labour	Margaret Cochrane	27	3.9	−8.4
Majority		27	3.9	N/A
Turnout		686	46.9	+10.6
Liberal Democrats gain from Conservative		Swing		

Yaxley
Party	Candidate	Votes	%	±%
Conservative	John Watt	838	64.8	+8.5
Labour	Kevin Goddard	455	35.2	−8.5
Majority		383	29.6	+17.1
Turnout		1,293	22.2	−4.8
Conservative hold		Swing		
