= 2003 Rossendale Borough Council election =

2003 UK local government election

Elections to Rossendale Borough Council were held on 1 May 2003. One third of the council was up for election and the Labour party lost overall control of the council to no overall control.

After the election, the composition of the council was:

- Labour 17
- Conservative 17
- Liberal Democrat 1
- Independent 1

== Election result ==
Rossendale local election result 2003
| Party | Seats | Gains | Losses | Net gain/loss | Seats % | Votes % | Votes | +/− |
|---|---|---|---|---|---|---|---|---|
| Conservative | 9 | 5 | 0 | +5 | 75.0 | 50.8 | 6,753 | +6.1% |
| Labour | 2 | 0 | 6 | -6 | 16.7 | 39.5 | 5,248 | -14.1% |
| Liberal Democrats | 1 | 1 | 0 | +1 | 8.3 | 9.8 | 1,299 | +9.8% |

== Ward results ==
Cribden
| Party | Candidate | Votes | % | ±% |
|---|---|---|---|---|
| Liberal Democrats | Philip Young | 285 | 34.5 | |
| Labour | Hugh McCaw | 274 | 33.2 | |
| Conservative | Kenneth Slaughter | 266 | 32.2 | |
| Majority | | 11 | 1.3 | |
| Turnout | | 825 | 30.4 | |
| Liberal Democrats gain from Labour | | Swing | | |

Facit and Shawforth
| Party | Candidate | Votes | % | ±% |
|---|---|---|---|---|
| Conservative | Hazel Steen | 422 | 53.1 | |
| Labour | Thomas Aldred | 372 | 46.9 | |
| Majority | | 50 | 6.2 | |
| Turnout | | 794 | 28.2 | |
| Conservative gain from Labour | | Swing | | |

Greenfield (2 seats)
| Party | Candidate | Votes | % | ±% |
|---|---|---|---|---|
| Conservative | Peter Starkey | 678 | | |
| Conservative | Alison Tickner | 644 | | |
| Liberal Democrats | Catherine Long | 540 | | |
| Labour | Dorothy Atkinson | 335 | | |
| Labour | Jennifer Shilliday | 236 | | |
| Turnout | | 2,433 | 33.6 | |
| Conservative hold | | Swing | | |
| Conservative hold | | Swing | | |

Greensclough
| Party | Candidate | Votes | % | ±% |
|---|---|---|---|---|
| Conservative | William Challinor | 693 | 55.7 | |
| Labour | Bernadette O'Connor | 551 | 44.3 | |
| Majority | | 142 | 11.4 | |
| Turnout | | 1,244 | 30.4 | |
| Conservative hold | | Swing | | |

Hareholme
| Party | Candidate | Votes | % | ±% |
|---|---|---|---|---|
| Labour | Trevor Unsworth | 661 | 50.4 | |
| Conservative | Susan Popland | 650 | 49.6 | |
| Majority | | 11 | 0.8 | |
| Turnout | | 1,311 | 31.3 | |
| Labour hold | | Swing | | |

Healey and Whitworth
| Party | Candidate | Votes | % | ±% |
|---|---|---|---|---|
| Conservative | David Barnes | 404 | 54.4 | |
| Labour | Ronald Pickup | 338 | 45.6 | |
| Majority | | 66 | 8.8 | |
| Turnout | | 742 | 26.7 | |
| Conservative gain from Labour | | Swing | | |

Helmshore
| Party | Candidate | Votes | % | ±% |
|---|---|---|---|---|
| Conservative | Barry Pawson | 694 | 49.2 | |
| Labour | Stuart Brannigan | 473 | 33.5 | |
| Liberal Democrats | James Pilling | 244 | 17.3 | |
| Majority | | 221 | 15.7 | |
| Turnout | | 1,411 | 31.9 | |
| Conservative gain from Labour | | Swing | | |

Irwell
| Party | Candidate | Votes | % | ±% |
|---|---|---|---|---|
| Conservative | Peter Steen | 566 | 57.6 | |
| Labour | William Pearson | 416 | 42.4 | |
| Majority | | 150 | 15.2 | |
| Turnout | | 982 | 27.5 | |
| Conservative hold | | Swing | | |

Longholme
| Party | Candidate | Votes | % | ±% |
|---|---|---|---|---|
| Conservative | Emily Haworth | 559 | 50.4 | |
| Labour | Denise Hancock | 551 | 49.6 | |
| Majority | | 8 | 0.8 | |
| Turnout | | 1,110 | 27.5 | |
| Conservative gain from Labour | | Swing | | |

Whitewell
| Party | Candidate | Votes | % | ±% |
|---|---|---|---|---|
| Labour | Amanda Robertson | 646 | 50.8 | |
| Conservative | Christopher Wadsworth | 625 | 49.2 | |
| Majority | | 21 | 1.6 | |
| Turnout | | 1,271 | 30.2 | |
| Labour hold | | Swing | | |

Worsley
| Party | Candidate | Votes | % | ±% |
|---|---|---|---|---|
| Conservative | Joyce Thorne | 552 | 46.9 | |
| Labour | Adrian Lythgoe | 395 | 33.6 | |
| Liberal Democrats | Paul Marx | 230 | 19.5 | |
| Majority | | 157 | 13.3 | |
| Turnout | | 1,177 | 27.7 | |
| Conservative gain from Labour | | Swing | | |
