= 2003 Wyre Borough Council election =

2003 UK local government election

Results of the 2003 Wyre Borough Council election

Elections to Wyre Borough Council were held on 5 May 2003. All 55 councillors were elected from 26 wards in elections held every four years. The Conservative Party kept hold overall control of the council. For this election boundary changes had taken place which resulted in reducing the number of seats by one.

After the election composition of the council was as follows:

Party	Seats	±
Conservative	33	-2
Labour	21	+2
Liberal Democrat	1	-1

== Election result ==
Wyre Borough Council Election, 2003
Party	Seats	Gains	Losses	Net gain/loss	Seats %	Votes %	Votes	+/−
Conservative	33			-12	60.00	50.09	15,648	
Labour	21			+2	38.18	38.51	12,031	
Liberal Democrats	1			-1	1.82	9.00	2,813	
Independent	0	0	0	0	0.00	2.40	750	

== Ward results ==
=== Bourne ===
Bourne (3 Councillors)
Party	Candidate	Votes	%	±%
Labour	Terence Lees	692	26.43	
Labour	Anne Hall	667	25.48	
Labour	John Condron	659	25.17	
Conservative	Corinne Roberts	600	22.92	
Turnout				

=== Breck ===
Breck (2 Councillors)
Party	Candidate	Votes	%	±%
Conservative	Harry Taylor	669	36.34	
Conservative	Francis Carroll	646	35.09	
Labour	Alan Dawkins	276	14.99	
Labour	Peter Elliott	250	13.58	
Turnout				

=== Brock ===
Brock (1 Councillor)
Party	Candidate	Votes	%	±%
Conservative	Pete Murphy	425	69.44	
Liberal Democrats	David Thompson	187	30.56	
Majority		238	38.89	
Turnout		612		

=== Cabus ===
Cabus (1 Councillor)
Party	Candidate	Votes	%	±%
Conservative	Roger Brooks	364	54.74	
Labour	Marilyn Levey	301	45.26	
Majority		63	9.47	
Turnout		665		

=== Calder ===
Calder (1 Councillor)
Party	Candidate	Votes	%	±%
Conservative	David Williams	292	52.24	
Liberal Democrats	Jack Rogers	267	47.76	
Majority		25	4.47	
Turnout		559		

=== Carleton ===
Carleton (2 Councillors)
Party	Candidate	Votes	%	±%
Conservative	James Hargeaves	677	28.99	
Conservative	Frances Gandhi	669	28.65	
Labour	Jane Jackson	511	21.88	
Labour	Andrew Walker	478	20.47	
Turnout				

=== Catterall ===
Catterall (1 Councillor)
Party	Candidate	Votes	%	±%
Liberal Democrats	David Sharples	532	68.91	
Conservative	Valerie Wilson	240	31.09	
Majority		292	37.82	
Turnout		772		

=== Cleveleys Park ===
Cleveleys Park (3 Councillors)
Party	Candidate	Votes	%	±%
Labour	Penelope Martin	862	17.06	
Labour	Wayne Martin	854	16.90	
Labour	John Traynor	852	16.86	
Conservative	Arthur Brooks	750	14.84	
Conservative	William Rogerson	730	14.45	
Conservative	Ernest Smith	693	13.71	
Liberal Democrats	Jean Taylor	312	6.17	
Turnout				

=== Garstang ===
Garstang (3 Councillors)
Party	Candidate	Votes	%	±%
Conservative	Dulcie Atkins	1,066	23.03	
Conservative	Elizabeth Collinson	923	19.94	
Conservative	Thomas Balmain	912	19.70	
Liberal Democrats	Paul Harrison	693	14.97	
Liberal Democrats	Francis Purkins	590	12.75	
Labour	Stanley Harvey	445	9.61	
Turnout				

=== Great Eccleston ===
Great Eccleston (2 Councillors)
Party	Candidate	Votes	%	±%
Conservative	Alfred Coop	815	46.95	
Conservative	Thomas Pimbley	688	39.63	
Labour	David Swift	233	13.42	
Turnout				

=== Hambleton & Stalmine-with-Staynall ===
Hambleton & Stalmine-with-Staynall (2 Councillors)
Party	Candidate	Votes	%	±%
Conservative	John Dickinson	878	31.11	
Conservative	Lynn Bowen	797	28.24	
Labour	Roger Cameron	599	21.23	
Labour	Margaret Jackson	548	19.42	
Turnout				

=== Hardhorn ===
Hardhorn (2 Councillors)
Party	Candidate	Votes	%	±%
Conservative	Graeme Cocker	787	36.28	
Conservative	Frank Turner	730	33.66	
Labour	Richard Barnes	336	15.49	
Labour	Eileen Pacey-Patrick	316	14.57	
Turnout				

=== Highcross ===
Highcross (2 Councillors)
Party	Candidate	Votes	%	±%
Conservative	Maurice Richardson	787	30.16	
Conservative	Daniel Penswick	752	28.82	
Labour	Alphonse Robert	553	21.20	
Labour	Eric Stafford	517	19.82	
Turnout				

=== Jubilee ===
Jubilee (2 Councillors)
Party	Candidate	Votes	%	±%
Conservative	Alan Heppenstall	530	26.33	
Conservative	John Hodgkinson	501	24.89	
Labour	Kathleen Condron	499	24.79	
Labour	Graham Robinson	483	23.99	
Turnout				

=== Mount ===
Mount (2 Councillors)
Party	Candidate	Votes	%	±%
Labour	Ian Duffy	596	29.93	
Labour	Ruth Duffy	572	28.73	
Conservative	Mark Hamer	456	22.90	
Conservative	Carole Bonham	367	18.43	
Turnout				

=== Norcross ===
Norcross (2 Councillors)
Party	Candidate	Votes	%	±%
Labour	David Twizell	503	26.46	
Labour	Peter Smith	477	25.09	
Conservative	John Shedwick	470	24.72	
Conservative	Leonard Jolley	451	23.72	
Turnout				

=== Park ===
Park (2 Councillors)
Party	Candidate	Votes	%	±%
Labour	Stanley Leadbetter	673	38.04	
Labour	Geoffrey Horrocks	603	34.09	
Conservative	Kathleen Vincent	261	14.75	
Conservative	Catherine Rogerson	232	13.11	
Turnout				

=== Pharos ===
Pharos (3 Councillors)
Party	Candidate	Votes	%	±%
Labour	Lorraine Beavers	946	26.20	
Labour	Clive Grunshaw	927	25.67	
Labour	Ronald Shewan	905	25.06	
Conservative	Margaret Grant	249	6.90	
Conservative	Graham Cooke	206	5.70	
Conservative	Michael Vincent	195	5.40	
Liberal Democrats	Kenneth Palmerton	183	5.07	
Turnout				

=== Pilling ===
Pilling (1 Councillor)
Party	Candidate	Votes	%	±%
Conservative	Donald Lawrenson	342	52.13	
Liberal Democrats	Neil Thompson	314	47.87	
Majority		28	4.27	
Turnout		656		

=== Preesall ===
Preesall (3 Councillors)
Party	Candidate	Votes	%	±%
Conservative	Ian McCann	1,012	22.28	
Conservative	Paul Moon	936	20.60	
Conservative	Vivien Taylor	935	20.58	
Independent	Thomas Hudson	750	16.51	
Labour	Nicholas Fogg	498	10.96	
Labour	Brian Stephenson	412	9.07	
Turnout				

=== Rossall ===
Rossall (3 Councillors)
Party	Candidate	Votes	%	±%
Labour	Marlene Colby	953	22.71	
Labour	Vincent Riley	950	22.64	
Labour	Edwn Taylor	886	21.11	
Conservative	Harry King	486	11.58	
Conservative	Frances Thewlis	463	11.03	
Conservative	Kathleen Walker	459	10.94	
Turnout				

=== Staina ===
Staina (3 Councillors)
Party	Candidate	Votes	%	±%
Conservative	William Forsyth	941	18.97	
Conservative	Ralph Lawrenson	934	18.83	
Conservative	Ramesh Gandhi	931	18.77	
Labour	Thomas Rawlings	736	14.84	
Labour	David Oxley	712	14.35	
Labour	Richard Anyon	707	14.25	
Turnout				

=== Tithebarn ===
Tithebarn (2 Councillors)
Party	Candidate	Votes	%	±%
Conservative	David Bannister	781	35.40	
Conservative	Peter Hawley	752	34.09	
Labour	Alan Morgan	341	15.46	
Labour	Christopher Frost	332	15.05	
Turnout				

=== Victoria ===
Victoria (3 Councillors)
Party	Candidate	Votes	%	±%
Conservative	Keith Tebbs	839	20.30	
Conservative	Rita Amos	828	20.03	
Conservative	Alan Vincent	779	18.85	
Labour	Fred Greenhalgh	615	14.88	
Labour	Christopher Brooks	545	13.19	
Labour	Paul Meehan	527	12.75	
Turnout				

=== Warren ===
Warren (3 Councillors)
Party	Candidate	Votes	%	±%
Labour	Margaret Anderton	863	21.26	
Labour	Irene Robinson	821	20.22	
Labour	George Irish	777	19.14	
Conservative	Andrea Whitehouse	562	13.84	
Conservative	Roger Berry	546	13.45	
Conservative	William Proctor	491	12.09	
Turnout				

=== Wyresdale ===
Wyresdale (1 Councillor)
Party	Candidate	Votes	%	±%
Conservative	Richard Collinson	369	53.17	
Liberal Democrats	Hazel Ronson	325	46.83	
Majority		44	6.34	
Turnout		694		
