= 2003 East Dorset District Council election =

2003 UK local government election

Map of the results of the 2003 East Dorset District Council election. Conservatives in blue, Liberal Democrats in yellow and independent in grey.

The 2003 East Dorset District Council election took place on 1 May 2003 to elect members of East Dorset District Council in Dorset, England. The whole council was up for election after boundary changes and the Conservative party stayed in overall control of the council.

== Election result ==
East Dorset local election result 2003
| Party | Seats | Gains | Losses | Net gain/loss | Seats % | Votes % | Votes | +/− |
|---|---|---|---|---|---|---|---|---|
| Conservative | 24 | | | -2 | 66.7 | 59.9 | 24,753 | |
| Liberal Democrats | 11 | | | +2 | 30.6 | 36.1 | 14,921 | |
| Independent | 1 | | | 0 | 2.8 | 1.1 | 435 | |
| Labour | 0 | | | 0 | 0 | 1.7 | 723 | |
| Dorset Stop The War | 0 | | | 0 | 0 | 0.7 | 310 | |
| UKIP | 0 | | | 0 | 0 | 0.5 | 195 | |

== Ward results ==
Alderholt
| Party | Candidate | Votes | % | ±% |
|---|---|---|---|---|
| Conservative | David Cozier | 530 | 75.8 | |
| Liberal Democrats | Benjamin Haynes | 169 | 24.2 | |
| Majority | | 361 | 51.6 | |
| Turnout | | 699 | 32.2 | |

Ameysford
| Party | Candidate | Votes | % | ±% |
|---|---|---|---|---|
| Conservative | Pauline Reynolds | 500 | 73.6 | |
| Liberal Democrats | David Roberts | 179 | 26.4 | |
| Majority | | 321 | 47.3 | |
| Turnout | | 679 | 32.6 | |

Colehill East (2 seats)
| Party | Candidate | Votes | % | ±% |
|---|---|---|---|---|
| Liberal Democrats | Janet Dover | 799 | | |
| Liberal Democrats | Donald Wallace | 709 | | |
| Conservative | Kevin Johnson | 480 | | |
| Conservative | Peter Finney | 459 | | |
| Independent | John Bell | 132 | | |
| Labour | Kathryn Parish | 92 | | |
| Turnout | | 2,671 | 36.8 | |

Colehill West
| Party | Candidate | Votes | % | ±% |
|---|---|---|---|---|
| Conservative | David Packer | 456 | 58.4 | |
| Liberal Democrats | Elena Pujol | 325 | 41.6 | |
| Majority | | 131 | 16.8 | |
| Turnout | | 781 | 40.5 | |

Corfe Mullen Central (2 seats)
| Party | Candidate | Votes | % | ±% |
|---|---|---|---|---|
| Liberal Democrats | John Holland | 707 | | |
| Liberal Democrats | Byron Kimber | 652 | | |
| Conservative | John Harrington | 442 | | |
| Conservative | Peter Haward | 405 | | |
| Turnout | | 2,206 | 28.8 | |

Corfe Mullen North
| Party | Candidate | Votes | % | ±% |
|---|---|---|---|---|
| Liberal Democrats | Anne Holland | 456 | 71.3 | |
| Conservative | Andrew Russell | 184 | 28.8 | |
| Majority | | 272 | 42.5 | |
| Turnout | | 640 | 32.8 | |

Corfe Mullen South
| Party | Candidate | Votes | % | ±% |
|---|---|---|---|---|
| Liberal Democrats | Stewart Hearn | 441 | 63.3 | |
| Conservative | Michael Soper | 256 | 36.7 | |
| Majority | | 185 | 26.5 | |
| Turnout | | 697 | 35.1 | |

Crane
| Party | Candidate | Votes | % | ±% |
|---|---|---|---|---|
| Conservative | Timothy Palmer | 483 | 74.0 | |
| Liberal Democrats | Dora Aburrow | 170 | 26.0 | |
| Majority | | 313 | 47.9 | |
| Turnout | | 653 | 38.6 | |

Ferndown Central (2 seats)
| Party | Candidate | Votes | % | ±% |
|---|---|---|---|---|
| Conservative | Queenie Comfort | 1,035 | | |
| Conservative | Derek Burt | 999 | | |
| Liberal Democrats | Mary Angus | 337 | | |
| Liberal Democrats | Percival Bartlett | 269 | | |
| Turnout | | 2,640 | 37.5 | |

Ferndown Links (2 seats)
| Party | Candidate | Votes | % | ±% |
|---|---|---|---|---|
| Conservative | Maureen Godfrey | 889 | | |
| Conservative | John Little | 837 | | |
| Liberal Democrats | Roger Angus | 303 | | |
| Liberal Democrats | Philip Harknett | 240 | | |
| Turnout | | 2,269 | 29.5 | |

Handley Vale
| Party | Candidate | Votes | % | ±% |
|---|---|---|---|---|
| Liberal Democrats | Pauline Bailey-Wright | 415 | 57.5 | |
| Conservative | Phyllis Packer | 307 | 42.5 | |
| Majority | | 108 | 15.0 | |
| Turnout | | 722 | 36.5 | |

Holt
| Party | Candidate | Votes | % | ±% |
|---|---|---|---|---|
| Conservative | Spencer Flower | 572 | 74.3 | |
| Liberal Democrats | Heather Gurney | 198 | 25.7 | |
| Majority | | 374 | 48.6 | |
| Turnout | | 770 | 40.7 | |

Longham
| Party | Candidate | Votes | % | ±% |
|---|---|---|---|---|
| Conservative | Gladys Elliot | 365 | 59.0 | |
| Liberal Democrats | Allan White | 254 | 41.0 | |
| Majority | | 111 | 17.9 | |
| Turnout | | 619 | 33.9 | |

Parley (2 seats)
| Party | Candidate | Votes | % | ±% |
|---|---|---|---|---|
| Conservative | Ronald Daw | 909 | | |
| Conservative | Barbara Manuel | 895 | | |
| Liberal Democrats | Helen Reay | 230 | | |
| Liberal Democrats | Stephen Dix | 226 | | |
| Labour | Christopher Hampton | 155 | | |
| Turnout | | 2,415 | 32.4 | |

St Leonards & St Ives East (2 seats)
| Party | Candidate | Votes | % | ±% |
|---|---|---|---|---|
| Conservative | Ann Warman | 1,102 | | |
| Conservative | Michael Dyer | 1,014 | | |
| Liberal Democrats | Deirdre Briggs | 227 | | |
| UKIP | Allan Tallett | 195 | | |
| Liberal Democrats | Lilian Rowe | 183 | | |
| Labour | Duncan Finch | 129 | | |
| Turnout | | 2,850 | 38.4 | |

St Leonards & St Ives West
| Party | Candidate | Votes | % | ±% |
|---|---|---|---|---|
| Conservative | Raymond Dudman | 781 | 81.9 | |
| Liberal Democrats | Dennis Truscott | 173 | 18.1 | |
| Majority | | 608 | 63.7 | |
| Turnout | | 954 | 47.0 | |

Stapehill
| Party | Candidate | Votes | % | ±% |
|---|---|---|---|---|
| Conservative | George Russell | 541 | 80.9 | |
| Liberal Democrats | Mario Rouse | 128 | 19.1 | |
| Majority | | 413 | 61.7 | |
| Turnout | | 669 | 34.6 | |

Stour
| Party | Candidate | Votes | % | ±% |
|---|---|---|---|---|
| Liberal Democrats | Elizabeth Guinn | 334 | 56.6 | |
| Conservative | John Moore | 256 | 43.4 | |
| Majority | | 78 | 13.2 | |
| Turnout | | 590 | 30.5 | |

Three Cross & Potterne
| Party | Candidate | Votes | % | ±% |
|---|---|---|---|---|
| Independent | Victor Redpath | 243 | 57.9 | |
| Liberal Democrats | Carol Bond | 177 | 42.1 | |
| Majority | | 66 | 15.7 | |
| Turnout | | 420 | 22.7 | |

Verwood Dewlands (2 seats)
| Party | Candidate | Votes | % | ±% |
|---|---|---|---|---|
| Conservative | Toni Coombs | 809 | | |
| Conservative | Josephine Staunton-Lambert | 684 | | |
| Liberal Democrats | Peter Baker | 481 | | |
| Liberal Democrats | Adam Reay | 408 | | |
| Turnout | | 2,382 | 34.0 | |

Verwood Newtown
| Party | Candidate | Votes | % | ±% |
|---|---|---|---|---|
| Conservative | Boyden Mortimer | 386 | 53.8 | |
| Liberal Democrats | Lindsey Dedden | 271 | 37.8 | |
| Independent | Derrick Crisp | 60 | 8.4 | |
| Majority | | 115 | 16.0 | |
| Turnout | | 717 | 35.8 | |

Verwood Stephen's Castle (2 seats)
| Party | Candidate | Votes | % | ±% |
|---|---|---|---|---|
| Conservative | Edward Burt | 776 | | |
| Conservative | Lucy Clark | 762 | | |
| Liberal Democrats | Michael Daymond | 617 | | |
| Liberal Democrats | Poppy Baker | 611 | | |
| Turnout | | 2,766 | 40.1 | |

West Moors (3 seats)
| Party | Candidate | Votes | % | ±% |
|---|---|---|---|---|
| Conservative | Alexander Clarke | 1,525 | | |
| Conservative | David Durley | 1,511 | | |
| Conservative | Andrew Skeats | 1,368 | | |
| Liberal Democrats | Jeanne Roberts | 402 | | |
| Liberal Democrats | Alan Dedden | 375 | | |
| Liberal Democrats | Frank Gardiner | 372 | | |
| Labour | Michael Shine | 347 | | |
| Turnout | | 5,901 | 34.0 | |

Wimborne Minster (3 seats)
| Party | Candidate | Votes | % | ±% |
|---|---|---|---|---|
| Liberal Democrats | Patricia Hymers | 1,224 | | |
| Liberal Democrats | David Morgan | 968 | | |
| Liberal Democrats | Marilyn Osner | 891 | | |
| Conservative | Ivy Ellis | 833 | | |
| Conservative | Alan Flint | 775 | | |
| Conservative | Christine Reaks | 627 | | |
| Dorset Stop The War | Damien Stone | 194 | | |
| Dorset Stop The War | Geoffrey Stone | 116 | | |
| Turnout | | 5,628 | 35.8 | |
