= 2003 Guildford Borough Council election =

2003 UK local government election

The 2003 elections for Guildford Borough Council were the first, and as of 2011 the only, full election for Guildford Borough Council conducted by an all postal ballot. The result saw the Conservatives win a majority of seats on Guildford Borough Council for the first time since losing their majority in the 1991 election.

== Boundary changes ==
In September 1998, the Local Government Commission for England published their "Final Recommendations on the Future Electoral Arrangements for Guildford in Surrey". The recommendations in this report formed the basis for the redrawing of ward boundaries in Guildford increasing the number of wards from 21 to 22; and increasing the number of councillors from 45 to 48. The 2003 council election was the first contested under these new ward boundaries.

The new ward boundaries differed from the old ones as follows:

- 13 of the 21 wards in Guildford saw their boundaries alter to some degree or other;
- 8 wards were left unaltered namely - Clandon & Horsley, Effingham, Lovelace, Normandy, Pirbright, Send, Tillingbourne and Worplesdon;
- Merrow & Burpham ward, which previously had elected 3 councillors, was split in two. In its place was created a new Merrow ward with 3 councillors and a new Burpham ward with 2 councillors.
- the three wards representing Ash and Tongham, prior to the 2003 boundary changes, had been named Ash, Ash Vale and Tongham. Between them they had been represented by 6 councillors. They were replaced by three substantially redrawn wards with the names Ash South & Tongham, Ash Vale and Ash Wharf, which between them had 7 councillors. The new Ash Vale ward covered a significantly smaller geographical area than the previous ward known as Ash Vale;
- the boundary line between the Pilgrims ward and the Shalford ward was altered so that the Shalford ward would now include the areas of Artington and Compton which had previously been part of Pilgrims. This change saw the number of councillors representing Shalford increase from 1 to 2 and the number of councillors representing Pilgrims decline from 2 to 1;
- the dividing line between the Stoughton ward and the Westborough ward was redrawn;
- the various dividing lines between the following wards in Guildford town were redrawn: Christchurch, Friary & St Nicolas, Holy Trinity, Onslow, and Stoke; and
- the number of councillors representing Holy Trinity increased from 2 to 3 and the number of councillors representing Stoke decreased from 3 to 2.

== Voter turnout ==
Average voter turnout increased throughout Guildford Borough Council from 36.2%, in 1999, to 53.4%, in 2003.

== Summary of election results ==
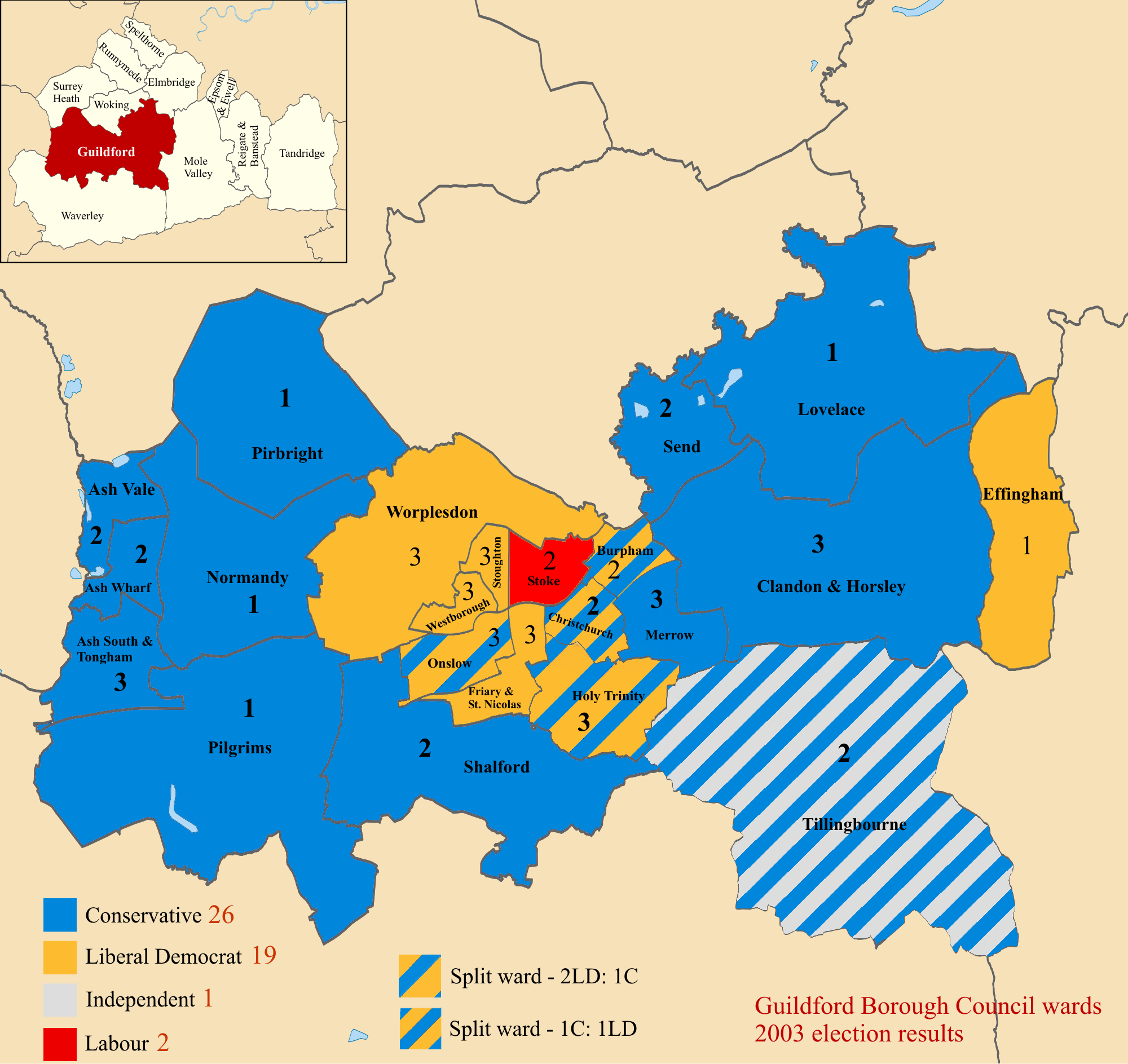
2003 election Guildford Borough Council

Going into the 2003 election the net position was as follows. (The net position includes the defection of one of the Liberal Democrat councillors for Worplesdon first to the independents, in 1999, and then, in 2002, to the Conservatives).

Prior to 2003 council election
Party	Seats
Conservative	18
Labour	6
Liberal Democrats	19
Independent	2

After the election the position was as follows.

After 2003 council election
Party	Seats
Conservative	26
Labour	2
Liberal Democrats	19
Independent	1

- The Conservatives made a net gain of eight seats, gaining nine and losing one;
- The Liberal Democrats retained the same number of seats; gaining four and losing four;
- The Labour Party lost four seats;
- The number of independents on Guildford Borough Council reduced from two to one.

=== Conservative seat changes ===
In the May 2003 elections, the Conservatives gained 6 seats in Guildford town itself (4 in the Merrow and Burpham area, 1 in Holy Trinity Ward and 1 in Onslow ward); 2 seats in the Ash and Tongham area, towards the west of the borough of Guildford; and 1 seat in Tillingbourne, the rural district towards the south east of Guildford borough.

The Liberal Democrats retook from the Conservatives the 1 Worplesdon seat which the Liberal Democrats had lost as a result of a defection during the 1999-2003 session.

=== Liberal Democrat seat changes ===
In May 2003, the Liberal Democrats gained 3 seats from the Labour Party in Westborough ward, towards the west of Guildford town. The Liberal Democrats retook from the Conservatives the Worplesdon seat which the Liberal Democrats had lost as a result of a defection during the 1999-2003 session.

The Liberal Democrats lost 4 seats to the Conservatives three in Guildford town itself (2 losses in the Merrow & Burpham areas and 1 in Onslow ward) and one in the rural Tillingbourne ward.

=== Labour seat changes ===
The Labour Party lost 3 seats to the Liberal Democrats in Westborough. Additionally the Labour Party lost 1 seat in Stoke ward, towards the north of Guildford town as a result of boundary changes and a reduction in the number of councillors representing that ward from 3 to 2.

=== By election changes ===
Subsequent to the May 2003 elections, the Liberal Democrats gained a seat from the Conservatives in Merrow ward, in a by election in July 2003, increasing the number of Liberal Democrat seats on the council from 19 to 20 and reducing the number of Conservative seats from 26 to 25.

== May 2003 Results ==
Ash South & Tongham (top 3 candidates elected)
Party	Candidate	Votes	%	±%
Conservative	John Grenville Ades	1691	56.2	
Conservative	Stuart James Carter	1395	46.4	
Conservative	Nicholas John Sutcliffe	1356	45.1	
Liberal Democrats	Alan Richard Hilliar	1035	34.4	
Liberal Democrats	Susan Gail Elizabeth Spencer	985	32.8	
Liberal Democrats	Carolyn Elisabeth Ruth Hilliar	967	32.2	
Labour	Rosa Katherine Pawsey	276	9.2	
Labour	Donald Bennett Hirsch	262	8.7	
Labour	Alan Duthie Roy	243	8.1	
Majority		321	10.7	
Turnout		3007	49.7	

Ash Vale (top 2 candidates elected)
Party	Candidate	Votes	%	±%
Conservative	Nigel Manning	1085	56.3	
Conservative	Marsha Jayne Moseley	1037	53.8	
Liberal Democrats	Denise Jacqueline Smith	581	30.2	
Liberal Democrats	Craig Victor Pickets	562	29.2	
Labour	Lynne Janice MacDonald	176	9.1	
Labour	Amanda Elizabeth Emily Reed	159	8.3	
Majority		456	23.7	
Turnout		1926	45.5	

Ash Wharf (top 2 candidates elected)
Party	Candidate	Votes	%	±%
Conservative	Jayne Hewlett	1048	47.9	
Conservative	Steven Thomas Evans	1028	47.0	
Liberal Democrats	Christine Valerie Frampton	762	34.8	
Liberal Democrats	Peter Richard Frampton	743	34.0	
Labour	Kevin Eric Jenkinson	269	12.3	
Labour	Kazimierz Mieczyslaw Jasinski	239	10.9	
Majority		266	12.2	
Turnout		2187	48.8	

Burpham (top 2 candidates elected)
Party	Candidate	Votes	%	±%
Liberal Democrats	Edward Patrick Mayne	1015	45.5	
Conservative	Nicholas Dominic Leonard Brougham	966	43.3	
Liberal Democrats	Rupert John Kinnaird Sheard	927	41.6	
Conservative	Julie Jean Perry	916	41.1	
Labour	Adrian Charles Newton	240	10.8	
Labour	Malcolm Piers Hill	196	8.8	
Majority		39	1.7	
Turnout		2230	55.5	

Christchurch (top 2 candidates elected)
Party	Candidate	Votes	%	±%
Conservative	Andrew John Edward Hodges	1312	50.5	
Liberal Democrats	Vivienne Natalie Johnson	1154	44.5	
Conservative	David Hunter	1151	44.3	
Liberal Democrats	Tom Sharp	968	37.3	
Green	John Michael Pletts	180	6.9	
Labour	Celia Anne Lindsay	148	5.7	
Labour	Tim David Wolfenden	118	4.5	
Majority		3	0.1	
Turnout		2596	67.6	

Clandon & Horsley (top 3 candidates elected)
Party	Candidate	Votes	%	±%
Conservative	Jennifer Eleri Powell	2761	72.4	
Conservative	Jenny Mary Wicks	2563	67.3	
Conservative	Andrew John French	2521	66.2	
Liberal Democrats	Ronald James Harman	720	18.9	
Liberal Democrats	Philip John Palmer	597	15.7	
Liberal Democrats	Teresa Thorne	524	13.7	
Labour	Meriel Anne Beynon	389	10.2	
Labour	Julie Roxburgh	377	9.9	
Labour	John Virgo Brown	364	9.6	
Majority		1801	47.3	
Turnout		3811	58.6	

Effingham (only 1 candidate elected)
Party	Candidate	Votes	%	±%
Liberal Democrats	Elizabeth Irene Hogger	700	52.3	
Conservative	James Louie Nicholls	572	42.7	
Labour	Fanny Lines	32	2.4	
Majority		128	9.6	
Turnout		1339	68.8	

Friary & St. Nicolas (top 3 candidates elected)
Party	Candidate	Votes	%	±%
Liberal Democrats	Richard George Marks	1694	57.9	
Liberal Democrats	Robert Evelyn Blundell	1684	57.6	
Liberal Democrats	David John Goodwin	1642	56.2	
Conservative	Michael John Gorman	628	21.5	
Conservative	Elizabeth Ann Hooper	621	21.2	
Conservative	Philip Matthew Simon Hooper	571	19.5	
Labour	Helen Mary Ayscough	325	11.1	
Labour	James Heaphy	292	10.0	
Labour	Alexander Dominic Robin Ayscough	261	8.9	
Trinity	Michel Wayne Harper	225	7.7	
Trinity	Raschid Michael Abdullah	205	7.0	
Majority		1014	34.7	
Turnout		2924	46.6	

Holy Trinity (top 3 candidates elected)
Party	Candidate	Votes	%	±%
Liberal Democrats	Tamsy Katharine Baker	1509	47.7	
Liberal Democrats	Gordon Alfred Bridger	1390	44.0	
Conservative	Sarah Kathleen Creedy	1337	42.3	
Liberal Democrats	Peter Slade	1237	39.1	
Conservative	David Anthony Ellis Williams	1187	37.5	
Conservative	Vivien Mary Sale	1179	37.3	
Green	Barbara Kathleen Edwards	392	12.4	
Labour	Barry Hall	214	6.8	
Labour	Frank Gunning	192	6.1	
Labour	Alexander Hamilton MacDonald	170	5.4	
UKIP	Robert Alexander McWhirter	106	3.4	
Majority		100	3.2	
Turnout		3162	55.8	

Lovelace (only 1 candidate elected)
Party	Candidate	Votes	%	±%
Conservative	John Richard Garrett	629	59.2	
Labour	Carol Hayton	204	19.2	
Liberal Democrats	Charles Arthur Julian Thorne	179	16.9	
Majority		425	40.0	
Turnout		1062	57.5	

Merrow (top 3 candidates elected)
Party	Candidate	Votes	%	±%
Conservative	Anthony William Bays	1580	46.5	
Conservative	Jennifer Jordan	1572	46.2	
Conservative	Sheridan Nicholas Westlake	1569	46.1	
Liberal Democrats	Anne Lee	1434	42.2	
Liberal Democrats	Margaret Rachael Stanley	1419	41.7	
Liberal Democrats	Merilyn Gail Spier	1399	41.1	
Labour	Michael Peter Hornsby-Smith	337	9.9	
Labour	Geoffrey Robert Balls	314	9.2	
Labour	Graham Redvers Gosling	289	8.5	
Majority		135	4.0	
Turnout		3401	58.2	

Normandy (only 1 candidate elected)
Party	Candidate	Votes	%	±%
Conservative	Diana Lockyer-Nibbs	923	61.7	
Liberal Democrats	Richard Henry Vincent Charman	365	24.4	
Labour	Kathleen Brady	172	11.5	
Majority		558	37.3	
Turnout		1497	62.1	

Onslow (top 3 candidates elected)
Party	Candidate	Votes	%	±%
Liberal Democrats	Lynda Strudwick	1115	42.2	
Liberal Democrats	Tony Phillips	1094	41.4	
Conservative	Sheila Ann Kirkland	984	37.3	
Conservative	Adrian Stuart Chandler	960	36.3	
Liberal Democrats	Steven Christopher Freeman	920	34.8	
Conservative	Michael Andrew Chambers	893	33.8	
Labour	Joseph Ian Bullock	541	20.5	
Labour	Florence Flynn	382	14.5	
Labour	Raymond Thomas Rogers	310	11.7	
Green	Richard William Stephens	310	11.7	
Majority		24	0.9	
Turnout		2641	41.6	

Pilgrims (only 1 candidate elected)
Party	Candidate	Votes	%	±%
Conservative	Anthony Rooth	750	67.7	
Liberal Democrats	Philip Scott Mellor	231	20.8	
Labour	Kathleen Parfitt	85	7.7	
Majority		519	46.8	
Turnout		1108	58.4	

Pirbright (only 1 candidate elected)
Party	Candidate	Votes	%	±%
Conservative	Michael George William Nevins	606	63.9	
Liberal Democrats	Rebecca Charlotte Marie Healy	206	21.7	
Labour	Peter Paul Newmark	98	10.3	
Majority		400	42.2	
Turnout		948	50.9	

Send (top 2 candidates elected)
Party	Candidate	Votes	%	±%
Conservative	Keith Charles Taylor	1262	67.6	
Conservative	Terence Dickson Patrick	1049	56.2	
Labour	Sheila Bean	386	20.7	
Liberal Democrats	Madeline Amelia Clements	309	16.5	
Liberal Democrats	Rupert Emerson	285	15.3	
Labour	Sally Carrol Tiffin	186	10.0	
Majority		663	35.5	
Turnout		1868	58.3	

Shalford (top 2 candidates elected)
Party	Candidate	Votes	%	±%
Conservative	Vasilis Alexandros Kapsalis	1348	55.4	
Conservative	Neil Ward	1152	47.4	
Liberal Democrats	David Vyvyan Orchard	863	35.5	
Liberal Democrats	David Thomson	768	31.6	
Labour	Michael Stanley Jeram	266	10.9	
Labour	Susan Pauline Gomm	180	7.4	
Majority		289	11.9	
Turnout		2432	59.4	

Stoke (top 2 candidates elected)
Party	Candidate	Votes	%	±%
Labour	Brian Keith Chesterton	994	43.8	
Labour	Angela Gunning	989	43.6	
Liberal Democrats	Thibault-Charles Jamme	651	28.7	
Liberal Democrats	Stephen John Wright	584	25.7	
Conservative	Michael David Catton	436	19.2	
Conservative	Kenneth Henry Johns	336	14.8	
BNP	Francis Samuel McAllister	187	8.2	
Majority		338	14.9	
Turnout		2268	49.9	

Stoughton (top 3 candidates elected)
Party	Candidate	Votes	%	±%
Liberal Democrats	Pauline Ann Searle	1367	47.4	
Liberal Democrats	Jayne Diana Marks	1352	46.9	
Liberal Democrats	Fiona Jean White	1087	37.7	
Independent	Anthony James Ferris	670	23.2	
Conservative	David James Quelch	657	22.8	
Conservative	Andrew Nicholas Whitby-Collins	548	19.0	
Conservative	Charlotte Helen Louise Keys	428	14.8	
Labour	Carole Jean Barber	333	11.6	
Labour	Ian Stuart Mather	328	11.4	
Labour	William McCulloch Scott	319	11.1	
Trinity	Nigel Herbert Foreman	307	10.6	
Trinity	Michael George Pooley	165	5.7	
Majority		417	14.4	
Turnout		2883	47.3	

Tillingbourne (top 2 candidates elected)
Party	Candidate	Votes	%	±%
Independent	Keith Childs	1559	60.6	
Conservative	David Alan Wright	1435	55.8	
Liberal Democrats	Clive Montgomery Wicks	811	31.5	
Labour	Carolyn Fiddes	238	9.3	
Majority		624	24.3	
Turnout		2572	62.3	

Westborough (top 3 candidates elected)
Party	Candidate	Votes	%	±%
Liberal Democrats	Valerie Jean Hazelwood	1292	41.3	
Liberal Democrats	Olaf Eugen Kolassa	1233	39.4	
Liberal Democrats	Marilyn Merryweather	1192	38.1	
Labour	Michael Joseph Hassell	1075	34.3	
Labour	Martin Phillips	1056	33.7	
Labour	David Vaughan Hide	969	30.9	
Conservative	Mary Johns	576	18.4	
Conservative	Pamela Anne Parke	566	18.1	
Conservative	John Marshall	544	17.4	
Pacifist Party	John Hugh Morris	133	4.2	
Majority		117	3.7	
Turnout		3132	46.9	

Worplesdon (top 3 candidates elected)
Party	Candidate	Votes	%	±%
Liberal Democrats	Jill Margaret Chan	1586	45.7	
Liberal Democrats	Terence Nigel King	1565	45.1	
Liberal Democrats	Victor John Searle	1519	43.8	
Conservative	Alexander Nigel Sutcliffe	1496	43.1	
Conservative	Sheila Gladys Knight	1418	40.9	
Conservative	Christine Margaret Stacy	1402	40.4	
Labour	Kerry Jane James	302	8.7	
Labour	Norma Patricia Hedger	296	8.5	
Labour	Edward John Boys Pawsey	258	7.4	
Majority		23	0.7	
Turnout		3469	54.4	
