= 2003 Salford City Council election =

2003 UK local government election

Elections to Salford Council were held on 1 May 2003. One third of the council was up for election. The Labour Party kept overall control of the council. Overall turnout was 40.7%.

After the election, the composition of the council was:

- Labour 51
- Liberal Democrat 5
- Conservative 3
- Independent 1

== Election result ==
Salford local election result 2003
Party	Seats	Gains	Losses	Net gain/loss	Seats %	Votes %	Votes	+/−
Labour	18	0	0	0	90.0	52.8	33,716	-0.1%
Conservative	1	1	0	+1	5.0	23.4	14,950	+5.6%
Liberal Democrats	1	0	1	-1	5.0	21.0	13,404	-4.5%
Independent	0	0	0	0	0	2.4	1,556	+0.9%
Green	0	0	0	0	0	0.5	290	+0.1%

== Ward results ==
Barton
Party	Candidate	Votes	%	±%
Labour	Neville Clark	1,697	59.3	−6.8
Liberal Democrats	Ian Mathieson	588	20.6	+2.0
Conservative	Leslie Taylor	575	20.1	+4.7
Majority		1,109	38.7	−8.8
Turnout		2,883	38.6	+16.5
Labour hold		Swing		

Blackfriars
Party	Candidate	Votes	%	±%
Labour	Benjamin Wallsworth	1,258	66.2	−7.4
Liberal Democrats	Robert Brettle	374	19.7	+1.4
Conservative	Nicholas Garside	268	14.1	+14.1
Majority		884	46.5	−8.8
Turnout		1,920	33.8	+13.9
Labour hold		Swing		

Broughton
Party	Candidate	Votes	%	±%
Labour	Bernard Murphy	1,425	70.8	+0.1
Liberal Democrats	Susan Carson	589	29.2	+16.2
Majority		836	41.6	−12.8
Turnout		2,033	37.1	+13.1
Labour hold		Swing		

Cadishead
Party	Candidate	Votes	%	±%
Labour	James Hunt	1,723	59.8	+9.6
Conservative	Elizabeth Hill	799	27.7	−4.6
Liberal Democrats	Patricia Gower	361	12.5	+3.8
Majority		924	32.1	+14.2
Turnout		2,895	45.0	+16.3
Labour hold		Swing		

Claremont
Party	Candidate	Votes	%	±%
Liberal Democrats	Norman Owen	1,904	46.9	−9.5
Labour	Peter Wheeler	1,646	40.5	−3.1
Conservative	Jeremiah Horgan	513	12.6	+12.6
Majority		258	6.4	−6.4
Turnout		4,092	43.2	+15.1
Liberal Democrats hold		Swing		

Eccles
Party	Candidate	Votes	%	±%
Labour	Margaret Morris	1,859	49.0	−7.1
Conservative	Michael Edwards	995	26.2	+1.3
Liberal Democrats	Edward Minty	938	24.7	+5.7
Majority		864	22.8	−8.4
Turnout		3,818	42.9	+15.2
Labour hold		Swing		

Irlam
Party	Candidate	Votes	%	±%
Labour	John Jones	1,576	50.8	+1.3
Conservative	William Dixon	739	23.8	−8.2
Independent	Nicholas Wood	428	13.8	+4.0
Liberal Democrats	Christine Lomax	357	11.5	+2.7
Majority		837	27.0	+9.5
Turnout		3,114	42.8	+17.4
Labour hold		Swing		

Kersal
Party	Candidate	Votes	%	±%
Labour	George Wilson	1,552	49.7	−23.5
Liberal Democrats	Eric Sievers	978	31.3	+4.5
Conservative	Sydney Cooper	595	19.0	+19.0
Majority		574	18.4	−18.0
Turnout		3,156	37.1	+11.8
Labour hold		Swing		

Langworthy
Party	Candidate	Votes	%	±%
Labour	Andrew Leaston	1,078	63.1	+14.7
Liberal Democrats	Stephen Cooke	631	36.9	+14.1
Majority		447	26.2	+3.5
Turnout		1,723	34.0	+12.9
Labour hold		Swing		

Little Hulton
Party	Candidate	Votes	%	±%
Labour	Eric Burgoyne	1,777	67.1	+0.9
Liberal Democrats	David Cowpe	467	17.6	+0.4
Conservative	John Mosley	406	15.3	−1.3
Majority		1,310	49.5	+0.5
Turnout		2,675	38.7	+19.6
Labour hold		Swing		

Ordsall
Party	Candidate	Votes	%	±%
Labour	Charles McIntyre	1,036	59.4	−0.6
Liberal Democrats	Ann Gibbons	539	30.9	+1.2
Conservative	Gary Green	168	9.6	+9.6
Majority		497	28.5	−1.8
Turnout		1,759	36.2	+18.8
Labour hold		Swing		

Pendlebury
Party	Candidate	Votes	%	±%
Labour	Bernard Lea	2,691	69.0	+5.7
Conservative	Marjorie Weston	1,211	31.0	+12.2
Majority		1,480	38.0	−6.5
Turnout		3,943	38.9	+14.5
Labour hold		Swing		

Pendleton
Party	Candidate	Votes	%	±%
Labour	John Warmisham	1,373	63.6	−5.0
Liberal Democrats	Lynn Drake	498	23.1	−2.0
Conservative	Anthony Healey	287	13.3	+13.3
Majority		875	51.2	+6.7
Turnout		2,183	33.8	+13.5
Labour hold		Swing		

Swinton North
Party	Candidate	Votes	%	±%
Labour	James Dawson	2,401	66.9	+8.4
Conservative	Neil Levay	1,190	33.1	+13.1
Majority		1,211	33.8	−3.2
Turnout		3,629	40.7	+15.8
Labour hold		Swing		

Swinton South
Party	Candidate	Votes	%	±%
Labour	Douglas Daniels	2,253	55.2	+9.9
Conservative	Peter Allcock	1,832	44.8	+10.8
Majority		421	10.4	−0.9
Turnout		4,128	42.7	+15.2
Labour hold		Swing		

Walkden North
Party	Candidate	Votes	%	±%
Labour	Vincent Devine	2,164	67.2	−3.4
Conservative	Walter Edwards	590	18.3	+3.6
Liberal Democrats	Deborah Rushton	468	14.5	−0.2
Majority		1,574	48.9	−7.0
Turnout		3,254	40.7	+18.8
Labour hold		Swing		

Walkden South
Party	Candidate	Votes	%	±%
Labour	Norbert Potter	1,790	35.2	−10.0
Conservative	Declan Harrington	1,301	25.6	−6.8
Liberal Democrats	Pauline Ogden	1,076	21.2	−1.0
Independent	David Bowers	912	18.0	+18.0
Majority		489	9.6	−3.2
Turnout		5,110	42.7	+18.1
Labour hold		Swing		

Weaste & Seedley
Party	Candidate	Votes	%	±%
Labour	Alan Clague	1,381	45.5	−0.9
Liberal Democrats	Rick Powell	1,020	33.6	−10.3
Conservative	Robin Garrido	421	13.9	+13.9
Independent	Alan Booth	216	7.1	+7.1
Majority		361	11.9	+9.4
Turnout		3,060	42.3	+13.5
Labour hold		Swing		

Winton
Party	Candidate	Votes	%	±%
Labour	David Lancaster	1,867	53.9	−4.6
Liberal Democrats	Sara Bradbury	855	24.7	+2.2
Conservative	Judith Tope	742	21.4	+2.5
Majority		1,012	29.2	−6.8
Turnout		3,494	39.7	+17.1
Labour hold		Swing		

Worsley & Boothstown
Party	Candidate	Votes	%	±%
Conservative	Beryl Howard	2,318	41.9	+5.5
Liberal Democrats	Gary Riding	1,761	31.8	−12.4
Labour	Warren Coates	1,169	21.1	+5.2
Green	Ian Davies	290	5.2	+1.7
Majority		557	10.1	+2.3
Turnout		5,560	50.0	+14.1
Conservative gain from Liberal Democrats		Swing		
