= 2003 Crawley Borough Council election =

2003 UK local government election

The 2003 Crawley Borough Council election took place on 1 May 2003 to elect members of Crawley Borough Council in West Sussex, England. One third of the council was up for election and the Labour Party stayed in overall control of the council.

After the election, the composition of the council was:

- Labour 22
- Conservative 8
- Liberal Democrats 2

== Election result ==
Overall turnout at the election was 23.16%.

Crawley local election result 2003
| Party | Seats | Gains | Losses | Net gain/loss | Seats % | Votes % | Votes | +/− |
|---|---|---|---|---|---|---|---|---|
| Labour | 7 | 1 | 1 | 0 | 58.3 | 37.2 | 5,863 | -11.0% |
| Conservative | 4 | 1 | 0 | +1 | 33.3 | 34.4 | 5,430 | +3.2% |
| Liberal Democrats | 1 | 0 | 0 | 0 | 8.3 | 22.1 | 3,483 | +4.7% |
| BNP | 0 | 0 | 0 | 0 | 0 | 2.6 | 404 | +2.6% |
| Green | 0 | 0 | 0 | 0 | 0 | 1.8 | 276 | +1.8% |
| Independent | 0 | 0 | 1 | -1 | 0 | 1.5 | 235 | +0.0% |
| Socialist Labour | 0 | 0 | 0 | 0 | 0 | 0.5 | 76 | -0.3% |

== Ward results ==
Broadfield
| Party | Candidate | Votes | % | ±% |
|---|---|---|---|---|
| Labour | James McGough | 569 | 51.1 | −7.3 |
| Conservative | David Bowen | 335 | 30.1 | +2.9 |
| Liberal Democrats | Clare Jeffers | 209 | 18.8 | +7.9 |
| Majority | | 234 | 21.0 | −10.2 |
| Turnout | | 1,113 | 13.0 | −16.5 |
| Labour hold | | Swing | | |

Furnace Green
| Party | Candidate | Votes | % | ±% |
|---|---|---|---|---|
| Conservative | Duncan Crow | 1,130 | 38.8 | −8.6 |
| Labour | Raymond Calcott | 741 | 25.5 | −7.9 |
| Liberal Democrats | David Barry | 636 | 21.8 | +2.5 |
| BNP | Vernon Atkinson | 404 | 13.9 | +13.9 |
| Majority | | 389 | 13.4 | −0.6 |
| Turnout | | 2,911 | 27.2 | +2.0 |
| Conservative hold | | Swing | | |

Gossops Green
| Party | Candidate | Votes | % | ±% |
|---|---|---|---|---|
| Labour | William Ward | 430 | 46.6 | |
| Conservative | Lee Burke | 317 | 34.3 | |
| Liberal Democrats | Howard Llewelyn | 176 | 19.1 | |
| Majority | | 113 | 12.3 | |
| Turnout | | 923 | 23.7 | −3.2 |
| Labour hold | | Swing | | |

Ifield
| Party | Candidate | Votes | % | ±% |
|---|---|---|---|---|
| Labour | John Stanley | 536 | 40.4 | −9.1 |
| Conservative | Brian Blake | 342 | 25.8 | +4.8 |
| Independent | Richard Symonds | 235 | 17.7 | +6.8 |
| Liberal Democrats | Barry Hamilton | 213 | 16.1 | −2.5 |
| Majority | | 194 | 14.6 | −14.0 |
| Turnout | | 1,326 | 20.5 | −19.8 |
| Labour gain from Independent | | Swing | | |

Langley Green (2)
| Party | Candidate | Votes | % | ±% |
|---|---|---|---|---|
| Labour | James Smith | 666 | | |
| Labour | David Shreeves | 619 | | |
| Liberal Democrats | Kevin Osborne | 254 | | |
| Conservative | Keith Brockwell | 253 | | |
| Conservative | Christina Belben | 248 | | |
| Liberal Democrats | Mohammed Rana | 221 | | |
| Turnout | | 2,261 | 22.8 | −1.1 |
| Labour hold | | Swing | | |
| Labour hold | | Swing | | |

Northgate
| Party | Candidate | Votes | % | ±% |
|---|---|---|---|---|
| Liberal Democrats | Gordon Seekings | 610 | 65.0 | +1.8 |
| Labour | Nicholas Webber | 225 | 24.0 | −3.5 |
| Conservative | Corinne Bowen | 104 | 11.1 | +1.8 |
| Majority | | 385 | 41.0 | +5.3 |
| Turnout | | 939 | 26.7 | −4.4 |
| Liberal Democrats hold | | Swing | | |

Pound Hill North
| Party | Candidate | Votes | % | ±% |
|---|---|---|---|---|
| Conservative | Sarah Blake | 831 | 60.9 | |
| Labour | John Stephens | 303 | 22.2 | |
| Liberal Democrats | Nigel Aldridge | 230 | 16.9 | |
| Majority | | 528 | 38.7 | |
| Turnout | | 1,364 | 27.3 | −3.6 |
| Conservative hold | | Swing | | |

Pound Hill South
| Party | Candidate | Votes | % | ±% |
|---|---|---|---|---|
| Conservative | Robert Lanzer | 847 | 57.1 | |
| Labour | Alison Cornell | 383 | 25.8 | |
| Liberal Democrats | Edward Reay | 253 | 17.1 | |
| Majority | | 464 | 31.3 | |
| Turnout | | 1,483 | 27.7 | |
| Conservative hold | | Swing | | |

Southgate
| Party | Candidate | Votes | % | ±% |
|---|---|---|---|---|
| Conservative | Lisa Noel | 404 | 31.4 | −1.0 |
| Labour | Mohammed Qamaruddin | 401 | 31.1 | −19.5 |
| Green | Malcolm Liles | 276 | 21.4 | +21.4 |
| Liberal Democrats | Roger McMurray | 207 | 16.1 | −1.0 |
| Majority | | 3 | 0.3 | |
| Turnout | | 1,288 | 21.3 | −18.4 |
| Conservative gain from Labour | | Swing | | |

Three Bridges
| Party | Candidate | Votes | % | ±% |
|---|---|---|---|---|
| Labour | Dennis Malt | 468 | 42.2 | |
| Conservative | John Rolf | 372 | 33.6 | |
| Liberal Democrats | Victoria Seekings | 268 | 24.2 | |
| Majority | | 96 | 8.6 | |
| Turnout | | 1,108 | 26.8 | |
| Labour hold | | Swing | | |

Tilgate
| Party | Candidate | Votes | % | ±% |
|---|---|---|---|---|
| Labour | Douglas Mayne | 522 | 49.7 | −9.5 |
| Conservative | Alexander Maple | 247 | 23.5 | +3.3 |
| Liberal Democrats | Darren Wise | 206 | 19.6 | +4.4 |
| Socialist Labour | Derek Isaacs | 76 | 7.2 | +1.9 |
| Majority | | 275 | 26.2 | −12.8 |
| Turnout | | 1,051 | 23.2 | −3.8 |
| Labour hold | | Swing | | |
