= 2003 Stroud District Council election =

2003 UK local government election

Results of the 2003 Stroud District Council election

The 2003 Stroud Council election took place on 1 May 2003 to elect members of Stroud District Council in Gloucestershire, England. One third of the council was up for election and the Conservative Party stayed in overall control of the council.

After the election, the composition of the council was

- Conservative 28
- Labour 10
- Liberal Democrat 6
- Green 4
- Independent 3

== Election result ==
Stroud local election result 2003
Party	Seats	Gains	Losses	Net gain/loss	Seats %	Votes %	Votes	+/−
Conservative	5	0	2	-2	29.4	35.6	7,268	-5.9%
Labour	4	0	1	-1	23.5	24.6	5,023	-4.3%
Green	4	0	0	0	23.5	15.4	3,141	+5.0%
Liberal Democrats	2	2	0	+2	11.8	20.3	4,144	+4.0%
Independent	2	1	0	+1	11.8	3.1	624	+0.7%
UKIP	0	0	0	0	0	1.0	211	+0.4%

== Ward results ==
Cainscross
Party	Candidate	Votes	%	±%
Labour	Anthony Shortt	760	48.5	+8.7
Conservative	Norma Rodman	355	22.7	+1.4
Liberal Democrats	Darren Jones	341	21.8	+1.0
Green	Carol Kambites	111	7.1	−0.3
Majority		405	25.8	
Turnout		1,567	30.4	−5.0
Labour hold		Swing		

Cam East
Party	Candidate	Votes	%	±%
Labour	Miranda Clifton	524	40.4	+2.2
Conservative	Julian D'arcy	493	38.0	+1.0
Liberal Democrats	Keith Pearce	281	21.6	−2.6
Majority		31	2.4	
Turnout		1,298	39.7	−1.5
Labour hold		Swing		

Cam West
Party	Candidate	Votes	%	±%
Labour	John Fowles	496	41.8	+3.4
Liberal Democrats	John Dapling	470	39.6	+4.0
Conservative	Lawrence Hall	220	18.5	−0.7
Majority		26	2.2	
Turnout		1,186	35.9	−2.5
Labour hold		Swing		

Central
Party	Candidate	Votes	%	±%
Conservative	Michael Williams	255	46.5	−5.8
Green	Kevin Cranston	126	23.0	+3.7
Labour	Anne Snelgrove	101	18.4	−10.0
Liberal Democrats	Deborah Sutherland	66	12.0	+12.0
Majority		129	23.5	−0.4
Turnout		548	39.0	+1.3
Conservative hold		Swing		

Chalford
Party	Candidate	Votes	%	±%
Conservative	Elizabeth Peters	875	46.5	+7.3
Labour	David Taylor	316	16.8	−10.7
Green	David Wood	306	16.3	−4.7
Liberal Democrats	Barbara Brown	277	14.7	−11.0
UKIP	Leslie Banstead	107	5.7	−4.4
Majority		559	29.7	
Turnout		1,881	37.7	−0.7
Conservative hold		Swing		

Dursley
Party	Candidate	Votes	%	±%
Liberal Democrats	Brian Marsh	727	42.5	+10.0
Conservative	Loraine Patrick	582	34.0	−0.1
Labour	Daryl Matthews	364	21.3	−9.8
UKIP	Anthony Gardiner	37	2.2	+2.2
Majority		145	8.5	
Turnout		1,710	36.4	−2.1
Liberal Democrats gain from Conservative		Swing		

Farmhill and Paganhill
Party	Candidate	Votes	%	±%
Independent	Sheffie Mohammed	361	61.8	+6.2
Labour	Lesley Williams	101	17.3	+1.7
Conservative	Catherine James	77	13.2	−0.9
Liberal Democrats	Mark Rogers	45	7.7	−2.8
Majority		260	44.5	+4.5
Turnout		584	33.9	+3.7
Independent hold		Swing		

Minchinhampton
Party	Candidate	Votes	%	±%
Conservative	Elisabeth Bird	889	59.6	−0.7
Labour	Audrey Smith	330	22.1	−2.5
Liberal Democrats	Margaret Edmunds	224	15.0	+15.0
UKIP	Adrian Blake	48	3.2	−4.6
Majority		559	37.5	
Turnout		1,491	43.8	+7.4
Conservative hold		Swing		

Nailsworth
Party	Candidate	Votes	%	±%
Conservative	John Jeffreys	643	33.1	+0.1
Green	John Nicholson	621	32.0	+3.8
Labour	Keith Norbury	417	21.5	−7.7
Liberal Democrats	Myles Robinson	259	13.4	−0.9
Majority		22	1.1	
Turnout		1,940	39.7	−1.8
Conservative hold		Swing		

Rodborough
Party	Candidate	Votes	%	±%
Conservative	Nigel Cooper	521	39.2	+1.6
Green	Steven Penny	423	31.9	+17.4
Labour	Martin Alder	295	22.2	−11.4
Liberal Democrats	John Howe	89	6.7	−7.4
Majority		98	7.4	
Turnout		1,328	37.9	
Conservative hold		Swing		

Slade
Party	Candidate	Votes	%	±%
Green	Gwendoline Belcher	252	48.3	+5.6
Conservative	Deborah Westgate	148	28.4	+2.7
Labour	Henrietta Nichols	122	23.4	−8.2
Majority		104	19.9	+8.9
Turnout		522	31.1	−2.0
Green hold		Swing		

Stonehouse
Party	Candidate	Votes	%	±%
Labour	Christopher Brine	761	47.0	−8.3
Conservative	Philip Brine	566	34.9	+3.4
Liberal Democrats	Milner Woodhead	154	9.5	+9.5
Green	Sally Pickering	139	8.6	−2.7
Majority		195	12.0	
Turnout		1,620	28.5	−3.4
Labour hold		Swing		

Thrupp
Party	Candidate	Votes	%	±%
Green	Martin Whiteside	436	50.4	+10.7
Conservative	Patricia Carpenter	270	31.2	−3.7
Labour	John Howgate	103	11.9	−13.5
Liberal Democrats	Colleen Rothwell	56	6.5	+6.5
Majority		166	19.2	+14.4
Turnout		865	47.9	+0.1
Green hold		Swing		

Trinity
Party	Candidate	Votes	%	±%
Green	John Marjoram	387	53.5	−15.5
Conservative	Kenneth Brown	169	23.3	+23.3
Labour	Marta Cock	114	15.7	−9.3
Liberal Democrats	Christine Beckingham	54	7.5	+1.5
Majority		218	30.1	−13.9
Turnout		724	44.7	−2.0
Green hold		Swing		

Uplands
Party	Candidate	Votes	%	±%
Independent	Linda Townley	263	40.8	+4.7
Conservative	Linda Jeffreys	167	25.9	−1.8
Labour	Karin Degenberg	106	16.4	−19.7
Liberal Democrats	Ian Owen	46	7.1	+7.1
Green	Henry Leveson-Gower	44	6.8	−4.2
UKIP	Alan Lomas	19	2.9	+2.9
Majority		96	14.9	
Turnout		645	36.7	+3.6
Independent gain from Labour		Swing		

Valley
Party	Candidate	Votes	%	±%
Green	Tobias Green	296	48.4	+10.9
Conservative	Brian Wheatley	145	23.7	+4.4
Labour	John Appleton	113	18.5	−8.8
Liberal Democrats	Michael Stayte	57	9.3	−6.6
Majority		151	24.7	+14.5
Turnout		611	35.9	+1.0
Green hold		Swing		

Wotton-under-Edge
Party	Candidate	Votes	%	±%
Liberal Democrats	Paul Smith	998	52.8	+12.7
Conservative	Sidney Gowers	893	47.2	−6.4
Majority		105	5.6	
Turnout		1,891	37.8	+0.2
Liberal Democrats gain from Conservative		Swing		
