= 2003 Wolverhampton City Council election =

2003 UK local government election

The Council elections held in Wolverhampton in 2003 were one third, and 20 of the 60 seats were up for election.

Average turnout for the City was 29.36%

Wednesfield South ward was notable in that the majority was only 2 votes, representing a majority of only 0.07% over the second placed candidate.

== Ward results ==
Bilston East
Party	Candidate	Votes	%	±%
Labour	Thomas Turner	1068	61.24	
Conservative	Sarah Wynne	414	23.74	
Liberal Democrats	Michael Birch	255	14.62	
Majority		654	37.50	
Turnout		1,744	20.90	

Bilston North
Party	Candidate	Votes	%	±%
Labour	Philip Page	1171	48.41	
Conservative	Christopher Haynes	922	38.11	
Liberal Democrats	Frances Heap	307	12.69	
Majority		249	10.29	
Turnout		2,419	23.28	

Blakenhall
Party	Candidate	Votes	%	±%
Labour	Judith Rowley	1943	72.31	
Conservative	John Corns	453	16.86	
Liberal Democrats	Susan Butler	256	9.53	
Majority		1490	55.45	
Turnout		2,687	30.55	

Bushbury
Party	Candidate	Votes	%	±%
Labour	Paula Brookfield	1067	45.29	
Conservative	Christine Riddle	1001	42.49	
Liberal Democrats	John Steatham	279	11.81	
Majority		66	2.80	
Turnout		2,347	27.21	

East Park
Party	Candidate	Votes	%	±%
Labour	Francis Docherty	1099	62.66	
Conservative	Robert Green	407	23.20	
Liberal Democrats	Ann Whitehouse	240	13.68	
Majority		692	39.45	
Turnout		1,754	23.36	

Ettingshall
Party	Candidate	Votes	%	±%
Labour	Alan Smith	1230	67.29	
Conservative	Peter Dobb	321	17.56	
Liberal Democrats	Eileen Birch	270	14.77	
Majority		909	49.73	
Turnout		1,828	21.63	

Fallings Park
Party	Candidate	Votes	%	±%
Labour	Geoffrey Foster	1316	50.73	
Conservative	Jonathan Evans	973	37.51	
Liberal Democrats	Robin Lawrence	304	11.72	
Majority		343	13.22	
Turnout		2,594	31.89	

Graiseley
Party	Candidate	Votes	%	±%
Labour	Man Mohan Passi	1741	45.41	
Conservative	John Mellor	1624	42.36	
Liberal Democrats	Mary Millar	306	7.98	
Green	David Hawkins	145	3.78	
Majority		117	3.05	
Turnout		3,834	42.40	

Heath Town
Party	Candidate	Votes	%	±%
Labour	Milkinderpal Jaspal	827	48.59	
Liberal	Colin Hallmark	531	31.20	
Conservative	Morriss Berry	331	19.45	
Majority		296	17.39	
Turnout		1,702	21.25	

Low Hill
Party	Candidate	Votes	%	±%
Labour	Peter O'Neill	946	67.96	
Conservative	Peter Knight	438	31.47	
Majority		508	36.49	
Turnout		1,392	16.50	

Merry Hill
Party	Candidate	Votes	%	±%
Conservative	David Nicholls	1868	60.85	
Labour	Manohar Minhas	774	25.21	
Liberal Democrats	Jessica Pringle	415	13.52	
Majority		1094	35.64	
Turnout		3,070	32.52	

Oxley
Party	Candidate	Votes	%	±%
Labour	Ian Brookfield	1304	46.72	
Conservative	Brian Bromley	1012	36.26	
Liberal Democrats	Ian Jenkins	464	16.62	
Majority		292	10.46	
Turnout		2,791	29.46	

Park
Party	Candidate	Votes	%	±%
Conservative	Geoffrey Patten	1662	44.40	
Labour	Sandra Samuels	1303	34.81	
Liberal Democrats	Bryan Lewis	476	12.72	
Majority		359	9.59	
Turnout		3,743	36.75	

Penn
Party	Candidate	Votes	%	±%
Conservative	Paddy Bradley	2127	58.32	
Labour	David Hampton	1071	29.37	
Liberal Democrats	June Hemsley	428	11.74	
Majority		1056	28.96	
Turnout		3,647	36.76	

St Peter's
Party	Candidate	Votes	%	±%
Labour	Roger Lawrence	1438	56.24	
Liberal Democrats	David Jack	652	25.50	
Conservative	Harjinder Sangha	311	12.16	
Green	Paul Armstrong	143	5.59	
Majority		786	30.74	
Turnout		2,557	25.47	

Spring Vale
Party	Candidate	Votes	%	±%
Liberal Democrats	Michael Heap	2094	61.53	
Labour	John Bruton	1011	29.71	
Conservative	Brian Fellows	287	8.43	
Majority		786	30.74	
Turnout		2,557	25.47	

Tettenhall Regis
Party	Candidate	Votes	%	±%
Conservative	John Davis	1746	67.62	
Liberal Democrats	Roger Gray	472	18.28	
Labour	Maqsood Ahmed	355	13.75	
Majority		1274	49.34	
Turnout		2,582	28.29	

Tettenhall Wightwick
Party	Candidate	Votes	%	±%
Conservative	Joan Stevenson	2426	72.05	
Labour	William Reynolds	575	17.07	
Liberal Democrats	Philip Bennett	349	10.37	
Majority		1851	54.97	
Turnout		3,367	37.46	

Wednesfield North
Party	Candidate	Votes	%	±%
Conservative	David Bourne	1217	44.24	
Labour	Gwendoline Stafford Good	1208	43.91	
Liberal Democrats	Stephen Birch	323	11.74	
Majority		9	0.33	
Turnout		2,751	31.60	

Wednesfield South
Party	Candidate	Votes	%	±%
Conservative	Fiona Latter	1216	44.53	
Labour	Paul Kalinauckas	1214	44.45	
Liberal Democrats	Carole Jenkins	292	10.69	
Majority		2	0.07	
Turnout		2,731	31.14	
