= 2003 Purbeck District Council election =

2003 UK local government election

Results of the 2003 Purbeck District Council election

Elections to Purbeck District Council were held on 1 May 2003. One third of the council was up for election and the Conservative Party stayed in overall control of the council.

After the election, the composition of the council was

- Conservative 13
- Liberal Democrat 8
- Independent 3

== Election result ==
Purbeck local election result 2003
Party	Seats	Gains	Losses	Net gain/loss	Seats %	Votes %	Votes	+/−
Liberal Democrats	5			+3	62.5	36.4	3,780	+0.5%
Conservative	3			-3	37.5	44.3	4,603	+13.8%
Labour	0			0	0	12.8	1,334	+0.3%
Independent	0			0	0	6.4	667	-14.8%

== Ward results ==
Castle
Party	Candidate	Votes	%	±%
Liberal Democrats	Philip Duffy	554	59.5	
Conservative	Stephen Drury	352	37.8	
Labour	Ruth Cade	25	2.7	
Majority		202	21.7	
Turnout		931		

Lytchett Minster and Upton East
Party	Candidate	Votes	%	±%
Liberal Democrats	Frederick Drane	610	61.5	
Conservative	Pam Hindley	382	38.5	
Majority		228	23.0	
Turnout		992		

Lytchett Minster and Upton West
Party	Candidate	Votes	%	±%
Liberal Democrats	Andrew Starr	498	45.6	
Conservative	Bill Pipe	480	44.0	
Labour	David Collis	114	10.4	
Majority		18	1.6	
Turnout		1,092		

St Martin
Party	Candidate	Votes	%	±%
Liberal Democrats	Keith Green	497	54.3	
Conservative	Malcolm Russell	287	31.3	
Labour	James Bennett	132	14.4	
Majority		210	23.0	
Turnout		916		

Swanage North
Party	Candidate	Votes	%	±%
Conservative	William Trite	908	60.7	
Liberal Democrats	Harry Carter	409	27.4	
Labour	Leigh van de Zande	178	11.9	
Majority		499	33.3	
Turnout		1,495		

Swanage South
Party	Candidate	Votes	%	±%
Conservative	Julie Wheeldon	920	50.3	+7.8
Liberal Democrats	John Wootton	497	27.2	+3.2
Labour	Christine Rabson	413	22.6	−10.9
Majority		423	23.1	+14.1
Turnout		1,830		

Wareham
Party	Candidate	Votes	%	±%
Liberal Democrats	Eric Osmond	715	33.6	−8.9
Independent	Leslie Burns	667	31.4	+1.9
Conservative	Roy Anderson	572	26.9	+3.9
Labour	Bob Huskinson	171	8.0	+3.0
Majority		48	2.2	−10.8
Turnout		2,125		

Wool
Party	Candidate	Votes	%	±%
Conservative	Rosemary Hodder	702	70.0	
Labour	Jon Davey	301	30.0	
Majority		401	40.0	
Turnout		1,003		
