= 2003 Maidstone Borough Council election =

2003 UK local government election

Results of the 2003 Maidstone District Council election

The 2003 Maidstone Borough Council election took place on 1 May 2003 to elect members of Maidstone Borough Council in Kent, England. One third of the council was up for election and the council stayed under no overall control.

After the election, the composition of the council was:

- Liberal Democrat 21
- Conservative 21
- Labour 10
- Independent 3

== Background ==
Before the election no party had a majority on the council with the Liberal Democrats on 21 seats, the Conservatives 19, Labour 12 and 3 independents. The Conservatives stood in all 18 seats which were being contested, the Liberal Democrat and Labour parties each put up 17 candidates, the United Kingdom Independence Party 10 and there were 2 independent candidates.

== Election result ==
Overall turnout in the election was 30.8%.

Maidstone local election result 2003
| Party | Seats | Gains | Losses | Net gain/loss | Seats % | Votes % | Votes | +/− |
|---|---|---|---|---|---|---|---|---|
| Conservative | 9 | 2 | 0 | +2 | 50.0 | 42.2 | 10,894 | +3.6% |
| Liberal Democrats | 7 | 1 | 1 | 0 | 38.9 | 34.3 | 8,872 | -2.6% |
| Labour | 1 | 0 | 2 | -2 | 5.6 | 16.3 | 4,210 | +0.7% |
| Independent | 1 | 0 | 0 | 0 | 5.6 | 4.3 | 1,110 | -0.8% |
| UKIP | 0 | 0 | 0 | 0 | 0 | 2.9 | 748 | +1.7% |

== Ward results ==
Allington
| Party | Candidate | Votes | % | ±% |
|---|---|---|---|---|
| Liberal Democrats | Cynthia Robertson | 1,169 | 61.5 | |
| Conservative | Sally Nicholson | 459 | 24.1 | |
| Labour | Marianna Polisczuk | 197 | 10.4 | |
| UKIP | Gareth Kendall | 77 | 4.0 | |
| Majority | | 710 | 37.4 | |
| Turnout | | 1,902 | 33.5 | −4.1 |
| Liberal Democrats hold | | Swing | | |

Bearsted
| Party | Candidate | Votes | % | ±% |
|---|---|---|---|---|
| Conservative | Allan Bradshaw | 1,312 | 62.2 | |
| Liberal Democrats | Sheila Chittenden | 363 | 17.2 | |
| Labour | Jeanne Gibson | 332 | 15.7 | |
| UKIP | Peter Croughton | 103 | 4.9 | |
| Majority | | 949 | 45.0 | |
| Turnout | | 2,110 | 32.5 | −7.4 |
| Conservative hold | | Swing | | |

Boxley
| Party | Candidate | Votes | % | ±% |
|---|---|---|---|---|
| Conservative | Malcolm Greer | 763 | 46.1 | |
| Liberal Democrats | Ian Chittenden | 643 | 38.9 | |
| Labour | Stephen Gibson | 172 | 10.4 | |
| UKIP | Margaret Leggat | 77 | 4.7 | |
| Majority | | 120 | 7.2 | |
| Turnout | | 1,655 | 25.7 | +0.3 |
| Conservative hold | | Swing | | |

Coxheath and Hunton
| Party | Candidate | Votes | % | ±% |
|---|---|---|---|---|
| Liberal Democrats | John Williams | 943 | 48.7 | |
| Conservative | Adrian Brindle | 794 | 41.0 | |
| Labour | John Hughes | 198 | 10.2 | |
| Majority | | 149 | 7.7 | |
| Turnout | | 1,935 | 35.6 | +0.4 |
| Liberal Democrats hold | | Swing | | |

Detling and Thurnham
| Party | Candidate | Votes | % | ±% |
|---|---|---|---|---|
| Conservative | John Horne | 485 | 72.6 | +9.5 |
| Liberal Democrats | John Watson | 123 | 18.4 | −6.2 |
| Labour | Raymond Huson | 60 | 9.0 | −3.4 |
| Majority | | 362 | 54.2 | +15.7 |
| Turnout | | 668 | 29.7 | +0.7 |
| Conservative hold | | Swing | | |

Downswood and Otham
| Party | Candidate | Votes | % | ±% |
|---|---|---|---|---|
| Independent | Frederick Winckless | 470 | 76.3 | −2.5 |
| Conservative | Paul Butcher | 115 | 18.7 | −2.5 |
| Labour | Richard Coates | 31 | 5.0 | +5.0 |
| Majority | | 355 | 57.6 | 0.0 |
| Turnout | | 616 | 29.0 | +2.0 |
| Independent hold | | Swing | | |

East
| Party | Candidate | Votes | % | ±% |
|---|---|---|---|---|
| Liberal Democrats | David Naghi | 1,074 | 54.2 | |
| Conservative | Alan Warner | 623 | 31.5 | |
| Labour | Brian Wood | 216 | 10.9 | |
| UKIP | Anthony Robertson | 67 | 3.4 | |
| Majority | | 451 | 22.7 | |
| Turnout | | 1,980 | 31.8 | −2.3 |
| Liberal Democrats hold | | Swing | | |

Fant
| Party | Candidate | Votes | % | ±% |
|---|---|---|---|---|
| Liberal Democrats | Patrick Schnell | 724 | 43.6 | |
| Labour | John Morrison | 593 | 35.7 | |
| Conservative | Joanne Frith | 274 | 16.5 | |
| UKIP | Stephen Dean | 68 | 4.1 | |
| Majority | | 131 | 7.9 | |
| Turnout | | 1,659 | 29.0 | +0.9 |
| Liberal Democrats gain from Labour | | Swing | | |

Harrietsham and Lenham
| Party | Candidate | Votes | % | ±% |
|---|---|---|---|---|
| Labour | Janetta Sams | 709 | 44.6 | |
| Conservative | David Marshall | 674 | 42.4 | |
| Liberal Democrats | Stephen Morris | 205 | 12.9 | |
| Majority | | 35 | 2.2 | |
| Turnout | | 1,588 | 39.8 | −1.9 |
| Labour hold | | Swing | | |

High Street
| Party | Candidate | Votes | % | ±% |
|---|---|---|---|---|
| Liberal Democrats | Fran Wilson | 616 | 47.8 | |
| Conservative | Scott Hahnefeld | 317 | 24.6 | |
| Labour | Leonard Burfield | 252 | 19.6 | |
| UKIP | Terence Kendall | 103 | 8.0 | |
| Majority | | 299 | 23.2 | |
| Turnout | | 1,288 | 22.0 | −0.9 |
| Liberal Democrats hold | | Swing | | |

Leeds
| Party | Candidate | Votes | % | ±% |
|---|---|---|---|---|
| Conservative | Peter Parvin | 536 | 68.9 | −1.3 |
| Liberal Democrats | Sarah Gould | 141 | 18.1 | +1.9 |
| Labour | Elizabeth Stevens | 101 | 13.0 | −0.6 |
| Majority | | 395 | 50.8 | −3.2 |
| Turnout | | 778 | 41.5 | +5.5 |
| Conservative hold | | Swing | | |

Loose
| Party | Candidate | Votes | % | ±% |
|---|---|---|---|---|
| Liberal Democrats | Hugh Laing | 389 | 51.9 | +0.1 |
| Conservative | Michael Oben | 319 | 42.5 | −5.7 |
| Labour | Edith Davis | 42 | 5.6 | +5.6 |
| Majority | | 70 | 9.3 | +5.7 |
| Turnout | | 750 | 41.1 | +8.1 |
| Liberal Democrats hold | | Swing | | |

Marden and Yalding
| Party | Candidate | Votes | % | ±% |
|---|---|---|---|---|
| Conservative | Annabelle Blackmore | 1,079 | 62.3 | |
| Liberal Democrats | Patricia Gerrish | 317 | 18.3 | |
| Labour | Michael Jackson | 252 | 14.5 | |
| UKIP | Brian Hogg | 84 | 4.8 | |
| Majority | | 762 | 44.0 | |
| Turnout | | 1,732 | 29.6 | +0.5 |
| Conservative hold | | Swing | | |

North
| Party | Candidate | Votes | % | ±% |
|---|---|---|---|---|
| Liberal Democrats | Mervyn Warner | 849 | 58.4 | |
| Conservative | Jamie Devlin | 379 | 26.1 | |
| Labour | Keith Adkinson | 161 | 11.1 | |
| UKIP | Margaret Kendall | 65 | 4.5 | |
| Majority | | 470 | 32.3 | |
| Turnout | | 1,454 | 27.8 | −0.4 |
| Liberal Democrats hold | | Swing | | |

Shepway North
| Party | Candidate | Votes | % | ±% |
|---|---|---|---|---|
| Conservative | Marion Ring | 647 | 42.4 | |
| Labour | Wendy Marlow | 621 | 40.7 | |
| Liberal Democrats | Geoffrey Samme | 196 | 12.8 | |
| UKIP | Michael George | 62 | 4.1 | |
| Majority | | 26 | 1.7 | |
| Turnout | | 1,526 | 24.6 | −1.1 |
| Conservative gain from Labour | | Swing | | |

South
| Party | Candidate | Votes | % | ±% |
|---|---|---|---|---|
| Conservative | Alan Chell | 711 | 33.6 | |
| Independent | Alan Smith | 640 | 30.2 | |
| Liberal Democrats | John Wilson | 624 | 29.4 | |
| Labour | Allan Rimmer | 102 | 4.8 | |
| UKIP | Michael Oakley | 42 | 2.0 | |
| Majority | | 71 | 3.4 | |
| Turnout | | 2,119 | 36.6 | −0.4 |
| Conservative gain from Liberal Democrats | | Swing | | |

Staplehurst
| Party | Candidate | Votes | % | ±% |
|---|---|---|---|---|
| Conservative | Richard Lusty | 883 | 63.9 | |
| Liberal Democrats | Thomas Burnham | 328 | 23.7 | |
| Labour | Michael Casserley | 171 | 12.4 | |
| Majority | | 555 | 40.2 | |
| Turnout | | 1,382 | 30.0 | −1.6 |
| Conservative hold | | Swing | | |

Sutton Valence and Langley
| Party | Candidate | Votes | % | ±% |
|---|---|---|---|---|
| Conservative | Paulina Stockell | 524 | 75.7 | +5.0 |
| Liberal Democrats | Shona Stevens | 168 | 24.3 | −5.0 |
| Majority | | 356 | 51.4 | +9.9 |
| Turnout | | 692 | 31.7 | −1.3 |
| Conservative hold | | Swing | | |
