= 2003 Scottish local elections =

- 1 May 2003

All 1,222 seats to Scottish councils
- Turnout: 49.6%
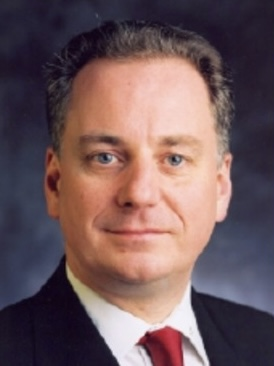

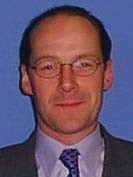

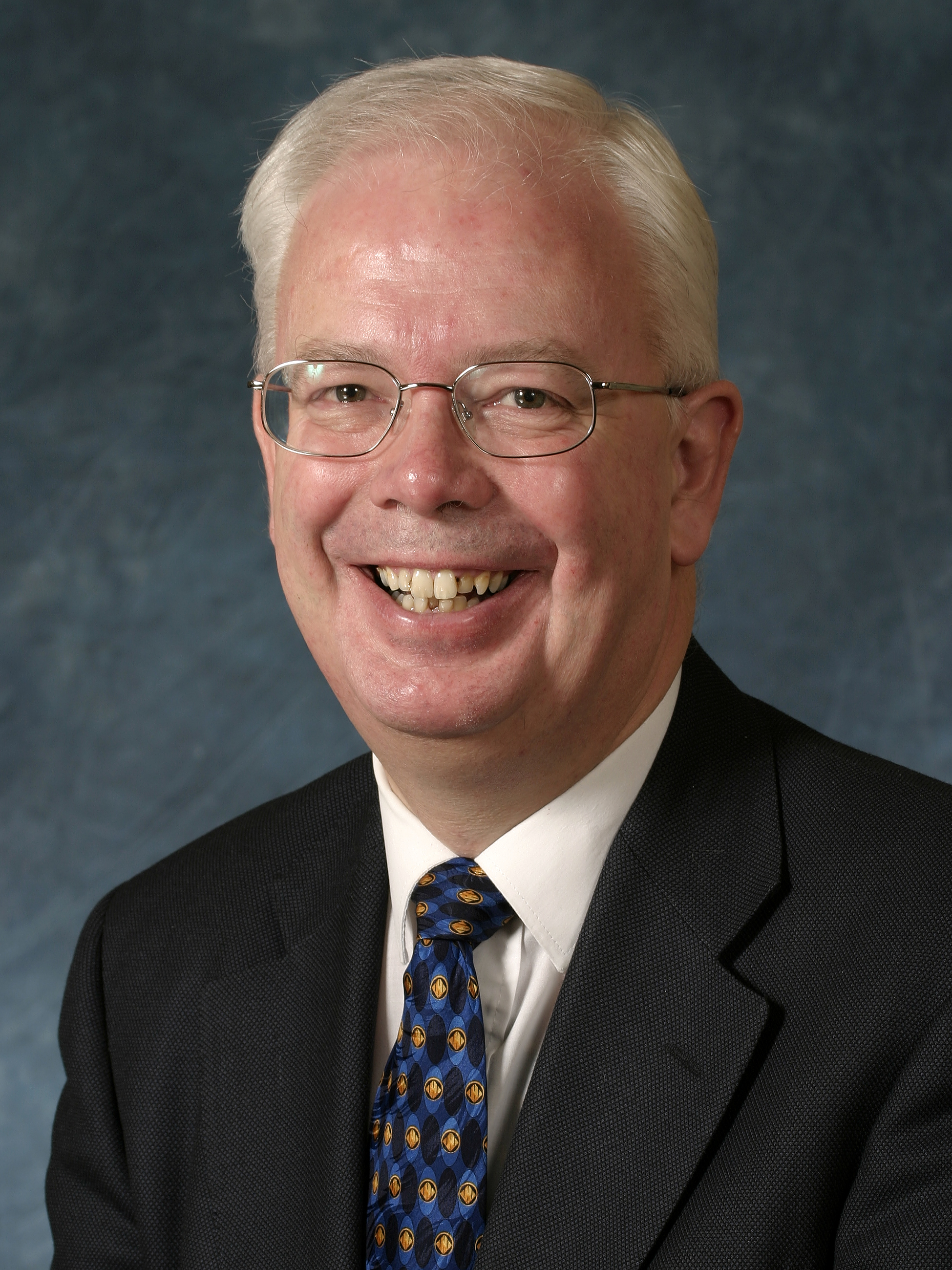

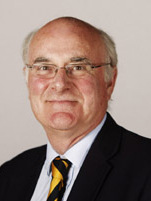
	First party	Second party
Leader	Jack McConnell	John Swinney
Party	Labour	SNP
Leader since	22 November 2001	23 September 2000
Seats won	509	181
Seat change	▼42	▼23
Popular vote	611,843	451,660
Percentage	32.6%	24.1%
Swing	▼3.7%	▼4.6%
	Third party	Fourth party
Leader	Jim Wallace	David McLetchie
Party	Liberal Democrats	Conservative
Leader since	18 April 1992	6 September 1998
Seats won	175	122
Seat change	▲18	▲14
Popular vote	272,057	282,895
Percentage	14.5%	15.1%
Swing	▲1.9%	▲1.6%
- Colours denote the winning party with outright control

- Colours denote the party with the most seats

- Colours denote party of the elected councillor for each ward

The 2003 Scottish local elections were held on 1 May 2003, the same day as Scottish Parliament elections and local elections in parts of England. All 32 Scottish councils had all their seats up for election – all Scottish councils are unitary authorities.

This was the last election for local government in Scotland to use the first past the post electoral system.

== Boundary changes ==
Minor council boundary changes took place to better reflect certain areas:

- Transfer of properties at Blackburn from Aberdeen City Council to Aberdeenshire Council
- Transfer of an area of land at West Farm, Broxburn from City of Edinburgh Council to West Lothian Council
- Transfer of an area of land and properties at Ardoch Sewage Works from Argyll & Bute Council to West Dunbartonshire Council
- Transfer of an area of land at Braehead from Glasgow City Council to Renfrewshire Council

== Results ==
Summary of the 1 May 2003 Scottish council election results
Parties	Votes	Votes %	+/-	Wards	Net Gain/Loss
Labour	611,843	32.6	−3.7%	509	−42
SNP	451,660	24.1	−4.6%	181	−23
Conservative	282,895	15.1	+1.6%	122	+14
Liberal Democrats	272,057	14.5	+1.9%	175	+18
Independent	189,749	10.1	+3.0%	230	+39
Other	67,533	3.6	+2.0%	4	−6
Total	1,875,737			1,222	

== Councils ==
Council	1999 result	Control before election (if different)	2003 result	Details
Aberdeen City	Labour	NOC	No overall control	Details
Aberdeenshire	No overall control		No overall control	Details
Angus	SNP		SNP	Details
Argyll and Bute	Independent		Independent	Details
Clackmannanshire	No overall control		Labour	Details
Dumfries and Galloway	Labour		No overall control	Details
Dundee City	No overall control		No overall control	Details
East Ayrshire	Labour		Labour	Details
East Dunbartonshire	No overall control		No overall control	Details
East Lothian	Labour		Labour	Details
East Renfrewshire	No overall control		No overall control	Details
City of Edinburgh	Labour		Labour	Details
Falkirk	Labour		No overall control	Details
Fife	Labour	Labour Minority	No overall control (Lab)	Details
Glasgow City	Labour		Labour	Details
Highland	Independent		Independent	Details
Inverclyde	Labour	NOC	Liberal Democrats	Details
Midlothian	Labour		Labour	Details
Moray	Independent		Independent	Details
Na h-Eileanan Siar	Independent		Independent	Details
North Ayrshire	Labour		Labour	Details
North Lanarkshire	Labour		Labour	Details
Orkney	Independent		Independent	Details
Perth and Kinross	No overall control		No overall control	Details
Renfrewshire	Labour		Labour	Details
Scottish Borders	No overall control		No overall control	Details
Shetland	Independent		Independent	Details
South Ayrshire	Labour	NOC	No overall control	Details
South Lanarkshire	Labour		No overall control (Lab minority)	Details
Stirling	No overall control (Lab minority)		Labour	Details
West Dunbartonshire	Labour	NOC (Ind+SNP+SSP)	Labour	Details
West Lothian	Labour		Labour	Details

== Notes and references ==
Preceded by 1999 Scottish local elections	Scottish local elections	Succeeded by 2007 Scottish local elections
