= 2003 Moray Council election =

2003 Scottish local government election

- 1 May 2003

All 26 seats to Moray Council 14 seats needed for a majority
	First party	Second party	Third party
Party	Independent	Labour	SNP
Last election	15 seats, 36.9%	6 seats, 20.5%	2 seats, 30.4%
Seats won	16	5	3
Seat change	▲1	▼1	▲1
Popular vote	14,084	3,622	7,194
Percentage	49.3%	12.7%	25.2%
Swing	▲12.4%	▼7.8%	▼5.2%
	Fourth party	Fifth party
Party	Liberal Democrats	Conservative
Last election	2 seats, 8.3%	1 seats, 3.8%
Seats won	1	1
Seat change	▼1	Steady
Popular vote	2,250	1,229
Percentage	7.9%	4.3%
Swing	▼0.4%	▲0.5%
- Map of ward results

- Council composition following the election
Convener before election
Edward Aldridge
Independent
Elected Convener
Edward Aldridge
Independent

Elections to Moray Council were held on 1 May 2003, on the same day as the other Scottish local government elections. This was the third election to the unitary council following the implementation of the Local Government etc. (Scotland) Act 1994.

The election used the 26 wards created by the Third Statutory Reviews of Electoral Arrangements in 1998. Each ward elected one councillor using first-past-the-post voting.

== Background ==
The 1999 election to the Moray Council saw the Independent group on the council expand by 13 seats, with the SNP losing 11. It is of note that the number of seats grew from 18 in 1995 to 26 in 1999.

1999 Moray Council election results
Party	Seats	Vote share
Independent	15	36.9%
Labour	6	20.5%
SNP	2	30.4%
Liberal Democrat	2	8.3%
Conservative	1	3.8%

== Results ==
2003 Moray Council election result
Party	Seats	Gains	Losses	Net gain/loss	Seats %	Votes %	Votes	+/−
Independent	16	2	1	▲1	61.5	49.3	14,084	▲12.4
Labour	5	0	1	▼1	19.2	12.7	3,622	▼7.8
SNP	3	2	1	▲1	11.5	25.2	7,194	▼5.2
Liberal Democrats	1	0	1	▼1	3.8	7.9	2,250	▼0.4
Conservative	1	0	0	Steady	3.8	4.3	1,229	▲0.5
Scottish Socialist	0	0	0	Steady	0.0	0.6	175	New
Total	26						28,554	

== Ward results ==
=== Buckie Central ===
Party	Candidate	Votes	%
Labour	John Leslie (incumbent)	406	41.2
Independent	Joe Mackay	316	32.0
SNP	Gordon McDonald	264	26.8
Majority		90	9.2
Turnout		986	40.9
Labour hold			

=== Buckie East & Findochty ===
Party	Candidate	Votes	%
Independent	Sinclair Longmore (incumbent)	406	36.5
SNP	Linda McDonald	355	31.9
Conservative	David Anderson	263	23.7
Liberal Democrats	Gordon Holm	88	7.9
Majority		51	4.6
Turnout		1,112	44.3
Independent hold			

=== Buckie West ===
Party	Candidate	Votes	%
Independent	William Jappy (incumbent)	682	67.7
SNP	Ian Hamilton	326	32.3
Majority		356	35.4
Turnout		1,008	41.3
Independent hold			

=== Burghsea ===
Party	Candidate	Votes	%
Independent	Eric McGillivray	636	43.4
Independent	Alastair MacKenzie	353	24.1
Independent	Cath Millar	204	13.9
SNP	Angus Munro	170	11.6
Liberal Democrats	Allison Bullock	103	7.0
Majority		283	19.3
Turnout		1,466	54.4
Independent gain from Liberal Democrats			

=== Cathedral ===
Party	Candidate	Votes	%
Labour	Ronald Sim	391	46.4
SNP	Hamish McDonald	259	30.8
Conservative	Alexander Thomson	136	16.2
Scottish Socialist	Norma Anderson	56	6.7
Majority		132	15.6
Turnout		842	36.7
Labour hold			

=== Central West ===
Party	Candidate	Votes	%
Independent	Alastair Bisset (incumbent)	919	70.2
SNP	Caroline Dunn	391	29.8
Majority		528	40.4
Turnout		1,310	50.1
Independent hold			

=== Elgin-Bishopmill East ===
Party	Candidate	Votes	%
Labour	Alexander Keith (incumbent)	794	67.5
SNP	Donald Morrison	282	24.0
Liberal Democrats	Mary McLintock	101	8.6
Majority		512	43.5
Turnout		1,167	43.5
Labour hold			

=== Elgin-Bishopmill West ===
Party	Candidate	Votes	%
Labour	Alan Burgess (incumbent)	431	35.1
Independent	Norman McKay	330	26.9
SNP	Elaine Cooper	203	16.5
Conservative	David Terron	187	15.2
Liberal Democrats	Peter Horton	78	6.3
Majority		101	8.2
Turnout		1,229	46.1
Labour hold			

=== Fife-Keith & Strathisla ===
Party	Candidate	Votes	%
Independent	Percy Watt (incumbent)	838	75.0
SNP	Keith Alderson	279	25.0
Majority		559	50.0
Turnout		1,117	45.8
Independent hold			

=== Finderne ===
Party	Candidate	Votes	%
Independent	Geoffrey Hamilton	Unopposed	
Independent hold			

=== Forres Central ===
Party	Candidate	Votes	%
Independent	Rex McIntosh (incumbent)	943	78.4
Liberal Democrats	Angela Cameron	260	21.6
Majority		683	56.8
Turnout		1,203	44.3
Independent hold			

=== Forres East ===
Party	Candidate	Votes	%
Conservative	Iain Young (incumbent)	643	47.8
Independent	Lorna Creswell	400	29.8
SNP	Jimmy Dingwall	206	15.3
Liberal Democrats	Sheila Cameron	95	7.1
Majority		243	18.0
Turnout		1,344	54.4
Conservative hold			

=== Forres West & Altyre ===
Party	Candidate	Votes	%
Independent	Alastair Urquhart (incumbent)	673	77.7
Liberal Democrats	Elizabeth Main	193	22.3
Majority		480	55.4
Turnout		866	40.1
Independent hold			

=== Glenlivet ===
Party	Candidate	Votes	%
Independent	Bob Wilson (incumbent)	607	59.0
SNP	Michael McConachie	421	41.0
Majority		186	18.0
Turnout		1,028	43.8
Independent hold			

=== Heldon & Laich ===
Party	Candidate	Votes	%
Independent	John Hogg (incumbent)	810	66.4
Liberal Democrats	Peter Bullock	207	17.0
SNP	Alastair Main	203	16.6
Majority		603	49.4
Turnout		1,220	53.0
Independent hold			

=== Innes ===
Party	Candidate	Votes	%
Independent	Eddie Coutts (incumbent)	637	48.6
SNP	Graeme McDonald	365	27.8
Liberal Democrats	Peter Cromar	263	20.1
Independent	Kenneth Stuart	46	3.5
Majority		272	20.8
Turnout		1,311	50.5
Independent hold			

=== Keith ===
Party	Candidate	Votes	%
Liberal Democrats	Linda Gorn (incumbent)	477	45.5
SNP	Rhona Paterson	273	26.0
Independent	Edwin Henderson	171	16.3
Labour	Mary McGregor	128	12.2
Majority		204	19.5
Turnout		1,049	44.2
Liberal Democrats hold			

=== Lennox ===
Party	Candidate	Votes	%
Independent	George McIntyre	506	40.7
SNP	Mike Watt	336	27.0
Independent	Robert Innes	213	17.1
Liberal Democrats	Michael Reid	120	9.7
Independent	William Graham	68	5.5
Majority		170	13.7
Turnout		1,243	52.1
Independent gain from SNP			

=== Lhanbryde & Birnie ===
Party	Candidate	Votes	%
Independent	Roma Hossack	687	61.4
Labour	Stephen McBean	267	23.9
Liberal Democrats	Donald Cameron	165	14.7
Majority		420	37.5
Turnout		1,119	48.2
Independent hold			

=== Lossiemouth East ===
Party	Candidate	Votes	%
Independent	Tom Bothwell	802	68.7
SNP	Iain Allan	366	31.3
Majority		436	37.4
Turnout		1,168	49.1
Independent hold			

=== Lossiemouth West ===
Party	Candidate	Votes	%
SNP	Joyce Stewart	522	52.8
Independent	Ian Frame	466	47.2
Majority		56	5.6
Turnout		988	38.2
SNP gain from Independent			

=== New Elgin East ===
Party	Candidate	Votes	%
Labour	John Divers	579	55.1
SNP	Graham Leadbitter	353	33.6
Scottish Socialist	Alexander MacGillivary	119	11.3
Majority		226	21.5
Turnout		1,051	42.9
Labour hold			

=== New Elgin West ===
Party	Candidate	Votes	%
SNP	Robert Burns	535	52.1
Labour	Muriel Ettles (incumbent)	491	47.9
Majority		44	4.2
Turnout		1,025	42.2
SNP gain from Labour			

=== Rathford ===
Party	Candidate	Votes	%
Independent	Ron Shepherd (incumbent)	607	47.4
Independent	Daniel Cook	530	41.4
SNP	Margaret Hamilton	144	11.2
Majority		77	6.0
Turnout		1,281	55.4
Independent hold			

=== Rural Keith & Rothes ===
Party	Candidate	Votes	%
SNP	Pearl Paul (incumbent)	581	54.4
Independent	Gordon Henderson	252	23.6
Labour	Shuna Dicks	135	12.6
Liberal Democrats	James Milton	100	9.4
Majority		329	30.8
Turnout		1,068	47.7
SNP hold			

=== Speyside ===
Party	Candidate	Votes	%
Independent	Edward Aldridge (incumbent)	982	73.2
SNP	Peter Farquharson	360	26.8
Majority		682	46.4
Turnout		1,342	51.6
Independent hold			

== Aftermath ==
=== Buckie West by-election ===
On 1 July 2004 a by-election was held in the Buckie West ward after the death of independent councillor Bill Jappy. It was won by independent candidate Joseph Mackay.

Buckie West by-election (1 July 2004)
Party	Candidate	Votes	%
Independent	Joseph Mackay	552	63.6
SNP	Gordon McDonald	196	22.6
Conservative	Ian Moir	89	10.3
Liberal Democrats	Gordon Holms	31	3.6
Majority		356	41.0
Independent hold			

=== August 2004 Speyside by-election ===
On 4 June 2004, independent councillor Edward Aldridge, convener of the Moray Council, resigned after pleading guilty to fraud. On 12 August 2004 a by-election was held in the Speyside ward, and was won by the SNP candidate.

Speyside by-election (11 November 2004)
Party	Candidate	Votes	%
SNP	-	286	30.8
Independent	-	244	26.3
Independent	-	187	20.1
Conservative	-	121	13.0
Independent	-	91	9.8
Majority		42	4.5
SNP gain from Independent			

=== November 2004 Speyside by-election ===
On 11 November 2004 a by-election was held in the Speyside ward, and was won by independent candidate Andrina Taylor.

Speyside by-election (12 August 2004)
Party	Candidate	Votes	%
Independent	Andrina Taylor	383	37.6
Conservative	-	242	23.8
Independent	-	232	22.8
Independent	-	99	9.7
Liberal Democrats	-	62	6.1
Majority		141	13.8
Independent gain from SNP			
