= 2003 Aberdeenshire Council election =

2003 Scottish local government election

- 1 May 2003

All 68 seats to Aberdeenshire Council 35 seats needed for a majority
	First party	Second party
Party	Liberal Democrats	SNP
Last election	28 seats, 32.8%	23 seats, 29.4%
Seats won	28	18
Seat change	Steady	▼5
Popular vote	27,953	23,068
Percentage	33.5%	27.6%
Swing	▲0.7%	▼1.8%
	Third party	Fourth party
Party	Conservative	Independent
Last election	7 seats, 18.4%	10 seats, 14.3%
Seats won	11	11
Seat change	▲4	▲1
Popular vote	17,511	12,086
Percentage	21.0%	14.5%
Swing	▲2.6%	▲0.2%
- Map of ward results

Elections to Aberdeenshire Council were held on 1 May 2003, on the same day as the other Scottish local government elections. This was the third election to the unitary council following the implementation of the Local Government etc. (Scotland) Act 1994.

The election used the 68 wards created by the Third Statutory Reviews of Electoral Arrangements in 1998. Each ward elected one councillor using first-past-the-post voting.

== Background ==
=== Previous election ===
At the previous election in 1999, the Liberal Democrats won 28 seats, falling 7 short of an overall majority. The Scottish National Party (SNP) won 23 seats, falling 12 short an overall majority. Independents won 10, and the Conservatives won 7, both also falling well short of an overall majority.

1999 Aberdeenshire Council election result
Party	Seats	Vote share
Liberal Democrats	28	32.8%
SNP	23	29.4%
Independent	10	14.3%
Conservative	7	18.4%

=== Composition ===
There were several changes to the composition of the council during the 1999–2003 term.

Composition of Aberdeenshire Council
Party	1999 seats	Dissolution
Liberal Democrats	28	27
SNP	23	22
Independent	10	10
Conservative	7	9

== Results ==
2003 Aberdeenshire Council election result
Party	Seats	Gains	Losses	Net gain/loss	Seats %	Votes %	Votes	+/−
Liberal Democrats	28			Steady	41.2	33.5	27,953	▲0.7
SNP	18			▼5	26.5	27.6	23,068	▼1.8
Conservative	11			▲4	16.2	21.0	17,511	▲2.6
Independent	11			▲1	16.2	14.5	12,086	▲0.2
Labour	0			Steady	0.0	3.3	2,743	▼1.7
Scottish Socialist	0			Steady	0.0	0.2	189	New

== Ward results ==
=== Aberchirder ===
Aberchirder
Party	Candidate	Votes	%	±%
SNP	Kenneth Benzie*	598	59.4	+18.1
Conservative	Sandy Buchan	409	40.6	N/A
Majority		189	18.8	+13.1
Turnout		1007	43.6	−7.9
SNP hold		Swing		

=== Aboyne ===
Aboyne
Party	Candidate	Votes	%	±%
Liberal Democrats	Peter Argyle*	853	56.8	+13.1
Conservative	Anne Harper	488	32.5	−3.5
Independent	Neil Williams	162	10.8	N/A
Majority		365	24.3	+16.6
Turnout		1503	57.5	−8.3
Liberal Democrats hold		Swing		

=== Alford ===
Alford
Party	Candidate	Votes	%	±%
Liberal Democrats	Richard Stroud*	961	72.8	+15.8
Conservative	Lindsay Ferguson	359	27.2	+3.8
Majority		602	45.6	+12.0
Turnout		1320	49.4	−6.3
Liberal Democrats hold		Swing		

=== Banchory East & Crathes ===
Banchory East & Crathes
Party	Candidate	Votes	%	±%
Independent	Jenny Watson*	405	30.6	+3.2
SNP	Linda Clark	335	25.3	+14.9
Liberal Democrats	Kathryn Watt	333	25.2	+8.8
Conservative	Charles Insch	249	18.8	+0.7
Majority		70	5.3	−2.2
Turnout		1322	55.0	−7.0
Independent hold		Swing		

=== Banchory West ===
Banchory West
Party	Candidate	Votes	%	±%
Independent	Norma Makin*	1,101	78.5	+4.6
Liberal Democrats	Colin Gale	302	21.5	+3.8
Majority		799	57.0	+0.8
Turnout		1404	52.1	−8.6
Independent hold		Swing		

=== Banff ===
Banff
Party	Candidate	Votes	%	±%
SNP	John Cox*	595	56.3	−16.5
Independent	Richard Evans	301	28.5	N/A
Independent	Richard Kelbie	83	7.9	N/A
Liberal Democrats	Scott Coghill	77	7.3	−6.5
Majority		294	27.8	−31.2
Turnout		1056	45.1	−12.8
SNP hold		Swing		

=== Banff West & Boyndie ===
Banff West & Boyndie
Party	Candidate	Votes	%	±%
SNP	Jeanette McKee*	752	73.1	+27.3
Conservative	Gwen Walker	182	17.7	N/A
Liberal Democrats	Dominique-Paul Lonchay	95	9.2	−6.2
Majority		570	55.4	+31.6
Turnout		1029	45.1	−14.0
SNP hold		Swing		

=== Belhevie ===
Belhevie
Party	Candidate	Votes	%	±%
Liberal Democrats	Debra Storr*	490	38.3	−5.3
SNP	Jane Macaskill	350	27.4	+2.9
Conservative	James Gifford	268	21.0	+3.0
Labour	Richard Winchester	170	13.3	−0.6
Majority		140	10.9	−8.2
Turnout		1278	48.3	−6.7
Liberal Democrats hold		Swing		

=== Blackhouse ===
Blackhouse
Party	Candidate	Votes	%	±%
SNP	Anne Fowler*	616	60.5	−5.6
Conservative	Bill Kenny	261	25.6	−8.3
Liberal Democrats	Helen Mair	142	13.9	N/A
Majority		355	34.9	+2.7
Turnout		1019	39.8	−10.6
SNP hold		Swing		

=== Boddam-Inverugie ===
Boddam-Inverugie
Party	Candidate	Votes	%	±%
Liberal Democrats	Samuel Coull*	570	50.4	−11.4
SNP	Raymond Matthew	561	49.6	+11.4
Majority		9	0.8	−22.7
Turnout		1131	44.0	−8.2
Liberal Democrats hold		Swing		

=== Buchan North ===
Buchan North
Party	Candidate	Votes	%	±%
SNP	Mitchell Burnett*	545	50.2	−7.4
Independent	Marjory Rennie	306	28.2	−1.9
Independent	Wilson Irvine	235	21.6	N/A
Majority		239	22.0	−5.5
Turnout		1086	47.0	−11.8
SNP hold		Swing		

=== Buchan North East ===
Buchan North East
Party	Candidate	Votes	%	±%
Independent	Dennis Duthie	597	60.4	N/A
SNP	Margaret McRae*	338	34.2	N/A
Liberal Democrats	Peter Morgan	53	5.4	N/A
Majority		259	26.2	N/A
Turnout		988	N/A	N/A
Independent gain from SNP		Swing		

The Buchan North East ward had previously been uncontested at the 1999 council election.

=== Buchanhaven ===
Buchanhaven
Party	Candidate	Votes	%	±%
SNP	Agnes Strachan*	785	85.0	N/A
Liberal Democrats	Gordon Milne	138	15.0	N/A
Majority		647	70.0	N/A
Turnout		923	N/A	N/A
SNP hold		Swing		

The Buchanhaven ward had previously been uncontested at the 1999 council election.

=== Central Buchan ===
Central Buchan
Party	Candidate	Votes	%	±%
SNP	Stanley Tennant*	678	53.4	+1.5
Conservative	Edie Chapman	592	46.7	+16.8
Majority		86	6.7	−15.3
Turnout		1270	49.7	−8.8
SNP hold		Swing		

=== Chapel & Gadie ===
Chapel & Gadie
Party	Candidate	Votes	%	±%
Liberal Democrats	Martin Kitts-Hayes	605	46.9	+7.0
Conservative	Ailish Bell	342	26.5	+15.8
SNP	Jennifer Lawless	189	14.7	+1.6
Labour	Ann Thorpe	153	11.9	−0.5
Majority		263	20.4	+4.4
Turnout		1289	55.6	−6.8
Liberal Democrats hold		Swing		

=== Clerkhill ===
Clerkhill
Party	Candidate	Votes	%	±%
SNP	James Davidson*	838	80.0	N/A
Liberal Democrats	Scott Middleton	210	20.0	N/A
Majority		620	60.0	N/A
Turnout		1048	N/A	N/A
SNP hold		Swing		

The Clerkhill ward had previously been uncontested at the 1999 council election.

=== Cruden ===
Cruden
Party	Candidate	Votes	%	±%
SNP	James Towers*	725	63.0	+2.9
Liberal Democrats	Elizabeth May	426	37.0	+23.9
Majority		299	26.0	−7.2
Turnout		1151	50.5	−11.7
SNP hold		Swing		

=== Dales-Towerhill ===
Dales-Towerhill
Party	Candidate	Votes	%	±%
SNP	Stuart Pratt*	710	79.5	+3.8
Liberal Democrats	Alistair Mason	183	20.5	−3.8
Majority		527	59.0	+7.6
Turnout		893	37.8	−14.6
SNP hold		Swing		

=== Donside & Cromar ===
Donside & Cromar
Party	Candidate	Votes	%	±%
Conservative	Bruce Luffman*	945	65.1	+26.1
Liberal Democrats	Ian Findlay	350	24.1	−6.2
SNP	John Robertson	156	10.8	−12.3
Majority		595	41.0	+32.4
Turnout		1451	54.5	−4.3
Conservative hold		Swing		

=== Durn ===
Durn
Party	Candidate	Votes	%	±%
Liberal Democrats	Jack Mair	680	53.7	+10.7
SNP	Ian Gray	586	46.3	−10.7
Majority		94	7.4	−6.7
Turnout		1266	55.8	−7.5
Liberal Democrats gain from SNP		Swing		

=== Echt ===
Echt
Party	Candidate	Votes	%	±%
Liberal Democrats	Gurudeo Saluja*	744	54.4	+9.0
Independent	Ronald Wilkie	366	26.8	N/A
Conservative	John Duncan	258	18.9	−11.2
Majority		378	27.6	+12.2
Turnout		1368	50.5	−6.6
Liberal Democrats hold		Swing		

=== Ellon Town ===
Ellon Town
Party	Candidate	Votes	%	±%
SNP	Alan Cameron*	636	46.8	+11.7
Liberal Democrats	Isobel Davidson	406	29.9	−2.6
Conservative	Alan Benton	216	15.9	−4.4
Labour	William McConnach	102	7.5	−4.6
Majority		230	16.9	+14.3
Turnout		1360	57.1	−0.1
SNP hold		Swing		

=== Elrick ===
Elrick
Party	Candidate	Votes	%	±%
Independent	Mark Cullen	638	50.6	N/A
Liberal Democrats	Alan Findlay	436	34.6	−22.1
Conservative	Charles McKail	186	14.8	−4.1
Majority		202	16.0	−16.2
Turnout		1260	56.2	−2.0
Independent gain from Liberal Democrats		Swing		

=== Fraserburgh East ===
Fraserburgh East
Party	Candidate	Votes	%	±%
SNP	Ian Tait*	654	60.9	−11.4
Independent	Robert Sim	360	33.5	N/A
Liberal Democrats	Valerie Cameron	60	5.6	−22.1
Majority		294	27.4	−17.2
Turnout		1074	45.5	−9.1
SNP hold		Swing		

=== Fraserburgh North ===
Fraserburgh North
Party	Candidate	Votes	%	±%
SNP	Andrew Ritchie	534	54.7	−15.9
Independent	Rosie Donaldson	286	29.3	N/A
Independent	James Milne	156	16.0	N/A
Majority		248	25.4	−15.7
Turnout		976	42.9	−12.3
SNP hold		Swing		

=== Fraserburgh South ===
Fraserburgh South
Party	Candidate	Votes	%	±%
Independent	Helen Fowler*	629	57.0	+0.5
SNP	Carol Macdonald	475	43.0	−0.5
Majority		154	14.0	+1.0
Turnout		1104	46.1	−9.9
Independent hold		Swing		

=== Fraserburgh West ===
Fraserburgh West
Party	Candidate	Votes	%	±%
SNP	Brian Topping*	683	68.3	N/A
Independent	Michael Watt	317	31.7	N/A
Majority		366	36.6	N/A
Turnout		1000	N/A	N/A
SNP hold		Swing		

The Fraserburgh West ward had previously been uncontested at the 1999 council election.

=== Fyvie-Methlick ===
Fyvie-Methlick
Party	Candidate	Votes	%	±%
Liberal Democrats	Elizabeth Robertson*	786	73.5	+15.6
SNP	Alexander Duncan	218	20.4	+7.3
Labour	Barrie Bird	66	6.2	−0.7
Majority		568	53.1	+17.4
Turnout		1070	46.4	−12.6
Liberal Democrats hold		Swing		

=== Gamrie-King Edward ===
Gamrie-King Edward
Party	Candidate	Votes	%	±%
Conservative	John Duncan	685	60.3	N/A
SNP	David Benzie	451	39.7	−5.5
Majority		234	20.6	+20.0
Turnout		1136	48.6	−2.4
Conservative gain from SNP		Swing		

=== Huntly East ===
Huntly East
Party	Candidate	Votes	%	±%
Conservative	Alexander Buchan	453	35.2	+26.7
Liberal Democrats	Adrian Reeves	408	31.7	−7.2
SNP	Robert Ness	294	22.8	+8.5
Labour	Dick Carroll	132	10.3	+4.6
Majority		45	3.5	−2.9
Turnout		1287	45.8	−9.5
Conservative gain from Liberal Democrats		Swing		

=== Huntly West ===
Huntly West
Party	Candidate	Votes	%	±%
SNP	Joanna Strathdee*	568	54.3	+21.0
Liberal Democrats	Jody Stewart	192	18.4	−8.3
Conservative	Douglas Cowie	157	15.0	+2.6
Labour	Dorothy Norrie	129	12.3	+3.4
Majority		376	35.9	+29.3
Turnout		1046	44.3	−5.4
SNP hold		Swing		

=== Insch ===
Insch
Party	Candidate	Votes	%	±%
Liberal Democrats	Sheena Lonchay*	621	45.5	−4.9
Conservative	Peter Donaldson	459	33.6	+15.9
SNP	Amanda Allen	192	14.1	−1.4
Labour	Rita Barton	94	6.9	−1.2
Majority		162	11.9	−20.9
Turnout		1366	50.3	−4.9
Liberal Democrats hold		Swing		

=== Inverbevie, Gourdon & Johnshaven ===
Inverburie, Gourdon & Johnshaven
Party	Candidate	Votes	%	±%
Liberal Democrats	David Smith*	763	61.0	+17.1
SNP	William Langdon	286	22.9	−16.2
Conservative	Brian Bartlett	202	16.1	−0.9
Majority		477	38.1	+33.3
Turnout		1251	45.7	−8.3
Liberal Democrats hold		Swing		

=== Inverurie Central ===
Inverurie Central
Party	Candidate	Votes	%	±%
Liberal Democrats	Heather Bisset*	764	60.7	−1.5
Conservative	Fiona Peebles	198	15.7	+5.4
SNP	Archie McDiarmid	144	11.4	−2.8
Labour	William Daly	128	10.2	−3.1
Independent	Michael Shread	24	1.9	N/A
Majority		566	45.0	−3.0
Turnout		1258	48.9	−9.5
Liberal Democrats hold		Swing		

=== Inverurie North ===
Inverurie North
Party	Candidate	Votes	%	±%
Liberal Democrats	Michael Raeburn*	379	38.2	−3.3
SNP	Iain Gifford	212	21.4	+0.5
Conservative	Richard Cowling	200	20.2	+1.4
Labour	Ellis Thorpe	200	20.2	+1.4
Majority		167	16.8	−3.8
Turnout		991	41.9	−12.7
Liberal Democrats hold		Swing		

=== Inverurie South & Port Elphinstone ===
Inverurie South & Port Elphinstone
Party	Candidate	Votes	%	±%
Liberal Democrats	Raymond Bisset*	778	61.5	+2.1
SNP	Susan Gifford	184	14.5	−3.5
Labour	Sheila Bousfield	133	10.5	−0.8
Conservative	Dennis Churcher	132	10.4	−0.9
Scottish Socialist	John Sangster	39	3.1	N/A
Majority		594	47.0	+5.6
Turnout		1266	46.6	−9.9
Liberal Democrats hold		Swing		

=== Kemnay ===
Kemnay
Party	Candidate	Votes	%	±%
Liberal Democrats	Alister Leitch*	784	66.2	+11.7
Conservative	Sheila Taylor	401	33.8	+18.9
Majority		383	32.4	+8.6
Turnout		1185	47.6	−4.6
Liberal Democrats hold		Swing		

=== Kinellar & Westhill North ===
Kinellar & Westhill North
Party	Candidate	Votes	%	±%
Liberal Democrats	John McGregor*	893	61.3	+11.3
Conservative	William Leslie	423	29.0	+7.5
Labour	James McPherson	141	9.7	+0.2
Majority		470	32.3	+3.7
Turnout		1457	57.0	−3.0
Liberal Democrats hold		Swing		

=== Kintore & Keithhall ===
Kintore & Keithhall
Party	Candidate	Votes	%	±%
Conservative	Douglas Cameron*	614	41.3	+4.2
Liberal Democrats	Gina Ford	556	37.4	+2.8
SNP	David Gorman	208	14.0	−4.9
Labour	Gillian Jones	110	7.4	−2.0
Majority		58	3.9	+1.4
Turnout		1478	56.2	−5.9
Conservative hold		Swing		

=== Logie Buchan ===
Logie Buchan
Party	Candidate	Votes	%	±%
Liberal Democrats	James Anderson*	500	36.3	−14.9
SNP	Robert Merson	461	33.5	−4.3
Conservative	Charles Gordon	283	20.5	N/A
Labour	Albert McLean-Bullen	134	9.7	−1.2
Majority		39	2.8	−10.6
Turnout		1378	49.4	−8.9
Liberal Democrats hold		Swing		

=== Lonmay & St Fergus ===
Lonmay & St Fergus
Party	Candidate	Votes	%	±%
Independent	John Gibbins	1,031	69.5	N/A
SNP	Elaine Ward	452	30.5	−1.0
Majority		579	39.0	+8.9
Turnout		1483	61.5	−6.9
Independent hold		Swing		

=== Lower Deeside ===
Lower Deeside
Party	Candidate	Votes	%	±%
Conservative	Alexander Wallace*	781	56.1	+23.5
Liberal Democrats	James Piggins	407	29.2	+11.2
SNP	Stephen McKerron	204	14.7	−3.5
Majority		374	26.9	+17.3
Turnout		1392	52.4	−7.7
Conservative hold		Swing		

=== Macduff ===
Macduff
Party	Candidate	Votes	%	±%
SNP	Sydney Mair*	686	80.3	+−0.0
Liberal Democrats	Sheila Ritchie	168	19.7	+−0.0
Majority		518	60.6	+−0.0
Turnout		854	37.8	−14.4
SNP hold		Swing		

Though the number of raw votes decreased with the turnout, the percentage vote shares for both the SNP and the Liberal Democrats remained exactly as they were for the previous 1999 council election.

=== Mearns Central ===
Mearns Central
Party	Candidate	Votes	%	±%
Liberal Democrats	Thomas Fleming	609	48.3	+34.3
SNP	Susan Speirs	358	28.4	+2.4
Independent	Ian Frain*	294	23.3	−12.2
Majority		251	19.9	+10.3
Turnout		1261	53.8	+0.7
Liberal Democrats gain from Independent		Swing		

=== Mearns North ===
Mearns North
Party	Candidate	Votes	%	±%
Independent	George Swapp*	1,146	79.8	+12.0
Liberal Democrats	Margaret Hille	290	20.2	+9.7
Majority		856	59.6	+2.8
Turnout		1436	54.8	−6.9
Independent hold		Swing		

== Aftermath ==
=== By-elections ===
==== Huntly East by-election ====
On 9 June 2005 a by-election was held in the Huntly East ward. The Scottish Conservative's Moira Ingleby held the seat.

Party	Candidate	Votes	%
Conservative	Moira Ingleby	419	34.3
Liberal Democrats	Eleanor Anderson	360	29.5
SNP	Robert Ness	224	18.3
Independent	Hamish Jolly	181	14.8
Labour	Bryan Begg	38	3.1
Majority		59	4.8
Conservative hold			
