= 2003 West Lothian Council election =

2003 Scottish local government election

- 1 May 2003

All 32 seats to West Lothian Council 17 seats needed for a majority
	First party	Second party
Party	Labour	SNP
Last election	20 seats, 45.1%	11 seats, 41.6%
Seats won	18	12
Seat change	▼2	▲1
Popular vote	25,356	21,184
Percentage	43.5%	36.3%
Swing	▼1.6%	▼5.3%
	Third party	Fourth party
Party	Conservative	Independent
Last election	1 seat, 8.6%	0 seats, 0.2%
Seats won	1	1
Seat change	Steady	▲1
Popular vote	5,390	1,463
Percentage	9.2%	2.5%
Swing	▲0.6%	▲2.3%
- The 32 single member wards

- Council composition following the election

Elections to West Lothian Council were held on 1 May 2003, on the same day as the other Scottish local government elections. This was the third election to the unitary council following the implementation of the Local Government etc. (Scotland) Act 1994.

The election used the 32 wards created by the Third Statutory Reviews of Electoral Arrangements in 1998. Each ward elected one councillor using first-past-the-post voting.

== Results ==
2003 West Lothian Council election result
Party	Seats	Gains	Losses	Net gain/loss	Seats %	Votes %	Votes	+/−
Labour	18			▼2	56.3	43.5	25,356	▼1.6
SNP	12			▲1	37.5	36.3	21,184	▼5.3
Conservative	1			Steady	3.1	9.2	5,390	▲0.6
Independent	1			▲1	3.1	2.5	1,463	▲2.3
Liberal Democrats	0	0	0	Steady	0.0	7.0	4,100	▲2.5
Scottish Socialist	0	0	0	Steady	0.0	1.4	842	New

== Results by ward (A-Z) ==
An asterisk (*) indicates an incumbent candidate.

Two asterisks (**) indicates an incumbent candidate standing for re-election in a different ward.

Almond
Party	Candidate	Votes	%	±%
Labour	James Swan*	903	52.2	+1.1
SNP	Mary Dickson	638	36.9	+−0.0
Conservative	Edward Sargeson	105	6.1	−1.4
Liberal Democrats	Geoffrey King	85	4.9	+0.3
Majority		265	15.3	+1.1
Turnout		1731	46.5	−14.2
Labour hold		Swing		

Armadale Central
Party	Candidate	Votes	%	±%
SNP	Jim Sibbald*	849	55.6	+3.9
Labour	Robert Bell	551	36.1	−2.8
Conservative	Martha Wallace	75	4.9	−4.5
Liberal Democrats	Jean Kershaw	52	3.4	N/A
Majority		298	19.5	+6.7
Turnout		1527	42.0	−15.6
SNP hold		Swing		

Armadale West
Party	Candidate	Votes	%	±%
Independent	Duncan Maclean*	655	36.1	N/A
Labour	Jim Dixon	559	30.8	−7.0
SNP	Isabel Hutton	538	29.6	−22.5
Liberal Democrats	Peter Kershaw	64	3.5	−1.4
Majority		96	5.3	−9.0
Turnout		1816	47.6	−10.1
Independent gain from SNP		Swing		

Councillor Maclean was originally elected for the Scottish National Party at the 1999 council election, but sought re-election as an independent. He ultimately won re-election.

Blackburn
Party	Candidate	Votes	%	±%
Labour	William Russell*	974	52.5	−5.8
SNP	Edward Fowler	751	40.5	+3.3
Conservative	Evelyn Stirling	66	3.6	−0.9
Liberal Democrats	William Wylie	65	3.5	N/A
Majority		223	12.0	−9.1
Turnout		1856	49.0	−11.7
Labour hold		Swing		

Boghall
Party	Candidate	Votes	%	±%
SNP	Audrey Gordon*	787	50.7	−2.1
Labour	Harry Cartmill	602	38.8	−0.1
Conservative	John Baird	87	5.6	−2.7
Liberal Democrats	Catherine Smith	75	4.8	N/A
Majority		185	11.9	−2.0
Turnout		1551	44.6	−12.5
SNP hold		Swing		

Breich Valley
Party	Candidate	Votes	%	±%
Labour	Joe Thomas*	925	55.8	−0.9
SNP	Frank Higgins	444	26.8	−8.1
Liberal Democrats	Margaret Riddoch	150	9.0	N/A
Conservative	Charles Welwood	139	8.4	−0.1
Majority		481	29.0	+7.2
Turnout		1658	41.9	−13.7
Labour hold		Swing		

Calderwood
Party	Candidate	Votes	%	±%
Labour	William Dunn*	863	43.2	−7.7
SNP	Gordon Irvine	598	29.9	−19.2
Conservative	James Torpichen	196	9.8	N/A
Independent	David Armit	192	9.6	N/A
Liberal Democrats	Norman Reid	148	7.4	N/A
Majority		265	13.3	+11.4
Turnout		1997	52.4	−10.2
Labour hold		Swing		

Carmondean
Party	Candidate	Votes	%	±%
SNP	Angela Constance*	985	56.1	+5.8
Labour	Raymond Simpson	599	34.1	−0.8
Conservative	Paul Hewitt	173	9.8	+2.7
Majority		386	22.0	+6.6
Turnout		1757	47.1	−6.9
SNP hold		Swing		

Craigshill
Party	Candidate	Votes	%	±%
SNP	Frank Anderson*	629	46.1	−7.1
Labour	John Duncan	521	38.2	−8.6
Scottish Socialist	Kenneth Davies	146	10.7	N/A
Conservative	Carol Buchanan	69	5.1	N/A
Majority		108	7.9	+1.6
Turnout		1365	38.9	−13.2
SNP hold		Swing		

Croftmalloch
Party	Candidate	Votes	%	±%
SNP	James Dickson*	766	47.3	+0.6
Labour	George Paul	589	36.4	−3.3
Conservative	Ian Wilson	186	11.5	−2.1
Liberal Democrats	Stephen Glenn	77	4.8	N/A
Majority		177	10.9	+3.9
Turnout		1618	44.6	−12.9
SNP hold		Swing		

Deans
Party	Candidate	Votes	%	±%
Labour	Hugh Owens*	955	59.2	+1.5
SNP	Innes MacPherson	469	29.1	−7.6
Liberal Democrats	Mark Eyre	103	6.4	N/A
Conservative	Bryan Ross	87	5.4	−0.2
Majority		486	30.1	+9.0
Turnout		1614	40.9	−13.1
Labour hold		Swing		

Dedridge
Party	Candidate	Votes	%	±%
Labour	Danny Logue*	1,072	59.2	+3.2
SNP	Greg McCarra	740	40.8	−3.2
Majority		332	18.4	+6.4
Turnout		1812	45.0	−9.5
Labour hold		Swing		

Durhamtoun
Party	Candidate	Votes	%	±%
Labour	John McGinty*	972	60.3	+8.0
SNP	Thomas McNulty	433	26.8	−8.5
Conservative	Florence Ghent	119	7.4	+−0.0
Liberal Democrats	Catherine Smith	89	5.5	+0.5
Majority		539	33.5	+16.5
Turnout		1613	58.0	−1.5
Labour hold		Swing		

East Calder
Party	Candidate	Votes	%	±%
Labour	Dave King*	1,284	63.5	−0.1
Independent	Willie Renwick	370	18.3	N/A
SNP	Angela Lynch	289	14.3	−11.9
Conservative	Julia Hewitt	80	4.0	−1.2
Majority		914	45.2	+7.8
Turnout		2023	52.0	−15.7
Labour hold		Swing		

Easton
Party	Candidate	Votes	%	±%
SNP	Stuart Borrowman	898	47.3	+11.4
Labour	Heather Smart*	797	42.0	−10.7
Conservative	Sheila Grierson	83	4.4	−2.0
Scottish Socialist	George Mackin	61	3.2	N/A
Liberal Democrats	Charles Corser	59	3.1	−1.9
Majority		101	5.3	−11.4
Turnout		1898	53.3	−7.1
SNP gain from Labour		Swing		

Fauldhouse
Party	Candidate	Votes	%	±%
Labour	Neil Findlay	1,265	64.7	+8.8
SNP	Neil Forsyth	579	29.6	−5.9
Conservative	Alan Huyton	110	5.6	+0.1
Majority		686	35.1	+14.8
Turnout		1954	49.5	−10.7
Labour hold		Swing		

Houstoun
Party	Candidate	Votes	%	±%
Labour	Alex Davidson*	1,171	61.1	−0.9
SNP	Halina Hinton	454	23.7	−14.3
Liberal Democrats	Alisa Wardrop	182	9.5	N/A
Scottish Socialist	Robert Richard	111	5.8	N/A
Majority		717	37.4	+13.5
Turnout		1918	49.4	−10.3
Labour hold		Swing		

Howden
Party	Candidate	Votes	%	±%
Labour	Wendy Mutch*	758	44.7	−0.3
SNP	James Adens	743	43.8	−1.1
Liberal Democrats	Margaret Lamond	196	11.5	+1.5
Majority		15	0.9	+0.8
Turnout		1697	45.9	−10.5
Labour hold		Swing		

Kingsfield
Party	Candidate	Votes	%	±%
Conservative	Tom Kerr*	1,557	59.9	+8.8
SNP	Moray Hamilton	430	16.6	−6.3
Labour	Sarah Lee	376	14.5	−1.3
Liberal Democrats	Graham Wenham	235	9.0	−1.2
Majority		1127	43.3	+15.1
Turnout		2598	61.7	−11.4
Conservative hold		Swing		

Kirkton
Party	Candidate	Votes	%	±%
SNP	Andrew Miller*	828	47.0	−7.7
Labour	Stuart Duffin	525	29.8	−5.7
Liberal Democrats	Carol Howden	222	12.6	N/A
Conservative	Hugh Morrison	187	10.6	+0.8
Majority		303	17.2	−1.9
Turnout		1762	61.0	+2.7
SNP hold		Swing		

Knightsbridge
Party	Candidate	Votes	%	±%
Labour	Bruce Ferrie*	875	50.0	+2.4
SNP	Robert de Bold	486	27.8	−12.0
Conservative	Alison Ross	178	10.2	−2.4
Liberal Democrats	Ian Keith	129	7.4	N/A
Scottish Socialist	Thomas Franks	83	4.7	N/A
Majority		389	32.2	+24.4
Turnout		1751	43.7	−11.1
Labour hold		Swing		

Ladywell
Party	Candidate	Votes	%	±%
SNP	Peter Johnston*	1,105	75.8	+3.1
Labour	Mohammed Hanif	284	19.5	−5.1
Liberal Democrats	Robert Howden	68	4.7	N/A
Majority		821	56.3	+8.2
Turnout		1457	42.9	−12.8
SNP hold		Swing		

Limefield
Party	Candidate	Votes	%	±%
Labour	Carol Bartholomew*	1,087	61.9	+2.7
SNP	John Richardson	487	27.7	−6.3
Conservative	Margaret Wilson	182	10.4	+3.6
Majority		600	34.2	+9.1
Turnout		1756	46.9	−15.2
Labour hold		Swing		

Linhouse
Party	Candidate	Votes	%	±%
Labour	David McGrouther*	749	40.5	−0.8
SNP	Frank Lynch	613	33.2	−4.0
Conservative	John Gordon	269	14.5	+3.4
Liberal Democrats	Elizabeth Robertson	218	11.8	+1.4
Majority		136	7.3	+3.2
Turnout		1849	67.4	+7.9
Labour hold		Swing		

Middleton
Party	Candidate	Votes	%	±%
Labour	Graeme Morrice*	924	56.8	−8.4
SNP	Geoff Hinton	445	27.4	−7.4
Conservative	Dawn Hamilton	158	9.7	N/A
Scottish Socialist	Amanda Millar	99	6.1	N/A
Majority		479	29.4	−1.0
Turnout		1626	50.5	−4.4
Labour hold		Swing		

Murieston
Party	Candidate	Votes	%	±%
Labour	Lawrence Fitzpatrick*	1,249	56.9	+12.2
Liberal Democrats	Zoe Harle	506	23.0	+9.2
SNP	John Muir	279	12.7	−14.6
Conservative	Ian Buchanan	162	7.4	−6.2
Majority		743	33.9	+15.5
Turnout		2196	64.5	−2.0
Labour hold		Swing		

Newland
Party	Candidate	Votes	%	±%
SNP	James Walker	832	45.9	−0.3
Labour	Allister Mackie*	707	39.0	−7.3
Scottish Socialist	Alistair Hendry	95	5.2	N/A
Conservative	Alistair Lowrie	93	5.1	−2.4
Liberal Democrats	Sheila Corser	86	4.7	N/A
Majority		125	6.9	+6.7
Turnout		1813	56.3	−7.0
SNP gain from Labour		Swing		

Oatridge
Party	Candidate	Votes	%	±%
SNP	Eddie Malcolm*	867	46.0	−8.0
Labour	Ena Murray	624	33.1	+4.9
Conservative	Jack Thompson	166	8.8	−0.6
Liberal Democrats	Evan Bell	133	7.1	−1.3
Scottish Socialist	Steven Nimmo	94	5.0	N/A
Majority		243	12.9	−13.0
Turnout		1884	49.3	−13.5
SNP hold		Swing		

Polkemmet
Party	Candidate	Votes	%	±%
Labour	Bert Gamble*	888	57.3	+1.8
SNP	David McKay	462	29.8	−9.8
Scottish Socialist	Mary Kalugerovich	81	5.2	N/A
Conservative	Mairi McPhee	72	4.6	−0.4
Liberal Democrats	James Chapman	46	3.0	N/A
Majority		426	27.5	+11.6
Turnout		1549	42.5	−15.1
Labour hold		Swing		

Preston
Party	Candidate	Votes	%	±%
SNP	Martyn Day*	1,242	47.0	+13.3
Liberal Democrats	Patricia Chapman	791	29.9	−3.2
Labour	John Barton	317	12.0	−7.4
Conservative	Lindsay Butchart	295	11.2	−2.6
Majority		451	17.1	+16.4
Turnout		2645	60.7	−10.0
SNP hold		Swing		

St Michael's
Party	Candidate	Votes	%	±%
SNP	Tam Smith*	890	42.7	−4.1
Labour	Thomas Conn	489	23.4	−1.6
Liberal Democrats	Charles Smith	321	15.4	+2.7
Conservative	Alexander Pagan	314	15.1	−0.4
Scottish Socialist	Edward Cornock	72	3.5	N/A
Majority		401	19.3	−2.5
Turnout		2086	56.9	−8.7
SNP hold		Swing		

Strathbrock
Party	Candidate	Votes	%	±%
Labour	Catherine Muldoon*	902	46.1	+1.9
SNP	Lynne Lewis	628	32.1	−8.1
Independent	David Gibney	246	12.6	N/A
Conservative	Michael Veitch	182	9.3	−6.2
Majority		274	14.0	+10.0
Turnout		1958	53.4	−6.7
Labour hold		Swing		
