= 2003 Angus Council election =

2003 Scottish local government election

Map showing results by ward.

Elections to Angus Council were held on 1 May 2003, the same day as the other Scottish local government elections.

== Election results ==
Angus local election result 2003
Party	Seats	Gains	Losses	Net gain/loss	Seats %	Votes %	Votes	+/−
SNP	17		4			40.4	16,984	
Independent	6	3				18.9	7,923	
Liberal Democrats	3	1				13.8	5,783	
Conservative	2					12.3	5,173	
Labour	1					14.6	6,136	

== Ward results ==
Kirriemuir West
Party	Candidate	Votes	%	±%
Conservative	I. Mackintosh	1,057	56.3	
SNP	D. Robertson	590	31.4	
Liberal Democrats	C. Campbell	118	6.3	
Labour	M. L. Smith	113	6.0	
Majority		467		
Turnout			56.9	
Conservative hold		Swing		

Kirriemuir East
Party	Candidate	Votes	%	±%
SNP	J. Henderson	656	43.9	
Conservative	R. J. W. Proctor	596	39.9	
Labour	Ms. W. N. G. Lyon	136	9.1	
Liberal Democrats	W. G. Watson	106	7.1	
Majority		60		
Turnout			50.9	
SNP hold		Swing		

Brechin West
Party	Candidate	Votes	%	±%
Independent	Ms. R. J. Leslie-Melville	896	55.0	
SNP	C. R. B. Fotheringham	520	31.9	
Labour	Ms. E. M. Smith	137	8.4	
Liberal Democrats	T. S. Simpson	75	4.6	
Majority		376		
Turnout			51.8	
Independent hold		Swing		

Brechin North Esk
Party	Candidate	Votes	%	±%
Independent	B. Myles	849	55.2	
SNP	C. Harper	500	32.5	
Labour	Ms. C. B. Short	117	7.6	
Liberal Democrats	J. G. Horrocks	72	4.7	
Majority		349		
Turnout			51.0	
Independent hold		Swing		

Westfield and Dean
Party	Candidate	Votes	%	±%
SNP	I. A. Gaul	682	42.4	
Conservative	A. J. Rymer	584	36.3	
Labour	M. A. J. Cameron	188	11.7	
Liberal Democrats	Ms. L. M. Casebow	155	9.6	
Majority		98		
Turnout			52.1	
SNP hold		Swing		

Forfar West
Party	Candidate	Votes	%	±%
SNP	Ms. G. H. Middleton	600	42.1	
Conservative	A. McM. Douglas	311	21.8	
Independent	E. P. Fenwick	277	19.4	
Labour	R. W. Milne	159	11.2	
Liberal Democrats	M. Jones	79	5.5	
Majority		289		
Turnout			50.0	
SNP hold		Swing		

Forfar Central
Party	Candidate	Votes	%	±%
SNP	R. J. Scrimgeour	577	41.0	
Liberal Democrats	Ms. A. M. A. Simpson	469	33.4	
Conservative	J. E. Treffry	240	17.1	
Labour	Ms. S. Ryan	120	8.5	
Majority		108		
Turnout			48.4	
SNP hold		Swing		

Forfar East
Party	Candidate	Votes	%	±%
SNP	W. Middleton	505	40.1	
Independent	G. McFarlane	377	30.0	
Liberal Democrats	Ms. H. C. Fleming	241	19.2	
Labour	A. H. Hunter	135	10.7	
Majority		128		
Turnout			47.1	
SNP hold		Swing		

Brechin South Esk
Party	Candidate	Votes	%	±%
SNP	Ms. J. M. Mowatt	469	40.9	
Independent	J. Milne	446	38.9	
Labour	Ms. M. E. Smith	169	14.7	
Liberal Democrats	Ms. C. A. Horrocks	62	5.4	
Majority		23		
Turnout			48.5	
SNP hold		Swing		

Montrose Ferryden
Party	Candidate	Votes	%	±%
Independent	M. S. Salmond	654	51.3	
SNP	S. West	396	31.0	
Labour	I. MacDonald	138	10.8	
Liberal Democrats	A. W. Warren	88	6.9	
Majority		258		
Turnout			45.9	
Independent gain from SNP		Swing		

Montrose Central
Party	Candidate	Votes	%	±%
Independent	T. Wood	486	39.2	
SNP	W. G. Crowe	401	32.3	
Labour	J. Sinclair	195	15.7	
Liberal Democrats	Ms. F. E. Ross	158	12.7	
Majority		85		
Turnout			44.2	
Independent gain from SNP		Swing		

Montrose West
Party	Candidate	Votes	%	±%
Independent	G. Norrie	908	64.2	
SNP	J. Dorward	293	20.7	
Labour	M. D. Holehouse	148	10.5	+0.7
Liberal Democrats	H. O. Will	65	4.6	
Majority		615		
Turnout			46.6	
Independent hold		Swing		

Montrose Hillside
Party	Candidate	Votes	%	±%
SNP	Ms. K. M. Ritchie	559	38.8	−7.3
Independent	Ms. K. M. Stirling	519	36.0	
Labour	J. L. Stewart	259	18.0	
Liberal Democrats	C. T. Ironside	103	7.2	−1.6
Majority		40		
Turnout			48.9	
SNP hold		Swing		

Forfar South
Party	Candidate	Votes	%	±%
SNP	W. R. Roberton	627	56.7	
Liberal Democrats	I. J. V. Walker	305	8.7	+18.9
Labour	E. N. Smith	173	15.7	−3.4
Majority		322		
Turnout			47.4	
SNP hold		Swing		

Letham and Friockheim
Party	Candidate	Votes	%	±%
Conservative	D. Lumgair	966	41.4	+14.7
SNP	T. L. Harvey	456	26.5	−8.0
Liberal Democrats	Ms. A. S. Vann	153	8.9	−3.3
Labour	R. Ross	146	8.5	−3.4
Majority		510		
Turnout			55.3	
Conservative hold		Swing		

Sidlaw West
Party	Candidate	Votes	%	±%
SNP	F. Ellis	1,058	54.9	
Conservative	F. Millar	389	20.2	
Labour	R. S. Bannerman	289	15.0	
Liberal Democrats	Ms. J. Wallace	192	10.0	
Majority		669		
Turnout			56.0	
SNP hold		Swing		

Sidlaw East & Ashludie
Party	Candidate	Votes	%	±%
SNP	Ms. H. Oswald	1,017	59.3	+0.9
Conservative	J. H. F. Simson	320	18.6	−8.7
Labour	Ms. F. Madden	220	12.8	−1.5
Majority		697		
Turnout			51.4	
SNP hold		Swing		

Monifieth West
Party	Candidate	Votes	%	±%
SNP	S. McGlynn	998	59.3	−19.3
Conservative	N. Watson	301	17.9	
Labour	R. Milne	247	14.7	−6.7
Liberal Democrats	Ms. L. H. Warren	138	8.2	
Majority		697		
Turnout			54.0	

Monifieth Central
Party	Candidate	Votes	%	±%
SNP	R. Murray	927	54.9	−6.1
Independent	J. R. Whyte	363	21.5	
Labour	P. E. Rae	234	13.9	+0.0
Liberal Democrats	Ms. M. M. McKelvie	163	9.7	
Majority		564		
Turnout			58.6	
SNP hold		Swing		

Carnoustie West
Party	Candidate	Votes	%	±%
SNP	J. C. Gibb	671	49.4	−23.8
Labour	Ms. M. Fairgrieve	300	22.1	−4.7
Independent	G. Forbes	194	14.3	
Conservative	D. Atkinson	131	9.6	
Liberal Democrats	Ms. S. M. C. Ironside	62	4.6	
Majority		371		
Turnout			46.8	
SNP hold		Swing		

Carnoustie Central
Party	Candidate	Votes	%	±%
Labour	P. A. Murphy	797	53.4	+2.7
SNP	Ms. R. Lamont	541	36.3	−13.0
Liberal Democrats	J. D. Coltart	154	10.3	
Majority		256		
Turnout			54.2	
Labour hold		Swing		

Carnoustie East
Party	Candidate	Votes	%	±%
SNP	D. Selfridge	943	59.3	
Independent	Ms. J. Beattie	252	15.9	
Labour	A. J. Stuart	243	15.3	
Liberal Democrats	F. W. Cutler	151	9.5	
Majority		691		
Turnout			56.3	
SNP hold		Swing		

Arbirlot & Hospitalfield
Party	Candidate	Votes	%	±%
Liberal Democrats	P. J. Nield	731	55.7	+19.0
SNP	G. S. Herald	401	30.6	
Labour	Ms. J. Bruce	180	13.7	−0.8
Majority		330		
Turnout			47.5	
Liberal Democrats hold		Swing		

Keptie
Party	Candidate	Votes	%	±%
Liberal Democrats	R. B. Spiers	563	37.6	
SNP	I. Mutch	391	29.8	
Labour	D. W. Savage	239	18.2	
Majority		172		
Turnout			48.1	
Liberal Democrats hold		Swing		

Arbroath North
Party	Candidate	Votes	%	±%
Liberal Democrats	Ms. J. C. Spiers	563	37.6	+12.1
SNP	A. J. Gray	517	34.5	−1.1
Independent	Ms. L. Hill	240	16.0	
Labour	Ms. C. Savage	177	11.8	−7.5
Majority		46		
Turnout			47.8	
Liberal Democrats gain from SNP		Swing		

Brothock
Party	Candidate	Votes	%	±%
SNP	I. J. Angus	505	42.9	
Independent	A. L. Wallace	315	26.7	
Labour	Ms. J. Mollison	223	18.9	−7.7
Liberal Democrats	K. T. Barthorpe	135	11.5	−10.8
Majority		190		
Turnout			42.5	
SNP hold		Swing		

Hayshead & Lunan
Party	Candidate	Votes	%	±%
Independent	R. R. Spink	482	36.0	
SNP	B. M. C. Milne	427	31.9	
Liberal Democrats	Ms. M. B. Lingane	219	16.4	
Labour	D. G. M. Wardlaw	210	15.7	
Majority		55		
Turnout			47.4	
Independent gain from SNP		Swing		

Harbour
Party	Candidate	Votes	%	±%
SNP	A. King	336	27.3	
Independent	D. Fairweather	333	27.1	
Labour	R. G. Thoms	218	17.1	
Conservative	P. Davies	135	11.0	
Independent	A. W. Shand	131	10.7	
Liberal Democrats	Ms. J. E. Paterson	76	6.2	
Majority		3		
Turnout			43.4	
SNP hold		Swing		

Cliffburn
Party	Candidate	Votes	%	±%
SNP	Ms S. M. Welsh	421	38.2	
Labour	Ms. D. Milne	226	20.5	
Independent	I. Watson	201	18.3	
Conservative	D. W. Patullo	143	13.0	
Liberal Democrats	Ms. L. A. Barthorope	110	10.0	
Majority		195		
Turnout			41.9	
SNP hold		Swing		
