= 2003 Renfrewshire Council election =

Election to determine the members of the Renfrewshire Council

Results by ward.

Elections to Renfrewshire Council were held on 1 May 2003, the same day as the other Scottish local government elections and the Scottish Parliament general election. The election was the last one using the 40 single-member wards using the plurality (first past the post) system of election.

Labour retained their dominance of the council, with the SNP, who won the popular vote, forming the second largest party on the council.

== Election results ==
Renfrewshire local election result 2003
Party	Seats	Gains	Losses	Net gain/loss	Seats %	Votes %	Votes	+/−
Labour	21					36.8	24,536	
SNP	15					39.3	26,167	
Liberal Democrats	3					9.7	6,457	
Conservative	1					8.9	5,900	
Scottish Socialist	0				0.0	4.7	3,141	
Independent	0				0.0	0.6	421	

== Results by Ward (A-Z) ==
An asterisk (*) indicates an incumbent candidate.

Two asterisks (**) indicates an incumbent candidate seeking re-election in a different ward.

Arkleston & Newmains
Party	Candidate	Votes	%	±%
Labour	Robert McGerty*	765	44.2	−11.9
SNP	Catherine McEwan	751	43.4	−0.5
Scottish Socialist	Douglas Canning	119	6.9	N/A
Liberal Democrats	Peter Welsh	95	5.5	N/A
Majority		14	0.8	−11.4
Turnout		1730	51.1	−11.2
Labour hold		Swing		

Bishopton
Party	Candidate	Votes	%	±%
Conservative	Iain Langlands	1,093	49.0	−10.1
SNP	Bill Robertson	628	28.1	+10.6
Labour	Anne Donnachie	511	22.9	−0.5
Majority		465	20.9	−14.8
Turnout		2232	62.7	−12.9
Conservative hold		Swing		

Blackhall & Hawkhead
Party	Candidate	Votes	%	±%
SNP	Celia Lawson*	902	59.0	+19.2
Labour	Victoria Bain	473	30.9	+8.4
Scottish Socialist	Robert Muir	155	10.1	N/A
Majority		429	28.1	+15.9
Turnout		1530	42.9	−14.2
SNP hold		Swing		

Blythswood
Party	Candidate	Votes	%	±%
SNP	Derek MacKay*	952	64.2	+16.9
Labour	Roy Hutchison	405	27.3	−16.1
Scottish Socialist	James Halfpenny	67	4.5	N/A
Conservative	Margaret McLellan	58	3.9	−1.9
Majority		547	36.9	+33.0
Turnout		1482	45.1	−12.1
SNP hold		Swing		

Brediland
Party	Candidate	Votes	%	±%
Labour	John McDowell*	590	46.0	−9.5
SNP	Archibald Ashcroft	371	28.9	+0.4
Liberal Democrats	Mark Hollywood	189	14.7	−1.3
Scottish Socialist	Billy McNaughton	84	6.5	N/A
Conservative	Ian Dryburgh	50	3.9	N/A
Majority		219	17.1	−9.9
Turnout		1284	40.9	−9.2
Labour hold		Swing		

Bridge of Weir North & Craigends
Party	Candidate	Votes	%	±%
SNP	Allan Noon*	798	43.1	+10.4
Labour	John McDonald	615	33.2	+2.1
Conservative	John Motherwell	438	23.7	−0.7
Majority		183	9.9	+8.3
Turnout		1851	47.6	−13.9
SNP hold		Swing		

Bridge of Weir South & Brookfield
Party	Candidate	Votes	%	±%
SNP	Carol Puthucheary*	1,242	63.9	+24.7
Conservative	Thomas Begg	431	22.2	−14.0
Labour	Mary Galbraith	272	14.0	−10.6
Majority		811	41.7	+38.7
Turnout		1945	56.0	−12.1
SNP hold		Swing		

Castlehead
Party	Candidate	Votes	%	±%
SNP	James Mitchell*	982	54.3	+15.6
Labour	David Lavery	478	26.4	−7.8
Conservative	Allison Cook	239	13.2	−6.0
Liberal Democrats	Margaret McDonough	110	6.1	−1.8
Majority		504	27.9	+23.4
Turnout		1809	49.3	−9.9
SNP hold		Swing		

Deanside
Party	Candidate	Votes	%	±%
Labour	Alexander Murrin*	751	43.5	+1.4
SNP	William Perrie	746	43.2	+5.7
Conservative	Ronald Kane	128	7.4	+0.2
Liberal Democrats	Brian O'Malley	101	5.9	N/A
Majority		5	0.3	−4.3
Turnout		1726	49.6	−10.3
Labour hold		Swing		

Elderslie
Party	Candidate	Votes	%	±%
Labour	Jean Goldie*	1,060	58.9	+6.2
SNP	Rubina Kerr	406	22.6	−5.5
Conservative	Elizabeth Speirs	184	10.2	+0.3
Liberal Democrats	Sara Craig	150	8.3	−1.0
Majority		654	36.3	+11.7
Turnout		1800	49.5	−11.1
Labour hold		Swing		

Erskine Central
Party	Candidate	Votes	%	±%
Labour	James Harte	781	43.9	−6.5
SNP	James McQuade	630	35.4	−3.9
Conservative	Stewart Campbell	143	8.0	−2.3
Liberal Democrats	Lindsay Cunningham	120	6.7	N/A
Scottish Socialist	Brian Murphy	106	6.0	N/A
Majority		151	8.5	−2.7
Turnout		1780	50.0	−12.6
Labour hold		Swing		

Erskine South East & Inchinnan
Party	Candidate	Votes	%	±%
SNP	Iain Nicolson*	998	44.9	−5.6
Labour	John Ross	680	30.6	−3.4
Conservative	Philip Lardner	437	19.7	+4.2
Liberal Democrats	Anne Hanley	106	4.8	N/A
Majority		318	14.3	−2.1
Turnout		2221	62.5	−1.8
SNP hold		Swing		

Erskine West
Party	Candidate	Votes	%	±%
Labour	Robert McNally*	820	44.5	−8.6
SNP	Andrew Paterson	620	33.7	+2.6
Conservative	John Anderson	286	15.5	−0.2
Scottish Socialist	David Fraser	116	6.3	N/A
Majority		200	10.8	−11.2
Turnout		1842	53.4	−12.2
Labour hold		Swing		

Ferguslie
Party	Candidate	Votes	%	±%
Labour	Terence Kelly*	407	47.5	+1.6
SNP	Andrew Doyle	384	44.8	+13.2
Liberal Democrats	Anne Bradley	66	7.7	+1.9
Majority		23	2.7	−11.8
Turnout		857	28.8	−12.9
Labour hold		Swing		

Foxbar
Party	Candidate	Votes	%	±%
SNP	Lorraine Cameron*	923	57.9	+11.6
Labour	Christopher Gilmour	539	33.8	−8.3
Liberal Democrats	John Boyd	131	8.2	−3.4
Majority		384	24.1	+19.9
Turnout		1593	45.1	−8.8
SNP hold		Swing		

Gallowhill & Whitehaugh
Party	Candidate	Votes	%	±%
SNP	Brian Lawson*	1,128	53.3	+5.2
Labour	Tracy Hall	611	28.8	−1.5
Liberal Democrats	John McGurk	237	11.2	+2.9
Conservative	Sean Hurl	142	6.7	−3.2
Majority		517	24.5	+6.7
Turnout		2118	56.0	−5.7
SNP hold		Swing		

Glenburn North
Party	Candidate	Votes	%	±%
SNP	Bill Martin*	1,029	62.1	+2.4
Labour	Evelyn Campbell	360	21.7	−10.6
Liberal Democrats	James McIntosh	107	6.5	N/A
Scottish Socialist	Miriam Vashwani	83	5.0	N/A
Conservative	Terrence Speirs	77	4.6	−3.4
Majority		669	40.4	+13.0
Turnout		1656	45.8	−13.6
SNP hold		Swing		

Glenburn South
Party	Candidate	Votes	%	±%
SNP	Richard Vassie*	1,105	61.3	+3.9
Labour	Edward Devine	475	26.3	−8.7
Scottish Socialist	Jacqueline McCarthy	110	6.1	N/A
Liberal Democrats	Peter Dickman	65	3.6	−0.5
Conservative	Peter Black	49	2.7	−6.3
Majority		630	35.0	+7.6
Turnout		1804	49.2	−9.5
SNP hold		Swing		

Houston & Langbank
Party	Candidate	Votes	%	±%
SNP	Fiona Nicolson	710	42.5	−8.3
Conservative	Richard Taylor	400	24.0	−1.2
Labour	Jean McGuinness	334	20.0	−3.9
Liberal Democrats	Iain Barclay	226	13.5	N/A
Majority		310	18.5	−7.1
Turnout		1670	53.4	−14.3
SNP hold		Swing		

Johnstone Castle
Party	Candidate	Votes	%	±%
Labour	John Hood	787	51.9	−9.2
SNP	Tracie McGee	590	38.9	+8.8
Conservative	Helen Mathie	138	9.1	+0.3
Majority		197	13.0	−18.0
Turnout		1515	43.6	−11.4
Labour hold		Swing		

Johnstone Central
Party	Candidate	Votes	%	±%
Labour	John Kenny*	859	55.6	−5.5
SNP	Frances Ashcroft	333	21.6	−6.3
Scottish Socialist	Neil Lennon	167	10.8	N/A
Liberal Democrats	Rebecca Brady	94	6.1	N/A
Conservative	Ena McKean	92	6.0	−1.0
Majority		526	34.0	−3.1
Turnout		1545	44.1	−14.1
Labour hold		Swing		

Johnstone Cochranemill
Party	Candidate	Votes	%	±%
Labour	James Harkins*	973	61.4	−0.9
SNP	Stephen McGee	472	29.8	+3.2
Scottish Socialist	Paul Wilson	140	8.8	N/A
Majority		501	31.6	−4.2
Turnout		1585	43.6	−11.9
Labour hold		Swing		

Johnstone West
Party	Candidate	Votes	%	±%
Labour	Iain McMillan*	1,050	71.2	+6.1
SNP	Lyndsay Cameron	424	28.8	+3.1
Majority		626	42.4	+3.0
Turnout		1474	43.0	−17.7
Labour hold		Swing		

Kilbarchan
Party	Candidate	Votes	%	±%
SNP	Ian Taylor	777	43.4	−27.7
Labour	Thomas Stevenson	546	30.5	+12.6
Conservative	John McIntyre	318	17.8	+6.8
Liberal Democrats	John Heron	149	8.3	N/A
Majority		231	12.9	−40.3
Turnout		1790	55.4	−12.7
SNP hold		Swing		

Linwood East
Party	Candidate	Votes	%	±%
Labour	Anne Hall*	1,010	60.0	−3.6
SNP	James McManus	307	18.2	−10.2
Scottish Socialist	William Coats	261	15.5	N/A
Liberal Democrats	Sandra Jelfs	106	6.3	−1.7
Majority		703	41.8	+6.5
Turnout		1684	45.9	−12.6
Labour hold		Swing		

Linwood West
Party	Candidate	Votes	%	±%
Labour	Ronald Burns*	804	53.5	−1.5
SNP	Audrey Doig	536	35.7	+0.8
Liberal Democrats	Alan Jelfs	163	10.8	+0.7
Majority		268	17.8	−2.3
Turnout		1503	40.3	−13.8
Labour hold		Swing		

Lochfield
Party	Candidate	Votes	%	±%
Liberal Democrats	Marie McGurk*	859	41.3	+7.8
SNP	Caroline Martin	582	28.0	+0.4
Labour	Ian McCormack	438	21.0	−9.5
Conservative	Ann Moohan	124	6.0	−2.4
Scottish Socialist	Henry Pfaff	79	3.8	N/A
Majority		372	13.3	+10.3
Turnout		2082	59.4	+0.3
Liberal Democrats hold		Swing		

Lochwinnoch & Howwood
Party	Candidate	Votes	%	±%
SNP	Alastair Nimmo*	1,230	53.1	+7.6
Labour	Sandra McCall	648	28.0	−6.3
Conservative	George McEwan	314	13.6	−1.8
Scottish Socialist	Michael Daly	123	5.3	N/A
Majority		582	25.1	+13.9
Turnout		2315	59.0	−9.4
SNP hold		Swing		

Lounsdale & Millarston
Party	Candidate	Votes	%	±%
Labour	Mark MacMillan*	638	39.8	−4.8
SNP	David McCartney	533	33.2	+0.1
Liberal Democrats	Allan Heron	189	11.8	−1.8
Conservative	George Baillie	135	8.4	−0.2
Scottish Socialist	Daniel Williamson	109	6.8	N/A
Majority		105	7.6	−3.9
Turnout		1604	52.9	−3.4
Labour hold		Swing		

Moorpark
Party	Candidate	Votes	%	±%
SNP	David Mylet*	729	51.3	+8.7
Labour	Donnie Smith	587	41.3	+0.3
Scottish Socialist	Derek Flood	105	7.4	N/A
Majority		142	10.0	+8.4
Turnout		1421	48.6	−11.1
SNP hold		Swing		

Paisley Central
Party	Candidate	Votes	%	±%
Labour	Barbara Adams*	517	43.6	−4.0
SNP	Michael Loftus	363	30.6	−8.9
Scottish Socialist	Gerard McCartney	167	14.1	N/A
Liberal Democrats	Alan Armstrong	103	8.7	+0.1
Conservative	Adele Gardiner	37	3.1	−1.3
Majority		154	13.0	+4.9
Turnout		1187	35.7	−11.2
Labour hold		Swing		

Parkmains
Party	Candidate	Votes	%	±%
Labour	Sam Mullin	954	53.4	+3.2
SNP	John Canavan	421	23.6	−9.0
Scottish Socialist	Fiona Lawson	159	8.9	N/A
Conservative	Oonagh Harper	145	8.1	−9.1
Liberal Democrats	Valerie McGuire	108	6.0	N/A
Majority		533	29.8	+12.2
Turnout		1787	52.1	−8.0
Labour hold		Swing		

Ralston
Party	Candidate	Votes	%	±%
Liberal Democrats	Nan MacGregor*	1,600	67.6	+3.4
SNP	Alasdair Russell	302	12.8	+2.9
Labour	Ann Henderson	290	12.3	−3.4
Conservative	Stewart Connell	174	7.4	−2.8
Majority		1298	54.8	+6.2
Turnout		2366	62.4	−9.6
Liberal Democrats hold		Swing		

Sandyford
Party	Candidate	Votes	%	±%
Labour	Richard Manser*	732	55.5	−10.1
SNP	Thomas Dyer	586	44.5	+10.1
Majority		146	11.0	−20.2
Turnout		1318	41.0	−13.5
Labour hold		Swing		

Saucel & Hunterhill
Party	Candidate	Votes	%	±%
Labour	Roy Glen*	484	32.3	−24.6
Independent	Paul Mack	421	28.1	N/A
SNP	John Connell	394	26.3	−16.8
Liberal Democrats	Henry Bradley	81	5.4	N/A
Scottish Socialist	Fiona Macdonald	77	5.1	N/A
Conservative	Heather Hamilton	41	2.7	N/A
Majority		63	4.2	−9.5
Turnout		1498	42.0	−9.5
Labour hold		Swing		

Seedhill
Party	Candidate	Votes	%	±%
Labour	Rayleen Kelly	447	37.1	−12.8
Scottish Socialist	Iain Hogg*	437	36.2	N/A
SNP	Jennifer Adam	322	26.7	−11.6
Majority		10	0.9	−10.6
Turnout		1206	37.3	−11.3
Labour hold		Swing		

Incumbent Councillor Iain Hogg had originally been elected for Labour at the 1999 council election, but sought re-election for the Scottish Socialist Party. He would ultimately lose re-election.

Shortroods
Party	Candidate	Votes	%	±%
Labour	Thomas Williams*	547	46.9	−7.6
SNP	Robert Sharkey	395	33.8	−11.7
Scottish Socialist	Ian Henderson	131	11.2	N/A
Liberal Democrats	Michael Hanley	94	8.1	N/A
Majority		152	13.1	+4.1
Turnout		1167	35.3	−11.7
Labour hold		Swing		

St James
Party	Candidate	Votes	%	±%
Labour	John Green*	493	58.1	−2.2
SNP	Kenneth MacLaren	231	27.2	−12.5
Scottish Socialist	Sean Cudden	125	14.7	N/A
Majority		262	30.9	+10.2
Turnout		849	25.8	−13.8
Labour hold		Swing		

Stanely
Party	Candidate	Votes	%	±%
Liberal Democrats	Eileen McCartin*	1,208	61.2	+2.7
SNP	Eileen Clark	263	13.3	−3.1
Labour	Paul Thomson	249	12.6	−4.6
Conservative	Sheila Fulton	176	8.9	+1.0
Scottish Socialist	Charles Collins	79	4.0	N/A
Majority		945	47.9	+6.5
Turnout		1973	54.7	−10.4
Liberal Democrats hold		Swing		

Townhead
Party	Candidate	Votes	%	±%
SNP	William McGuinness*	1,072	58.9	+6.7
Labour	Georgina Hunter	556	30.5	−4.5
Conservative	James McQueen	193	10.6	−2.2
Majority		516	18.4	+1.2
Turnout		1821	56.1	−7.6
SNP hold		Swing		
