= 2003 Perth and Kinross Council election =

2003 Scottish local government election

- 1 May 2003

All 41 seats to Perth and Kinross Council 21 seats needed for a majority
- Turnout: 54.0% ▼9.3
	First party	Second party	Third party
Party	SNP	Conservative	Liberal Democrats
Last election	16 seats	11 seats	6 seats
Seats won	15	10	9
Seat change	▼1	▼1	▲3
Popular vote	20,651	16,076	12,645
Percentage	36.1%	28.1%	22.1%
	Fourth party	Fifth party
Party	Labour	Independent
Last election	6 seats	2 seats
Seats won	5	2
Seat change	▼1	Steady
Popular vote	5,567	2,236
Percentage	9.7%	3.9%

The 2003 Perth and Kinross Council election was held on 1 May 2003, the same day as other Scottish Local Government elections and the Scottish Parliament Election.

This was the last election using 41 single member wards, in which the Scottish National Party won the most seats with 15.

== Results ==
2003 Perth and Kinross Council election result
Party	Seats	Gains	Losses	Net gain/loss	Seats %	Votes %	Votes	+/−
SNP	15	1	2	▼1	36.6	36.1	20,651	
Conservative	10	1	2	▼1	24.4	28.1	16,076	
Liberal Democrats	9	3	0	▲3	22.0	22.1	12,645	
Labour	5	0	1	▼1	12.2	9.7	5,567	
Independent	2	0	0	Steady	4.9	3.9	2,236	

== Ward results ==
Ward 1 Rannoch & Atholl
Party	Candidate	Votes	%	±%
SNP	J Culliven	516	61.1	+17.4
Conservative	Ms. C Morrison	231	27.4	−0.6
Liberal Democrats	R D McArthur	97	11.5	+3.3
Majority		285	33.7	+18
Turnout		844	60.7	+7.1
SNP hold		Swing		

Ward 2 Pitlochry
Party	Candidate	Votes	%	±%
SNP	Ms. E J Howie	731	48.0	−5.1
Independent	Ms.K Scott	484	31.8	+31.8
Conservative	P Edward	230	15.1	−13.7
Liberal Democrats	J F A Rankin	79	5.2	−1.8
Majority		247	16.2	−8.1
Turnout		1,524	61.9	−9.0
SNP hold		Swing		

Ward 3 Rattray & Glenshee
Party	Candidate	Votes	%	±%
SNP	Ms. E A Grant	572	50.2	−3.9
Conservative	R M E Taylor	304	22.7	−8.6
Independent	Ms. S M Thorne	200	14.9	+14.9
Labour	Ms. K Barrett	114	8.5	−6.1
Liberal Democrats	Ms. A Wilson	48	3.6	+3.6
Majority		368	27.5	−4.7
Turnout		1,338	51.2	−5.3
SNP hold		Swing		

Ward 4 Alyth & Old Rattray
Party	Candidate	Votes	%	±%
SNP	I Miller	1,083	64.3	+18.1
Conservative	G Suttie	491	29.2	−16.7
Liberal Democrats	J I Reid	109	6.5	+6.5
Majority		592	35.1	+34.8
Turnout		1,683	60.6	−9.0
Liberal Democrats hold		Swing		

Ward 5 Coupar Angus & Meigle
Party	Candidate	Votes	%	±%
SNP	A D Grant	801	56.0	+7.6
Conservative	L R Bushby	443	31.0	+1.4
Liberal Democrats	Ms. J Rennie	187	13.1	+13.1
Majority		358	25.0	15.3
Turnout		1,431	53.9	−14.7
SNP hold		Swing		

Ward 6 Rosemount
Party	Candidate	Votes	%	±%
Conservative	Ms. S H Bushby	821	53.6	+8.0
SNP	Ms. C C J Wilson	605	39.5	+3.6
Liberal Democrats	P G Gill	105	6.9	+0.2
Majority		216	14.1	+4.4
Turnout		1,531	61.5	−7.1
Conservative hold		Swing		

Ward 7 Blairgowrie
Party	Candidate	Votes	%	±%
SNP	R S Ellis	774	63.7	+8.4
Conservative	Ms. J D Bruce	361	29.7	+3.8
Liberal Democrats	Ms. P Carruthers	81	6.7	−2.2
Majority		413	34	+4.6
Turnout		1,216	53.1	−8.3
SNP hold		Swing		

Ward 8 Kinclaven & Clunie
Party	Candidate	Votes	%	±%
SNP	A Telfer	628	41.8	+8.2
Conservative	Ms B Vaughan	487	32.4	−0.7
Liberal Democrats	J Stewart	389	25.9	+2.7
Majority		141	9.4	+8.9
Turnout		1,504	58.0	−5.2
SNP hold		Swing		

Ward 9 Strathtay & Dunkeld
Party	Candidate	Votes	%	±%
SNP	A S Barr	750	48.6	+13.2
Conservative	Ms S G Mannion	600	38.9	+4.2
Liberal Democrats	W E Freeman	193	12.5	−7.1
Majority		150	9.7	+9
Turnout		1,543	61.0	−7.2
SNP hold		Swing		

Ward 10 Breadalbane
Party	Candidate	Votes	%	±%
SNP	K I Lyall	864	60.3	+21.8
Conservative	J M Harding	411	28.7	+10.0
Liberal Democrats	E W Drysdale	157	11.0	+6.7
Majority		453	31.6	+21.3
Turnout		1,432	57.3	−11.0
SNP hold		Swing		

Ward 11 Comrie
Party	Candidate	Votes	%	±%
Conservative	C Crabbie	734	51.9	−4.3
SNP	A Dillon	497	35.1	+7.2
Liberal Democrats	Ms D J Guyan	183	12.9	−2.9
Majority		237	16.8	−11.5
Turnout		1,414	61.9	−6.9
Conservative hold		Swing		

Ward 12 Crieff North
Party	Candidate	Votes	%	±%
Conservative	Ms. H McDonald	781	55.2	+3.7
SNP	Ms.M Kelly	374	26.4	+6.3
Liberal Democrats	D E Dewar	260	18.4	+2.6
Majority		317	28.8	+10.0
Turnout		1,415	52.0	−7.8
Conservative hold		Swing		

Ward 13 Crieff South
Party	Candidate	Votes	%	±%
Conservative	Ms A Cowan	507	38.2	+3.1
SNP	Ms C A Scally	384	28.9	−17.8
Labour	Ms M Dingwall	340	25.6	+25.6
Liberal Democrats	Ms N Valentine	97	7.3	−10.8
Majority		123	9.3	−2.3
Turnout		1,328	50.5	−5.6
Conservative gain from SNP		Swing		

Ward 14 Strathord & Logiealmond
Party	Candidate	Votes	%	±%
Liberal Democrats	R A Scott	999	60.4	+10.1
SNP	J L Kelias	380	23.0	+4.0
Conservative	G G Rees	275	16.6	−7.7
Majority		619	37.4	+11.4
Turnout		1,654	57.5	−9.1
Liberal Democrats hold		Swing		

Ward 15 Strathalmond
Party	Candidate	Votes	%	±%
SNP	R Lumsden	730	51.7	+14.9
Conservative	Ms S Nimmo	459	32.5	−3.4
Liberal Democrats	Ms C F Robertson	224	15.9	+5.4
Majority		271	19.2	+18.3
Turnout		1,413	54.7	−11.4
SNP hold		Swing		

Ward 16 Scone
Party	Candidate	Votes	%	±%
Liberal Democrats	L D D Simpson	818	49.9	+27.4
SNP	S McMillan	483	29.5	−1.3
Conservative	H D D Anderson	339	20.7	−11.5
Majority		335	20.4	+19.0
Turnout		1,640	62.4	−2.2
Liberal Democrats gain from Conservative		Swing		

Ward 17 Dunsinnan
Party	Candidate	Votes	%	±%
Independent	J E Lloyd	841	55.6	+20.6
Conservative	J Main	372	24.6	−8.0
SNP	R MacDonald	300	19.8	+0.4
Majority		469	31.0	+28.6
Turnout		1,513	60.6	−6.0
Independent hold		Swing		

Ward 18 East Carse
Party	Candidate	Votes	%	±%
SNP	P L Mulheron	994	63.4	+10.9
Conservative	R W Last	331	21.1	−4.6
Liberal Democrats	K M Reay	244	15.6	+7.8
Majority		663	42.3	+16.7
Turnout		1,569	55.8	−11.6
SNP hold		Swing		

Ward 19 Central Carse
Party	Candidate	Votes	%	±%
SNP	J K M Hulbert	638	47.8	+1.7
Conservative	M Roberts	496	37.2	−3.1
Liberal Democrats	M Reay	201	15.1	+1.5
Majority		142	10.6	+4.8
Turnout		1,335	56.0	−8.3
SNP hold		Swing		

Ward 20 Barnhill & West Carse
Party	Candidate	Votes	%	±%
Liberal Democrats	P A Barrett	724	43.9	+22.5
Conservative	Ms H Stewart	651	39.5	−10.4
SNP	Ms S E Morrison	273	16.6	−12.1
Majority		73	4.4	−16.8
Turnout		1,847	60.8	−7.4
Liberal Democrats gain from Conservative		Swing		

Ward 21 Picstonhill
Party	Candidate	Votes	%	±%
Independent	J Doig	396	28.4	−5.9
Conservative	Ms A Rees	392	28.1	+5.0
SNP	Ms R L McEwan	369	26.5	+6.1
Labour	Ms A A Chatt	236	17.1	−5.1
Independent hold		Swing		

Ward 22 North Inch
Party	Candidate	Votes	%	±%
Labour	Ms J H E McEwen	353	38.7	+2.7
SNP	R Band	270	29.6	−1.2
Conservative	R Bywalec	203	22.3	−0.7
Liberal Democrats	Ms C V Whittingham	86	9.4	−0.7
Labour hold		Swing		

Ward 23 Muirton
Party	Candidate	Votes	%	±%
SNP	G Hunter	393	48.6	+11.4
Labour	Ms A Howard	189	23.4	−9.6
Conservative	D Gratty	145	17.9	−2.7
Liberal Democrats	N S Gellatly	82	10.1	+10.1
Majority		204	25.2	+21.0
Turnout		809	39.3	−6.1
SNP hold		Swing		

Ward 24 North Muirton
Party	Candidate	Votes	%	±%
Labour	A A MacLellan	477	43.8	+13.1
SNP	A Grant	447	41.0	+8.8
Conservative	Ms C Hastings	99	9.1	+1.3
Liberal Democrats	M J Whittingham	66	6.1	+3.0
Majority		30	2.8	−21.9
Turnout		1,089	42.8	−14.1
Labour hold		Swing		

Ward 25 Hillyland
Party	Candidate	Votes	%	±%
SNP	D M Scott	630	56.5	
Labour	J Kane	313	28.1	
Conservative	R Dewar	111	10.0	−3.4
Liberal Democrats	Ms E C Barrett	61	5.5	+5.5
Majority		317	28.4	−3.9
Turnout		1,115	40.6	−13.7
SNP hold		Swing		

Ward 26 Ruthven Park
Party	Candidate	Votes	%	±%
Liberal Democrats	A Livingstone	714	51.4	+16.3
Conservative	Ms Y Clark	284	20.5	−4.4
SNP	Ms E Angus	239	17.2	−2.4
Labour	A Gilruth	151	10.9	−8.7
Majority		430	30.9	−20.7
Turnout		1,388	55.5	−9.1
Liberal Democrats hold		Swing		

Ward 27 North Letham
Party	Candidate	Votes	%	±%
Labour	J McM Flynn	651	57.4	+0.6
SNP	J Lumsden	339	29.9	−1.9
Conservative	Ms P Roberts	84	7.4	−0.1
Liberal Democrats	Ms L Freeman	61	5.4	+1.4
Majority		312	27.5	+2.5
Turnout		1,135	47.4	−10.1
Labour hold		Swing		

Ward 28 South Letham
Party	Candidate	Votes	%	±%
Labour	C Gillies	574	51.1	+3.8
SNP	Ms E C MacLachlan	401	35.7	−3.2
Conservative	R Fraser	101	9.0	−0.3
Liberal Democrats	W Matheson	48	4.3	−0.2
Majority		173	15.4	+7.0
Turnout		1,124	40.5	−11.2
Labour hold		Swing		

Ward 29 Wellshill
Party	Candidate	Votes	%	±%
Conservative	A Stewart	539	42.5	+16.6
SNP	A J Cook	356	28.1	+3.0
Labour	Ms L M Ferguson	187	14.7	9.4
Liberal Democrats	A J Syme	186	14.7	−10.4
Majority		183	14.4	+13.6
Turnout		1,268	48.9	−9.6
Conservative hold		Swing		

Ward 30 Oakbank
Party	Candidate	Votes	%	±%
Liberal Democrats	W O Wilson	1,281	79.4	+9.0
Conservative	J McNicol	184	11.4	−0.4
SNP	T Karczewski	149	9.2	+0.2
Majority		1,097	68.0	+8.2
Turnout		1,614	63.3	−10.8
Liberal Democrats hold		Swing		

Ward 31 Craigie
Party	Candidate	Votes	%	±%
Liberal Democrats	L Caddell	550	33.8	+1.6
SNP	A M Gadsden	399	24.5	+2.4
Conservative	J Blackie	373	22.9	−1.6
Labour	J McCann	304	18.7	−2.4
Majority		151	9.3	+1.6
Turnout		1,626	58.5	−10.4
Liberal Democrats hold		Swing		

Ward 32 South Inch
Party	Candidate	Votes	%	±%
SNP	J Coburn	449	40.8	+7.7
Labour	J Forbes	306	27.8	−12.3
Conservative	Ms S Stewart	219	19.9	+1.0
Liberal Democrats	Ms M S Matheson	126	11.5	+3.6
Majority		143	13.0	+6.0
Turnout		1,100	42.2	−7.8
SNP gain from Labour		Swing		

Ward 33 Moncrieffe & Friarton
Party	Candidate	Votes	%	±%
Labour	M H Lennie	516	41.9	−0.7
SNP	Ms E J S Lee	383	31.1	+1.0
Conservative	M Archibald	220	17.9	−1.0
Liberal Democrats	J A Simpson	112	9.1	−0.4
Majority		133	10.8	−1.7
Turnout		1,231	47.6	−13.7
Labour hold		Swing		

Ward 34 Earn
Party	Candidate	Votes	%	±%
Conservative	A Jack	638	41.4	+9.2
Liberal Democrats	K R Spittal	433	28.1	−1.1
SNP	E G Dow	279	18.1	−7.7
Labour	P C Noad	192	12.5	−0.3
Majority		205	13.3	+10.3
Turnout		1,542	58.6	−10.1
Conservative hold		Swing		

Ward 35 Auchterarder Mid Earn
Party	Candidate	Votes	%	±%
Conservative	J Mair	675	45.4	+2.0
SNP	Ms S R M Russell	328	22.0	−4.0
Independent	Ms K Fyffe	315	21.2	+21.2
Liberal Democrats	J B Pringle	170	11.4	+2.6
Majority		347	23.4	−6.9
Turnout		1,488	54.6	−8.6
Conservative hold		Swing		

Ward 36 Strathallan & Glendevon
Party	Candidate	Votes	%	±%
Conservative	D Dow	686	43.6	−0.8
SNP	Ms C A Younger	486	30.9	−2.5
Liberal Democrats	Ms A G Gaunt	403	25.6	+2.4
Majority		200	12.7	+1.7
Turnout		1,575	53.6	−9.5
Conservative hold		Swing		

Ward 37 Auchterarder Craig Rosse
Party	Candidate	Votes	%	±%
Conservative	C Young	582	39.0	+4.8
SNP	K R A Robertson	527	35.3	+1.2
Labour	B Kift	225	15.1	−7.2
Liberal Democrats	W Rennie	158	10.6	+1.2
Majority		55	3.7	+3.6
Turnout		1,492	53.7	−7.5
Conservative hold		Swing		

Ward 38 Abernethy & Glenfarg
Party	Candidate	Votes	%	±%
Conservative	Ms K Baird	695	51.5	+4.8
Liberal Democrats	D Skene	330	24.4	+8.1
SNP	W M Armstrong	325	24.1	−12.9
Majority		365	27.1	+17.4
Turnout		1,350	57.9	−8.8
Conservative hold		Swing		

Ward 39 Milnathort & North Kinross
Party	Candidate	Votes	%	±%
Liberal Democrats	W B Robertson	923	56.2	+2.4
SNP	A Bath	329	20.0	−4.0
Conservative	Ms V Y Parkin	215	13.1	+2.0
Labour	Ms C D Milliken	176	10.7	−0.4
Majority		594	36.2	+26.5
Turnout		1,643	54.3	−15.0
Liberal Democrats hold		Swing		

Ward 40 Kinross Town
Party	Candidate	Votes	%	±%
Liberal Democrats	G G Hayton	581	47.0	+37.0
SNP	S Miller	372	30.1	−34.2
Labour	Ms M P B Lockhart	153	12.4	−0.3
Conservative	T Paterson	129	10.4	−2.6
Majority		209	16.9	+34.4
Turnout		1,235	51.6	−17.4
Liberal Democrats gain from SNP		Swing		

Ward 41 Kinross-shire
Party	Candidate	Votes	%	±%
Liberal Democrats	M A Barnacle	945	54.1	+14.9
SNP	T McHendry	384	22.0	−3.5
Conservative	M F Parkin	310	17.7	−4.0
Labour	M C M Twaddle	108	6.2	−7.4
Majority		561	32.1	+18.4
Turnout		1,747	57.3	−9.8
Liberal Democrats hold		Swing		
