= 2003 North Lanarkshire Council election =

2003 Scottish local government election

Map showing results by ward.

Elections to North Lanarkshire Council were held on 1 May 2003, the same day as the other Scottish local government elections and the Scottish Parliament general election.

== Election results ==
North Lanarkshire local election result 2003
| Party | Seats | Gains | Losses | Net gain/loss | Seats % | Votes % | Votes | +/− |
|---|---|---|---|---|---|---|---|---|
| Labour | 54 | 0 | 2 | -2 | 77.1 | 55.2 | 61,719 | +0.5 |
| SNP | 13 | 1 | 0 | +1 | 18.6 | 32.6 | 36,439 | -3.4 |
| Conservative | 0 | 0 | 0 | 0 | 0.0 | 3.9 | 4,359 | -0.5 |
| Scottish Socialist | 0 | 0 | 0 | 0 | 0.0 | 2.5 | 2,850 | +2.1 |
| Liberal Democrats | 0 | 0 | 0 | 0 | 0.0 | 1.1 | 1,259 | -0.7 |
| Liberty Party | 0 | 0 | 0 | 0 | 0.0 | 0.1 | 131 | New |
| Independent | 3 | 1 | 0 | +1 | 4.3 | 4.6 | 5,090 | +1.9 |

Total number of valid votes cast: 111,847.

== Ward results ==
Ladywell
| Party | Candidate | Votes | % | ±% |
|---|---|---|---|---|
| Labour Co-op | Michael Ross | 1,002 | 47.1 | +9.5 |
| Conservative | Robert Burgess | 536 | 25.2 | −3.7 |
| SNP | George Pickering | 432 | 20.3 | −13.2 |
| Scottish Socialist | Gregor MacEwan | 157 | 7.4 | N/A |
| Majority | | 466 | 21.9 | +17.8 |
| Turnout | | 2,137 | 55.3 | −9.3 |
| Labour Co-op hold | | Swing | +6.6 | |

Calder Valley
| Party | Candidate | Votes | % | ±% |
|---|---|---|---|---|
| Labour | Annita McAuley | 898 | 59.5 | +1.2 |
| SNP | Dallas Carter | 448 | 29.7 | −1.0 |
| Conservative | William Millar | 164 | 10.9 | −0.1 |
| Majority | | 450 | 29.8 | +2.2 |
| Turnout | | 1,527 | 44.7 | −14.1 |
| Labour hold | | Swing | +1.1 | |

Forgewood
| Party | Candidate | Votes | % | ±% |
|---|---|---|---|---|
| Labour | Patrick Connelly | 683 | 58.8 | +8.5 |
| SNP | Mark Wilson | 343 | 29.5 | −11.8 |
| Conservative | Archie Giggie | 135 | 11.6 | +3.1 |
| Majority | | 340 | 29.3 | +20.3 |
| Turnout | | 1,161 | 36.5 | −14.1 |
| Labour hold | | Swing | +10.2 | |

North Motherwell
| Party | Candidate | Votes | % | ±% |
|---|---|---|---|---|
| Labour | William Martin | 1,208 | 71.4 | +13.7 |
| SNP | Wendy Moffat | 347 | 20.5 | −10.6 |
| Conservative | June Millar | 137 | 8.1 | −3.1 |
| Majority | | 861 | 50.9 | +24.3 |
| Turnout | | 1,698 | 42.8 | −13.0 |
| Labour hold | | Swing | +12.2 | |

New Stevenston and Carfin
| Party | Candidate | Votes | % | ±% |
|---|---|---|---|---|
| Labour | Helen McKenna | 1,231 | 62.2 | +8.9 |
| SNP | Ian Kinkade | 586 | 29.6 | −9.7 |
| Conservative | James McKinley | 161 | 8.1 | +0.7 |
| Majority | | 645 | 32.6 | +18.6 |
| Turnout | | 1,990 | 50.0 | |
| Labour hold | | Swing | +9.3 | |

Craigneuk
| Party | Candidate | Votes | % | ±% |
|---|---|---|---|---|
| Labour | Thomas G Lunny | 897 | 73.8 | +6.4 |
| SNP | Iain M Hart | 161 | 13.2 | −15.0 |
| Scottish Socialist | Joyce Carmichael | 158 | 13.0 | N/A |
| Majority | | 736 | 60.5 | +21.3 |
| Turnout | | 1,225 | 41.8 | −7.8 |
| Labour hold | | Swing | +10.7 | |

Belhaven
| Party | Candidate | Votes | % | ±% |
|---|---|---|---|---|
| Labour | Samuel Love | 1,075 | 56.2 | +13.2 |
| SNP | Clare Adamson | 622 | 32.5 | −9.0 |
| Conservative | Christina Giggie | 216 | 11.3 | −4.2 |
| Majority | | 453 | 23.7 | +22.2 |
| Turnout | | 1,930 | 54.1 | −3.3 |
| Labour hold | | Swing | +11.1 | |

Stewarton
| Party | Candidate | Votes | % | ±% |
|---|---|---|---|---|
| Labour | John Moran | 1,024 | 58.9 | +8.1 |
| SNP | Scott Harvie | 507 | 29.2 | −1.6 |
| Conservative | Carole McKinley | 207 | 11.9 | +2 |
| Majority | | 517 | 29.7 | +9.7 |
| Turnout | | 1,755 | 44.2 | −8.4 |
| Labour hold | | Swing | +4.9 | |

Cambusnethan
| Party | Candidate | Votes | % | ±% |
|---|---|---|---|---|
| Labour | Thomas Selfridge | 871 | 48.2 | +7.2 |
| SNP | John Taggart | 656 | 36.3 | −1.5 |
| Conservative | Mark Nolan | 281 | 15.5 | +2.2 |
| Majority | | 215 | 11.9 | +8.7 |
| Turnout | | 1,821 | 52.1 | −8.5 |
| Labour hold | | Swing | +4.4 | |

Coltness
| Party | Candidate | Votes | % | ±% |
|---|---|---|---|---|
| Labour | Ernest Holloway | 1,039 | 61.7 | +8.5 |
| SNP | J David McIntosh | 279 | 16.6 | −18.6 |
| Conservative | Sarah Bishop | 216 | 12.8 | +1.2 |
| Scottish Socialist | William Kelly | 150 | 8.9 | N/A |
| Majority | | 760 | 45.1 | +27.1 |
| Turnout | | 1,694 | 50.4 | −9.6 |
| Labour hold | | Swing | +13.6 | |

Watsonville
| Party | Candidate | Votes | % | ±% |
|---|---|---|---|---|
| SNP | Alan Valentine | 997 | 54.4 | +14.3 |
| Labour | Robert Millar | 670 | 36.6 | −2.9 |
| Conservative | Neil Richardson | 165 | 9.0 | −2.4 |
| Majority | | 327 | 17.8 | +17.2 |
| Turnout | | 1,840 | 48.7 | −10.2 |
| SNP hold | | Swing | +8.6 | |

Knowetop
| Party | Candidate | Votes | % | ±% |
|---|---|---|---|---|
| Labour | William Wilson | 960 | 54.9 | +2.6 |
| SNP | Annette Valentine | 565 | 32.3 | −0.8 |
| Conservative | Colin Gibson | 224 | 12.8 | −1.7 |
| Majority | | 395 | 22.6 | +3.4 |
| Turnout | | 1,764 | 50.0 | −10.2 |
| Labour hold | | Swing | +1.7 | |

Muirhouse & Netherton
| Party | Candidate | Votes | % | ±% |
|---|---|---|---|---|
| Labour | Gerald McLaughlin | 1,157 | 67.2 | +10.4 |
| SNP | Joanne O'Brien | 369 | 21.4 | −14.1 |
| Conservative | Linsey Burgess | 196 | 11.4 | +3.8 |
| Majority | | 788 | 45.8 | +24.5 |
| Turnout | | 1,727 | 47.4 | −7.0 |
| Labour hold | | Swing | +12.3 | |

Pather & Gowkthrapple
| Party | Candidate | Votes | % | ±% |
|---|---|---|---|---|
| Labour | John F McGhee | 960 | 72.9 | +10.8 |
| SNP | Alan O'Brien | 260 | 19.8 | −13.0 |
| Conservative | David L Gurr | 96 | 7.3 | +2.2 |
| Majority | | 700 | 53.2 | +23.9 |
| Turnout | | 1,324 | 40.2 | −9.2 |
| Labour hold | | Swing | +11.9 | |

Garrion
| Party | Candidate | Votes | % | ±% |
|---|---|---|---|---|
| Labour | John Pentland | 1,129 | 60.1 | +10.3 |
| SNP | James Hume | 512 | 27.3 | −10.4 |
| Conservative | Elizabeth Gallacher | 236 | 12.6 | +0.1 |
| Majority | | 617 | 32.9 | +20.8 |
| Turnout | | 1,889 | 53.8 | −6.1 |
| Labour hold | | Swing | +10.4 | |

Newmains
| Party | Candidate | Votes | % | ±% |
|---|---|---|---|---|
| Independent | David McKendrick | 892 | 48.7 | −7.8 |
| Independent | Robert McKendrick | 808 | 44.1 | +17.5 |
| SNP | Scott Steedman | 132 | 7.2 | N/A |
| Majority | | 84 | 4.6 | −25.3 |
| Turnout | | 1,842 | 52.8 | −9.9 |
| Independent hold | | Swing | -12.7 | |

Stane
| Party | Candidate | Votes | % | ±% |
|---|---|---|---|---|
| Independent | Frank Gormill | 865 | 46.6 | N/A |
| Labour | Francis Fallan | 699 | 37.6 | −28.3 |
| SNP | Malcolm McMillan | 293 | 15.8 | −18.3 |
| Majority | | 166 | 8.9 | −22.9 |
| Turnout | | 1,874 | 50.1 | −6.7 |
| Independent gain from Labour | | Swing | +37.5 | |

Dykehead
| Party | Candidate | Votes | % | ±% |
|---|---|---|---|---|
| Labour | James Robertson | 979 | 69.6 | +3.4 |
| SNP | William Steedman | 428 | 30.4 | −3.5 |
| Majority | | 551 | 39.2 | +6.9 |
| Turnout | | 1,416 | 42.8 | −11.2 |
| Labour hold | | Swing | +3.5 | |

Cleland
| Party | Candidate | Votes | % | ±% |
|---|---|---|---|---|
| Labour | James Martin | 1,160 | 69.3 | −7.9 |
| Independent | Pat Moran | 236 | 14.1 | N/A |
| SNP | Malcolm Durno | 179 | 10.7 | −12.1 |
| Conservative | James Paterson | 98 | 5.9 | N/A |
| Majority | | 924 | 55.2 | +0.7 |
| Turnout | | 1,678 | 48.8 | −9.2 |
| Labour hold | | Swing | -11.0 | |

Benhar
| Party | Candidate | Votes | % | ±% |
|---|---|---|---|---|
| Independent | Charles Cefferty | 1,210 | 75.7 | +22.6 |
| SNP | Martha White | 389 | 24.3 | +6.9 |
| Majority | | 821 | 51.3 | +27.8 |
| Turnout | | 1,650 | 47.3 | −15.1 |
| Independent hold | | Swing | +7.9 | |

Tannochside
| Party | Candidate | Votes | % | ±% |
|---|---|---|---|---|
| Labour | David Saunders | 1,181 | 62.1 | +4.6 |
| SNP | David Baird | 444 | 23.3 | −5.0 |
| Conservative | Elizabeth McLeod | 277 | 14.6 | +0.5 |
| Majority | | 737 | 38.7 | +9.5 |
| Turnout | | 1,922 | 49.1 | −11.4 |
| Labour hold | | Swing | +4.8 | |

Fallside
| Party | Candidate | Votes | % | ±% |
|---|---|---|---|---|
| Labour | Robert Burrows | 902 | 53.1 | −10.9 |
| Independent | Charles Hebenton | 472 | 27.8 | +27.8 |
| SNP | Helen Gallett | 230 | 13.5 | −13.5 |
| Conservative | Christopher Morgan | 95 | 5.6 | −3.3 |
| Majority | | 430 | 25.3 | −11.7 |
| Turnout | | 1,711 | 45.0 | −7.3 |
| Labour hold | | Swing | -19.4 | |

Viewpark
| Party | Candidate | Votes | % | ±% |
|---|---|---|---|---|
| Labour | James McCabe | 1,323 | | |
| SNP | John Gilmour | 349 | | |
| Conservative | Douglas Le Blonde | 53 | | |
| Majority | | 974 | | |
| Turnout | | 1,739 | 46.3 | |
| Labour hold | | Swing | | |

Bellshill North
| Party | Candidate | Votes | % | ±% |
|---|---|---|---|---|
| Labour | Henry McGuigan | 1,187 | | |
| SNP | Gary Gallett | 360 | | |
| Conservative | George Clark | 149 | | |
| Majority | | 827 | | |
| Turnout | | 1,706 | 45.6 | |
| Labour hold | | Swing | | |

Orbiston
| Party | Candidate | Votes | % | ±% |
|---|---|---|---|---|
| SNP | Richard Lyle | 1,182 | | |
| Labour | Geraldine Woods | 460 | | |
| Conservative | Robert Hargrave | 86 | | |
| Majority | | 722 | | |
| Turnout | | 1,736 | 48.8 | |
| SNP hold | | Swing | | |

Mossend West & Thorndean
| Party | Candidate | Votes | % | ±% |
|---|---|---|---|---|
| Labour | Joseph Gorman | 844 | | |
| SNP | Anne Caldwell | 603 | | |
| Conservative | Arthur Pawson | 121 | | |
| Majority | | 241 | | |
| Turnout | | 1,588 | 44.2 | |
| Labour hold | | Swing | | |

Holytown
| Party | Candidate | Votes | % | ±% |
|---|---|---|---|---|
| Labour | James Coyle | 1,216 | | |
| SNP | E Linda Muir | 308 | | |
| Conservative | James McLeod | 131 | | |
| Majority | | 908 | | |
| Turnout | | 1,666 | 46.0 | |
| Labour hold | | Swing | | |

Mossend East & New Stevenston North
| Party | Candidate | Votes | % | ±% |
|---|---|---|---|---|
| Labour | Kevin McKeown | 942 | | |
| SNP | Keith Caldwell | 485 | | |
| Conservative | Elizabeth Muir | 131 | | |
| Majority | | 457 | | |
| Turnout | | 1,572 | 40.9 | |
| Labour hold | | Swing | | |

Newarthill
| Party | Candidate | Votes | % | ±% |
|---|---|---|---|---|
| Labour | John Lafferty | 1,095 | | |
| SNP | Laura Anne Love | 336 | | |
| Conservative | David I Paterson | 107 | | |
| Majority | | 759 | | |
| Turnout | | 1,544 | 43.8 | |
| Labour hold | | Swing | | |

Hattonrig
| Party | Candidate | Votes | % | ±% |
|---|---|---|---|---|
| Labour | Harry Curran | 1,096 | | |
| SNP | Michael Carroll | 411 | | |
| Conservative | Glen McLeod | 141 | | |
| Majority | | 685 | | |
| Turnout | | 1,653 | 44.6 | |
| Labour hold | | Swing | | |

Townhead
| Party | Candidate | Votes | % | ±% |
|---|---|---|---|---|
| Labour | Anthony Clarke | 888 | | |
| SNP | Martin McWilliams | 555 | | |
| Majority | | 333 | | |
| Turnout | | 1,467 | 43.4 | |
| Labour hold | | Swing | | |

Blairpark
| Party | Candidate | Votes | % | ±% |
|---|---|---|---|---|
| Labour | William Shields | 907 | | |
| SNP | Francis McGlinchey | 641 | | |
| Majority | | 266 | | |
| Turnout | | 1,607 | 45.9 | |
| Labour hold | | Swing | | |

North Central & Glenboig
| Party | Candidate | Votes | % | ±% |
|---|---|---|---|---|
| Labour | Mary Clark | 844 | | |
| SNP | John Wilson | 407 | | |
| Independent | James McKinlay | 364 | | |
| Majority | | 437 | | |
| Turnout | | 1,631 | 45.4 | |
| Labour hold | | Swing | | |

Coatbridge Central
| Party | Candidate | Votes | % | ±% |
|---|---|---|---|---|
| Labour | Thomas Nolan | 976 | | |
| SNP | John Russell | 340 | | |
| Scottish Socialist | Audrey McMath | 135 | | |
| Majority | | 636 | | |
| Turnout | | 1,485 | 39.9 | |
| Labour hold | | Swing | | |

Sikeside & Carnbroe
| Party | Candidate | Votes | % | ±% |
|---|---|---|---|---|
| Labour | John Cassidy | 910 | | |
| SNP | James Gribben | 446 | | |
| Liberty Party | John McGeechan | 131 | | |
| Majority | | 464 | | |
| Turnout | | 1,492 | 41.2 | |
| Labour hold | | Swing | | |

Bargeddie & Langloan
| Party | Candidate | Votes | % | ±% |
|---|---|---|---|---|
| Labour | Andrew Burns | 1,058 | | |
| SNP | Michael Heaney | 326 | | |
| Majority | | 732 | | |
| Turnout | | 1,410 | 40.3 | |
| Labour hold | | Swing | | |

Kirkwood
| Party | Candidate | Votes | % | ±% |
|---|---|---|---|---|
| Labour | James Smith | 1,235 | | |
| SNP | Maureen Hagerty | 222 | | |
| Majority | | 1,013 | | |
| Turnout | | 1,470 | 42.5 | |
| Labour hold | | Swing | | |

Kirkshaws
| Party | Candidate | Votes | % | ±% |
|---|---|---|---|---|
| Labour | John Gordon | 1,284 | | |
| SNP | Colin Hagerty | 307 | | |
| Majority | | 977 | | |
| Turnout | | 1,606 | 44.2 | |
| Labour hold | | Swing | | |

Shawhead
| Party | Candidate | Votes | % | ±% |
|---|---|---|---|---|
| Labour | James Brooks | 1,301 | | |
| SNP | David Sharp | 213 | | |
| Majority | | 1,088 | | |
| Turnout | | 1,532 | 46.0 | |
| Labour hold | | Swing | | |

Old Monkland
| Party | Candidate | Votes | % | ±% |
|---|---|---|---|---|
| Labour | Thomas Maginnis | 1,195 | | |
| SNP | Louisa Sands | 252 | | |
| Majority | | 943 | | |
| Turnout | | 1,454 | 45.9 | |
| Labour hold | | Swing | | |

Whinhall
| Party | Candidate | Votes | % | ±% |
|---|---|---|---|---|
| Labour | George Devine | 819 | | |
| SNP | Alan White | 332 | | |
| Scottish Socialist | John Moffat | 139 | | |
| Majority | | 487 | | |
| Turnout | | 1,307 | 38.3 | |
| Labour hold | | Swing | | |

Academy
| Party | Candidate | Votes | % | ±% |
|---|---|---|---|---|
| Labour | James McGuigan | 936 | | |
| SNP | Alice Homer | 466 | | |
| Majority | | 470 | | |
| Turnout | | 1,412 | 41.0 | |
| Labour hold | | Swing | | |

Airdrie Central
| Party | Candidate | Votes | % | ±% |
|---|---|---|---|---|
| Labour | James Logue | 963 | | |
| SNP | Gail Cameron | 447 | | |
| Majority | | 516 | | |
| Turnout | | 1,425 | 42.5 | |
| Labour hold | | Swing | | |

Clarkston
| Party | Candidate | Votes | % | ±% |
|---|---|---|---|---|
| SNP | Campbell Cameron | 807 | | |
| Labour | Kenneth McCully | 348 | | |
| Liberal Democrats | Mavis Drummond | 155 | | |
| Scottish Socialist | Fraser Coats | 114 | | |
| Majority | | 459 | | |
| Turnout | | 1,434 | 40.5 | |
| SNP hold | | Swing | | |

New Monkland West
| Party | Candidate | Votes | % | ±% |
|---|---|---|---|---|
| SNP | Sophia Coyle | 724 | | |
| Labour | Morag Thompson | 693 | | |
| Majority | | 31 | | |
| Turnout | | 1,448 | 38.9 | |
| SNP hold | | Swing | | |

Plains & Caldercruix
| Party | Candidate | Votes | % | ±% |
|---|---|---|---|---|
| Labour | Thomas Morgan | 1,217 | | |
| SNP | Barry McMillan | 361 | | |
| Majority | | 856 | | |
| Turnout | | 1,594 | 45.4 | |
| Labour hold | | Swing | | |

North Cairnhill & Coatdyke
| Party | Candidate | Votes | % | ±% |
|---|---|---|---|---|
| Labour | Peter Sullivan | 924 | | |
| SNP | James Gibb | 349 | | |
| Liberal Democrats | Janet Oni-Orisan | 301 | | |
| Majority | | 575 | | |
| Turnout | | 1,594 | 46.1 | |
| Labour hold | | Swing | | |

South East Cairnhill & Gartlea
| Party | Candidate | Votes | % | ±% |
|---|---|---|---|---|
| SNP | David Stocks | 812 | | |
| Labour | Anthony Beekman | 453 | | |
| Liberal Democrats | Patricia Maguire | 304 | | |
| Majority | | 359 | | |
| Turnout | | 1,580 | 44.3 | |
| SNP hold | | Swing | | |

Craigneuk & Petersburn
| Party | Candidate | Votes | % | ±% |
|---|---|---|---|---|
| Labour | Donna Morris | 764 | | |
| SNP | Michael Coyle | 448 | | |
| Majority | | 316 | | |
| Turnout | | 1,234 | 36.3 | |
| Labour hold | | Swing | | |

Calderbank
| Party | Candidate | Votes | % | ±% |
|---|---|---|---|---|
| Labour | Patrick Donnelly | 827 | | |
| SNP | Margaret Lynch | 415 | | |
| Liberal Democrats | Elizabeth McIntyre | 303 | | |
| Majority | | 412 | | |
| Turnout | | 1,562 | 46.9 | |
| Labour hold | | Swing | | |

Chapelhall
| Party | Candidate | Votes | % | ±% |
|---|---|---|---|---|
| Labour | Tom Curley | Unopposed | | |
| Majority | | | | |
| Turnout | | | | |
| Labour hold | | Swing | | |

Salsburgh
| Party | Candidate | Votes | % | ±% |
|---|---|---|---|---|
| Labour | David Fagan | 708 | | |
| SNP | Marion IK Millar | 493 | | |
| Scottish Socialist | Gordon Martin | 280 | | |
| Majority | | 215 | | |
| Turnout | | 1,515 | 38.5 | |
| Labour hold | | Swing | | |

Kildrum & Park
| Party | Candidate | Votes | % | ±% |
|---|---|---|---|---|
| SNP | Margaret Murray | 974 | | |
| Labour | Allan Graham | 587 | | |
| Scottish Socialist | Andrew Locke | 171 | | |
| Majority | | 387 | | |
| Turnout | | 1,744 | 51.0 | |
| SNP hold | | Swing | | |

Seafar & The Village
| Party | Candidate | Votes | % | ±% |
|---|---|---|---|---|
| SNP | Neil McCallum | 1,259 | | |
| Labour | Gerald Somers | 446 | | |
| Majority | | 813 | | |
| Turnout | | 1,730 | 49.5 | |
| SNP hold | | Swing | | |

Balloch East & Ravenswood
| Party | Candidate | Votes | % | ±% |
|---|---|---|---|---|
| SNP | Elizabeth Gemmell | 1,257 | | |
| Labour | Jane Taylor | 700 | | |
| Majority | | 557 | | |
| Turnout | | 1,988 | 52.4 | |
| SNP hold | | Swing | | |

Balloch West, Blackwood East & Craigmarloch
| Party | Candidate | Votes | % | ±% |
|---|---|---|---|---|
| Labour | Barry McCulloch | 868 | | |
| SNP | Scott MacFarlane | 774 | | |
| Independent | Christopher Donohue | 140 | | |
| Scottish Socialist | John Miller | 110 | | |
| Majority | | 94 | | |
| Turnout | | 1,907 | 48.7 | |
| Labour hold | | Swing | | |

Westerwood, Carrickstone & Dullatur
| Party | Candidate | Votes | % | ±% |
|---|---|---|---|---|
| SNP | Gordon Murray | 1,267 | | |
| Labour | Danny Howley | 574 | | |
| Majority | | 693 | | |
| Turnout | | 1,875 | 46.8 | |
| SNP hold | | Swing | | |

Abronhill South
| Party | Candidate | Votes | % | ±% |
|---|---|---|---|---|
| SNP | William Carmichael | 879 | | |
| Labour | Elizabeth Hughes | 489 | | |
| Scottish Socialist | Gary Bannatyne | 141 | | |
| Liberal Democrats | Hugh O'Donnell | 87 | | |
| Majority | | 390 | | |
| Turnout | | 1,604 | 47.6 | |
| SNP hold | | Swing | | |

Abronhill Central & North
| Party | Candidate | Votes | % | ±% |
|---|---|---|---|---|
| SNP | Elizabeth Irvine | 935 | | |
| Labour | James Hunt | 537 | | |
| Scottish Socialist | Charles McBride | 142 | | |
| Liberal Democrats | Carol Boyle | 109 | | |
| Independent | Robert Orr | 103 | | |
| Majority | | 398 | | |
| Turnout | | 1,831 | 50.1 | |
| SNP hold | | Swing | | |

Carbrain East
| Party | Candidate | Votes | % | ±% |
|---|---|---|---|---|
| SNP | William Homer | 756 | | |
| Labour | Robert Gordon | 453 | | |
| Scottish Socialist | Brian Scott | 150 | | |
| Majority | | 303 | | |
| Turnout | | 1,364 | 40.0 | |
| SNP hold | | Swing | | |

Carbrain West & Greenfaulds
| Party | Candidate | Votes | % | ±% |
|---|---|---|---|---|
| SNP | William Goldie | 839 | | |
| Labour | Stephen Grant | 599 | | |
| Scottish Socialist | Jacqueline Hair | 176 | | |
| Majority | | 240 | | |
| Turnout | | 1,624 | 47.0 | |
| SNP gain from Labour | | Swing | | |

Condorrat Central
| Party | Candidate | Votes | % | ±% |
|---|---|---|---|---|
| Labour | Gerard McElroy | 863 | | |
| SNP | Patricia Currie | 786 | | |
| Scottish Socialist | Kevin P McVey | 217 | | |
| Majority | | 77 | | |
| Turnout | | 1,884 | 52.1 | |
| Labour hold | | Swing | | |

Condorrat North & Westfield
| Party | Candidate | Votes | % | ±% |
|---|---|---|---|---|
| Labour | Balwant Singh Chadha | 992 | | |
| SNP | Ronald McCambridge | 719 | | |
| Scottish Socialist | Angela Reid | 174 | | |
| Majority | | 273 | | |
| Turnout | | 1,906 | 51.7 | |
| Labour hold | | Swing | | |

Croy, Kilsyth South & Smithstone
| Party | Candidate | Votes | % | ±% |
|---|---|---|---|---|
| Labour | Francis Griffin | 972 | | |
| SNP | Ian McCann | 244 | | |
| Scottish Socialist | William O'Neill | 121 | | |
| Majority | | 728 | | |
| Turnout | | 1,347 | 47.5 | |
| Labour hold | | Swing | | |

Queenzieburn & Kilsyth West
| Party | Candidate | Votes | % | ±% |
|---|---|---|---|---|
| Labour | Jean Jones | 976 | | |
| SNP | David Moira | 739 | | |
| Majority | | 237 | | |
| Turnout | | 1,730 | 50.5 | |
| Labour hold | | Swing | | |

Banton & Kilsyth East
| Party | Candidate | Votes | % | ±% |
|---|---|---|---|---|
| Labour | Tom Barrie | 983 | | |
| SNP | Ewen Gilmour | 573 | | |
| Scottish Socialist | Thomas Smyth | 134 | | |
| Majority | | 410 | | |
| Turnout | | 1,711 | 51.4 | |
| Labour hold | | Swing | | |

Moodiesburn East & Blackwood West
| Party | Candidate | Votes | % | ±% |
|---|---|---|---|---|
| Labour | William Hogg | 1,086 | | |
| SNP | Aileen McLaughlin | 416 | | |
| Scottish Socialist | Ann Marie McGivern | 181 | | |
| Majority | | 670 | | |
| Turnout | | 1,707 | 45.3 | |
| Labour hold | | Swing | | |

Moodiesburn West & Gartcosh
| Party | Candidate | Votes | % | ±% |
|---|---|---|---|---|
| Labour | Joseph Shaw | 909 | | |
| SNP | Isabella Chisholm | 465 | | |
| Majority | | 444 | | |
| Turnout | | 1,407 | 42.8 | |
| Labour hold | | Swing | | |

Chryston & Auchinloch
| Party | Candidate | Votes | % | ±% |
|---|---|---|---|---|
| Labour | Charles Gray | 1,242 | | |
| SNP | Jean Welsh | 461 | | |
| Majority | | 781 | | |
| Turnout | | 1,725 | 50.6 | |
| Labour hold | | Swing | | |

Stepps
| Party | Candidate | Votes | % | ±% |
|---|---|---|---|---|
| Labour | Brian Wallace | 1,305 | | |
| SNP | Eric Martin | 520 | | |
| Majority | | 785 | | |
| Turnout | | 1,873 | 50.3 | |
| Labour hold | | Swing | | |
