= 2003 Dundee City Council election =

2003 Scottish local government election

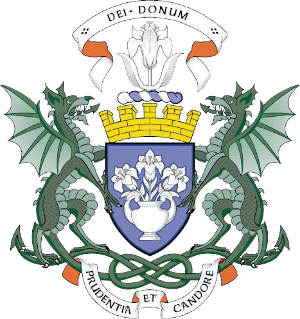
← 1999	1 May 2003	2007 →

All 29 seats to Dundee City Council 15 seats needed for a majority
	First party	Second party	Third party
Party	SNP	Labour	Conservative
Seats won	11	10	5
Seat change	▲1	▼4	▲1
Popular vote	17,677	17,656	7,728
Percentage	34.1%	34.1%	14.9%
	Fourth party	Fifth party
Party	Liberal Democrats	Independent
Seats won	2	1
Seat change	▲2	▲1
Popular vote	5,152	1,817
Percentage	9.9%	3.5%
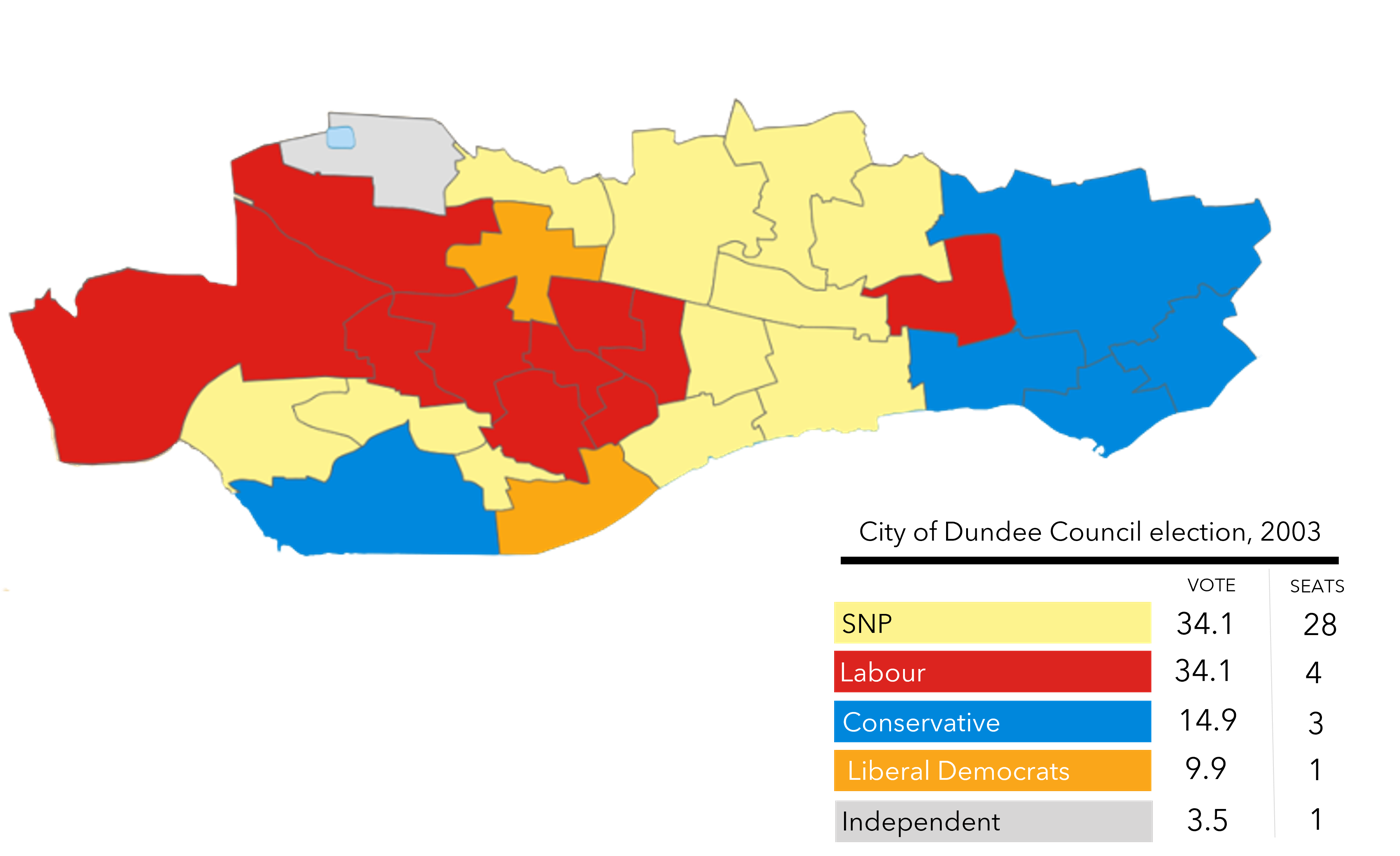
- The 29 single-member wards

The 2003 Dundee City Council election was held on 1 May 2003, the same day as the other Scottish local government elections and the Scottish Parliament general election.

== Results ==
2003 Dundee City Council election result
Party	Seats	Gains	Losses	Net gain/loss	Seats %	Votes %	Votes	+/−
SNP	11	4	3	▲1	37.9	34.1	17,677	
Labour	10	1	5	▼4	34.5	34.1	17,656	
Conservative	5	1	0	▲1	17.2	14.9	7,728	
Liberal Democrats	2	2	0	▲2	6.9	9.9	5,152	
Independent	1	0	0	▲1	3.4	3.5	1,817	
Scottish Socialist	0	0	0	Steady	0.0	3.5	1,814	

== Ward results ==
Ardler
Party	Candidate	Votes	%	±%
Labour	Kevin Keenan	631	52.2	+6.1
SNP	John M White	399	33.0	−6.0
Scottish Socialist	Pamela A Cathro	91	7.5	+0.2
Liberal Democrats	Christina S Marshall	75	6.2	N/A
Majority		232	19.2	+12.2
Turnout		1209	50.40	+4.64

Balgay
Party	Candidate	Votes	%
SNP	Bob Duncan	915	40.6
Labour	Betty Ward	892	39.5
Conservative	Maurice C Golden	215	9.5
Liberal Democrats	Donald R MacDonald	213	9.4
Majority		23	1.0
Turnout		2256	57.52

Balgillo
Party	Candidate	Votes	%
Conservative	Roderick A J Wallace	1,140	43.2
SNP	Stewart Hosie	898	34.1
Labour	Derek Easson	437	16.6
Liberal Democrats	Margaret K Romberg	143	5.4
Majority		242	9.2
Turnout		2633	53.34

Balgowan
Party	Candidate	Votes	%
SNP	Rikki Beattle	811	44.9
Labour	Colin P Rennie	709	39.2
Liberal Democrats	Elizabeth G Stansfield	146	8.1
Scottish Socialist	Patricia Hadrysiak	132	7.3
Majority		102	5.6
Turnout		1808	46.54

Barnhill
Party	Candidate	Votes	%
Conservative	Bruce D Mackie	1,158	48.7
SNP	Robert A Piggot	625	26.3
Labour	William C Lawson	372	15.6
Liberal Democrats	Jane S C Milroy	213	8.9
Majority		533	22.4
Turnout		2380	57.92

Baxter Park
Party	Candidate	Votes	%
SNP	Elizabeth F Fordyce	706	41.4
Labour	Patricia Barr	501	29.4
Conservative	Donald E Hay	285	16.7
Liberal Democrats	Jason J Van Der Velde	138	8.1
Scottish Socialist	Michael O Kelleher	69	4.0
Majority		205	12.0
Turnout		1705	45.96

Bowbridge
Party	Candidate	Votes	%
Labour	Christopher J Hind	607	
SNP	David Bowes	545	
Scottish Socialist	Pamela H Manley	120	
Liberal Democrats	Elizabeth G Dick	97	
Majority		62	
Turnout		1384	39.77

Brackens
Party	Candidate	Votes	%
Independent	Ian Borthwick	1,306	
SNP	Henry Whitcombe	339	
Labour	John P McKiddie	296	
Scottish Socialist	Alan Boylan	114	
Majority		967	
Turnout		2065	50.16

Broughty Ferry
Party	Candidate	Votes	%
Conservative	Charles A Webster	820	
SNP	Kenneth J N Guild	767	
Labour	Alex Perry	453	
Liberal Democrats	Ian G Boyack	207	
Majority		53	
Turnout		2257	53.19

Camperdown
Party	Candidate	Votes	%
Labour	John R Letford	840	
SNP	Stewart R Hunter	665	
Scottish Socialist	Andrew Armstrong	93	
Liberal Democrats	Colin Newell	71	
Conservative	Christopher McKinlay	56	
Majority		175	
Turnout		1730	45.29

Claverhouse
Party	Candidate	Votes	%
SNP	Andrew F H Dawson	747	
Labour	Brian Gordon	658	
Liberal Democrats	Andrew D Judson	82	
Conservative	Gladys E A Ross	56	
Majority		89	
Turnout		1548	46.20

Craigiebank
Party	Candidate	Votes	%
SNP	John Corrigan	989	
Labour	Malcolm S May	799	
Conservative	Colin E Stewart	277	
Liberal Democrats	George B Jones	139	
Majority		190	
Turnout		2221	60.70

Douglas
Party	Candidate	Votes	%
Labour	George Regan	827	
SNP	Kenneth H Lynn	743	
Scottish Socialist	Philip A Stott	86	
Conservative	Jennifer A Barnes	72	
Liberal Democrats	Alice McCall	68	
Majority		84	
Turnout		1802	45.76

East Port
Party	Candidate	Votes	%
SNP	William Dawson	536	
Labour	Neil Glen	527	
Conservative	John Doig	128	
Liberal Democrats	Linda J Stott	119	
Scottish Socialist	Mark Walker	94	
Majority		9	
Turnout		1418	36.58

Fairmuir
Party	Candidate	Votes	%
Labour	Helen W Wright	1,017	
SNP	Anna Easton	504	
Conservative	Doris M Cowan	153	
Scottish Socialist	Kevin McQuillan	84	
Liberal Democrats	Crispin Stansfield	67	
Majority		513	
Turnout		1847	50.48

Hilltown
Party	Candidate	Votes	%
Labour	Fiona M Grant	615	
SNP	Thomas J Dempsey	517	
Scottish Socialist	Harvey Duke	125	
Liberal Democrats	Anna Dickinson	90	
Conservative	William D Cowan	55	
Majority		98	
Turnout		1409	36.87

Law
Party	Candidate	Votes	%
Labour	Julia M Sturrock	832	
SNP	Andrew E Jack	586	
Liberal Democrats	Robin L Hill	236	
Majority		246	
Turnout		1678	44.96

Lochee East
Party	Candidate	Votes	%
Labour	Charles D P Farquhar	1,086	
SNP	Catherine Bowes	532	
Conservative	Stephanie J Allen	112	
Liberal Democrats	Carol Ferrier	90	
Scottish Socialist	Sarah McDonald	97	
Majority		554	
Turnout		1947	51.52

Lochee West
Party	Candidate	Votes	%
Labour	Jill Shimi	856	
SNP	William D Douglas	451	
Scottish Socialist	Alan H Manley	102	
Conservative	Claire Alexander	88	
Liberal Democrats	Sheila M Tennant	59	
Independent	Stewart Cunningham	49	
Majority		405	
Turnout		1613	47.75

Logie
Party	Candidate	Votes	%
SNP	James W Barrie	475	
Liberal Democrats	Jane-Claire Judson	425	
Labour	Richard B McCready	388	
Scottish Socialist	Roderick MacGregor	120	
Conservative	Christopher M Bustin	95	
Majority		50	
Turnout		1508	43.67

Longhaugh
Party	Candidate	Votes	%
SNP	Joe Fitzpatrick	851	
Labour	George Mason	643	
Scottish Socialist	Nicholas C Steff	77	
Liberal Democrats	David A Stansfield	42	
Conservative	Lachlan W Webster	34	
Majority		208	
Turnout		1652	42.32

Ninewells
Party	Candidate	Votes	%
SNP	Nigel A Don	709	
Labour	George De Gernier	675	
Scottish Socialist	Shaun Taylor	111	
Liberal Democrats	David J K Balfour	100	
Conservative	Gary C Southwick	97	
Majority		34	
Turnout		1698	46.48

Pitkerro
Party	Candidate	Votes	%
SNP	Christina Roberts	587	
Labour	Charles Robertson	538	
Independent	Allan Petrie	462	
Conservative	Margaret A Scott	53	
Majority		49	
Turnout		1648	41.73

Riverside
Party	Candidate	Votes	%
Conservative	Neil I C Powrie	1,365	
SNP	Wendy L Wrieden	463	
Labour	Pritam S Chita	411	
Liberal Democrats	John R McIntosh	209	
Majority		902	
Turnout		2458	57.35

Stobswell
Party	Candidate	Votes	%
Labour	Joe Morrow	591	
SNP	James C Duthie	483	
Liberal Democrats	Raymond A Lawrie	214	
Scottish Socialist	Derek Milligan	93	
Conservative	John M McCraw	93	
Majority		108	
Turnout		1455	40.38

Strathmartine
Party	Candidate	Votes	%
Liberal Democrats	Helen Dick	717	
SNP	David S Beattie	634	
Labour	Alan Cowan	523	
Conservative	Thomas S McLeod	110	
Scottish Socialist	Colin W Brown	61	
Majority		83	
Turnout		2051	55.27

Tay Bridges
Party	Candidate	Votes	%
Liberal Democrats	Fraser MacPherson	940	
Labour	Norma M McGovern	234	
SNP	Graham A Young	152	
Scottish Socialist	Mary M Ward	101	
Conservative	Ann G L Powrie	49	
Majority		706	
Turnout		1484	35.96

West Ferry
Party	Candidate	Votes	%
Conservative	Derek J Scott	1,189	
SNP	Anya J Lawrence	450	
Labour	Margaret H Marshall	362	
Liberal Democrats	Allan Beat	213	
Majority		739	
Turnout		2223	55.62

Whitfield
Party	Candidate	Votes	%
SNP	Willie Sawers	598	
Labour	Ina Paton	336	
Scottish Socialist	Brian Hood	44	
Liberal Democrats	Robert Cowie	39	
Conservative	Catherine O Murray	28	
Majority		262	
Turnout		1050	42.51
