= List of elections in 2003 =

The following elections occurred in the year 2003.

== Africa ==
- 2003 Beninese parliamentary election
- 2003 Djiboutian parliamentary election
- 2003 Guinean presidential election
- 2003 Mauritanian presidential election
- 2003 Nigerian parliamentary election
- 2003 Nigerian presidential election
- 2003 Rwandan presidential election
- 2003 Rwandan parliamentary election
- 2003 Rwandan constitutional referendum
- 2003 Somaliland presidential election
- 2003 Swazi parliamentary election
- 2003 Togolese presidential election

== Asia ==
- 2003 Armenian presidential election
- 2003 Armenian parliamentary election
- 2003 Armenian constitutional referendum
- 2003 Azerbaijani presidential election
- 2003 Cambodian parliamentary election
- 2003 Cypriot presidential election
- 2003 Georgian constitutional referendum
- 2003 Georgian parliamentary election
- 2003 Iranian local elections
- 2003 Israeli legislative election
- 2003 Israeli municipal elections
- 2003 Jordanian local elections
- 2003 Jordanian parliamentary election
- 2003 Kuwaiti parliamentary election
- 2003 Maldivian presidential election
- 2003 North Korean local elections
- 2003 North Korean parliamentary election
- 2003 Omani parliamentary election
- 2003 Qatari constitutional referendum
- 2003 Romanian constitutional referendum
- 2003 Russian parliamentary election
- 2003 Syrian parliamentary election
- 2003 Tajik constitutional referendum
- 2003 Yemeni parliamentary election
- State Assembly elections in India, 2003

=== Japan ===
- 2003 Japanese general election
  - Results of the 2003 Japanese general election
- 2003 Shibuya mayoral election
- 2003 Tokyo gubernatorial election

== Europe ==
- 2003 Åland legislative election
- 2003 Albanian local elections
- 2003 Andorran local elections
- 2003 Armenian presidential election
- 2003 Armenian parliamentary election
- 2003 Azerbaijan presidential election
- 2003 Belgian general election
- 2003 Bulgarian local elections
- 2003 Corsican autonomy referendum
- 2003 Croatian parliamentary election
- 2003 Czech European Union membership referendum
- 2003 Czech presidential election
- 2003 Estonian parliamentary election
- 2003 Finnish parliamentary election
- 2003 Georgian constitutional referendum
- 2003 Georgian legislative election
- 2003 Gibraltar general election
- 2003 Icelandic parliamentary election
- 2003 Latvian presidential election
- 2003 Liechtenstein local elections
- 2003 Liechtenstein constitutional referendum
- 2002–2003 Lithuanian presidential election
- 2003 Maltese European Union membership referendum
- 2003 Maltese general election
- 2003 Moldovan local elections
- 2003 Monegasque parliamentary election
- February 2003 Montenegrin presidential election
- May 2003 Montenegrin presidential election
- 2003 Northern Cyprus parliamentary election
- 2003 Norwegian county council election
- 2003 Norwegian local elections
- 2003 Serbian local elections
- 2003 Serbian parliamentary election
- 2003 Serbian presidential election
- 2003 Moldovan local elections
- 2003 Transnistrian referendum
- 2003 Dutch general election
- 2003 Russian legislative election
- 2003 Sammarinese local elections
- 2003 Swedish euro referendum

=== Austria ===
- 2003 Lower Austrian state election
- 2003 Upper Austrian state election

=== Germany ===
- 2003 Bavaria state election
- 2003 Bremen state election
- 2003 Hesse state election
- 2003 Lower Saxony state election

=== Italy ===
- 2003 Friuli-Venezia Giulia regional election
- 2003 Trentino-Alto Adige/Südtirol provincial elections
- 2003 Valdostan regional election

=== Spain ===
- 2003 Catalan parliamentary election
- Elections to the Corts Valencianes, 2003
- Elections to the Aragonese Corts, 2003
- May 2003 Madrilenian regional election
- October 2003 Madrilenian regional election
- 2003 Spanish local elections

=== Switzerland ===
- 2003 Swiss Federal Council election
- 2003 Swiss federal election

=== United Kingdom ===
- 2003 Brent East by-election
- 2003 Conservative Party leadership election
- United Kingdom elections, 2003
- 2003 Liberal Democrats deputy leadership election
- 2003 United Kingdom local elections
- 2003 National Assembly for Wales election
- 2003 Northern Ireland Assembly election
- 2003 Scottish Parliament election

==== United Kingdom local ====
- 2003 United Kingdom local elections

===== English local =====
- 2003 Adur Council election
- 2003 Allerdale Council election
- 2003 Alnwick Council election
- 2003 Amber Valley Council election
- 2003 Arun Council election
- 2003 Ashfield Council election
- 2003 Ashford Council election
- 2003 Aylesbury Vale Council election
- 2003 Babergh Council election
- 2003 Barrow-in-Furness Council election
- 2003 Bassetlaw Council election
- 2003 Blackpool Council election
- 2003 Bolton Council election
- 2003 Brentwood Council election
- 2003 Broxbourne Council election
- 2003 Burnley Council election
- 2003 Calderdale Council election
- 2003 Cherwell Council election
- 2003 Chichester Council election
- 2003 Chorley Council election
- 2003 Corby Borough Council election
- 2003 Craven Council election
- 2003 Dacorum Council election
- 2003 Daventry Council election
- 2003 Derby Council election
- 2003 Eastleigh Council election
- 2003 Ellesmere Port and Neston Council election
- 2003 Epping Forest Council election
- 2003 Fylde Council election
- 2003 Gateshead Council election
- 2003 Harlow Council election
- 2003 Hart Council election
- 2003 Hinckley and Bosworth Council election
- 2003 Hull Council election
- 2003 Hyndburn Council election
- 2003 Ipswich Borough Council election
- 2003 Kettering Borough Council election
- 2003 Knowsley Council election
- 2003 Leeds Council election
- 2003 Lincoln Council election
- 2003 Liverpool Council election
- 2003 Mole Valley Council election
- 2003 Newcastle-under-Lyme Council election
- 2003 North Lincolnshire Council election
- 2003 North Tyneside Council election
- 2003 Northampton Council election
- 2003 Penwith Council election
- 2003 Portsmouth Council election
- 2003 Preston Council election
- 2003 Purbeck Council election
- 2003 Redditch Council election
- 2003 Restormel Council election
- 2003 Rochdale Council election
- 2003 Rochford Council election
- 2003 Rossendale Council election
- 2003 Rugby Council election
- 2003 Runnymede Council election
- 2003 Rushmoor Council election
- 2003 Ryedale Council election
- 2003 Salford Council election
- 2003 Scarborough Council election
- 2003 Sedgefield Council election
- 2003 Sedgemoor Council election
- 2003 Sefton Council election
- 2003 Sheffield Council election
- 2003 Solihull Council election
- 2003 South Gloucestershire Council election
- 2003 South Lakeland Council election
- 2003 South Oxfordshire Council election
- 2003 South Ribble Council election
- 2003 South Tyneside Council election
- 2003 Southend-on-Sea Council election
- 2003 St Albans Council election
- 2003 St Helens Council election
- 2003 Stafford Borough Council election
- 2003 Stevenage Council election
- 2003 Stratford-on-Avon Council election
- 2003 Swindon Council election
- 2003 Tamworth Council election
- 2003 Tandridge Council election
- 2003 Three Rivers Council election
- 2003 Trafford Council election
- 2003 Tunbridge Wells Council election
- 2003 Tynedale Council election
- 2003 Vale of White Horse Council election
- 2003 Wakefield Council election
- 2003 Watford Council election
- 2003 Waveney Council election
- 2003 Welwyn Hatfield Council election
- 2003 West Lancashire Council election
- 2003 West Lindsey Council election
- 2003 West Wiltshire Council election
- 2003 Weymouth and Portland Council election
- 2003 Wigan Council election
- 2003 Winchester Council election
- 2003 Windsor and Maidenhead Council election
- 2003 Wirral Council election
- 2003 Woking Council election
- 2003 Wokingham Council election
- 2003 Wolverhampton Council election
- 2003 Worcester Council election
- 2003 Worthing Council election
- 2003 Wyre Forest Council election
- 2003 York Council election

===== Scottish local =====
- 2003 Glasgow City Council election
- 2003 North Lanarkshire Council election
- 2003 South Lanarkshire Council election
- 2003 Highland Council election

== North America ==
- 2003 Belizean municipal elections
- 2003 Belizean legislative election
- 2003 Guatemalan general election
- 2003 Salvadoran legislative election

=== Canada ===
- Brigham municipal election
- 2003 Liberal Party of Canada leadership election
- 2003 Manitoba general election
- 2003 New Brunswick general election
- 2003 New Democratic Party leadership election
- New Democratic Party of Prince Edward Island candidates in the 2003 Prince Edward Island provincial election
- 2003 Newfoundland and Labrador general election
- 2003 Northwest Territories general election
- 2003 Nova Scotia general election
- 2003 Ontario general election
- 2003 Prince Edward Island Liberal Party leadership election
- 2003 Prince Edward Island general election
- 2003 Progressive Conservative leadership convention
- 2003 Quebec general election
- 2003 Quebec municipal elections
- 2003 Saskatchewan general election

==== Ontario municipal ====
- 2003 Ontario municipal elections
- 2003 Brantford municipal election
- 2003 Greater Sudbury municipal election
- 2003 Guelph municipal election
- 2003 Hamilton, Ontario municipal election
- 2003 Norfolk County municipal election
- 2003 Oakville municipal election
- 2003 Ottawa municipal election
- 2003 Peterborough municipal election
- 2003 St. Catharines municipal election
- 2003 Toronto municipal election
- 2003 Vaughan municipal election

=== Caribbean ===
- 2003 Barbadian general election
- 2003 Bermudian general election
- 2003 British Virgin Islands general election
- 2003 Cuban parliamentary election
- 2003 Grenadian general election
- 2003 Trinidadian local elections
- 2003 Trinidad and Tobago presidential election
- 2003 Turks and Caicos Islands general election

=== Mexico ===
- 2003 Mexican elections
- 2003 Colima state election
- 2003 Mexican legislative election
- 2003 Nuevo León state election

=== United States ===
- 2003 United States elections

==== United States House of Representatives ====
- 2003 United States House of Representatives elections
- 2003 Hawaii's 2nd congressional district special election
- 2003 Texas's 19th congressional district special election

==== United States lieutenant gubernatorial ====
- 2003 Louisiana lieutenant gubernatorial election

==== United States gubernatorial ====
- 2003 United States gubernatorial elections
  - 2003 California gubernatorial recall election
  - 2003 Louisiana gubernatorial election
  - 2003 Kentucky gubernatorial election
  - 2003 Mississippi general election
  - 2003 Mississippi gubernatorial election
  - 2003 Pennsylvania state elections

==== United States mayoral elections ====
- 2003 Akron mayoral election
- 2003 Anchorage mayoral election
- 2003 Arlington mayoral election
- 2003 Austin mayoral election
- 2003–04 Baltimore mayoral election
- 2003 Birmingham, Alabama mayoral election
- 2003 Boise mayoral election
- 2003 Charlotte mayoral election
- 2003 Chicago mayoral election
- 2003 Colorado Springs mayoral election
- 2003 Dallas mayoral election
- 2003 Denver mayoral election
- 2003 Des Moines mayoral election
- 2003 Durham mayoral election
- 2003 El Paso mayoral election
- 2003 Evansville, Indiana, mayoral election
- 2003 Fayetteville, North Carolina mayoral election
- 2003 Flint mayoral election
- 2003 Fort Lauderdale mayoral election
- 2003 Fort Wayne mayoral election
- 2003 Fort Worth mayoral election
- 2003 Grand Rapids mayoral election
- 2003 Green Bay mayoral election
- 2003 Hartford mayoral election
- 2003 Houston mayoral election
- 2003 Indianapolis mayoral election
- 2003 Jacksonville mayoral election
- 2003 Kansas City mayoral election
- 2003 Knoxville mayoral election
- 2003 Lansing mayoral special election
- 2003 Las Vegas mayoral election
- 2003 Lincoln, Nebraska mayoral election
- 2003 Madison mayoral election
- 2003 Manchester, New Hampshire, mayoral election
- 2003 Memphis mayoral election
- 2003 Montgomery mayoral election
- 2003 Nashville mayoral election
- 2003 Orlando mayoral special election
- 2003 Philadelphia mayoral election
- 2003 Phoenix mayoral election
- 2003 Raleigh mayoral election
- 2003 Salt Lake City mayoral election
- 2003 San Francisco mayoral election
- 2003 South Bend mayoral election
- 2003 Springfield, Massachusetts mayoral election
- 2003 Tallahassee mayoral special election
- 2003 Tampa mayoral election
- 2003 Tucson mayoral election
- 2003 Wichita mayoral election
- 2003 Worcester, Massachusetts mayoral election

== Oceania ==
- 2003 Arutanga by-election
- 2003 Kiribati parliamentary election
- February 2003 Kiribati presidential election
- July 2003 Kiribati presidential election
- 2003 Marshall Islands general election
- 2003 Micronesian general election
- 2003 Nauruan parliamentary election
- 2003 Rua'au by-election

=== Australia ===
- 2003 Katherine by-election
- 2003 Maryborough state by-election
- 2003 New South Wales state election

== South America ==
- 2003 Argentine general election
- 2003 Colombian constitutional referendum
- 2003 Paraguayan general election
