= 2003 Assembly election =

Three Assembly elections took place in 2003:

== India ==
- State Assembly elections in India, 2003

== Northern Ireland ==
- 2003 Northern Ireland Assembly election

== Wales ==
- 2003 National Assembly for Wales election

== See also ==
- List of elections in 2003
