= 2003 United States elections =

- ← 2001 2002 2003 2004 2005 → Off-year elections
- Election day: November 4

Congressional special elections
- Seats contested: 2
- Net seat change: 0

Gubernatorial elections
- Seats contested: 4
- Net seat change: Republican +2
- 2003 gubernatorial election results map

Legend
- Republican gain Democratic gain

Elections were held in the United States on November 4, 2003. These were off-year elections in which no members of the Congress stood for election. However, there were three gubernatorial races, state legislative elections in four states, numerous citizen initiatives, mayoral races in several major cities, and a variety of local offices on the ballot.

The most high-profile race during this year was the California gubernatorial recall election: California voters replaced incumbent Governor Gray Davis with actor Arnold Schwarzenegger.

== Federal elections ==
=== U.S. House of Representatives special elections ===
In 2003, two special elections to fill vacancies in the House of Representatives were held. They were for Hawaii's 2nd congressional district (on January 4) and Texas's 19th congressional district (June 3). None of these congressional seats changed party hands.

== State elections ==
=== Gubernatorial elections ===
Three states held elections for Governor in 2003. In addition to these regularly scheduled elections, California held a recall election. California held a recall election on October 7. Kentucky and Mississippi voted on November 4. Louisiana's election dates do not coincide with that of most states: Louisiana held its open primary on October 4, with a runoff on November 15.

Going into the elections, Republicans held the governorships of twenty-six states and Democrats held twenty-four. Republicans achieved a net gain of two with victories in Kentucky and Mississippi as well as the successful recall and replacement of Californian Governor Gray Davis with actor Arnold Schwarzenegger, but Democrats succeeded capturing Louisiana's Governorship. Thus, Republicans succeeded in reversing a trend in which Republicans had been losing gubernatorial seats to the Democrats since 1998.

=== Other statewide elections ===
In the three states which held regularly scheduled state general elections, elections for state executive branch offices of Lieutenant Governor (in a separate election in Louisiana and Mississippi and on the same ticket as the gubernatorial nominee in Kentucky), Secretary of state, state Treasurer, state Auditor, state Attorney General, and Commissioners of Insurance and Agriculture will be held. In addition, there will also be elections for each states' respective state Supreme Courts and state appellate courts.

=== State legislative elections ===
Four states and one territory held elections for their state legislatures. Partisan change only occurred in one chamber, as Democrats won control of the New Jersey Senate, which was previously tied. However, Democrats did maintain control of the Mississippi Legislature, the Louisiana Legislature, and the New Jersey General Assembly. Republicans maintained control of the Virginia legislature, bringing a post-Civil War low for the Democratic Party. The Covenant Party led by Benigno Fitial won control of the Northern Mariana Islands House of Representatives, but the Northern Mariana Islands Senate would remain in Republican control.

== Local elections ==
=== Mayoral elections ===
Some of the many major American cities that held their mayoral elections in 2003 included:

- Charlotte- Incumbent Mayor Pat McCrory (R) was re-elected.
- Chicago- Incumbent Mayor Richard M. Daley (D) was re-elected. Chicago was the most populous city to hold a mayoral election in 2003.
- Houston- Former United States Deputy Secretary of Energy Bill White (D) defeated Former Councilman Orlando Sanchez in an open seat election to succeed term-limited Mayor Lee P. Brown.
- Jacksonville- Former Chairman of the Jacksonville Transportation Authority John Peyton (R) was elected Mayor of Jacksonville in 2003.
- Philadelphia- Incumbent Mayor John F. Street (D) defeated CEO of Greater Philadelphia First Sam Katz (R) to win re-election.
- Raleigh- Incumbent Mayor Charles Meeker (D) was re-elected.
- San Francisco- San Francisco Board of Supervisors member Gavin Newsom (D) won an open seat election to succeed term-limited Mayor Willie Brown (D).
