= Referendums in Transnistria =

Referendums in Transnistria, according to the Transnistrian Constitution, are one of the lawful forms of expression of people's will.

There have been seven referendums in Transnistria since 1989. Because of strict requirements only six of these seven referendums were successful.

1. Referendum on the formation of the Pridnestrovian Moldavian Soviet Socialist Republic (PMSSR) took place in various parts of the Moldavian SSR, mostly east of the Dniester River, from December 1989 through November 1990. Turnout was 79%. 95.8% voted in favor of the creation of the PMSSR.
2. On March 17, 1991, the Soviet Union's Union-wide referendum was held on the retention of the Soviet Union in a reformed form. Although Moldova boycotted the referendum, it was observed by the authorities of Transnistria and successfully held in Transnistria. As in other parts of the Soviet Union where the referendum was held, a majority of the voters supported a reformed Union.
3. December 1, 1991, was held the first referendum on formal independence of the now-renamed Pridnestrovian Moldavian Republic (PMR) outside the Soviet Union. Voter turnout was 78%, and 97.7% voted in favor of full independence.
4. 26 March 1995, was held a referendum asking the populated about the permanence within Transnistria's borders of remaining troops from the former 14th Russian Army. More than 90% supported a stay of Russian troops in Transnistria.
5. 24 December 1995, was held the constitutional referendum on the adoption of Transnistria's new 1995 Constitution and request for accession to the Commonwealth of Independent States. 81.8% approved the new constitution which declared independence from Moldova, while 90.6% voted in favor of requesting entry to the CIS.
6. April 6, 2003 was held the constitutional referendum on the introduction of private land ownership. This was ruled invalid, since voter turnout was less than the 50% required by law.
7. September 17, 2006 was held the second independence referendum of the Pridnestrovian Moldavian Republic. Voter turnout was 78.6%, substantially more than the 50%+1 required by law to validate the referendum. The referendum asked voters:
  - Do you support the course towards the independence of Transnistria and the subsequent free association with the Russian Federation?
    Yes: 97.2% – No: 1.9% – Invalid/undecided: 0.9%
  - Do you consider it possible to renounce Transnistria's independent status and subsequently become part of the Republic of Moldova?
    Yes: 3.3% – No: 94.9% – Invalid/undecided: 1.8%
