= 2005 Armenian constitutional referendum =

- 27 November 2005

Results
Choice	Votes	%
Yes	1,411,711	94.51%
No	82,018	5.49%
Valid votes	1,493,729	98.66%
Invalid or blank votes	20,364	1.34%
Total votes	1,514,093	100.00%
Registered voters/turnout	2,317,462	65.33%

A constitutional referendum was held in Armenia on 27 November 2005. The referendum was on a series of changes to the constitution of Armenia which were backed by the international community. The official results had a high turnout and overwhelming support for the changes. However the opposition and election monitors said that there were serious irregularities with the referendum.

The referendum was nicknamed the "referendum of ghosts" by the opposition.

== Background ==
As part of Armenia's commitment on joining the Council of Europe in 2001 changes to the 1995 constitution of Armenia were required. An earlier attempt at amending it were unsuccessful at a 2003 referendum. The early drafts of a new constitution were criticised by the Venice Commission of the Council of Europe but amendments were made in September 2005 to address their objections. The new constitution was passed by the National Assembly of Armenia unanimously after the opposition parties boycotted the vote.

The changes to the constitution would transfer some powers from the President to the National Assembly, the Prime Minister and other ministers. The independence of the judiciary was meant to be strengthened by removing the President from the Council of Judges, which appoints the judges in Armenia. The amended constitution was intended to introduce more respect for human rights and permit Armenians who live overseas to gain citizenship by allowing Armenians to be citizens of more than one nation. Other changes would give the President immunity from prosecution for most offences while in office, remove the requirement for a referendum to be held on any changes to the borders and make the mayoralty of Yerevan an elected post. Most of the changes to the constitution would come into effect after the next parliamentary elections in 2007.

== Campaign ==
In order for the referendum to be successful a majority of those who voted had to support the changes and the supporters had to be at least a third of the 2.3 million registered voters of Armenia. This requirement for a third of voters to vote became the biggest issue in the referendum with most talk over whether that turnout would be reached. Opinions polls for Yerevan in July and September showed that there would only be a low turnout, with the September poll showing only 13% would definitely vote.

A coalition of 17 opposition parties came out against the changes in the constitution. They were opposed to some specific changes such as giving the president immunity and giving overseas Armenians citizenship. However their main opposition was based less on any specific clauses in the constitution, but because they said that the government which was proposing the changes was illegitimate. Their position was that the President Robert Kocharyan had come into, and stayed in, power through rigged elections. The opposition called on voters to boycott the vote, to take part in civil disobedience and tried to use the Rose Revolution in Georgia as an example. However the opposition had little access to the media and their campaign saw widespread public apathy. An opposition rally in Yerevan on the weekend before the election saw only about 1,500 people take part, while another rally on the day before the election had a participation in the hundreds.

The government campaigned in favour of the constitution and attempted to get copies of the draft constitution to every family in Armenia in the weeks before the referendum. They confidently predicted success and President Kocharyan pledged to respect the results of the referendum.

The European Union, United States and Council of Europe all backed the proposed changes to the constitution. After the changes made to the proposed draft constitution in September 2005, the Venice Commission backed the changes, and the Council of Europe urged Armenians to vote in order to show their commitment to Europe. The United States said that the changes would strengthen the institutions in Armenia. As the election neared the British Council sponsored a "Rock the Referendum" concert to try to increase voter interest.

Few international Election monitors observed the referendum, with only 12 coming from the Council of Europe. The Organization for Security and Co-operation in Europe (OSCE) did not send any observers as they said they had not received any invitation from the government of Armenia. The Armenian government's position was that the OSCE's Office for Democratic Institutions and Human Rights had no mandate to observe referendums. A local group, Choice is Yours, did arrange for around 2,000 Armenians to monitor the referendum.

== Conduct ==
On the day of the election President Kocharyan was among the people to vote and the opposition criticised him for publicly showing his 'yes' ballot paper, which they said violated the constitution. Reports on the vote said that many polling places were deserted with few people voting. However the official results showed a turnout of over 65% of the electorate with an overwhelming yes vote, thus easily meeting the required level. This turnout level was one of the highest in Armenia's post-soviet history.

The opposition said that there was massive ballot stuffing and that turnout in reality was only 16 to 21% of the electorate. The observers from the Council of Europe reported that there were serious abuses in the referendum and said that the official turnout figures did not match reality. However they did believe that the required 33% turnout level was probably met. The United States State Department called on the government to investigate abuses in the referendum while the European Union expressed concern. Neither, however, supported the protests that the opposition were calling for.

President Kocharyan described the result as "a great victory in the strengthening of democracy and the making of civil society in Armenia." The governing political parties in Armenia also described the referendum as a success and said that any problems with the referendum would not have affected the result. Some government members and supporters expressed concerns including, Hranush Kharatian, the head of the government department of ethnic minorities and religious affairs and Alvard Petrosian, a deputy from the governing Armenian Revolutionary Federation party. The head of the Central Electoral Commission certified the results but with the opposition members of the commission disagreeing.

== Results ==
Choice	Votes	%
For	1,411,711	94.51
Against	82,018	5.49
Total	1,493,729	100.00
Valid votes	1,493,729	98.66
Invalid/blank votes	20,364	1.34
Total votes	1,514,093	100.00
Registered voters/turnout	2,317,462	65.33

== Aftermath ==
The opposition held a series of rallies in the two weeks following the referendum but did not attract a large number of people confirming the largely apathetic feelings of much of the population. The first rally on the 28 November attracted five to ten thousand people but over the next two weeks the rallies gradually fizzled out.
