= 2003 Tynedale District Council election =

2003 UK local government election

Results of the 2003 Tynedale District Council election

Elections to Tynedale District Council were held on 1 May 2003. The whole council was up for election and the Conservative Party took overall control over the council.

== Election result ==
Tynedale local election result 2003
Party	Seats	Gains	Losses	Net gain/loss	Seats %	Votes %	Votes	+/−
Conservative	27			+5	51.9	48.4	13,005	
Liberal Democrats	11			+1	21.2	22.3	5,978	
Labour	9			-5	17.3	18.8	5,044	
Independent	5			-1	9.6	10.5	2,824	

10 Conservative, 2 Labour and 1 Liberal Democrat councillors were elected unopposed.

== Ward results ==
Acomb
Party	Candidate	Votes	%	±%
Labour	Jane Wrigley	289	67.5	
Conservative	Keith Laidlow	139	32.5	
Majority		150	35.0	
Turnout		428		

Allendale (2)
Party	Candidate	Votes	%	±%
Conservative	Colin Horncastle	unopposed		
Conservative	Margaret Stonehouse	unopposed		

Bellingham
Party	Candidate	Votes	%	±%
Conservative	Frank Mattinson	349	68.4	
Independent	James Brownbridge	161	31.6	
Majority		188	36.8	
Turnout		510		

Broomhaugh and Riding
Party	Candidate	Votes	%	±%
Liberal Democrats	Philip Latham	265	59.8	
Conservative	Andreas Christofides	178	40.2	
Majority		87	19.6	
Turnout		443		

Chollerton with Whittington
Party	Candidate	Votes	%	±%
Conservative	Thomas Heslop	unopposed		

Corbridge (3)
Party	Candidate	Votes	%	±%
Liberal Democrats	William Grigg	638		
Conservative	Jean Fearon	597		
Conservative	Kenneth Warwick	503		
Conservative	Jeffrey Wilkinson	487		
Liberal Democrats	Austin Winstanley	463		
Turnout		2,688		

East Tynedale
Party	Candidate	Votes	%	±%
Conservative	Fiona Hunter	267	56.6	
Labour	Paul Kelly	205	43.4	
Majority		62	13.2	
Turnout		472		

Hadrian (2)
Party	Candidate	Votes	%	±%
Liberal Democrats	Alan Sharp	545		
Conservative	Valerie Gibson	475		
Labour	Andrew Birley	206		
Turnout		1,226		

Haltwhistle (3)
Party	Candidate	Votes	%	±%
Labour	David Hardy	623		
Independent	John Watson	495		
Independent	Susan Sim	484		
Conservative	Ian Wilson	480		
Labour	Ian McMinn	471		
Turnout		2,553		

Haydon (2)
Party	Candidate	Votes	%	±%
Conservative	David Smith	336		
Independent	Stanley Mitchell	306		
Labour	Michael Thorpe	173		
Turnout		815		

Hexham Gilesgate
Party	Candidate	Votes	%	±%
Conservative	Barry Pickering	unopposed		

Hexham Hencotes (3)
Party	Candidate	Votes	%	±%
Conservative	John Lynch	482		
Conservative	Jill Soulsby	436		
Labour	Thomas Flaws	398		
Labour	Wendy Dale	395		
Independent	George Ferguson	378		
Conservative	Norman Wicks	361		
Liberal Democrats	Victor Ball	301		
Turnout		2,751		

Hexham Leazes (3)
Party	Candidate	Votes	%	±%
Liberal Democrats	Derek Kennedy	633		
Conservative	Henry Herron	581		
Liberal Democrats	Colin Moss	561		
Conservative	Maureen Milne	543		
Conservative	Michael Way	499		
Turnout		2,817		

Hexham Priestpopple (3)
Party	Candidate	Votes	%	±%
Conservative	Ingrid Whale	697		
Conservative	Matthew Donnelly	646		
Conservative	John Lambert	523		
Labour	Philip Clark	418		
Turnout		2,284		

Humshaugh and Wall
Party	Candidate	Votes	%	±%
Conservative	Alexander Kerr	unopposed		

Ovingham
Party	Candidate	Votes	%	±%
Liberal Democrats	Paul MacDonald	239	75.9	
Conservative	Clare Martell	76	24.1	
Majority		163	51.8	
Turnout		315		

Prudhoe Castle (2)
Party	Candidate	Votes	%	±%
Labour	Tony Reid	223		
Liberal Democrats	Gerald Caldwell	187		
Conservative	Allan Ford	103		
Conservative	Gary Milburn	90		
Turnout		603		

Prudhoe North (2)
Party	Candidate	Votes	%	±%
Labour	William Garrett	unopposed		
Labour	David Shaw	unopposed		

Prudhoe South (3)
Party	Candidate	Votes	%	±%
Labour	Lorna Garrett	425		
Labour	Glenn Simpson	399		
Labour	Eileen Burt	381		
Conservative	Catherine Speight	271		
Conservative	Susan Cresswell	194		
Conservative	Michael Heather	184		
Liberal Democrats	Donald Smith	114		
Turnout		1,968		

Prudhoe West (2)
Party	Candidate	Votes	%	±%
Liberal Democrats	Neil Bradbury	289		
Liberal Democrats	Donna Bradbury	285		
Labour	Jennifer McGee	232		
Labour	John Grigor	201		
Conservative	Astrid Mitchell	70		
Conservative	Tracy Warhurst-Walker	57		
Turnout		1,134		

Redesdale
Party	Candidate	Votes	%	±%
Liberal Democrats	Brian Corbett	unopposed		

Sandhoe with Dilston
Party	Candidate	Votes	%	±%
Conservative	Albert Fearon	190	60.9	
Liberal Democrats	Robert MacFarlane	122	39.1	
Majority		68	21.8	
Turnout		312		

Slaley and Hexhamshire
Party	Candidate	Votes	%	±%
Conservative	Brian Massey	343	78.9	
Liberal Democrats	John Williams	92	21.1	
Majority		251	57.8	
Turnout		435		

South Tynedale
Party	Candidate	Votes	%	±%
Conservative	William Adamson	unopposed		

Stocksfield with Mickley (3)
Party	Candidate	Votes	%	±%
Conservative	Patricia Dale	1,064		
Conservative	Michael Collins	793		
Conservative	Eileen Drew	761		
Liberal Democrats	Stuart Rowlands	367		
Liberal Democrats	Darren Levitt	349		
Turnout		3,334		

Upper North Tyne
Party	Candidate	Votes	%	±%
Conservative	Michael Walton	unopposed		

Wanney
Party	Candidate	Votes	%	±%
Conservative	Janet Somerville	unopposed		

Warden and Newbrough
Party	Candidate	Votes	%	±%
Conservative	Harold Forster	unopposed		

Wark
Party	Candidate	Votes	%	±%
Independent	Flora Hewitson	288	79.6	
Liberal Democrats	Christine Billany	74	20.4	
Majority		114	59.2	
Turnout		362		

West Tynedale
Party	Candidate	Votes	%	±%
Conservative	James Hutchinson	unopposed		

Wylam (2)
Party	Candidate	Votes	%	±%
Independent	Philip Brooks	712		
Liberal Democrats	Nicholas Appleby	454		
Labour	Jeffrey Leetham	178		
Conservative	Valerie Armstrong	135		
Conservative	Christine Hanley	95		
Turnout		1,574		
