= 2003 Rugby Borough Council election =

2003 UK local government election

Results of the 2003 Rugby Borough Council election

Elections to Rugby Borough Council were held on 1 May 2003. One third of the council seats were up for election. The council stayed under no overall control. The number of councillors for each party after the election were Conservative 18, Labour 16, Liberal Democrat 10 and Independent 4.

== Election result ==
Rugby local election result 2003
Party	Seats	Gains	Losses	Net gain/loss	Seats %	Votes %	Votes	+/−
Labour	7	0	0	0	41.2	31.4	6,793	+4.2%
Conservative	6	0	0	0	35.3	38.7	8,389	+2.9%
Liberal Democrats	3	0	0	0	17.6	26.5	5,737	-3.7%
Independent	1	0	0	0	5.9	3.4	745	-3.4%

== Ward results ==
Admirals
Party	Candidate	Votes	%	±%
Labour	Kathleen Hayter	582	45.8	
Conservative	Peter Butlin	535	42.1	
Liberal Democrats	Hilda Fletcher	155	12.2	
Majority		47	3.7	
Turnout		1,272		
Labour hold		Swing		

Benn
Party	Candidate	Votes	%	±%
Labour	Francis Whistance	573	54.4	
Liberal Democrats	James Hotten	261	24.8	
Conservative	Christopher Pacey-Day	220	20.9	
Majority		312	29.6	
Turnout		1,054		
Labour hold		Swing		

Bilton
Party	Candidate	Votes	%	±%
Conservative	David Wright	911	60.3	
Labour	Patrick Joyce	322	21.3	
Liberal Democrats	Beatrice O'Dwyer	279	18.5	
Majority		589	39.0	
Turnout		1,512		
Conservative hold		Swing		

Brownsover North
Party	Candidate	Votes	%	±%
Conservative	Carolyn Robbins	418	56.9	
Labour	Steven Birkett	175	23.8	
Liberal Democrats	Heidi Thomas	141	19.2	
Majority		243	33.1	
Turnout		734		
Conservative hold		Swing		

Brownsover South
Party	Candidate	Votes	%	±%
Labour	Claire Edwards	352	57.9	
Conservative	Kevin Taylor	185	30.4	
Liberal Democrats	Mervyn Leah	71	11.7	
Majority		167	27.5	
Turnout		608		
Labour hold		Swing		

Caldecott
Party	Candidate	Votes	%	±%
Liberal Democrats	Sue Roodhouse	788	48.2	
Conservative	Ian Smith	576	35.2	
Labour	Douglas Hall	271	16.6	
Majority		212	13.0	
Turnout		1,635		
Liberal Democrats hold		Swing		

Dunchurch and Knightlow
Party	Candidate	Votes	%	±%
Conservative	Mark Pawsey	1,076	49.7	
Liberal Democrats	Ian Morris	739	34.2	
Independent	Vaughan Owen	178	8.2	
Labour	Brenda Clarke	170	7.9	
Majority		337	15.5	
Turnout		2,163		
Conservative hold		Swing		

Earl Craven and Wolston
Party	Candidate	Votes	%	±%
Conservative	Derek Poole	1,051	62.8	
Labour	Anthony Harris	623	37.2	
Majority		428	25.6	
Turnout		1,674		
Conservative hold		Swing		

Eastlands
Party	Candidate	Votes	%	±%
Liberal Democrats	Neil Sandison	1,155	73.3	
Conservative	Paul Newsome	244	15.5	
Labour	Vasanji Chhana	176	11.2	
Majority		911	57.8	
Turnout		1,635		
Liberal Democrats hold		Swing		

Hillmorton
Party	Candidate	Votes	%	±%
Labour	Terence Deery	647	34.5	
Liberal Democrats	Richard Allanach	645	34.4	
Conservative	David Elson	581	31.0	
Majority		2	0.1	
Turnout		1,873		
Labour hold		Swing		

Leam Valley
Party	Candidate	Votes	%	±%
Conservative	Gordon Collett	628	78.5	−7.0
Liberal Democrats	Felicity Bocus	93	11.6	+11.6
Labour	John Morgan	79	9.9	−4.6
Majority		535	66.9	−4.1
Turnout		800		
Conservative hold		Swing		

New Bilton (2)
Party	Candidate	Votes	%	±%
Labour	Donald Williams	658		
Labour	Christina Avis	613		
Conservative	Caroline Wright	327		
Conservative	Sabir Yusuf	257		
Liberal Democrats	John Upstone	237		
Independent	Lilian Pallikaropoulos	208		
Liberal Democrats	Dorothy Neville	206		
Turnout		2,506		
Labour hold		Swing		

Newbold
Party	Candidate	Votes	%	±%
Labour	Ramesh Srivastava	701	55.2	
Conservative	Felipe Tejero	291	22.9	
Liberal Democrats	Christopher Thoday	278	21.9	
Majority		410	32.3	
Turnout		1,270		
Labour hold		Swing		

Overslade
Party	Candidate	Votes	%	±%
Conservative	Kamaljit Kaur	746	53.1	
Labour	Michael Hirons	660	46.9	
Majority		86	6.2	
Turnout		1,406		
Conservative hold		Swing		

Paddox
Party	Candidate	Votes	%	±%
Liberal Democrats	Glenda Allanach	689	65.4	
Conservative	Pauline Elson	230	21.8	
Labour	Benjamin Ferrett	135	12.8	
Majority		459	43.6	
Turnout		1,054		
Liberal Democrats hold		Swing		

Ryton-on-Dunsmore
Party	Candidate	Votes	%	±%
Independent	Ronald Backholler	359	68.0	+7.5
Conservative	Philip Cropper	113	21.4	+4.2
Labour	Mary Webb	56	10.6	+10.6
Majority		246	46.6	+8.4
Turnout		528		
Independent hold		Swing		
