= 2003 Wichita mayoral election =

Wichita mayoral election, 2003
- February 25, 2003 (primary); April 1, 2003 (general)
Candidate	Carlos Mayans	Bill Warren
Popular vote	28,929	8,426
Percentage	53.2%	15.5%
Mayor before election
Robert G. Knight
Republican
Elected mayor
Carlos Mayans
Republican

The 2003 Wichita mayoral election took place on April 1, 2003, to elect the mayor of Wichita, Kansas. The election was held concurrently with various other local elections, and was officially nonpartisan. It saw the election of Carlos Mayans.

== Results ==
=== Primary ===
Primary results
Party	Candidate	Votes	%
Nonpartisan	Carlos Mayans	12,130	27.9
Nonpartisan	Bill Warren	8,620	19.8
Nonpartisan	Joan Cole	7,915	18.2
Nonpartisan	Bill Gale	7,231	16.6
Nonpartisan	Lin Harris	3,008	6.9
Nonpartisan	Matt J. Goolsby	2,568	5.9
Nonpartisan	George Poulos	826	1.9
Nonpartisan	Michael Esparza	299	0.7
Nonpartisan	James A. Woomack	230	0.5
Nonpartisan	Carl Kramer	171	0.4
Nonpartisan	Kenneth Kindler	121	0.3
Nonpartisan	Martin Mork	116	0.3
Nonpartisan	Michael L. Rumford	110	0.3
Nonpartisan	Jim C. Purkey	83	0.2
Nonpartisan	King David Davis	81	0.2
Turnout		43,509	25.29

=== General election ===
General election results
Party	Candidate	Votes	%
Nonpartisan	Carlos Mayans	28,929	53.2
Nonpartisan	Bill Warren	8,426	15.5
Write-in		17,020	31.3
Turnout		54,375	26.95
