= 2003 Sedgemoor District Council election =

2003 UK local government election

Map of the results of the 2003 Sedgemoor District Council election.

The 2003 Sedgemoor District Council election took place on 1 May 2003 to elect members of Sedgemoor District Council in Somerset, England. The whole council was up for election and the Conservative Party stayed in overall control of the council.

== Election result ==
Sedgemoor local election result 2003
| Party | Seats | Gains | Losses | Net gain/loss | Seats % | Votes % | Votes | +/− |
|---|---|---|---|---|---|---|---|---|
| Conservative | 35 | | | +4 | 70.0 | 54.6 | 28,195 | |
| Labour | 14 | | | -2 | 28.0 | 21.6 | 11,142 | |
| Liberal Democrats | 1 | | | -2 | 2.0 | 19.7 | 10,186 | |
| Independent | 0 | | | 0 | 0 | 1.9 | 983 | |
| Green | 0 | | | 0 | 0 | 1.3 | 694 | |
| UKIP | 0 | | | 0 | 0 | 0.8 | 408 | |

Two Labour and one Conservative candidates were unopposed.

== Ward results ==
Axbridge
| Party | Candidate | Votes | % | ±% |
|---|---|---|---|---|
| Conservative | Elizabeth Scott | 340 | 48.6 | |
| Labour | Antony Wilson | 155 | 22.2 | |
| Liberal Democrats | John Laband | 135 | 19.3 | |
| Green | Gillian Davies | 69 | 9.9 | |
| Majority | | 185 | 26.4 | |
| Turnout | | 699 | 46.1 | |

Axe Vale
| Party | Candidate | Votes | % | ±% |
|---|---|---|---|---|
| Conservative | John Denbee | 459 | 63.8 | |
| Liberal Democrats | Elizabeth Mansfield | 164 | 22.8 | |
| UKIP | David Willis | 96 | 13.4 | |
| Majority | | 295 | 41.0 | |
| Turnout | | 719 | 43.0 | |

Berrow
| Party | Candidate | Votes | % | ±% |
|---|---|---|---|---|
| Conservative | John Lamb | 374 | 57.7 | |
| Liberal Democrats | Anthony Gore | 274 | 42.3 | |
| Majority | | 100 | 15.4 | |
| Turnout | | 648 | 34.6 | |

Brent North
| Party | Candidate | Votes | % | ±% |
|---|---|---|---|---|
| Conservative | Andrew Gilling | 406 | 75.5 | |
| Liberal Democrats | Helen Mansfield | 132 | 24.5 | |
| Majority | | 274 | 51.0 | |
| Turnout | | 538 | 32.9 | |

Bridgwater Bower (3)
| Party | Candidate | Votes | % | ±% |
|---|---|---|---|---|
| Conservative | Michael Cresswell | 435 | | |
| Labour | Bryan Gillard | 427 | | |
| Conservative | David Preece | 427 | | |
| Labour | Jillian Rees | 356 | | |
| Labour | Nigel Parker | 351 | | |
| Turnout | | 1,996 | 18.8 | |

Bridgwater Eastover (2)
| Party | Candidate | Votes | % | ±% |
|---|---|---|---|---|
| Labour | Adrian Moore | 485 | | |
| Labour | Julian Taylor | 417 | | |
| Conservative | William Cudlipp | 179 | | |
| Turnout | | 1,081 | 21.5 | |

Bridgwater Hamp (3)
| Party | Candidate | Votes | % | ±% |
|---|---|---|---|---|
| Labour | John Turner | 633 | | |
| Labour | Kathryn Pearce | 586 | | |
| Labour | Brian Smedley | 519 | | |
| Conservative | John Fulwell | 288 | | |
| Turnout | | 2,026 | 18.1 | |

Bridgwater Quantock (3)
| Party | Candidate | Votes | % | ±% |
|---|---|---|---|---|
| Conservative | Gill Slocombe | 810 | | |
| Conservative | Cyril Avent | 729 | | |
| Conservative | Barrie Crow | 667 | | |
| Liberal Democrats | Peter Johnstone | 531 | | |
| Liberal Democrats | Katherine Hall | 435 | | |
| Labour | Elaine Di Campo | 389 | | |
| Labour | Elizabeth Leavy | 358 | | |
| Turnout | | 3,919 | 31.3 | |

Bridgwater Sydenham (3)
| Party | Candidate | Votes | % | ±% |
|---|---|---|---|---|
| Labour | Graham Granter | 514 | | |
| Labour | James Munn | 472 | | |
| Labour | William Monteith | 453 | | |
| Liberal Democrats | Trevor Webster | 295 | | |
| Turnout | | 1,734 | 17.2 | |

Bridgwater Victoria (2)
| Party | Candidate | Votes | % | ±% |
|---|---|---|---|---|
| Labour | Roger Lavers | uncontested | | |
| Labour | Kenneth Richards | uncontested | | |

Burnham North (3)
| Party | Candidate | Votes | % | ±% |
|---|---|---|---|---|
| Conservative | Peter Clayton | 1,491 | | |
| Conservative | Dennis Davey | 1,412 | | |
| Conservative | Neville Jones | 1,142 | | |
| Liberal Democrats | Adrian Petoud | 756 | | |
| Labour | Stephen Lester | 450 | | |
| Turnout | | 5,251 | 40.3 | |

Burnham South (3)
| Party | Candidate | Votes | % | ±% |
|---|---|---|---|---|
| Conservative | Arthur Thorogood | 807 | | |
| Liberal Democrats | Michael Mansfield | 759 | | |
| Conservative | Lousie Parkin | 759 | | |
| Conservative | Jacqueline Richards | 697 | | |
| Liberal Democrats | Hilary Rose | 670 | | |
| Liberal Democrats | Joyce Smith | 633 | | |
| Labour | June Thomas | 293 | | |
| Turnout | | 4,618 | 35.0 | |

Cannington and Quantocks (3)
| Party | Candidate | Votes | % | ±% |
|---|---|---|---|---|
| Conservative | Lily Cartwright | 1,668 | | |
| Conservative | Kenneth Dyer | 1,655 | | |
| Conservative | David Joslin | 1,487 | | |
| Liberal Democrats | Janice Beasley | 658 | | |
| Liberal Democrats | Christopher Lloyd-Williams | 605 | | |
| Liberal Democrats | Joshua Schwieso | 554 | | |
| Turnout | | 6,627 | 44.5 | |

Cheddar and Shipham (3)
| Party | Candidate | Votes | % | ±% |
|---|---|---|---|---|
| Conservative | Dawn Hill | 1,027 | | |
| Conservative | Herbert Elliott | 987 | | |
| Conservative | Peter Downing | 897 | | |
| Liberal Democrats | John Outhwaite | 484 | | |
| Labour | Norma Scanlon | 330 | | |
| Liberal Democrats | Christina Baron | 319 | | |
| Green | Harry Mottram | 309 | | |
| Labour | Thomas Scott | 225 | | |
| Labour | Brian Corney | 211 | | |
| Turnout | | 4,789 | 33.2 | |

East Poidens
| Party | Candidate | Votes | % | ±% |
|---|---|---|---|---|
| Conservative | Duncan McGinty | 434 | 75.6 | |
| Labour | Martin Rees | 140 | 24.4 | |
| Majority | | 294 | 51.2 | |
| Turnout | | 574 | 36.2 | |

Highbridge (3)
| Party | Candidate | Votes | % | ±% |
|---|---|---|---|---|
| Labour | Derick Cooper | 583 | | |
| Labour | Jane Whitehouse | 504 | | |
| Conservative | Michael Brown | 441 | | |
| Labour | David Poole | 437 | | |
| Conservative | Beryk Rundall | 389 | | |
| Liberal Democrats | Patricia Burge | 379 | | |
| Conservative | Roger Keen | 365 | | |
| Liberal Democrats | Christopher Williams | 357 | | |
| Liberal Democrats | Paul Bolton | 251 | | |
| UKIP | Montague Lucas | 113 | | |
| UKIP | Julia Lucas | 110 | | |
| UKIP | Sydney Cox | 89 | | |
| Turnout | | 4,018 | 30.8 | |

Huntspill and Pawlett (2)
| Party | Candidate | Votes | % | ±% |
|---|---|---|---|---|
| Conservative | Jane Moreton | 681 | | |
| Conservative | Michael Herbert | 482 | | |
| Liberal Democrats | Martin Forsey | 326 | | |
| Liberal Democrats | Marilyn Wallace | 322 | | |
| Turnout | | 1,811 | 35.6 | |

King's Isle (2)
| Party | Candidate | Votes | % | ±% |
|---|---|---|---|---|
| Conservative | Derek Alder | 668 | | |
| Conservative | Norman Turner | 555 | | |
| Independent | Derrick Pedley | 427 | | |
| Green | Robert Graham | 316 | | |
| Labour | Peter Denning | 200 | | |
| Labour | Anthony Mumby | 105 | | |
| Turnout | | 2,271 | 37.5 | |

Knoll
| Party | Candidate | Votes | % | ±% |
|---|---|---|---|---|
| Conservative | Robert Filmer | 665 | 79.3 | |
| Liberal Democrats | Philippa Groves | 174 | 20.7 | |
| Majority | | 491 | 58.6 | |
| Turnout | | 839 | 45.2 | |

North Petherton (3)
| Party | Candidate | Votes | % | ±% |
|---|---|---|---|---|
| Conservative | Christopher Lang | 958 | | |
| Conservative | Anne Fraser | 922 | | |
| Conservative | John Swayne | 737 | | |
| Independent | Anthony Nicholson | 556 | | |
| Liberal Democrats | Michael Wakefield | 554 | | |
| Labour | Wendy Darch | 405 | | |
| Turnout | | 4,132 | 38.4 | |

Puriton
| Party | Candidate | Votes | % | ±% |
|---|---|---|---|---|
| Conservative | Mark Healey | uncontested | | |

Sandford
| Party | Candidate | Votes | % | ±% |
|---|---|---|---|---|
| Conservative | Ann Bown | 570 | 76.3 | |
| Labour | William Munn | 177 | 23.7 | |
| Majority | | 393 | 52.6 | |
| Turnout | | 747 | 43.9 | |

Wedmore and Mark (2)
| Party | Candidate | Votes | % | ±% |
|---|---|---|---|---|
| Conservative | Diana Bayliss | 959 | | |
| Conservative | Jessica Healey | 948 | | |
| Liberal Democrats | Rosemary Hasler | 419 | | |
| Labour | Andrew Merryfield | 378 | | |
| Turnout | | 2,704 | 42.4 | |

West Poldens
| Party | Candidate | Votes | % | ±% |
|---|---|---|---|---|
| Conservative | Stuart Kingham | 516 | 72.3 | |
| Labour | Elizabeth Stretch | 198 | 27.7 | |
| Majority | | 318 | 44.6 | |
| Turnout | | 714 | 36.6 | |

Woolavington
| Party | Candidate | Votes | % | ±% |
|---|---|---|---|---|
| Labour | Christine Lavers | 391 | 53.4 | |
| Conservative | Bridget Hobhouse | 341 | 46.6 | |
| Majority | | 50 | 6.8 | |
| Turnout | | 732 | 43.2 | |
