= 2003 Shibuya mayoral election =

Shibuya, Tokyo, Japan held a mayoral election on April 27, 2003. Kuwahara Toshitake, an independent, won.

Mayoral election 2006: Shibuya
Party	Candidate	Votes	%	±%
Independent	Kuwahara Toshitake (桑原 敏武)	25703		
Independent	Akihiro Hirata (平田 昭広)	18167		
Independent	Takako Ōsumi (大角 隆子)	17277		
Turnout		64,600	39.31	
