= 2003 Watford Borough Council election =

2003 UK local government election

Results of the 2003 Watford Borough Council election

Elections to Watford Borough Council were held on 1 May 2003. One third of the council was up for election and the Liberal Democrats gained overall control of the council from no overall control. Overall turnout was 32.05%.

After the election, the composition of the council was:

- Liberal Democrat 20
- Labour 8
- Conservative 7
- Green 1

== Council election result ==
Watford local election result 2003
Party	Seats	Gains	Losses	Net gain/loss	Seats %	Votes %	Votes	+/−
Liberal Democrats	10			+6	83.3	49.2	9,491	+5.3%
Conservative	1			0	8.3	21.4	4,136	-4.2%
Green	1			+1	8.3	8.5	1,636	+4.6%
Labour	0			-6	0	20.0	3,867	-4.2%
Independent	0			-1	0	0.4	86	-1.8%
Socialist Alliance	0			0	0	0.4	78	+0.1%

== Ward results ==
Callowland
Party	Candidate	Votes	%	±%
Green	Stephen Rackett	928	53.4	+34.3
Liberal Democrats	Paul Salter	507	29.2	−2.1
Labour	Marion Chambers	213	12.3	−20.5
Conservative	Walter Lees	89	5.1	−11.6
Majority		421	24.2	
Turnout		1,737		

Central
Party	Candidate	Votes	%	±%
Liberal Democrats	Sheila Smillie	818	54.5	+5.4
Labour	John Dowdle	389	25.9	−9.5
Conservative	Paul Jenkins	180	12.0	+1.9
Green	Faye Cullen	72	4.8	−0.6
Socialist Alliance	Peter Martindale	42	2.8	+2.8
Majority		429	28.6	+14.9
Turnout		1,501		

Holywell
Party	Candidate	Votes	%	±%
Liberal Democrats	Paul Mortimer	744	50.8	−6.1
Labour	Nigel Bell	587	40.1	+8.5
Conservative	David Ealey	93	6.3	−1.9
Socialist Alliance	Andrew O'Brien	22	1.5	−1.8
Green	David Degen	19	1.3	+1.3
Majority		157	10.7	−14.6
Turnout		1,465		

Leggatts
Party	Candidate	Votes	%	±%
Liberal Democrats	Maria Green	746	46.0	+19.0
Conservative	Patricia Lees	506	31.2	−2.7
Labour	Dilshad Basha	273	16.9	−19.1
Green	Christine Stockwell	95	5.9	+2.8
Majority		240	14.8	
Turnout		1,620		

Meriden
Party	Candidate	Votes	%	±%
Liberal Democrats	Susan Greenslade	825	51.3	+16.4
Labour	Norman Tyrwhitt	483	30.0	−7.2
Conservative	Roger Frost	168	10.4	−17.5
Independent	Jack Moss	86	5.3	+5.3
Green	Jennifer Woods	32	2.0	+2.0
Socialist Alliance	Paul Woodward	14	0.9	+0.9
Majority		342	21.3	
Turnout		1,608		

Nascot
Party	Candidate	Votes	%	±%
Conservative	Sally Punter	906	49.4	+1.6
Liberal Democrats	Timothy Wyatt	660	36.0	+5.2
Labour	Thomas Meldrum	178	9.7	+9.7
Green	Carole Skinner	89	4.9	+4.9
Majority		246	13.4	−3.6
Turnout		1,833		

Oxhey
Party	Candidate	Votes	%	±%
Liberal Democrats	Shirena Counter	1,038	68.4	+1.0
Conservative	Alan Luto	280	18.5	−0.3
Labour	Nnagbogu Akubue	142	9.4	−1.2
Green	Andrew McBean	57	3.8	+0.6
Majority		758	49.9	+1.3
Turnout		1,517		

Park
Party	Candidate	Votes	%	±%
Liberal Democrats	Jill Jenkins	928	47.5	+13.5
Conservative	Kay Solomon	832	42.6	−9.0
Labour	Manzoor Hussain	121	6.2	−4.7
Green	Elaine Edwards	72	3.7	+0.3
Majority		96	4.9	
Turnout		1,953		

Stanborough
Party	Candidate	Votes	%	±%
Liberal Democrats	Derek Scudder	945	65.7	+1.0
Conservative	Grace Cordell	243	16.9	+0.1
Labour	Mavis Tyrwhitt	216	15.0	−0.4
Green	Ian West	35	2.4	−0.7
Majority		702	48.8	+0.9
Turnout		1,439		

Tudor
Party	Candidate	Votes	%	±%
Liberal Democrats	Tariq Chohan	607	38.3	+1.8
Conservative	Richard Southern	540	34.1	+1.2
Labour	John Young	375	23.7	−3.4
Green	Clive Skinner	61	3.9	+0.5
Majority		67	4.2	+0.6
Turnout		1,583		

Vicarage
Party	Candidate	Votes	%	±%
Liberal Democrats	Shahnaz Ali	874	51.0	+19.0
Labour	Abdul Choudhrey	561	32.7	−11.8
Conservative	Thomas Needham	149	8.7	−7.4
Green	Elizabeth Cocks	129	7.5	+0.1
Majority		313	18.3	
Turnout		1,713		

Woodside
Party	Candidate	Votes	%	±%
Liberal Democrats	Alan Burtenshaw	799	60.3	−2.4
Labour	Linda Smith	329	24.8	+0.2
Conservative	Iris Powell	150	11.3	+0.8
Green	Sally Ivins	47	3.5	+1.3
Majority		470	35.5	−2.6
Turnout		1,325		
