= 2003 Rochford District Council election =

2003 UK local government election

Results of the 2003 Rochford District Council election

Elections to Rochford Council were held on 1 May 2003. One third of the council was up for election and the Conservative party stayed in overall control of the council.

After the election, the composition of the council was:

Party	Seats	±
Conservative	30	+2
Liberal Democrat	4	0
Labour	3	-1
Independent	1	-1
Hawkwell Residents	1	0

== Election result ==
Rochford local election result 2003
Party	Seats	Gains	Losses	Net gain/loss	Seats %	Votes %	Votes	+/−
Conservative	12	3	1	+2	80.0	48.7	6,685	-3.2%
Liberal Democrats	2	0	0	0	13.3	18.4	2,521	+1.1%
Labour	1	1	2	-1	6.7	22.9	3,144	-1.9%
Independent	0	0	1	-1	0	5.0	689	+3.0%
Green	0	0	0	0	0	3.5	487	+1.6%
Hawkwell Residents	0	0	0	0	0	1.4	199	-0.7%

== Ward results ==
=== Ashingdon and Canewdon ===
Ashingdon and Canewdon
Party	Candidate	Votes	%	±%
Conservative	Tracy Capon	478	53.2	
Liberal Democrats	Valerie Stanton	199	22.2	
Green	Andrew Vaughan	124	13.8	
Labour	David Lench	97	10.8	
Majority		279	31.0	
Turnout		898	25.7	
Conservative hold		Swing		

=== Barling and Sutton ===
Barling and Sutton
Party	Candidate	Votes	%	±%
Conservative	Richard Amner	216	65.1	
Labour	Kevin Salt	116	34.9	
Majority		100	30.2	
Turnout		332	23.5	
Conservative gain from Independent		Swing		

=== Downhall and Rawreth ===
Downhall and Rawreth
Party	Candidate	Votes	%	±%
Liberal Democrats	Ronald Oatham	613	74.7	
Conservative	Joan Mockford	208	25.3	
Majority		405	49.4	
Turnout		821	26.2	
Liberal Democrats hold		Swing		

=== Foulness and Great Wakering ===
Foulness and Great Wakering
Party	Candidate	Votes	%	±%
Conservative	Colin Seagers	563	47.5	
Labour	Graham Fox	517	43.6	
Liberal Democrats	Dawn Giles	105	8.9	
Majority		46	3.9	
Turnout		1,185	27.1	
Conservative hold		Swing		

=== Grange ===
Grange
Party	Candidate	Votes	%	±%
Liberal Democrats	June Lumley	442	55.7	
Conservative	Carole Weston	351	44.3	
Majority		91	11.4	
Turnout		793	28.8	
Liberal Democrats hold		Swing		

=== Hawkwell North ===
Hawkwell North
Party	Candidate	Votes	%	±%
Conservative	Maureen Starke	450	51.6	
Hawkwell Residents	Christine Mason	199	22.8	
Labour	David Thompson	100	11.5	
Liberal Democrats	Marian Smith	81	9.3	
Green	Cyril Pohl	42	4.8	
Majority		251	28.8	
Turnout		872	26.0	
Conservative hold		Swing		

=== Hawkwell South ===
Hawkwell South
Party	Candidate	Votes	%	±%
Conservative	Philip Capon	318	44.6	
Independent	Dudley Ball	276	38.7	
Labour	Sheila Downard	119	16.7	
Majority		42	5.9	
Turnout		713	22.3	
Conservative hold		Swing		

=== Hawkwell West ===
Hawkwell West
Party	Candidate	Votes	%	±%
Conservative	Derrick Stansby	374	43.4	
Labour	Myra Weir	342	39.7	
Green	Heather Johnson	146	16.9	
Majority		32	3.7	
Turnout		862	27.8	
Conservative gain from Labour		Swing		

=== Hockley Central ===
Hockley Central (2)
Party	Candidate	Votes	%	±%
Conservative	Keith Hudson	791		
Conservative	Marina McCarthy	737		
Labour	Dorothy Thompson	188		
Liberal Democrats	Keith Budden	186		
Labour	Ian Rooke	186		
Liberal Democrats	Peggy Pearse	165		
Green	Maria Tugwell	100		
Green	Gabrielle Yeadell	75		
Turnout		2,428	25.1	
Conservative hold		Swing		
Conservative hold		Swing		

=== Hullbridge ===
Hullbridge
Party	Candidate	Votes	%	±%
Conservative	Lesley Butcher	603	52.8	
Labour	Mary Stevenson	540	47.2	
Majority		63	5.6	
Turnout		1,143	21.7	
Conservative gain from Labour		Swing		

=== Lodge ===
Lodge
Party	Candidate	Votes	%	±%
Conservative	Terry Livings	369	52.3	
Liberal Democrats	Frank Hyde	336	47.7	
Majority		33	4.6	
Turnout		705	22.7	
Conservative hold		Swing		

=== Rochford ===
Rochford (2)
Party	Candidate	Votes	%	±%
Conservative	Susan Harper	455		
Labour	David Weir	412		
Labour	John Dickson	409		
Conservative	Keith Gordon	406		
Independent	Kevin Attridge	220		
Independent	David Ford	193		
Liberal Democrats	Joyce Giles	91		
Liberal Democrats	Beryl Handford	68		
Turnout		2,254	22.9	
Conservative hold		Swing		
Labour gain from Conservative		Swing		

=== Sweyne Park ===
Sweyne Park
Party	Candidate	Votes	%	±%
Conservative	Peter Savill	366	50.9	
Liberal Democrats	Mary Beckers	235	32.7	
Labour	Michael Hoy	118	16.4	
Majority		131	18.2	
Turnout		719	21.8	
Conservative hold		Swing		
