= 2003 Mole Valley District Council election =

2003 UK local government election

Results of the 2003 Mole Valley District Council election

Elections to Mole Valley Council were held on 1 May 2003. One third of the council was up for election and the council stayed under no overall control.

After the election, the composition of the council was:

- Conservative 19
- Liberal Democrat 15
- Independent 6
- Labour 1

== Election result ==
Mole Valley local election result 2003
Party	Seats	Gains	Losses	Net gain/loss	Seats %	Votes %	Votes	+/−
Conservative	8			+2	57.1	44.7	7,451	+2.4%
Liberal Democrats	6			-1	42.9	44.6	7,441	+5.4%
Labour	0			0	0	6.2	1,040	-1.1%
Independent	0			-1	0	4.1	689	-6.7%
Green	0			0	0	0.3	45	-0.1%

== Ward results ==
Ashtead Village
Party	Candidate	Votes	%	±%
Conservative	Christopher Hunt	739	42.7	+8.7
Independent	James Hiscock	689	39.8	−8.0
Liberal Democrats	Janet Jones	160	9.3	−1.2
Labour	Clive Scott	97	5.6	+0.4
Green	Jennifer Huggett	45	2.6	+0.1
Majority		50	2.9	
Turnout		1,730	39.2	

Beare Green
Party	Candidate	Votes	%	±%
Liberal Democrats	Valerie Homewood	409	71.3	
Conservative	Virginia Johnson	165	28.7	
Majority		244	42.6	
Turnout		574	38.9	

Bookham North
Party	Candidate	Votes	%	±%
Conservative	David Walker	1,198	53.3	+0.9
Liberal Democrats	Elizabeth Howarth	1,048	46.7	+2.4
Majority		150	6.6	−1.5
Turnout		2,246	50.8	

Bookham South
Party	Candidate	Votes	%	±%
Liberal Democrats	Andrew Freeman	1,150	60.7	+1.7
Conservative	Joy Wemms	656	34.6	−1.9
Labour	Deirde Diffley-Pierce	88	4.7	+0.2
Majority		494	26.1	+3.6
Turnout		1,894	43.9	

Box Hill and Headley
Party	Candidate	Votes	%	±%
Conservative	Daphne Ladell	584	65.0	
Liberal Democrats	Jane Gavey	315	35.0	
Majority		269	30.0	
Turnout		899	52.6	

Brockham, Betchworth and Buckland
Party	Candidate	Votes	%	±%
Liberal Democrats	Maurice Homewood	806	61.7	+5.9
Conservative	Patrick O'Neill	430	32.9	−6.8
Labour	Anne Helowicz	70	5.4	+0.9
Majority		376	28.8	+12.7
Turnout		1,306	38.2	

Capel, Leigh and Newdigate
Party	Candidate	Votes	%	±%
Conservative	Jean Pearson	734	66.6	−1.1
Liberal Democrats	John Watson	269	24.4	−7.9
Labour	George Helowicz	100	9.1	+9.1
Majority		465	42.2	−3.2
Turnout		1,103	35.6	

Charlwood
Party	Candidate	Votes	%	±%
Conservative	Donald Webb	287	61.6	
Liberal Democrats	Christa Longhurst	179	38.4	
Majority		108	23.2	
Turnout		466	29.8	

Dorking South
Party	Candidate	Votes	%	±%
Liberal Democrats	Stephen Cooksey	1,104	57.5	+3.9
Conservative	Penelope Mason	681	35.5	−3.1
Labour	Edmund Watts	134	7.0	−0.8
Majority		423	22.0	+7.0
Turnout		1,919	39.1	

Holmwoods
Party	Candidate	Votes	%	±%
Liberal Democrats	Michael Longhurst	848	59.6	−0.6
Conservative	Michael Foulston	441	31.0	+4.2
Labour	Malcolm Ward	135	9.5	−3.4
Majority		407	28.6	−4.8
Turnout		1,424	31.8	

Leatherhead North
Party	Candidate	Votes	%	±%
Liberal Democrats	Bridget Lewis	517	42.2	−6.6
Conservative	Duncan Mountford	364	29.7	+8.2
Labour	Michael Ward	343	28.0	−1.7
Majority		153	12.5	−6.6
Turnout		1,224	28.3	

Leith Hill
Party	Candidate	Votes	%	±%
Conservative	Neil Maltby	386	64.1	
Liberal Democrats	Steven Round	176	29.2	
Labour	Michael Macdonagh	40	6.6	
Majority		210	34.9	
Turnout		602	47.6	

Mickleham, Westhumble and Pixham
Party	Candidate	Votes	%	±%
Conservative	Patrick Tatham	470	56.6	
Liberal Democrats	Christine Lesley	328	39.5	
Labour	Keith Davis	33	4.0	
Majority		142	17.1	
Turnout		831	57.2	

Okewood
Party	Candidate	Votes	%	±%
Conservative	Vivienne Michael	316	70.5	
Liberal Democrats	Jonathan Gordon	132	29.5	
Majority		184	41.0	
Turnout		448	31.8	
