= 2003 Georgian constitutional referendum =

- 2 November 2003
- Are you for or against the reduction in the number of Georgian parliamentarians to 150 members?

Results
Choice	Votes	%
Yes	1,590,309	89.62%
No	184,209	10.38%
Valid votes	1,774,518	93.49%
Invalid or blank votes	123,466	6.51%
Total votes	1,897,984	100.00%
Registered voters/turnout	3,178,593	59.71%

A constitutional referendum was held in Georgia on 2 November 2003 alongside parliamentary elections. The constitutional changes proposed would reduce the number of seats in the next Parliament of Georgia from 235 to 150.

With almost 90% voting in favour, the changes were first implemented following the 2008 Georgian legislative election.

== Background ==
Prior to the referendum, citizens groups had gathered 218,000 signatures on a petition calling for a reduction in the number of MPs, higher than the 200,000 required for a constitutional initiative. On 3 September 2003 President Eduard Shevardnadze signed a decree approving the referendum.

== Results ==
Are you for or against the reduction in the number of Georgian parliamentarians to 150 members?

Choice	Votes	%
For	1,590,309	89.61
Against	184,209	10.39
Invalid/blank votes	123,466	–
Total	1,904,105	100
Registered voters/turnout	3,178,593	63.89
Source: Direct Democracy
