= 2003 Akron mayoral election =

- November 8, 2003
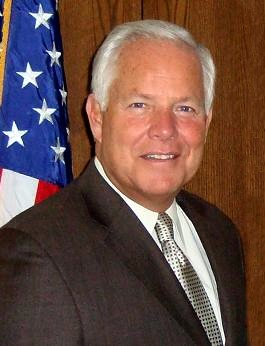

Nominee	Don Plusquellic	Bryan C. Williams
Party	Democratic	Republican
Popular vote	26,967	11,171
Percentage	70.71%	29.29%
Mayor before election
Don Plusquellic
Democratic
Elected Mayor
Don Plusquellic
Democratic

The 2003 Akron mayoral election was held on Tuesday November 4, Incumbent Democratic Mayor Don Plusquellic ran for re-election to a fifth term. He was challenged by State Representative Bryan C. Williams, the Republican nominee. Plusquellic defeated Williams in a landslide, winning 71 percent of the vote to Williams's 29 percent, as voters simultaneously rejected a ballot measure to establish mayoral term limits.

== Democratic nomination ==
Incumbent Mayor Don Plusquellic announced that he would run for re-election. He was the only Democratic candidate to file and won the nomination unopposed.

== Republican primary ==
=== Candidates ===
- Bryan C. Williams, State Representative
- Katarina Cook, attorney
- William John Price, attorney

=== Campaign ===
Williams announced that he would run for Mayor on March 29, 2003, and attacked Plusquellic for his heavy-handed management of the city. He referred to Plusquellic as a "dictator," and argued in favor of mayoral term limits. He faced two-little known opponents in the primary, and won a lukewarm endorsement of the Akron Beacon Journal, which noted that though Williams had "compil[ed] an undistinguished record in the Ohio House" and his term-limits proposal was "misguided," he was "the only real choice for Republican voters."

=== Primary results ===
Republican primary results
Party	Candidate	Votes	%
Republican	Bryan Williams	1,104	75.98%
Republican	Katarina Cook	211	14.52%
Republican	William John Price	138	9.50%
Total votes		1,453	100.00%

== General election ==
=== Campaign ===
In the general election, Williams attacked Plusquellic's record and governance of the city, posing one of the most serious threats to his re-election since he was first elected in 1987. In the closing days of the campaign, Williams shifted his focus from attacking Plusquellic to laying out his own proposals. He laid out a serious of proposals to increase spending on public services, including hiring more firefighters, and to cut taxes, but did not identify how the new services would be paid for.

Both the Akron Beacon Journal and the Plain Dealer endorsed Plusquellic over Williams. The Beacon Journal praised his "capacity to grow, driven by his curiosity, his refreshing decisiveness, his vision and passion for the city," and "strongly recommend[ed]" his re-election. The Plain Dealer noted that "Plusquellic is one reason why Akron, which is bleeding jobs like most cities in this region, has refused to give up. He simply won't surrender." The Beacon Journal criticized Williams for his "skimpy" record in the legislature, noting that he had "accomplished little" and "[h]is analysis of city affairs has been misinformed." The Plain Dealer likewise noted that, despite Williams's "bruising campaign," it was "hard to make the charges stick."

=== Results ===
2003 Akron mayoral election
Party	Candidate	Votes	%
Democratic	Don Plusquellic (inc.)	26,967	70.71%
Republican	Bryan C. Williams	11,171	29.29%
Total votes		38,138	100.00%
Democratic hold			
