= 2003 Stafford Borough Council election =

2003 UK local government election

Elections to Stafford Borough Council were held on 1 May 2003. All 59 seats on the council were up for election, with boundary changes meaning the number was reduced from 60. There were elections held in 24 wards, with a further 2 wards (Church Eaton and Milwich) uncontested. The Conservative Party gained majority control of the council after the council was under no overall control prior to the election. Overall turnout was 37.51%, with the lowest turnout (24.08%) in Coton ward and the highest (55.77%) in Seighford. As a result of the election, the new council leader was Cllr. Judith Dalgarno.

== Election result ==
Stafford local election result 2003
Party	Seats	Gains	Losses	Net gain/loss	Seats %	Votes %	Votes	+/−
Conservative	40			+17	67.8%			
Labour	14			-13	23.7%			
Liberal Democrats	5			-3	8.4%			
Independent	0			-2	0			

The total number of seats on the Council after the election was:

- Conservative Party - 40
- Labour - 14
- Liberal Democrats - 5

Sources: BBC Stafford Borough Council

== Results by ward ==
All results from Stafford Borough Council.

=== Barlaston and Oulton (2 seats) ===
Party	Candidate	Votes	%	±%
Conservative	John Fairbanks	817		
Liberal Democrats	John Russell	763		
Conservative	Philip Jones	674		
Turnout		1,443	44.29%	

=== Baswich (2 seats) ===
Party	Candidate	Votes	%	±%
Conservative	Ann Edgeller	868		
Conservative	Susan Francis	728		
Labour	Michael Evans	349		
Labour	Mellony Millichap	300		
Liberal Democrats	Paul Brett	250		
UKIP	Adrian Wood	195		
Turnout		1,463	42.47%	

=== Chartley (1 seat) ===
Party	Candidate	Votes	%	±%
Liberal Democrats	Brendan McKeown	346	50.2%	
Conservative	Christopher Walster	343	49.8%	
Turnout		694	47.86%	

=== Church Eaton (1 seat) ===
Party	Candidate	Votes	%	±%
Liberal Democrats	Barry Stamp	Election Uncontested		

=== Common (2 seats) ===
Party	Candidate	Votes	%	±%
Labour	John Kennedy	438		
Labour	William Simpson	422		
Conservative	James Eld	246		
Conservative	Carol Lee	234		
Liberal Democrats	Robert Hine	178		
UKIP	Leslie Gittins	142		
Turnout		920	29.00%	

=== Coton (2 seats) ===
Party	Candidate	Votes	%	±%
Labour	William Kemp	378		
Labour	Michael Shone	345		
Liberal Democrats	Rosemary Vance-Cotsford	155		
UKIP	Paul Gilbert	150		
Conservative	Dominic Brisby	128		
Conservative	Edith Foster	121		
Turnout		696	24.08%	

=== Eccleshall (3 seats) ===
Party	Candidate	Votes	%	±%
Conservative	Henry Butter	1134		
Conservative	John Sillito	1039		
Conservative	Ivan Jennings	925		
Independent	Gordon Dale	775		
Liberal Democrats	David Kirby	674		
Liberal Democrats	Bryan Delanchy	465		
Turnout		1,954	38.26	

=== Forebridge (2 seats) ===
Party	Candidate	Votes	%	±%
Liberal Democrats	Christine Baron	648		
Liberal Democrats	David Seary	559		
Labour	Ian Ronald	313		
Labour	Lisa Pearce	261		
Conservative	Violet Allan	198		
Conservative	Patrick Roe	187		
Turnout		1,138	35.09%	

=== Fulford (3 seats) ===
Party	Candidate	Votes	%	±%
Conservative	John Bedson	1019		
Conservative	Sydney Oldfield	913		
Conservative	Andrew Harp	828		
Liberal Democrats	Kathleen Brayford	636		
Liberal Democrats	Richard Mycock	618		
Liberal Democrats	Kenneth Brayford	599		
Labour	Michael Shaw	366		
Turnout		1,902	40.62%	

=== Gnosall and Woodseaves (3 seats) ===
Party	Candidate	Votes	%	±%
Conservative	Raymond Smith	1057		
Conservative	James Kelly	1039		
Conservative	Kenneth Williamson	1019		
Liberal Democrats	Richard Philpott	623		
Liberal Democrats	George Sunley	612		
Liberal Democrats	Robert Philpott	593		
Turnout		1,806	35.66%	

=== Haywood and Hixon (3 seats) ===
Party	Candidate	Votes	%	±%
Conservative	Jean Tabernor	999		
Conservative	Amyas Northcote	968		
Conservative	Alan Perkins	951		
Labour	John Coates	487		
UKIP	John Mosley	367		
Liberal Democrats	Timothy Hackett	364		
Liberal Democrats	Jacqueline Hemingway	349		
UKIP	Ronald Chell	342		
Labour	John Boyle	336		
Turnout		2,003	39.69%	

=== Highfields and Western Downs (3 seats) ===
Party	Candidate	Votes	%	±%
Labour	Aidan Godfrey	668		
Labour	Maureen Bowen	630		
Labour	Anthony Pearce	561		
Independent	Neil Thomas	428		
Conservative	Richard Downs	365		
Liberal Democrats	Lynda Turner	333		
Conservative	Trevor Tabernor	332		
Independent	Scott Wilson	296		
Turnout		1,462	30.64%	

=== Holmcroft (3 seats) ===
Party	Candidate	Votes	%	±%
Conservative	James Cantrill	845		
Conservative	Bryan Cross MBE	827		
Labour	Andrew Compton MBE	693		
Conservative	Isabella Davies	684		
Labour	Maureen Compton	679		
Labour	James Paton	628		
Independent	Andrew James	281		
UKIP	David Hilton	160		
Turnout		1,802	35.47%	

=== Littleworth (3 seats) ===
Party	Candidate	Votes	%	±%
Conservative	Michael Heenan	850		
Conservative	Michael Bentley	776		
Conservative	Denis Skelland	749		
Liberal Democrats	Peter Voss	642		
Labour	Anothony Welch	557		
Labour	Rosalind Kennedy	557		
Labour	Julian Thorley	503		
Liberal Democrats	John Hopkinson	464		
Liberal Democrats	Jeremy Milln	435		
Turnout		1,920	40.73	

=== Manor (3 seats) ===
Party	Candidate	Votes	%	±%
Labour	Angela Loughran	757		
Labour	Geoffrey Rowlands	686		
Labour	Patricia Rowlands	670		
Conservative	Gary Simmonds	416		
Conservative	Christopher Knapped	385		
Conservative	Paul Robinson	352		
UKIP	Carl Gilbert	243		
Liberal Democrats	Elizabeth Page	224		
Liberal Democrats	Stephanie Spiers	223		
Liberal Democrats	John Phillips	218		
Turnout		1,540	31.74%	

=== Milford (2 seat) ===
Party	Candidate	Votes	%	±%
Conservative	Francis Finlay	904		
Conservative	Trevor Reeves	808		
Liberal Democrats	Trevor Fisher	278		
Turnout		1,159	33.98%	

=== Milwich (1 seat) ===
Party	Candidate	Votes	%	±%
Conservative	Wilfred Davis	Election Uncontested		

=== Penkside (2 seats) ===
Party	Candidate	Votes	%	±%
Labour	Ralph Cooke	404		
Labour	Malcolm Millichap	354		
Conservative	Trevor Houlton	235		
Conservative	Anthony Williams	200		
Liberal Democrats	Julia Towers	131		
UKIP	Jillian Crutchley	110		
Turnout		783	28.28%	

=== Rowley (2 seats) ===
Party	Candidate	Votes	%	±%
Conservative	David Allan	662		
Conservative	Patrick Farrington	648		
Labour	Elaine Kidney	639		
Labour	John Hartshorne	552		
Liberal Democrats	Richard Hinton	231		
UKIP	Richard Hilton	145		
Turnout		1,527	43.04%	

=== Seighford (2 seats) ===
Party	Candidate	Votes	%	±%
Conservative	Mark Winnington	725		
Conservative	Raymond Sutherland	725		
Liberal Democrats	Frank James	631		
Liberal Democrats	Gillian Cox	605		
Labour	Raymond Allsop	177		
Labour	Beryl Kemp	176		
Turnout		1,585	55.77%	

=== St Michael's (2 seats) ===
Party	Candidate	Votes	%	±%
Conservative	Stanley Goodall	571		
Conservative	Linda Davies	550		
Labour	Harry Brunt	478		
Labour	Peter Sinnott	367		
Liberal Democrats	Mark Hatton	349		
Turnout		1,272	36.07%	

=== Stonefield and Christchurch (2 seats) ===
Party	Candidate	Votes	%	±%
Conservative	Joyce Farnham	718		
Conservative	Michael Leese	522		
Liberal Democrats	Peter Stevens	484		
Labour	David Smithwick	477		
Labour	Desmond Byrne	342		
Liberal Democrats	John Warren	248		
Turnout		1,474	39.99%	

=== Swynnerton (2 seats) ===
Party	Candidate	Votes	%	±%
Conservative	James Highfield	857		
Conservative	David Price	721		
Independent	Robert Simcock	469		
Labour	Diana Osbourne	332		
Turnout		1,408	39.98%	

=== Tillington (2 seats) ===
Party	Candidate	Votes	%	±%
Conservative	Peter Goodland	524		
Conservative	Adam Tedstone	518		
Labour	Stephen Moore	448		
Labour	Anthony Nixon	402		
Liberal Democrats	David Hughes	205		
Turnout		1,161	35.21%	

=== Walton (3 seats) ===
Party	Candidate	Votes	%	±%
Conservative	Phillip Leason	821		
Conservative	Michael Carey	796		
Labour	Deborah Wakefield	765		
Labour	John Beecham	672		
Conservative	Douglas Doney	666		
Labour	Roy Osborne	625		
Liberal Democrats	Janet Stevens	279		
Turnout		1,671	36.66%	

=== Weeping Cross (3 seats) ===
Party	Candidate	Votes	%	±%
Conservative	Judith Dalgarno	1,369		
Conservative	John Francis	1,153		
Conservative	Colin Wilkinson	1,113		
Labour	Michael Barber	698		
Liberal Democrats	Henry Towers	523		
UKIP	Malcolm Hurst	356		
Turnout		2,191	41.40%	
