= 2003 Stratford-on-Avon District Council election =

2003 UK local government election

Results of the 2003 Stratford-on-Avon District Council election

The 2003 Stratford-on-Avon District Council election took place on 1 May 2003 to elect members of Stratford-on-Avon District Council in Warwickshire, England. One third of the council was up for election and the Conservative Party gained overall control of the council from no overall control.

After the election, the composition of the council was:

- Conservative 27
- Liberal Democrat 22
- Independent 3
- Labour 1

== Campaign ==
Before the election the Conservatives were one seat short of having a majority on the council with 26 seats, as compared to 22 for the Liberal Democrats, 2 Labour and 3 independents. 16 seats were contested in the election with the Liberal Democrats defending the most seats.

Council tax levels were the major issue in the election with the Liberal Democrats attacking plans for a 58% increase, which they said was mostly due to waste and poor decisions by the council. However the Conservatives defended the rise, blaming it on an insufficient grant from the national government and on the previous Liberal Democrat administration for using cash balances to keep levels artificially low. The election also saw four independent candidates standing in Stratford wards in opposition to the council tax rise.

== Election result ==
The results saw the Conservatives regain control of the council, after the election saw 5 seats changes hands. They made a net gain of 1 seat at the expense of Labour who were reduced to only 1 seat on the council after losing in Southam ward. The election in Stratford Avenue and New Town saw the closest result with independent Keith Lloyd, standing in protest at council tax levels, defeating Liberal Democrat Bill Lowe by 1 vote. However the Liberal Democrats ended with the same number of seats, with their 2 gains including a surprise win in Stockton and Napton. Turnout in the election varied from a low of 27% to a high of 51%, but overall fell from 45% in 2002 to only 35%. This was despite including 3,000 voters who had used a trial e-voting internet system.

Stratford-on-Avon local election result 2003
Party	Seats	Gains	Losses	Net gain/loss	Seats %	Votes %	Votes	+/−
Liberal Democrats	9	2	2	0	56.3	45.5	9,856	+3.7
Conservative	6	2	1	+1	37.5	39.6	8,577	-3.7
Independent	1	1	1	0	6.3	10.5	2,285	+2.8
Labour	0	0	1	-1	0.0	4.1	885	-2.6
Green	0	0	0	0	0.0	0.3	66	-0.2

== Ward results ==
Alcester
Party	Candidate	Votes	%	±%
Liberal Democrats	Pamela Price	980	59.3	
Conservative	Sylvia Hyde	673	40.7	
Majority		307	18.6	
Turnout		1,653	37.1	
Liberal Democrats hold		Swing		

Bidford and Salford
Party	Candidate	Votes	%	±%
Conservative	Brian Slaughter	759	54.6	
Liberal Democrats	John Sandle	632	45.4	
Majority		127	9.2	
Turnout		1,391	27.5	
Conservative hold		Swing		

Fenny Compton
Party	Candidate	Votes	%	±%
Conservative	Chris Williams	501	67.0	+6.9
Liberal Democrats	John Insoll	247	33.0	+33.0
Majority		254	34.0	+11.8
Turnout		748	40.7	
Conservative hold		Swing		

Henley
Party	Candidate	Votes	%	±%
Conservative	Ann Haddon	652	57.9	
Liberal Democrats	Mark Edwards	474	42.1	
Majority		178	15.8	
Turnout		1,126	32.7	
Conservative hold		Swing		

Kineton
Party	Candidate	Votes	%	±%
Liberal Democrats	Louise Giblin	690	52.2	
Conservative	Richard Hurley	631	47.8	
Majority		59	4.4	
Turnout		1,321	40.5	
Liberal Democrats hold		Swing		

Shipston
Party	Candidate	Votes	%	±%
Liberal Democrats	Bob White	853	57.1	
Conservative	Stephen Gray	642	42.9	
Majority		211	14.2	
Turnout		1,495	43.0	
Liberal Democrats hold		Swing		

Southam
Party	Candidate	Votes	%	±%
Conservative	Leslie Hewer	620	42.1	
Labour	James Taylor	608	41.3	
Liberal Democrats	Charlie Williams	244	16.6	
Majority		12	0.8	
Turnout		1,472	31.4	
Conservative gain from Labour		Swing		

Stockton and Napton
Party	Candidate	Votes	%	±%
Liberal Democrats	Nigel Rock	419	62.7	+36.4
Conservative	Peter Garret	249	37.3	−6.3
Majority		170	25.4	
Turnout		668	37.5	
Liberal Democrats gain from Conservative		Swing		

Stratford Alveston
Party	Candidate	Votes	%	±%
Conservative	Vincent Seaman	749	43.7	
Liberal Democrats	Judith Riley	634	37.0	
Independent	Roy Lodge	187	10.9	
Independent	Leslie Rouch	145	8.5	
Majority		115	6.7	
Turnout		1,715	41.7	
Conservative gain from Liberal Democrats		Swing		

Stratford Avenue and New Town
Party	Candidate	Votes	%	±%
Independent	Keith Lloyd	612	35.8	
Liberal Democrats	Bill Lowe	611	35.8	
Conservative	Robert Bessell	417	24.4	
Labour	Karen Parnell	69	4.0	
Majority		1	0.0	
Turnout		1,709	34.1	
Independent gain from Liberal Democrats		Swing		

Stratford Guild and Hathaway
Party	Candidate	Votes	%	±%
Liberal Democrats	Clive Thomas	759	37.6	
Conservative	Michael Perry	631	31.3	
Independent	Roger Hatch	478	23.7	
Labour	Michael Gerrard	150	7.4	
Majority		128	6.3	
Turnout		2,018	37.9	
Liberal Democrats hold		Swing		

Stratford Mount Pleasant
Party	Candidate	Votes	%	±%
Liberal Democrats	Peter Moorse	762	60.6	
Independent	Ted Lloyd	438	34.8	
Labour	Matthew Stephens	58	4.6	
Majority		324	25.8	
Turnout		1,258	37.8	
Liberal Democrats hold		Swing		

Studley
Party	Candidate	Votes	%	±%
Liberal Democrats	Tony Cronin	820	58.2	
Conservative	Heather Wersocki	589	41.8	
Majority		231	16.4	
Turnout		1,409	30.2	
Liberal Democrats hold		Swing		

Tredington
Party	Candidate	Votes	%	±%
Conservative	Chris Saint	556	68.6	−3.3
Liberal Democrats	Ben Brabyn	255	31.4	+3.3
Majority		301	37.1	−6.7
Turnout		811	43.2	
Conservative hold		Swing		

Welford
Party	Candidate	Votes	%	±%
Liberal Democrats	Peter Barnes	647	76.7	+1.9
Conservative	Harry Cottam	196	23.3	−1.9
Majority		451	53.5	+3.9
Turnout		843	51.9	
Liberal Democrats hold		Swing		

Wellesbourne
Party	Candidate	Votes	%	±%
Liberal Democrats	David Close	829	40.8	
Conservative	Anita MacAulay	712	35.0	
Independent	Philip Coton	425	20.9	
Green	Michael Davies	66	3.2	
Majority		117	5.8	
Turnout		2,032	39.0	
Liberal Democrats gain from Independent		Swing		
