= 2003 South Oxfordshire District Council election =

2003 UK local government election

The 2003 South Oxfordshire District Council election took place on 1 May 2003 to elect members of South Oxfordshire District Council, a non-metropolitan district council in Oxfordshire, England. This was part of the wider 2003 UK local elections. The whole council was up for election with boundary changes since the last election in 1999 reducing the number of seats by 2. The Conservative Party gained overall control of the council from no overall control.

== Election result ==
The results saw the Conservatives take control from the Liberal Democrat and Labour coalition that had run the council before the election. This was the first time the Conservatives had controlled the council since 1995 and came after they made 5 gains to hold 27 of the 48 seats on the council. The Liberal Democrats lost eight seats, including the council chairman John Griffin in Crowmarsh ward and the council leader Jan Morgan. Meanwhile, Labour also lost three seats including the cabinet member for finance Nick Hards. However the Henley Residents Group gained seats, picking up all 4 seats for Henley. Overall turnout in the election was 35.13%, after voting hours had been extended in an attempt to increase turnout.

South Oxfordshire local election result 2003
Party	Seats	Gains	Losses	Net gain/loss	Seats %	Votes %	Votes	+/−
Conservative	27			+5	56.3	47.1	27,821	
Liberal Democrats	9			-8	18.8	29.3	17,291	
Labour	4			-3	8.3	11.1	6,563	
Independent	4			0	8.3	5.9	3,500	
Henley Residents Group	4			+4	8.3	5.1	3,029	
Green	0			0	0	1.5	874	

== Ward results ==
Aston Rowant
Party	Candidate	Votes	%	±%
Conservative	Dorothy Brown	530	74.5	
Liberal Democrats	Christopher Savory	105	14.8	
Labour	Timothy Savory	76	10.7	
Majority		425	59.7	
Turnout		711	38.1	

Benson (2)
Party	Candidate	Votes	%	±%
Liberal Democrats	Susan Cooper	862		
Conservative	Felix Bloomfield	791		
Liberal Democrats	Paul Booker	787		
Conservative	Patrick Loughran	554		
Turnout		2,994	38.4	

Berinsfield (2)
Party	Candidate	Votes	%	±%
Conservative	John Cotton	825		
Conservative	Philip Cross	764		
Liberal Democrats	Marc Hiles	583		
Liberal Democrats	Carole Heath-Whyte	490		
Labour	Kenneth Hall	325		
Labour	Michael Hall	229		
Turnout		3,216	39.1	

Brightwell
Party	Candidate	Votes	%	±%
Conservative	Mary Greene	521	56.9	
Liberal Democrats	Jane Fishwick	395	43.1	
Majority		126	13.8	
Turnout		916	46.0	

Chalgrove
Party	Candidate	Votes	%	±%
Liberal Democrats	David Turner	510	60.6	
Conservative	Ann Pritchard	284	33.8	
Labour	Paul Collins	47	5.6	
Majority		226	26.8	
Turnout		841	38.4	

Chiltern Woods
Party	Candidate	Votes	%	±%
Conservative	Julian Thomson	438	67.4	
Liberal Democrats	Felicity Chancellor	212	32.6	
Majority		226	34.8	
Turnout		650	34.5	

Chinnor (2)
Party	Candidate	Votes	%	±%
Conservative	Linda Cameron	688		
Independent	Patricia Haywood	523		
Conservative	David Heaven	513		
Independent	Martin Wright	509		
Independent	Eric Stanley	227		
Labour	Julie Marfleet	180		
Liberal Democrats	Peter Cockayne	151		
Turnout		2,791	32.5	

Cholsey and Wallingford South (2)
Party	Candidate	Votes	%	±%
Conservative	Patricia Dawe	727		
Conservative	Andrea Leadsom	682		
Liberal Democrats	Janet Morgan	671		
Liberal Democrats	Josephine Clyde	628		
Turnout		2,708	35.2	

Crowmarsh
Party	Candidate	Votes	%	±%
Conservative	Mark Jennings	402	53.7	
Liberal Democrats	John Griffin	346	46.3	
Majority		56	7.4	
Turnout		748	41.7	

Didcot All Saints (2)
Party	Candidate	Votes	%	±%
Conservative	John Flood	552		
Independent	Sara Davidson	438		
Conservative	Alan Thompson	419		
Labour	Mark Fysh	391		
Labour	Shirley Brown	381		
Liberal Democrats	Emma Beszant	204		
Turnout		2,385	31.9	

Didcot Ladygrove (3)
Party	Candidate	Votes	%	±%
Conservative	William Service	509		
Conservative	Colin Daukes	498		
Conservative	Marcus Harris	478		
Liberal Democrats	Jennifer Parry	473		
Liberal Democrats	Andrew Jones	468		
Labour	Nicholas Hards	435		
Liberal Democrats	Anthony Worgan	420		
Labour	Philippa Giaretta	409		
Labour	William Atkinson	402		
Turnout		4,092	26.1	

Didcot Northbourne (2)
Party	Candidate	Votes	%	±%
Labour	Michael McNulty	416		
Labour	David Giaretta	388		
Conservative	Roger Jeffreys	265		
Conservative	Roger Hawlor	261		
Liberal Democrats	Miranda Jennings	172		
Turnout		1,502	21.0	

Didcot Park (2)
Party	Candidate	Votes	%	±%
Labour	Margaret Davies	665		
Labour	Eleanor Hards	630		
Conservative	Marie Flood	480		
Conservative	Lyndon Elias	442		
Liberal Democrats	Lee Thacker	197		
Green	David Brooks-Saxl	169		
Turnout		2,583	30.9	

Forest Hill and Holton
Party	Candidate	Votes	%	±%
Liberal Democrats	Patricia Purse	585	66.5	
Conservative	John Walsh	295	33.5	
Majority		290	33.0	
Turnout		880	37.8	

Garsington
Party	Candidate	Votes	%	±%
Liberal Democrats	Ann Tomline	471	60.4	
Conservative	Michael Belcher	309	39.6	
Majority		162	20.8	
Turnout		780	35.7	

Goring (2)
Party	Candidate	Votes	%	±%
Conservative	Elizabeth Ducker	1,222		
Conservative	Pearl Slatter	1,117		
Liberal Democrats	Alice Harrison	640		
Liberal Democrats	Caroline Wardle	590		
Green	James Norman	309		
Turnout		3,878	45.3	

Great Milton
Party	Candidate	Votes	%	±%
Liberal Democrats	John Nowell-Smith	419	46.5	
Conservative	Frank Nixey	333	36.9	
Labour	Malcolm Newdick	92	10.2	
Green	Alistair Morris	58	6.4	
Majority		86	9.6	
Turnout		902	44.2	

Hagbourne
Party	Candidate	Votes	%	±%
Conservative	Patrick Greene	662	68.4	
Liberal Democrats	Jancis Smith	203	21.0	
Labour	Jeremy Goff	103	10.6	
Majority		459	47.4	
Turnout		968	46.6	

Henley North (2)
Party	Candidate	Votes	%	±%
Henley Residents Group	Kenneth Arlett	779		
Henley Residents Group	Gillian Zakss	710		
Conservative	Nigel Spencer-Jones	621		
Conservative	Bruce Harrison	563		
Green	Aidan Carlisle	142		
Liberal Democrats	Peter Pinfield	142		
Turnout		2,957	35.1	

Henley South (2)
Party	Candidate	Votes	%	±%
Henley Residents Group	Terry Buckett	895		
Henley Residents Group	Barry Wood	645		
Conservative	Alan Rooke	439		
Conservative	Anthony Lane	417		
Liberal Democrats	Noel Snell	339		
Green	Susan Miles	145		
Turnout		2,880	35.2	

Sandford
Party	Candidate	Votes	%	±%
Liberal Democrats	John Stimson	275	45.8	
Conservative	Rolien Tremain	208	34.7	
Labour	William Atkinson	66	11.0	
Green	David Scott	51	8.5	
Majority		67	11.1	
Turnout		600	28.8	

Shiplake (2)
Party	Candidate	Votes	%	±%
Conservative	Edward Rudge	973		
Conservative	Malcolm Leonard	945		
Liberal Democrats	Emily Cooper	339		
Liberal Democrats	David Curl	287		
Turnout		2,544	35.6	

Sonning Common (2)
Party	Candidate	Votes	%	±%
Conservative	Donald Naish	983		
Conservative	Henry Kemp	908		
Liberal Democrats	Mary Martyn-Johns	399		
Liberal Democrats	Peter Wardle	335		
Turnout		2,625	33.1	

Thame North (2)
Party	Candidate	Votes	%	±%
Liberal Democrats	David Bretherton	526		
Conservative	Patrick Welply	471		
Liberal Democrats	Jeneva Paul	418		
Conservative	Nicholas Carter	416		
Labour	Euan Aitken	222		
Labour	Christopher Chandler	201		
Turnout		2,254	27.5	

Thame South (2)
Party	Candidate	Votes	%	±%
Independent	Ann Midwinter	825		
Conservative	David Dodds	642		
Labour	Mary Stiles	566		
Conservative	Ana Choudhury	460		
Turnout		2,493	33.7	

Wallingford North (2)
Party	Candidate	Votes	%	±%
Independent	Denis Strange	978		
Conservative	Nigel Moor	607		
Liberal Democrats	Norah Laurie	581		
Conservative	John Cohen	363		
Turnout		2,529	35.4	

Watlington (2)
Party	Candidate	Votes	%	±%
Conservative	Ian Mann	835		
Conservative	David Sloan	803		
Liberal Democrats	Jane Fleming	741		
Liberal Democrats	Barbara Snell	617		
Turnout		2,996	40.0	

Wheatley (2)
Party	Candidate	Votes	%	±%
Liberal Democrats	Roger Bell	674		
Liberal Democrats	Sarah Gray	638		
Conservative	John Hamer	566		
Conservative	Diana Ludlow	487		
Labour	Matthew Andrews	184		
Labour	Daniel Ferrett	155		
Turnout		2,704	33.2	

Woodcote
Party	Candidate	Votes	%	±%
Conservative	Christopher Quinton	553	58.1	
Liberal Democrats	Robin Peirce	398	41.9	
Majority		155	16.2	
Turnout		951	49.3	
