= New Democratic Party of Prince Edward Island candidates in the 2003 Prince Edward Island provincial election =

The Island New Democrats are one of the three major political parties in Prince Edward Island. The party ran 24 candidates in the 2003 provincial election. The leader of the party at the time of the election was Gary Robichaud.

== Candidates ==
- Leona Arsenault (Evangeline-Miscouche)
- Ken Bingham (Park Corner-Oyster Bed)
- Nicholas Boragina, Jr. (Parkdale-Belvedere)
- J'Nan Brown (Charlottetown-Rochford Square)
- Lorne Cudmore (Montague-Kilmuir)
- Jane Dunphy (Georgetown-Baldwin's Road)
- Miranda Ellis (Crapaud-Hazel Grove)
- Gerard Gallant (Stanhope-East Royalty)
- Paulette Halupa (St. Eleanors-Summerside)
- Donna Hardy (Alberton-Miminegash)
- Marlene Hunt (North River-Rice Point)
- George S. Hunter (Kensington-Malpeque)
- Ronald G. Kelly (Sherwood-Hillsborough)
- Ed Kilfoil (West Point-Bloomfield)
- Jane MacNeil (Glen Stewart-Bellevue Cove)
- Michael Page (Belfast-Pownal Bay)
- Reg Pendergast (Tignish-Deblois)
- Edith Perry (Murray River-Gaspereaux)
- Robert Perry (Tracadie-Fort Augustus)
- Teresa Peters (Charlottetown-Spring Park)
- Kevin Roach (Charlottetown-Kings Square)
- Peter Robinson (Cascumpec-Grand River)
- James Rodd (Borden-Kinkora)
