= 2003 Sedgefield Borough Council election =

Local election in England

Results of the 2003 Sedgefield Borough Council elections

Elections to Sedgefield Borough Council were held on 1 May 2003. The whole council was up for election with boundary changes since the last election in 1999. The Labour Party stayed in overall control of the council.

== Election result ==
Sedgefield local election result 2003
| Party | Seats | Gains | Losses | Net gain/loss | Seats % | Votes % | Votes | +/− |
|---|---|---|---|---|---|---|---|---|
| Labour | 35 | | | -7 | 70.0 | 56.7 | 29,615 | |
| Independent | 7 | | | +3 | 14.0 | 21.2 | 11,096 | |
| Liberal Democrats | 7 | | | +4 | 14.0 | 15.4 | 8,046 | |
| Conservative | 1 | | | +1 | 2.0 | 4.8 | 2,493 | |
| Socialist Labour | 0 | | | 0 | 0.0 | 1.3 | 705 | |
| BNP | 0 | | | 0 | 0.0 | 0.6 | 313 | |

12 Labour candidates were unopposed.

== Ward results ==
Bishop Middleham & Cornforth (2)
| Party | Candidate | Votes | % | ±% |
|---|---|---|---|---|
| Labour | Alan Hodgson | unopposed | | |
| Labour | Marie Predki | unopposed | | |

Broom (3)
| Party | Candidate | Votes | % | ±% |
|---|---|---|---|---|
| Labour | George Morgan | 874 | | |
| Labour | David Newell | 872 | | |
| Labour | Brian Meek | 848 | | |
| Socialist Labour | Brian Gibson | 705 | | |
| Turnout | | 3,299 | | |

Byerley (2)
| Party | Candidate | Votes | % | ±% |
|---|---|---|---|---|
| Liberal Democrats | James Huntington | 1,033 | | |
| Liberal Democrats | Gareth Howe | 865 | | |
| Labour | Vernon Chapman | 387 | | |
| Labour | John Bowman | 316 | | |
| Turnout | | 2,601 | | |

Chilton (3)
| Party | Candidate | Votes | % | ±% |
|---|---|---|---|---|
| Labour | Brian Avery | unopposed | | |
| Labour | Thomas Forrest | unopposed | | |
| Labour | Christine Potts | unopposed | | |

Ferryhill (3)
| Party | Candidate | Votes | % | ±% |
|---|---|---|---|---|
| Labour | Kathleen Conroy | unopposed | | |
| Labour | James Higgin | unopposed | | |
| Labour | Ronald Patchett | unopposed | | |

Fishburn & Old Trimdon (3)
| Party | Candidate | Votes | % | ±% |
|---|---|---|---|---|
| Labour | John Burton | unopposed | | |
| Labour | Kester Noble | unopposed | | |
| Labour | Terence Ward | unopposed | | |

Greenfield Middridge (3)
| Party | Candidate | Votes | % | ±% |
|---|---|---|---|---|
| Labour | Vincent Crosby | 848 | | |
| Labour | Brian Hall | 799 | | |
| Independent | June Croft | 551 | | |
| Labour | Gloria Wills | 545 | | |
| Independent | Kevin Cox | 518 | | |
| Independent | Terence Paylor | 510 | | |
| Turnout | | 3,771 | | |

Low Spennymoor & Tudhoe Grange (3)
| Party | Candidate | Votes | % | ±% |
|---|---|---|---|---|
| Labour | Andrew Gray | 1,193 | | |
| Labour | Andrew Smith | 1,130 | | |
| Labour | John Khan | 1,033 | | |
| Liberal Democrats | Andrew Roxby | 884 | | |
| Turnout | | 4,240 | | |

Middlestone (3)
| Party | Candidate | Votes | % | ±% |
|---|---|---|---|---|
| Liberal Democrats | Kevin Thompson | 1,022 | | |
| Labour | William Waters | 919 | | |
| Liberal Democrats | Christine Sproat | 888 | | |
| Labour | Christine Kennedy | 840 | | |
| Labour | Alexander Hawkes | 741 | | |
| Turnout | | 4,410 | | |

Neville & Simpasture (3)
| Party | Candidate | Votes | % | ±% |
|---|---|---|---|---|
| Labour | John Moran | 1,021 | | |
| Labour | William Blenkinsopp | 993 | | |
| Labour | John Piggott | 975 | | |
| BNP | Justin Thornton | 229 | | |
| Turnout | | 3,218 | | |

New Trimdon & Trimdon Grange
| Party | Candidate | Votes | % | ±% |
|---|---|---|---|---|
| Labour | Lucy Howels | unopposed | | |

Sedgefield (3)
| Party | Candidate | Votes | % | ±% |
|---|---|---|---|---|
| Independent | James Wayman | 1,209 | | |
| Labour | John Robinson | 1,024 | | |
| Conservative | David Brown | 987 | | |
| Conservative | Patricia Waller | 936 | | |
| Labour | Linda Byrne | 879 | | |
| Labour | Maxine Robinson | 861 | | |
| Turnout | | 5,896 | | |

Shafto St Mary's (3)
| Party | Candidate | Votes | % | ±% |
|---|---|---|---|---|
| Labour | Angela Fleming | 866 | | |
| Labour | Robert Fleming | 849 | | |
| Labour | Malcolm Iveson | 822 | | |
| Independent | Alison Palmer | 604 | | |
| Independent | Lileen Cuthbertson | 541 | | |
| Independent | David Dobson | 521 | | |
| Turnout | | 4,203 | | |

Spennymoor (3)
| Party | Candidate | Votes | % | ±% |
|---|---|---|---|---|
| Liberal Democrats | Benjamin Ord | 1,207 | | |
| Liberal Democrats | Martin Jones | 927 | | |
| Liberal Democrats | George Scott | 869 | | |
| Labour | Anne Mumford | 768 | | |
| Labour | John Plews | 633 | | |
| Labour | John Parkin | 519 | | |
| Turnout | | 4,923 | | |

Sunnydale (2)
| Party | Candidate | Votes | % | ±% |
|---|---|---|---|---|
| Independent | Ina Smith | 930 | | |
| Independent | Lorraine Smith | 863 | | |
| Labour | Allan Walker | 538 | | |
| Labour | James Younghusband | 456 | | |
| Turnout | | 2,787 | | |

Thickley (2)
| Party | Candidate | Votes | % | ±% |
|---|---|---|---|---|
| Independent | David Hancock | 968 | | |
| Independent | John Smith | 737 | | |
| Labour | Brian Stephens | 516 | | |
| Labour | Frank Timmiss | 381 | | |
| BNP | Janine Thornton-Browne | 84 | | |
| Turnout | | 2,686 | | |

Tudhoe (2)
| Party | Candidate | Votes | % | ±% |
|---|---|---|---|---|
| Labour | Barbara Graham | 804 | | |
| Labour | Agnes Armstrong | 790 | | |
| Liberal Democrats | Marjorie Gordon | 351 | | |
| Conservative | Matthew Miller | 243 | | |
| Turnout | | 2,188 | | |

West (3)
| Party | Candidate | Votes | % | ±% |
|---|---|---|---|---|
| Labour | George Gray | 723 | | |
| Independent | Enid Paylor | 707 | | |
| Labour | Michael Dalton | 683 | | |
| Independent | Margaret Crabtree | 666 | | |
| Labour | Maud Gray | 638 | | |
| Independent | Lynn Atkinson | 615 | | |
| Turnout | | 4,032 | | |

Woodham (3)
| Party | Candidate | Votes | % | ±% |
|---|---|---|---|---|
| Labour | Alan Gray | 995 | | |
| Labour | Keith Henderson | 796 | | |
| Labour | Barbara Clare | 740 | | |
| Independent | Sandra Haigh | 470 | | |
| Independent | Malcolm Cannings | 362 | | |
| Conservative | Geoffrey Crass | 327 | | |
| Independent | Alison Jewkes | 324 | | |
| Turnout | | 4,014 | | |
