= 2003 West Lindsey District Council election =

English local election

Elections to West Lindsey District Council were held on 1 May 2003. One third of the council was up for election and the council stayed under no overall control.

After the election, the composition of the council was:

- Conservative 17
- Liberal Democrat 13
- Independent 6
- Labour 1

== Election result ==
West Lindsey local election result 2003
Party	Seats	Gains	Losses	Net gain/loss	Seats %	Votes %	Votes	+/−
Conservative	6	4	0	+4	50.0	38.0	4,194	-4.6%
Liberal Democrats	3	0	1	-1	25.0	26.6	2,937	-5.3%
Independent	3	0	1	-1	25.0	20.8	2,296	+9.4%
Labour	0	0	2	-2	0	14.2	1,571	+0.1%
Green	0	0	0	0	0	0.3	28	+0.3%

One Conservative candidate was unopposed.

== Ward results ==
Caistor
Party	Candidate	Votes	%	±%
Independent	Alan Caine	563	59.8	+12.6
Conservative	Peter O'Leary	300	31.9	−7.4
Labour	Tara-Louise Burghardt	78	8.3	−2.3
Majority		263	27.9	+20.0
Turnout		941	37.1	+6.1
Independent hold		Swing		

Gainsborough East
Party	Candidate	Votes	%	±%
Liberal Democrats	Kristan Smith	582	73.6	+16.8
Conservative	John Otter	209	26.4	+12.2
Majority		373	47.2	+14.4
Turnout		791	18.0	+0.8
Liberal Democrats hold		Swing		

Gainsborough North
Party	Candidate	Votes	%	±%
Conservative	Gillian Bardsley	539	42.7	+12.2
Liberal Democrats	Denise Harrison-Moore	390	30.9	−2.3
Labour	Triloka Mehrotra	334	26.4	−9.9
Majority		149	11.8	
Turnout		1,263	25.8	+3.3
Conservative gain from Liberal Democrats		Swing		

Gainsborough South-West
Party	Candidate	Votes	%	±%
Liberal Democrats	Judith Rainsforth	544	64.9	+12.2
Independent	Paul Howitt-Cowan	196	23.4	+23.4
Conservative	William Morgan	98	11.7	−11.2
Majority		348	41.5	+13.2
Turnout		838	25.7	+2.5
Liberal Democrats hold		Swing		

Kelsey
Party	Candidate	Votes	%	±%
Conservative	Charles Strange	unopposed		
Conservative hold		Swing		

Lea
Party	Candidate	Votes	%	±%
Independent	Kevin Whaley	361	47.1	
Liberal Democrats	Ian Parsons	261	34.1	
Conservative	Stephen Beer	144	18.8	
Majority		100	13.0	
Turnout		766	44.3	
Independent hold		Swing		

Middle Rasen
Party	Candidate	Votes	%	±%
Liberal Democrats	Gary Fenwick	455	54.6	−18.5
Conservative	Alfred Jones	257	30.8	+3.9
Independent	Lynda Vernam	93	11.2	+11.2
Green	Christopher Padley	28	3.4	+3.4
Majority		198	23.8	−22.4
Turnout		833	44.8	+8.7
Liberal Democrats hold		Swing		

Saxilby
Party	Candidate	Votes	%	±%
Conservative	Sarah Anyan-Needham	539	50.7	+16.8
Labour	Catherine Dobson	524	49.3	+37.5
Majority		15	1.4	
Turnout		1,063	28.8	−10.3
Conservative gain from Labour		Swing		

Scotter
Party	Candidate	Votes	%	±%
Conservative	Christopher Underwood-Frost	920	74.3	+5.7
Liberal Democrats	Andrew Heathorn	319	25.7	−5.7
Majority		601	48.6	+11.4
Turnout		1,239	36.5	+4.2
Conservative hold		Swing		

Torksey
Party	Candidate	Votes	%	±%
Conservative	Stuart Kinch	614	61.4	
Liberal Democrats	Susan Bartle	386	38.6	
Majority		228	22.8	
Turnout		1,000	48.4	
Conservative gain from Independent		Swing		

Welton
Party	Candidate	Votes	%	±%
Independent	Malcolm Parish	1,083	80.0	+80.0
Labour	Philip Huckin	270	20.0	+12.7
Majority		813	60.0	
Turnout		1,353	33.6	−7.1
Independent hold		Swing		

Yarborough
Party	Candidate	Votes	%	±%
Conservative	Owen Bierley	574	61.1	+12.8
Labour	John Indian	365	38.9	−12.8
Majority		209	22.2	+18.8
Turnout		939	48.1	+11.1
Conservative gain from Labour		Swing		
