= 2003 Tandridge District Council election =

2003 UK local government election

Map of the results of the 2003 Tandridge District Council election. Conservatives in blue, Liberal Democrats in yellow, Labour in red and independent in light grey. Wards in dark grey were not contested in 2003.

The 2003 Tandridge District Council election took place on 1 May 2003 to elect members of Tandridge District Council in Surrey, England. One third of the council was up for election and the Conservative Party stayed in overall control of the council.

After the election, the composition of the council was:

- Conservative 28
- Liberal Democrat 10
- Labour 3
- Independent 1

== Election result ==
Overall turnout at the election was 39.33%.

Tandridge local election result 2003
| Party | Seats | Gains | Losses | Net gain/loss | Seats % | Votes % | Votes | +/− |
|---|---|---|---|---|---|---|---|---|
| Conservative | 10 | 0 | 1 | -1 | 62.5 | 49.5 | 9,886 | -0.6% |
| Liberal Democrats | 4 | 0 | 0 | 0 | 25.0 | 37.7 | 7,518 | +2.0% |
| Labour | 1 | 0 | 0 | 0 | 6.3 | 6.7 | 1,338 | -2.9% |
| Independent | 1 | 1 | 0 | +1 | 6.3 | 2.6 | 524 | +0.3% |
| UKIP | 0 | 0 | 0 | 0 | 0 | 3.4 | 687 | +1.6% |

== Ward results ==
Bletchingley and Nuffield
| Party | Candidate | Votes | % | ±% |
|---|---|---|---|---|
| Conservative | Christopher Hoskins | 841 | 61.1 | +3.9 |
| Liberal Democrats | Richard Fowler | 431 | 31.3 | −3.5 |
| Labour | Hubert Cockerham | 105 | 7.6 | −0.5 |
| Majority | | 410 | 29.8 | +7.4 |
| Turnout | | 1,377 | 31.5 | |
| Conservative hold | | Swing | | |

Burstow, Horne and Outwood
| Party | Candidate | Votes | % | ±% |
|---|---|---|---|---|
| Conservative | Diana Brown | 734 | 59.5 | +4.7 |
| Liberal Democrats | John Brock | 500 | 40.5 | +1.9 |
| Majority | | 234 | 19.0 | +2.8 |
| Turnout | | 1,234 | 28.6 | |
| Conservative hold | | Swing | | |

Chaldon
| Party | Candidate | Votes | % | ±% |
|---|---|---|---|---|
| Conservative | Ian Chaplin | 364 | 68.8 | |
| Liberal Democrats | Juanita Lopez | 165 | 31.2 | |
| Majority | | 199 | 37.6 | |
| Turnout | | 529 | 37.7 | |
| Conservative hold | | Swing | | |

Dormansland and Felcourt
| Party | Candidate | Votes | % | ±% |
|---|---|---|---|---|
| Conservative | Robert Bisset | 623 | 60.3 | +1.1 |
| Liberal Democrats | Mavis Tettmar | 410 | 39.7 | +3.5 |
| Majority | | 213 | 20.6 | −2.4 |
| Turnout | | 1,033 | 36.1 | |
| Conservative hold | | Swing | | |

Felbridge
| Party | Candidate | Votes | % | ±% |
|---|---|---|---|---|
| Conservative | Nicholas Weston | 379 | 71.0 | |
| Liberal Democrats | Robert O'Brien | 155 | 29.0 | |
| Majority | | 224 | 42.0 | |
| Turnout | | 534 | 35.0 | |
| Conservative hold | | Swing | | |

Godstone
| Party | Candidate | Votes | % | ±% |
|---|---|---|---|---|
| Conservative | Hamish Beaton | 878 | 52.9 | +6.8 |
| Liberal Democrats | Vivienne Cluff | 681 | 41.0 | −6.5 |
| Labour | Maxine Mathews | 102 | 6.1 | −0.4 |
| Majority | | 197 | 11.9 | |
| Turnout | | 1,661 | 37.9 | |
| Conservative hold | | Swing | | |

Harestone
| Party | Candidate | Votes | % | ±% |
|---|---|---|---|---|
| Conservative | Beverley Connolly | 656 | 54.2 | +2.1 |
| Liberal Democrats | David Martin | 555 | 45.8 | +1.8 |
| Majority | | 101 | 8.4 | +0.3 |
| Turnout | | 1,211 | 41.9 | |
| Conservative hold | | Swing | | |

Limpsfield
| Party | Candidate | Votes | % | ±% |
|---|---|---|---|---|
| Conservative | Colin Hall | 697 | 60.2 | −5.8 |
| Liberal Democrats | Mark Wilson | 410 | 35.4 | +6.1 |
| UKIP | Jeremy Marsh | 51 | 4.4 | +4.4 |
| Majority | | 287 | 24.8 | −11.9 |
| Turnout | | 1,158 | 41.6 | |
| Conservative hold | | Swing | | |

Lingfield and Crowhurst
| Party | Candidate | Votes | % | ±% |
|---|---|---|---|---|
| Liberal Democrats | Anthony Dalrymple | 822 | 52.9 | +8.0 |
| Conservative | Michael Clark | 671 | 43.2 | −6.7 |
| Labour | James Bridge | 60 | 3.9 | −1.3 |
| Majority | | 151 | 9.7 | |
| Turnout | | 1,433 | 51.6 | |
| Liberal Democrats hold | | Swing | | |

Oxted North and Tandridge (2)
| Party | Candidate | Votes | % | ±% |
|---|---|---|---|---|
| Conservative | Martin Fisher | 891 | | |
| Conservative | David Weightman | 885 | | |
| Liberal Democrats | Matthew Griffiths | 589 | | |
| Liberal Democrats | John Curtin | 588 | | |
| UKIP | David Eardley | 213 | | |
| Turnout | | 3,166 | 40.5 | |
| Conservative hold | | Swing | | |
| Conservative hold | | Swing | | |

Oxted South
| Party | Candidate | Votes | % | ±% |
|---|---|---|---|---|
| Labour | Robin Harling | 840 | 40.9 | +5.5 |
| Conservative | Edward Chater | 670 | 32.6 | −6.9 |
| Liberal Democrats | Ceri Lewis | 308 | 15.0 | +1.2 |
| UKIP | Anthony Stone | 236 | 11.5 | +0.2 |
| Majority | | 170 | 8.3 | |
| Turnout | | 2,054 | 49.2 | |
| Labour hold | | Swing | | |

Portley
| Party | Candidate | Votes | % | ±% |
|---|---|---|---|---|
| Liberal Democrats | Christopher Botten | 635 | 58.5 | |
| Conservative | Michael Cooper | 451 | 41.5 | |
| Majority | | 184 | 17.0 | |
| Turnout | | 1,086 | 37.0 | |
| Liberal Democrats hold | | Swing | | |

Tatsfield and Titsey
| Party | Candidate | Votes | % | ±% |
|---|---|---|---|---|
| Independent | Robert David | 524 | 56.7 | |
| Conservative | Christina Fry | 393 | 42.5 | |
| Liberal Democrats | Richard Mascall | 7 | 0.8 | |
| Majority | | 131 | 14.2 | |
| Turnout | | 924 | 64.0 | |
| Independent gain from Conservative | | Swing | | |

Valley
| Party | Candidate | Votes | % | ±% |
|---|---|---|---|---|
| Liberal Democrats | Alexandra Caudle | 554 | 52.6 | |
| Conservative | Philip Mortimore | 269 | 25.5 | |
| Labour | Niven Matlock | 231 | 21.9 | |
| Majority | | 285 | 27.1 | |
| Turnout | | 1,054 | 38.2 | |
| Liberal Democrats hold | | Swing | | |

Warlingham East, Chelsham and Farleigh
| Party | Candidate | Votes | % | ±% |
|---|---|---|---|---|
| Liberal Democrats | Ashley Burridge | 708 | 51.3 | +4.7 |
| Conservative | Margaret Frankcom | 484 | 35.1 | −2.9 |
| UKIP | Martin Haley | 187 | 13.6 | +6.4 |
| Majority | | 224 | 16.2 | +7.6 |
| Turnout | | 1,379 | 35.1 | |
| Liberal Democrats hold | | Swing | | |
