= 2003 Waveney District Council election =

2003 UK local government election

Map of the results

The 2003 Waveney Council election took place on 1 May 2003 to elect members of Waveney District Council in Suffolk, England. One third of the council was up for election and the council stayed under no overall control.

After the election, the composition of the council was:

- Conservative 21
- Labour 19
- Independent 5
- Liberal Democrat 3

== Election result ==
2003 Waveney District Council election
Party	This election				Full council			This election		
Party	Candidates	Seats	Net	Seats %	Other	Total	Total %	Votes	Votes %	+/−
Conservative	{{{candidates}}}	8	Steady	50.0	13	21	43.8	7,420	37.4	+5.6
Labour	{{{candidates}}}	5	▼2	31.3	14	19	39.6	6,214	31.3	-14.4
Independent	{{{candidates}}}	2	▲2	12.5	3	5	10.4	1,296	6.5	+1.0
Liberal Democrats	{{{candidates}}}	1	Steady	6.3	2	3	6.3	3,230	16.3	+2.2
Green	{{{candidates}}}	0	Steady	0.0	0	0	0.0	1,361	6.9	+5.2
UKIP	{{{candidates}}}	0	Steady	0.0	0	0	0.0	258	1.3	+0.8
Socialist Alliance	{{{candidates}}}	0	Steady	0.0	0	0	0.0	59	0.3	-0.3

== Ward results ==
Beccles North
Party	Candidate	Votes	%	±%
Conservative	Brian Woodruff	540	33.7	
Labour	Alan Thwaites	468	29.2	
UKIP	Brian Aylett	258	16.1	
Green	Graham Elliott	185	11.5	
Liberal Democrats	Frances Mitchell	152	9.5	
Majority		72	4.5	
Turnout		1,603	41.2	−0.4
Conservative gain from Labour		Swing		

Beccles South
Party	Candidate	Votes	%	±%
Labour	Michael Adams	373	40.5	
Conservative	Neil Smith	336	36.4	
Liberal Democrats	Alison Briggs	159	17.2	
Green	Michael McGee	54	5.9	
Majority		37	4.1	
Turnout		922	23.6	−1.8
Labour hold		Swing		

Blything
Party	Candidate	Votes	%	±%
Conservative	Wendy Mawer	491	68.0	−0.6
Labour	Angela Turner	115	15.9	−15.5
Liberal Democrats	David O'Neill	58	8.0	+8.0
Green	Michael Platt	58	8.0	+8.0
Majority		376	52.1	+14.9
Turnout		722	41.2	+0.5
Conservative hold		Swing		

Bungay
Party	Candidate	Votes	%	±%
Conservative	John Groom	697	48.6	
Labour	Lynn Derges	419	29.2	
Liberal Democrats	Wendy Curry	173	12.1	
Green	Simon Thompson	144	10.0	
Majority		278	19.4	
Turnout		1,433	37.3	−1.7
Conservative hold		Swing		

Carlton
Party	Candidate	Votes	%	±%
Conservative	Frank Mortimer	501	58.1	
Labour	Peter Shelley	199	23.1	
Liberal Democrats	Brian Howe	133	15.4	
Green	Emma Waller	30	3.5	
Majority		302	35.0	
Turnout		863	24.0	−1.0
Conservative hold		Swing		

Carlton Colville
Party	Candidate	Votes	%	±%
Conservative	Kathleen Grant	580	50.4	
Labour	Paul Widdowson	356	31.0	
Liberal Democrats	John Marsden	161	14.0	
Green	Richard Vinton	53	4.6	
Majority		224	19.4	
Turnout		1,150	21.8	−4.4
Conservative hold		Swing		

Halesworth
Party	Candidate	Votes	%	±%
Conservative	Robert Niblett	684	49.6	
Labour	Julie McLoughlin	274	19.9	
Green	Paul Whitlow	270	19.6	
Liberal Democrats	Henri Watts	150	10.9	
Majority		410	29.7	
Turnout		1,378	35.8	−6.1
Conservative hold		Swing		

Harbour
Party	Candidate	Votes	%	±%
Independent	Norman Keable	575	38.4	
Labour	Ian Graham	412	27.5	
Liberal Democrats	Jack Thain	304	20.3	
Conservative	James Fraser	150	10.0	
Green	Peter Taylor	56	3.7	
Majority		163	10.9	
Turnout		1,497	26.8	−6.3
Independent gain from Labour		Swing		

Kirkley
Party	Candidate	Votes	%	±%
Liberal Democrats	Gifford Baxter	710	51.2	
Labour	Josette Bellham	416	30.0	
Conservative	Paul Kimble	178	12.8	
Green	Maxine Narburgh	82	5.9	
Majority		294	21.2	
Turnout		1,386	25.5	−8.0
Liberal Democrats hold		Swing		

Normanston
Party	Candidate	Votes	%	±%
Labour	David Thomas	467	39.4	
Conservative	Dorothy Blenkinsopp	405	34.1	
Liberal Democrats	Andrew Thomas	190	16.0	
Green	Stephen Sizer	65	5.5	
Socialist Alliance	Nicholas Bird	59	5.0	
Majority		62	5.3	
Turnout		1,186	21.8	−5.5
Labour hold		Swing		

Oulton
Party	Candidate	Votes	%	±%
Independent	Peter Collecott	461	43.3	
Labour	Marie Rodgers	289	27.2	
Conservative	Andrew Borrett	274	25.8	
Green	Diana Whiting	40	3.8	
Majority		172	16.1	
Turnout		1,064	32.2	−3.0
Independent gain from Conservative		Swing		

Pakefield
Party	Candidate	Votes	%	±%
Labour	Stephen Barrett	782	43.4	
Conservative	Marcus Ardley	562	31.2	
Liberal Democrats	Lorraine Lakes	362	20.1	
Green	Melanie Harrison	96	5.3	
Majority		220	12.2	
Turnout		1,802	32.8	−4.2
Labour hold		Swing		

St. Margarets
Party	Candidate	Votes	%	±%
Labour	Rosemary Winterton	626	43.5	
Conservative	John Burford	540	37.5	
Liberal Democrats	Patricia Anderson	202	14.0	
Green	Colin Boor	71	4.9	
Majority		86	6.0	
Turnout		1,439	25.0	−4.0
Labour hold		Swing		

Whitton
Party	Candidate	Votes	%	±%
Labour	Catherine Barrett	654	40.8	
Conservative	Barry Bee	421	26.3	
Independent	Reginald Allen	260	16.2	
Liberal Democrats	Sandra Tonge	209	13.1	
Green	James Stoddart	57	3.6	
Majority		233	14.5	
Turnout		1,601	27.5	−4.2
Labour hold		Swing		

Worlingham
Party	Candidate	Votes	%	±%
Conservative	Kenneth Sale	691	56.7	
Labour	Michael Turner	278	22.8	
Liberal Democrats	Philip Mitchell	193	15.8	
Green	Nicola Elliott	57	4.7	
Majority		413	33.9	
Turnout		1,219	34.5	−7.0
Conservative hold		Swing		

Wrentham
Party	Candidate	Votes	%	±%
Conservative	John Goldsmith	370	64.6	
Labour	Jack Seal	86	15.0	
Liberal Democrats	Nicholas Bromley	74	12.9	
Green	Ray Cameron-Goodman	43	7.5	
Majority		284	49.6	
Turnout		573	32.6	−1.3
Conservative hold		Swing		

== By-elections ==
=== Kessingland ===
Kessingland: 26 February 2004
Party	Candidate	Votes	%	±%
Conservative		463	39.3	+3.1
Labour		417	35.4	−16.5
Liberal Democrats		297	25.2	+13.3
Majority		46	3.9	N/A
Turnout		1,177		
Conservative gain from Labour		Swing	▲10.0	
