= 2003 Newcastle-under-Lyme Borough Council election =

2003 UK local government election

Results of the 2003 Newcastle-under-Lyme Borough Council election

Elections to Newcastle-under-Lyme Borough Council were held on 1 May 2003. One third of the council was up for election and the council stayed under no overall control.

After the election, the composition of the council was:

- Labour 29
- Liberal Democrat 18
- Conservative 12
- Caring Party 1

== Election result ==
Newcastle-under-Lyme local election result 2003
Party	Seats	Gains	Losses	Net gain/loss	Seats %	Votes %	Votes	+/−
Labour	10	1	1	0	50.0	36.9	8,655	-5.2%
Conservative	5	2	0	+2	25.0	28.1	6,583	+1.2%
Liberal Democrats	4	0	3	-3	20.0	31.3	7,344	+1.5%
Caring Party	1	1	0	+1	5.0	3.1	738	+2.2%
Green	0	0	0	0	0	0.4	91	+0.1%
Independent	0	0	0	0	0	0.1	19	+0.1%

== Ward results ==
Audley and Bignall End
Party	Candidate	Votes	%	±%
Labour	Melicha Lewis	669	39.8	
Liberal Democrats	Ian Wilkes	649	38.6	
Conservative	Robert Edwards	365	21.7	
Majority		20	1.2	
Turnout		1,683		
Labour hold		Swing		

Bradwell
Party	Candidate	Votes	%	±%
Labour	Sandra Hambleton	756	60.7	
Conservative	David Parfitt	247	19.8	
Liberal Democrats	David Dugdale	243	19.5	
Majority		509	30.9	
Turnout		1,246		
Labour hold		Swing		

Butt Lane
Party	Candidate	Votes	%	±%
Labour	John Macmillan	482	49.6	
Liberal Democrats	Maurice Leese	336	34.6	
Conservative	Pauline Rowley	153	15.8	
Majority		146	15.0	
Turnout		971		
Labour hold		Swing		

Chesterton
Party	Candidate	Votes	%	±%
Labour	Sheila Phillips	563	56.8	
Liberal Democrats	Andrew Cooley	278	28.1	
Conservative	Malcolm Moore	150	15.1	
Majority		285	28.7	
Turnout		991		
Labour hold		Swing		

Cross Heath
Party	Candidate	Votes	%	±%
Labour	John Williams	740	59.8	
Liberal Democrats	Leo Hamburger	218	17.6	
Conservative	Eleanor Moore	183	14.8	
Caring Party	Stephanie Wilcox	96	7.8	
Majority		522	42.2	
Turnout		1,237		
Labour hold		Swing		

Halmerend
Party	Candidate	Votes	%	±%
Liberal Democrats	Gavin Webb	636	51.1	
Labour	Trevor Sproston	332	26.7	
Conservative	Mark Riley	277	22.2	
Majority		304	24.4	
Turnout		1,245		
Liberal Democrats hold		Swing		

Keele
Party	Candidate	Votes	%	±%
Liberal Democrats	Wenslie Naylon	231	67.0	
Labour	Jacqueline Fowler	64	18.6	
Conservative	Joanne Hampton	50	14.5	
Majority		167	48.4	
Turnout		345		
Liberal Democrats hold		Swing		

Kidsgrove
Party	Candidate	Votes	%	±%
Labour	Martin Bentley	673	54.7	
Liberal Democrats	Robert Porter	427	34.7	
Conservative	Edward Lowe	131	10.6	
Majority		146	20.0	
Turnout		1,231		
Labour hold		Swing		

Knutton and Silverdale
Party	Candidate	Votes	%	±%
Labour	David Leech	461	54.4	
Caring Party	Derrick Huckfield	319	37.6	
Liberal Democrats	Julian Colclough	41	4.8	
Independent	Michael Nicklin	19	2.2	
Conservative	Michael James	8	0.9	
Majority		142	16.8	
Turnout		848		
Labour hold		Swing		

Loggerheads and Whitmore
Party	Candidate	Votes	%	±%
Conservative	Colin Ince	1,176	73.3	
Labour	Brian O'Rourke	261	16.3	
Liberal Democrats	Brian Machin	168	10.5	
Majority		915	57.0	
Turnout		1,605		
Conservative hold		Swing		

Madeley
Party	Candidate	Votes	%	±%
Labour	William Sinnott	444	43.9	
Liberal Democrats	Bryan Kirkham	351	34.7	
Conservative	Andrew Davies	216	21.4	
Majority		93	9.2	
Turnout		1,011		
Labour hold		Swing		

May Bank
Party	Candidate	Votes	%	±%
Conservative	Simon Tagg	810	44.5	
Liberal Democrats	Trevor Johnson	601	33.0	
Labour	Margaret McQuillan	408	22.4	
Majority		209	11.5	
Turnout		1,819		
Conservative gain from Liberal Democrats		Swing		

Newchapel
Party	Candidate	Votes	%	±%
Conservative	Nora Salt	305	39.9	
Liberal Democrats	Sandra Bowyer	238	31.1	
Labour	Eileen Astle	222	29.0	
Majority		67	8.8	
Turnout		765		
Conservative gain from Liberal Democrats		Swing		

Ravenscliffe
Party	Candidate	Votes	%	±%
Labour	Raymond Astle	328	44.3	
Liberal Democrats	Geoffrey Hall	291	39.3	
Conservative	Edgar Greatbatch	121	16.4	
Majority		37	5.0	
Turnout		740		
Labour hold		Swing		

Seabridge
Party	Candidate	Votes	%	±%
Conservative	Peter Hailstones	618	46.1	
Labour	Stephen James	481	35.9	
Liberal Democrats	Eric Durber	242	18.0	
Majority		137	10.2	
Turnout		1,341		
Conservative hold		Swing		

Silverdale and Park Site
Party	Candidate	Votes	%	±%
Caring Party	Eileen Braithwaite	323	40.8	
Labour	George Cairns	311	39.3	
Liberal Democrats	John Cornes	83	10.5	
Conservative	James Albinson	75	9.5	
Majority		12	1.5	
Turnout		792		
Independent gain from Labour		Swing		

Talke
Party	Candidate	Votes	%	±%
Liberal Democrats	Arthur Amos	532	58.4	
Labour	Tom Meir	273	30.0	
Conservative	Beverley Yearsley	106	11.6	
Majority		259	28.4	
Turnout		911		
Liberal Democrats hold		Swing		

Thistleberry
Party	Candidate	Votes	%	±%
Liberal Democrats	William Jones	943	58.0	
Conservative	Bruce Worthington	387	23.8	
Labour	Joseph Matthews	297	18.3	
Majority		556	34.2	
Turnout		1,627		
Liberal Democrats hold		Swing		

Westlands
Party	Candidate	Votes	%	±%
Conservative	Jeremy Lefroy	1,001	59.0	
Liberal Democrats	Hilary Jones	410	24.1	
Labour	Ann Beech	287	16.9	
Majority		591	34.9	
Turnout		1,698		
Conservative hold		Swing		

Wolstanton
Party	Candidate	Votes	%	±%
Labour	Michael Clarke	603	45.5	
Liberal Democrats	Pamela Patten	426	32.2	
Conservative	John Cooper	204	15.4	
Green	Ann Beirne	91	6.9	
Majority		177	13.3	
Turnout		1,324		
Labour gain from Liberal Democrats		Swing		
