= 2003 Raleigh mayoral election =

Raleigh mayoral election, 2003
- October 7, 2003

Candidate	Charles Meeker	John Odom
Popular vote	27,128	18,918
Percentage	58.82%	41.02%
Mayor before election
Charles Meeker
Democratic
Elected mayor
Charles Meeker
Democratic

The Raleigh mayoral election of 2003 was held on October 7, 2003, to elect a Mayor of Raleigh, North Carolina. The election is non-partisan. It was won by incumbent mayor Charles Meeker, who defeated John Odom in the primary. Because Meeker won more than 50% in the first round, there was no need for a run-off.

== Results ==
2003 Raleigh mayoral election
Candidate	Votes	%
Charles Meeker (incumbent)	27,128	58.82
John Odom	18,918	41.02
Write-ins	76	0.16
Turnout	46,122	%
