= 2003 Armenian constitutional referendum =

25 May 2003
- Outcome: The proposition failed due to failing to achieve approval from at least one-third of all registered voters.

Results
Choice	Votes	%
Yes	559,687	50.33%
No	552,257	49.67%
Valid votes	1,111,944	91.90%
Invalid or blank votes	98,046	8.10%
Total votes	1,209,990	100.00%
Registered voters/turnout	2,339,704	51.72%

A constitutional referendum was held in Armenia on 25 May 2003. The constitutional changes would remove some powers from the president, and were narrowly approved by 50.33% of voters, with a 51.72% turnout. However, the results were invalidated, as the number of votes in favour of the changes was lower than one-third of the number of registered voters (779,901).

== Results ==
Choice	Votes	%
For	559,687	50.33
Against	552,257	49.67
Total	1,111,944	100.00
Valid votes	1,111,944	91.90
Invalid/blank votes	98,046	8.10
Total votes	1,209,990	100.00
Registered voters/turnout	2,339,704	51.72
