= 2003 Charlotte mayoral election =

- 4 November 2003
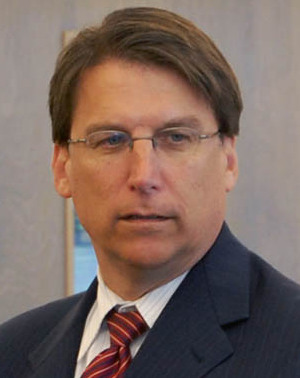

Nominee	Pat McCrory	Craig Madans
Party	Republican	Democratic
Popular vote	44,123	31,101
Percentage	56.51%	39.83%
Mayor before election
Pat McCrory
Republican
Elected mayor
Pat McCrory
Republican

The Charlotte mayoral election of 2003 was held on 4 November 2003 to elect a Mayor of Charlotte, North Carolina. It was won by Republican incumbent Pat McCrory, who won a fifth consecutive term by defeating Democratic nominee Craig Madans in the general election.

== Primaries ==
=== Democratic primary ===
2003 Charlotte mayoral election – Democratic primary
Party	Candidate	Votes	%	±%
Democratic	Craig Madans	8,275	73.57	
Democratic	Leonard Harris	2,279	20.26	
Democratic	Others	694	6.63	
Turnout		11,248	5.08	

=== Republican primary ===
2003 Charlotte mayoral election – Republican primary
Party	Candidate	Votes	%	±%
Republican	Pat McCrory (incumbent)	10,379	64.17	
Republican	Michael J. Castano	4,913	30.38	
Republican	Edward J. Mulheren	839	5.19	
Republican	Others	43	0.27	
Turnout		16,174	9.03	

== General election ==
2003 Charlotte mayoral election
Party	Candidate	Votes	%	±%
Republican	Pat McCrory (incumbent)	44,123	56.51	
Democratic	Craig Madans	31,101	39.83	
Libertarian	Charlton L. Harvey	1,546	1.98	
Other	Others	1,309	1.68	
Turnout		78,079	23.34	
