= 2003 Transnistrian referendum =

- 6 April 2003

Results
Choice	Votes	%
Yes	83,509	56.00%
No	65,616	44.00%
Valid votes	149,125	97.38%
Invalid or blank votes	4,015	2.62%
Total votes	153,140	100.00%
Registered voters/turnout	393,432	38.92%

A referendum was held in the breakaway republic of Transnistria on 6 April 2003. Voters were asked to support a change in the country's constitution that would allow the private ownership of land. Turnout was 38.92%, falling short of the 50% required by Transnistrian law for the referendum to be valid. Of the participating voters, 56% voted in favour and 44% against.

== Results ==
Transnistrian constitutional referendum, April 2003
Choice	Votes	%
For	83,509	56.00
Against	65,616	44.00
Total	149,125	100.00
Valid votes	149,125	97.38
Invalid/blank votes	4,015	2.62
Total votes	153,140	100.00
Registered voters/turnout	393,432	38.92
Turnout needed		50.00
