= Crawley Borough Council elections =

Local government elections in West Sussex, England

One third of Crawley Borough Council in West Sussex, England is elected each year, followed by one year without election. Since the last boundary changes in 2019, 36 councillors have been elected from 13 wards.

== Political control ==
From the first elections to the council in 1973 following the reforms of the Local Government Act 1972, political control of the council has been held by the following parties:

| Party in control | Years |
|---|---|
| Labour | 1973–2006 |
| Conservative | 2006 |
| No overall control | 2006–2007 |
| Conservative | 2007–2014 |
| Labour | 2014–2020 |
| No overall control | 2020–2022 |
| Labour | 2022–present |

=== Leadership ===
The leaders of the council since 1973 have been:

| Councillor | Party | From | To |
|---|---|---|---|
| George Waller | Labour | 1973 | 1978 |
| Ben Clay | Labour | 1978 | 1980 |
| Alf Pegler | Labour | 1980 | 1982 |
| Tony Edwards | Labour | 1982 | 1983 |
| Ben Clay | Labour | 1983 | 1986 |
| Alf Pegler | Labour | 1986 | 1996 |
| Tony Edwards | Labour | 1996 | 2000 |
| Chris Redmayne | Labour | 2000 | 26 May 2006 |
| Bob Lanzer | Conservative | 26 May 2006 | Aug 2013 |
| Howard Bloom | Conservative | 26 Sep 2013 | 13 Jun 2014 |
| Peter Lamb | Labour | 13 Jun 2014 | 27 May 2022 |
| Michael Jones | Labour | 27 May 2022 | |

== Council elections ==
Summary of the council composition after recent council elections, click on the year for full details of each election. Boundary changes took place for the 2004 election increasing the number of seats by 5, leading to the whole council being elected in that year.

Composition of the council
| Year | Conservative | Labour | Liberal Democrats (Note: Includes totals for the predecessors of the Liberal Democrats, the Liberal Party and SDP (both of which participated in the Alliance).) | UKIP | Independents & Others | Council control after election |
|---|---|---|---|---|---|---|
Local government reorganisation; council established (32 seats)
| 1973 | 5 | 25 | 0 | – | 0 | Labour |
| 1976 | 11 | 14 | 0 | – | 0 | Labour |
New ward boundaries (26 seats)
| 1979 | 10 | 16 | 0 | – | 0 | Labour |
| 1980 | 8 | 18 | 0 | – | 0 | Labour |
| 1982 | 8 | 18 | 0 | – | 0 | Labour |
New ward boundaries (32 seats)
| 1983 | 12 | 20 | 0 | – | 0 | Labour |
| 1984 | 14 | 18 | 0 | – | 0 | Labour |
| 1986 | 12 | 20 | 0 | – | 0 | Labour |
| 1987 | 13 | 18 | 1 | – | 0 | Labour |
| 1988 | 10 | 21 | 1 | – | 0 | Labour |
| 1990 | 8 | 21 | 1 | – | 2 | Labour |
| 1991 | 7 | 24 | 1 | – | 0 | Labour |
| 1992 | 9 | 22 | 1 | – | 0 | Labour |
| 1994 | 7 | 23 | 2 | 0 | 0 | Labour |
| 1995 | 4 | 26 | 2 | 0 | 0 | Labour |
| 1996 | 2 | 28 | 2 | 0 | 0 | Labour |
| 1998 | 3 | 27 | 2 | 0 | 0 | Labour |
| 1999 | 5 | 25 | 2 | 0 | 0 | Labour |
| 2000 | 6 | 24 | 2 | 0 | 0 | Labour |
| 2002 | 7 | 23 | 2 | 0 | 0 | Labour |
| 2003 | 8 | 22 | 2 | 0 | 0 | Labour |
New ward boundaries (37 seats)
| 2004 | 16 | 19 | 2 | 0 | 0 | Labour |
| 2006 | 19 | 16 | 2 | 0 | 0 | Conservative |
| 2007 | 23 | 11 | 3 | 0 | 0 | Conservative |
| 2008 | 26 | 9 | 2 | 0 | 0 | Conservative |
| 2010 | 26 | 11 | 0 | 0 | 0 | Conservative |
| 2011 | 24 | 13 | 0 | 0 | 0 | Conservative |
| 2012 | 21 | 16 | 0 | 0 | 0 | Conservative |
| 2014 | 16 | 20 | 0 | 1 | 0 | Labour |
| 2015 | 18 | 19 | 0 | 0 | 0 | Labour |
| 2016 | 17 | 20 | 0 | 0 | 0 | Labour |
| 2018 | 17 | 20 | 0 | 0 | 0 | Labour |
New ward boundaries (36 seats)
| 2019 | 17 | 19 | 0 | 0 | 0 | Labour |
| 2021 | 18 | 17 | 0 | 0 | 1 | No overall control |
| 2022 | 17 | 18 | 0 | 0 | 1 (Note: 1 vacant seat) | Labour |
| 2023 | 16 | 20 | 0 | 0 | 0 | Labour |
| 2024 | 11 | 25 | 0 | 0 | 0 | Labour |

== Borough result maps ==
2004 results map

2006 results map

2007 results map

2008 results map

2010 results map

2011 results map

2012 results map

2014 results map

2015 results map

2016 results map

2018 results map

2019 results map

2021 results map

2022 results map

2023 results map

2024 results map

2026 results map

== By-election results ==
By-elections occur when seats become vacant between council elections. Below is a summary of recent by-elections; full by-election results can be found by clicking on the by-election name.

| By-election | Date | Incumbent party | Winning party |
|---|---|---|---|
| Langley Green | 28 November 1996 | Labour | Labour |
| West Green by-election | 14 September 2000 | Labour | Labour |
| Pound Hill South | 2 October 2003 | Conservative | Conservative |
| Northgate | 15 October 2009 | Liberal Democrats | Labour |
| Tilgate | 7 October 2010 | Conservative | Labour |
| Southgate | 9 October 2014 | UKIP | Labour |
| Maidenbower | 4 May 2017 | Conservative | Conservative |
| Pound Hill South and Worth | 8 June 2017 | Conservative | Conservative |
| Tilgate | 26 September 2019 | Conservative | Conservative |
| Southgate | 9 June 2022 | Labour | Labour |
| Maidenbower | 4 July 2024 | Conservative | Conservative |
| Northgate and West Green | 24 October 2024 | Labour | Labour |

=== 2002-2006 ===
Pound Hill South By-Election 2 October 2003
| Party | Candidate | Votes | % | ±% |
|---|---|---|---|---|
| Conservative | | 548 | 51.3 | −5.8 |
| Labour | | 234 | 21.9 | −3.9 |
| Liberal Democrats | Eddie Reay | 210 | 19.7 | +2.6 |
| Green | | 76 | 7.1 | +7.1 |
| Majority | | 314 | 29.4 | |
| Turnout | | 1,068 | 19.8 | |
| Conservative hold | | Swing | | |

=== 2006-2010 ===
Northgate By-Election 15 October 2009
| Party | Candidate | Votes | % | ±% |
|---|---|---|---|---|
| Labour | Geraint Thomas | 527 | 43.3 | +19.0 |
| Conservative | Ryan Smith | 446 | 36.7 | +18.9 |
| Liberal Democrats | Darren Wise | 230 | 18.9 | −26.6 |
| Justice Party | Arshad Khan | 13 | 1.1 | −8.4 |
| Majority | | 81 | 6.6 | |
| Turnout | | 1,216 | 31.3 | |
| Labour gain from Liberal Democrats | | Swing | | |

=== 2010-2014 ===
Tilgate By-Election 7 October 2010
| Party | Candidate | Votes | % | ±% |
|---|---|---|---|---|
| Labour | Colin Lloyd | 764 | 50.8 | +15.2 |
| Conservative | Ray Ward | 656 | 43.9 | +2.8 |
| UKIP | Maurice Day | 79 | 5.2 | +5.2 |
| Justice Party | Arshad Khan | 6 | 0.4 | +0.4 |
| Majority | | 108 | 6.9 | |
| Turnout | | 1,505 | 32 | −7.3 |
| Labour gain from Conservative | | Swing | | |

=== 2014-2018 ===
Southgate By-Election 9 October 2014
| Party | Candidate | Votes | % | ±% |
|---|---|---|---|---|
| Labour | Michael Pickett | 733 | 44.1 | +9 |
| Conservative | Jan Tarrant | 642 | 38.6 | +6.1 |
| UKIP | Simon Darroch | 277 | 16.7 | −6.7 |
| Justice Party | Arshad Khan | 10 | 0.6 | +0.6 |
| Majority | | 91 | 5.5 | |
| Turnout | | 1,662 | 25 | −13.3 |
| Labour gain from UKIP | | Swing | | |

Maidenbower By-Election 4 May 2017
| Party | Candidate | Votes | % | ±% |
|---|---|---|---|---|
| Conservative | Nigel Boxall | 1,377 | 65.1 | −5.8 |
| Labour | Morgan Flack | 413 | 19.5 | +0.5 |
| Liberal Democrats | Paul Cummings | 178 | 8.4 | +8.4 |
| UKIP | Allan Griffiths | 100 | 4.7 | +4.7 |
| Green | Richard Kail | 48 | 2.3 | −7.8 |
| Majority | | 964 | 45.6 | |
| Turnout | | 2,116 | | |
| Conservative hold | | Swing | | |

Pound Hill South and Worth By-Election 8 June 2017
| Party | Candidate | Votes | % | ±% |
|---|---|---|---|---|
| Conservative | Alison Pendlington | 2,435 | 52.2 | −7.5 |
| Labour | Colin Flack | 1,677 | 36.0 | +2.6 |
| Green | Daniel Elliott | 193 | 4.1 | −2.8 |
| Liberal Democrats | Harry Old | 192 | 4.1 | +4.1 |
| UKIP | Janet Setford-Thompson | 165 | 3.5 | +3.5 |
| Majority | | 758 | 16.3 | |
| Turnout | | 4,662 | | |
| Conservative hold | | Swing | | |

=== 2018-2022 ===
Tilgate By-Election 26 September 2019
| Party | Candidate | Votes | % | ±% |
|---|---|---|---|---|
| Conservative | Maureen Mwagale | 741 | 57.0 | |
| Labour | Kiran Khan | 396 | 30.5 | |
| Liberal Democrats | Angharad Old | 82 | 6.3 | |
| Green | Derek Hardman | 75 | 5.8 | |
| Justice Party | Arshad Khan | 5 | 0.4 | |
| Majority | | 345 | 26.6 | |
| Turnout | | 1,299 | | |
| Conservative hold | | Swing | | |

=== 2022-2026 ===
Southgate By-Election 9 June 2022
| Party | Candidate | Votes | % | ±% |
|---|---|---|---|---|
| Labour | Bob Noyce | 938 | 50.1 | +3.5 |
| Conservative | Jan Tarrant | 790 | 42.2 | +2.8 |
| Green | Richard Kail | 144 | 7.7 | +1.6 |
| Majority | | 148 | 7.9 | |
| Turnout | | 1,872 | | |
| Labour hold | | Swing | | |

Maidenbower By-Election 4 July 2024
| Party | Candidate | Votes | % | ±% |
|---|---|---|---|---|
| Conservative | Imtiaz Khan | 1,606 | 39.6 | −4.3 |
| Green | Max Perry | 1,227 | 30.2 | +1.5 |
| Labour | Matt Pritchard | 1,226 | 30.2 | +2.8 |
| Majority | | 379 | 9.3 | |
| Turnout | | 4,059 | | |
| Conservative hold | | Swing | | |

Northgate and West Green By-Election 24 October 2024
| Party | Candidate | Votes | % | ±% |
|---|---|---|---|---|
| Labour | Khayla Abu Mosa | 704 | 38.5 | −15.0 |
| Conservative | Jonathan Purdy | 492 | 26.9 | −2.0 |
| Reform | Tim Charters | 292 | 16.0 | +16.0 |
| Green | Nick Park | 174 | 9.5 | −3.0 |
| Workers Party | Linda Bamieh | 133 | 7.3 | +7.3 |
| TUSC | Robin Burnham | 35 | 1.9 | −3.2 |
| Majority | | 212 | 11.6 | |
| Turnout | | 1,830 | | |
| Labour hold | | Swing | | |
