= 2015 Crawley Borough Council election =

2015 UK local government election

← 2014	7 May 2015	2016 →

12 of the 37 seats to Crawley Borough Council 19 seats needed for a majority
	First party	Second party
Party	Labour	Conservative
Last election	20	16
Seats before	21^{†}	16
Seats won	3	9
Seats after	19	18
Seat change	▼2	▲2
Popular vote	15,671	21,760
Percentage	37.2%	51.6%
- Map showing the results of the 2015 Crawley Borough Council elections by ward. Blue show Conservative seats, and red shows Labour. Wards in grey had no election.^{†} Labour gained a seat from UKIP in a by-election in October 2014
Council control before election
Labour
Council control after election
Labour

The 2015 Crawley Borough Council election took place on 7 May 2015 to elect a third of the members of Crawley Borough Council in West Sussex, England as part of the English local elections coinciding with the 2015 General Election. The seats up for election were last contested in 2011.

== Results ==
2015 Crawley Borough Council Election
Party	Seats	Gains	Losses	Net gain/loss	Seats %	Votes %	Votes	+/−
Labour	19	0	1	-1	51	37	15,671	
Conservative	18	1	0	+1	49	52	21,760	
UKIP	0	0	0	0	0	6	2,723	
Liberal Democrats	0	0	0	0	0	3	1,066	
Green	0	0	0	0	0	2	848	
Libertarian	0	0	0	0	0	0.1	53	
Justice Party	0	0	0	0	0	0.1	40	

The Labour Party governing group of councillors saw their majority reduced to one councillor, with one gained by a Conservative, keeping some areas of the authority having no representatives within the group with control of the council. Five of six seats held were retained by Labour candidates, keeping some areas with sole majority party representation. None of the unrepresented parties achieved a first or second place in any of the seats for which the election took place. Seats from two lower-population wards were without elections in 2015.

== Ward by ward ==
=== Bewbush ===
Bewbush
Party	Candidate	Votes	%
Labour	Chris Cheshire	1,636	
Conservative	Patrick Robert Reid	1,173	
UKIP	Simon Darroch	631	
Green	Richard Martin Kail	171	
Justice Party	Arshad Khan	40	
Turnout			57%
Labour hold			

=== Furnace Green ===
Furnace Green
Party	Candidate	Votes	%
Conservative	Duncan Crow	1,560	
Labour	Tony Patel	903	
UKIP	Allan Peter Griffiths	516	
Liberal Democrats	David Lee Anderson	156	
Turnout			69%
Conservative hold			

=== Gossops Green ===
Gossops Green
Party	Candidate	Votes	%
Conservative	Lisa Vitler	1,278	
Labour	Jason Robert Vine	920	
UKIP	Christopher James Brown	544	
Turnout			69%
Conservative hold			

=== Ifield ===
Ifield
Party	Candidate	Votes	%
Conservative	Martin Alan Stone	2,312	
Labour	Sue Mullins	1,906	
Turnout			62%
Conservative gain from Labour			

=== Langley Green ===
Langley Green
Party	Candidate	Votes	%
Labour	Andrew Clifford Skudder	1,739	
Conservative	Andrew Simon Jagger	957	
UKIP	Sharon Elizabeth Kennett	549	
Liberal Democrats	Kevin Osborne	152	
Turnout			59%
Labour hold			

=== Maidenbower ===
Maidenbower
Party	Candidate	Votes	%
Conservative	Kim Jaggard	3,455	
Labour	Sumon Ahmed	1,066	
Turnout			69%
Conservative hold			

=== Northgate ===
Northgate
Party	Candidate	Votes	%
Labour	Geraint Thomas	1,227	
Conservative	Tina Belben	930	
Liberal Democrats	Michael John Sargent	156	
Turnout			59%
Labour hold			

=== Pound Hill North ===
Pound Hill North
Party	Candidate	Votes	%
Conservative	Kevan McCarthy	2,341	
Labour	Carlos Portal Castro	853	
Liberal Democrats	Valerie Ann Spooner	299	
Turnout			69%
Conservative hold			

=== Pound Hill South and Worth ===
Pound Hill South and Worth
Party	Candidate	Votes	%
Conservative	Beryl Mecrow	2,901	
Labour	Rory Stuart Fiveash	1,383	
Turnout			68%
Conservative hold			

=== Southgate ===
Southgate
Party	Candidate	Votes	%
Conservative	Jan Tarrant	1,894	
Labour	Michael William Pickett	1,564	
Green	Robin David Fitton	268	
Liberal Democrats	Elke Smith	137	
Libertarian	Adam Gregory Brown	53	
Turnout			61%
Conservative gain from Labour			

- Note:Southgate was won by Conservative councillor Karl Williamson at the previous regular election in 2011. However, Williamson defected to UKIP in 2013, and stood down from the council in 2014, and his seat was gained by Labour in the resulting by-election.

=== Three Bridges ===
Three Bridges
Party	Candidate	Votes	%
Conservative	Bob Burgess	1,597	
Labour	Daryl English	1,308	
UKIP	Martin Rann	483	
Green	Tim Holt	223	
Turnout			65%
Conservative hold			

=== Tilgate ===
Tilgate
Party	Candidate	Votes	%
Conservative	Francis Guidera	1,362	
Labour	Julian Charatan	1,166	
Green	Derek Hardman	186	
Liberal Democrats	James Michael Harper	166	
Turnout			65%
Conservative hold			
