= 2022 Crawley Borough Council election =

2022 UK local government election

2022 Crawley Borough Council election results map

The 2022 Crawley Borough Council took place on 5 May 2022 to elect members of Crawley Borough Council. This is on the same day as other local elections. 12 of the 36 seats were up for election.

== Background ==
In its first election in 1973, Crawley was won by Labour. Their control of the council continued until 2006, when the Conservatives took control. Labour regained the council in 2014, and this continued until the 2021 election, when the Conservatives became the largest party, although Labour continued to govern in coalition with an independent. In that election, the Conservatives gained 1 seat with 48.6% of the vote, Labour lost one seat with 39.5%, and independents made no gains or losses with 0.9%.

The seats up for election in 2022 were last elected in 2019 due to boundary changes. In that election, Labour won 19 seats with 42.6%, and Conservatives won 17 with 42.6%.

== Previous council composition ==
After 2021 election		Before 2022 election	
Party	Seats	Party	Seats
Conservative	18	Conservative	18
Labour	17	Labour	16
Independent	1	Independent	1

== Results ==
2022 Crawley Borough Council election
Party	This election			Full council			This election		
Party	Seats	Net	Seats %	Other	Total	Total %	Votes	Votes %	+/−
Labour	7	▲2	53.8	11	18	50.0	10,820	44.7	+5.2
Conservative	5	▼1	38.5	12	17	47.2	10,131	41.9	–6.7
Green	0	Steady	0.0	0	0	0.0	1,913	7.9	+1.2
Liberal Democrats	0	Steady	0.0	0	0	0.0	1,007	4.2	+0.1
Independent	0	▼1	0.0	0	0	0.0	150	0.5	–0.4
Heritage	0	Steady	0.0	0	0	0.0	112	0.5	N/A
Reform UK	0	Steady	0.0	0	0	0.0	91	0.4	+0.2

== Council composition after election ==
After 2022 election
Party	Seats
Labour	18
Conservative	17

== Results by ward ==
An asterisk indicates an incumbent councillor.

=== Bewbush and North Broadfield ===
Bewbush and North Broadfield
Party	Candidate	Votes	%	±%
Labour	Sharmila Sivarajah	893	50.1	+1.8
Conservative	Jonathan Purdy	534	30.0	−4.4
Green	Holly Smith	224	12.6	−0.5
Independent	Robin Burnham	124	7.0	N/A
Independent	Tan Bui	6	0.3	N/A
Majority		359	20.2	
Turnout		1781		
Labour gain from Independent		Swing		

This seat was won from an independent who had defected from Labour since his last election.

=== Broadfield ===
Broadfield
Party	Candidate	Votes	%	±%
Labour	Tim Lunnon*	970	51.8	+2.1
Conservative	Valerie Knight	618	33.0	−10.7
Liberal Democrats	Parveen Khan	172	9.2	+2.6
Heritage	Carolina Morra	112	6.0	N/A
Majority		352	18.8	
Turnout		1872	26	
Labour hold		Swing		

=== Furnace Green ===
Furnace Green
Party	Candidate	Votes	%	±%
Conservative	Hazel Hellier	870	49.7	−1.3
Labour	Jason Vine	676	38.6	−3.3
Liberal Democrats	Angharad Old	115	6.6	−1.7
Reform UK	Allan Griffiths	91	5.2	N/A
Majority		194	11.1	
Turnout		1752		
Conservative hold		Swing		

=== Ifield ===
Ifield
Party	Candidate	Votes	%	±%
Labour	Jilly Hart	1,244	51.0	+13.0
Conservative	Martin Stone	939	38.5	−7.0
Green	Ines Manning	165	6.8	−5.1
Liberal Democrats	Lawrence Mallinson	90	3.7	−0.9
Majority		305	12.5	
Turnout		2,452	34.1	
Labour hold		Swing	▲10.0	

=== Langley Green and Tushmore ===
Langley Green and Tushmore
Party	Candidate	Votes	%	±%
Labour	Tahira Rana	798	51.0	+2.7
Conservative	Tahir Ashraf	470	30.0	−9.7
Liberal Democrats	Mike Sargent	180	11.5	−0.5
Green	Iain Dickson	117	7.5	N/A
Majority		328	21.0	
Turnout		1,584	26.1	
Labour hold		Swing	▲6.2	

=== Maidenbower ===
Maidenbower
Party	Candidate	Votes	%	±%
Conservative	Jennifer Millar-Smith*	1,080	48.0	−14.8
Green	Max Perry	629	28.0	+13.8
Labour	Peter Smith	540	24.0	+1.0
Majority		451	20.0	
Turnout		2,258	33.4	
Conservative hold		Swing	▼14.3	

=== Northgate and West Green ===
Northgate and West Green
Party	Candidate	Votes	%	±%
Labour	Gurinder Jhans*	1,021	48.1	+5.3
Conservative	Tony Johnson	747	35.2	−2.5
Green	John Atherton	219	10.3	N/A
Liberal Democrats	David Anderson	134	6.3	−2.0
Majority		274	12.9	
Turnout		2,135	28.1	
Labour hold		Swing	▲3.9	

=== Pound Hill North and Forge Wood ===
Pound Hill North and Forge Wood
Party	Candidate	Votes	%	±%
Conservative	Tina Belben*	1,071	53.7	−12.7
Labour	Justin Russell	923	46.3	+12.7
Majority		148	7.4	
Turnout		2,020	29.4	
Conservative hold		Swing	▼12.7	

=== Pound Hill South and Worth ===
Pound Hill South and Worth
Party	Candidate	Votes	%	±%
Conservative	Bob Lanzer*	1,214	54.6	−3.8
Labour	Matthew Gaffar	748	33.6	+6.0
Green	Cyril Gambrell	262	11.8	+1.0
Majority		466	21.0	
Turnout		2,239	36.2	
Conservative hold		Swing	▼4.9	

=== Southgate ===
Southgate
Party	Candidate	Votes	%	±%
Labour	Yasmin Khan	1,094	46.6	+4.0
Conservative	Jan Tarrant	927	39.4	−5.9
Liberal Democrats	Andrew Eastman	185	7.9	+2.4
Green	Robin Fitton	144	6.1	−0.5
Majority		167	7.1	
Turnout		2350		
Labour hold		Swing		

=== Three Bridges ===
Three Bridges
Party	Candidate	Votes	%	±%
Labour	Stephen Pritchard	1,161	50.2	+6.0
Conservative	Craig Burke	866	37.5	−5.6
Green	Danielle Kail	153	6.6	−1.7
Liberal Democrats	Paul Taylor-Burr	131	5.7	+1.3
Majority		295	12.8	
Turnout		2311		
Labour gain from Conservative		Swing		

=== Tilgate ===
Tilgate
Party	Candidate	Votes	%	±%
Conservative	Maureen Mwagale*	795	51.4	+4.2
Labour	Khayla Abu Mosa	752	48.6	+13.8
Majority		43	2.8	
Turnout		1547		
Conservative hold		Swing		
