= 2002 Crawley Borough Council election =

2002 UK local government election

The 2002 Crawley Borough Council election took place on 2 May 2002 to elect members of Crawley Borough Council in West Sussex, England. One third of the council was up for election and the Labour Party stayed in overall control of the council.

After the election, the composition of the council was:

- Labour 23
- Conservative 7
- Liberal Democrats 2

== Background ==
Before the election Labour controlled the council with 24 seats, compared to 5 for the Conservatives and 2 Liberal Democrats, with a further seat being vacant. 10 wards were contested, with 2 seats being elected in Pound Hill North.

Issues at the election included the growth of Crawley, parking, litter, street lights and a possible second runway at Gatwick Airport, with issues to do with the national Labour government also being raised.

== Election result ==
Labour remained in control of the council with 23 councillors after holding 7 of the 11 seats contested, despite losing 1 seat to the Conservatives. The Conservative gain came in Furnace Green, where Brenda Blackwell defeated the former Labour mayor Ray Calcott by 1,269 votes to 895. This took to the Conservatives to 7 seats, as they also held the 2 seats contested in Pound Hill North, while the Liberal Democrats remained on 2 seats after holding Northgate.

The election had a trial of all postal voting in the 4 wards of Bewbush, Broadfield, Ifield and Southgate in an attempt to increase turnout. Overall turnout across Crawley was 30.09%, a rise from 23.2% at the 2000 election, and in the wards that trialed all postal voting, turnout increased by an average of 15.7%.

Crawley local election result 2002
Party	Seats	Gains	Losses	Net gain/loss	Seats %	Votes %	Votes	+/−
Labour	7	0	1	-1	63.6	48.2	9,386	
Conservative	3	1	0	+1	27.3	31.2	6,079	
Liberal Democrats	1	0	0	0	9.1	17.4	3,395	
Independent	0	0	0	0	0	1.5	285	
Socialist Labour	0	0	0	0	0	0.8	154	
Justice Party	0	0	0	0	0	0.3	64	
Monster Raving Loony	0	0	0	0	0	0.2	48	
Socialist Alliance	0	0	0	0	0	0.2	46	

== Ward results ==
Bewbush
Party	Candidate	Votes	%	±%
Labour	Doug Murdoch	1,008	60.7	
Conservative	Corinne Bowen	335	20.2	
Liberal Democrats	Kevin Osborne	207	12.5	
Justice Party	Arshad Kahn	64	3.9	
Socialist Alliance	Muriel Hirsh	46	2.8	
Majority		673	40.5	
Turnout		1,660	27.8	+10.6
Labour hold		Swing		

Broadfield
Party	Candidate	Votes	%	±%
Labour	Brian Quinn	1,477	58.4	
Conservative	David Bowen	688	27.2	
Liberal Democrats	Victoria Jones	275	10.9	
Socialist Labour	Martyn Badger	89	3.5	
Majority		789	31.2	
Turnout		2,529	29.5	+15.7
Labour hold		Swing		

Furnace Green
Party	Candidate	Votes	%	±%
Conservative	Brenda Brockwell	1,269	47.4	
Labour	Ray Calcott	895	33.4	
Liberal Democrats	Roger McMurray	516	19.3	
Majority		374	14.0	
Turnout		2,680	25.2	
Conservative gain from Labour		Swing		

Ifield
Party	Candidate	Votes	%	±%
Labour	Ben Clay	1,294	49.5	
Conservative	Christina Belben	548	21.0	
Liberal Democrats	Barry Hamilton	485	18.6	
Independent	Richard Symonds	285	10.9	
Majority		746	28.5	
Turnout		2,612	40.3	+17.8
Labour hold		Swing		

Langley Green
Party	Candidate	Votes	%	±%
Labour	Brenda Smith	918	71.2	
Conservative	Keith Brockwell	212	16.4	
Liberal Democrats	Edward Reay	159	12.3	
Majority		706	54.8	
Turnout		1,289	23.9	
Labour hold		Swing		

Northgate
Party	Candidate	Votes	%	±%
Liberal Democrats	Linda Seekings	705	63.2	
Labour	Nicholas Webber	307	27.5	
Conservative	John Rolf	104	9.3	
Majority		398	35.7	
Turnout		1,116	31.1	
Liberal Democrats hold		Swing		

Pound Hill North (2)
Party	Candidate	Votes	%	±%
Conservative	Henry Smith	866		
Conservative	Sally Blake	844		
Labour	David Green	462		
Labour	John Stephens	451		
Liberal Democrats	Nigel Aldridge	198		
Liberal Democrats	David Barry	154		
Monster Raving Loony	Christopher Hanlon	48		
Turnout		3,023	30.9	
Conservative hold		Swing		
Conservative hold		Swing		

Southgate
Party	Candidate	Votes	%	±%
Labour	Mary Mayne	1,225	50.6	
Conservative	Lee Burke	784	32.4	
Liberal Democrats	Howard Llewelyn	413	17.1	
Majority		441	18.2	
Turnout		2,422	39.7	+18.7
Labour hold		Swing		

Tilgate
Party	Candidate	Votes	%	±%
Labour	Colin Lloyd	720	59.2	
Conservative	Duncan Crow	246	20.2	
Liberal Democrats	Darren Wise	185	15.2	
Socialist Labour	Derek Issacs	65	5.3	
Majority		474	39.0	
Turnout		1,216	27.0	
Labour hold		Swing		

West Green
Party	Candidate	Votes	%	±%
Labour	Bert Crane	629	69.1	
Conservative	Lisa Noel	183	20.1	
Liberal Democrats	Lyndon Hamill	98	10.8	
Majority		446	49.0	
Turnout		910		
Labour hold		Swing		
