= 2023 Crawley Borough Council election =

2023 UK local government election

← 2022	4 May 2023	2024 →

12 out of 36 seats to Crawley Borough Council 19 seats needed for a majority

	First party	Second party
Leader	Michael Jones	Duncan Crow
Party	Labour	Conservative
Last election	19 seats, 44.7%	17 seats, 41.9%
Seats before	19	17 (Note: Including one vacant seat previously held by Conservative councillor Andrew Belben until his death in November 2022.)
Seats won	8	4
Seats after	20	16
Seat change	▲1	▼1
Popular vote	11,354	9,581
Percentage	47.6%	40.2%
Swing	▲2.9%	▼1.7%
- Winner of each seat at the 2023 Crawley Borough Council election
Leader before election
Michael Jones
Labour
Leader after election
Michael Jones
Labour

The 2023 Crawley Borough Council election took place on 4 May 2023 to elect members of Crawley Borough Council in West Sussex, England. This was on the same day as other local elections across England.

== Summary ==
The council was under Labour majority control prior to the election, with the party having a two seat majority over the Conservatives. Labour gained one seat from the Conservatives at this election to increase their majority.

=== Election result ===
2023 Crawley Borough Council election
Party	This election			Full council			This election		
Party	Seats	Net	Seats %	Other	Total	Total %	Votes	Votes %	+/−
Labour	8	▲1	66.7	12	20	55.6	11,354	47.6	+2.9
Conservative	4	▼1	33.3	12	16	44.4	9,581	40.2	–1.7
Green	0	Steady	0.0	0	0	0.0	2,071	8.7	+0.8
Liberal Democrats	0	Steady	0.0	0	0	0.0	349	1.5	–2.7
Heritage	0	Steady	0.0	0	0	0.0	193	0.8	+0.3
Independent	0	Steady	0.0	0	0	0.0	154	0.6	+0.1
Reform UK	0	Steady	0.0	0	0	0.0	127	0.5	+0.1
TUSC	0	Steady	0.0	0	0	0.0	33	0.1	N/A

== Ward results ==
The Statement of Persons Nominated, which details the candidates standing in each ward, was released by Crawley Borough Council following the close of nominations on 5 April 2023. The results for each ward were as follows, with an asterisk (*) indicating an incumbent councillor standing for re-election:

=== Bewbush & North Broadfield ===
Bewbush & North Broadfield
Party	Candidate	Votes	%	±%
Labour	Marion Ayling*	934	55.7	+5.6
Conservative	Tom Liddiard	378	22.6	−7.4
Green	Holly Smith	185	11.0	−1.6
Independent	Robin Burnham	154	9.2	+2.2
Heritage	Debra Plaister	25	1.5	N/A
Majority				
Turnout		1,676	24	
Labour hold		Swing		

=== Broadfield ===
Broadfield
Party	Candidate	Votes	%	±%
Labour	Ian Irvine*	928	54.6	+2.8
Conservative	Kerlo Pharoah	507	29.8	−3.2
Liberal Democrats	Parveen Khan	124	7.3	−1.9
Heritage	Carolina Morra	107	6.3	+0.3
TUSC	Ioannis Kouratos	33	1.9	N/A
Majority				
Turnout		1,699	23	
Labour hold		Swing		

=== Furnace Green ===
Furnace Green
Party	Candidate	Votes	%	±%
Conservative	Duncan Crow*	919	48.4	−1.3
Labour Co-op	Dipesh Patel	851	44.9	+6.3
Reform UK	Allan Griffiths	127	6.7	+1.5
Majority		1,897		
Turnout			43	
Conservative hold		Swing		

=== Gossops Green & North East Broadfield ===
Gossops Green & North East Broadfield
Party	Candidate	Votes	%	±%
Labour Co-op	Chris Mullins*	852	53.1	+16.2
Conservative	Dominic Ramsay	560	34.9	−15.9
Green	Iain Dickson	194	12.1	+6.4
Majority				
Turnout		1,606	35	
Labour Co-op hold		Swing		

=== Ifield ===
Ifield
Party	Candidate	Votes	%	±%
Labour Co-op	Julian Charatan	990	46.3	−4.7
Conservative	Thomas Bidwell	834	39.0	+0.5
Green	Ines Manning	205	9.6	+2.8
Liberal Democrats	Lawrence Mallinson	110	5.1	+1.4
Majority				
Turnout		2,139	30	
Labour Co-op hold		Swing		

=== Langley Green & Tushmore ===
Langley Green & Tushmore
Party	Candidate	Votes	%	±%
Labour Co-op	Imran Ashraf	1,033	63.6	+12.6
Conservative	Alan Hellier	592	36.4	+6.4
Majority				
Turnout		1,625	27	
Labour Co-op hold		Swing		

=== Maidenbower ===
Maidenbower
Party	Candidate	Votes	%	±%
Conservative	Kim Jaggard*	1,131	51.5	+3.5
Green	Max Perry	608	27.7	−0.3
Labour Co-op	Olu Adeniyi	456	20.8	−3.2
Majority				
Turnout		2,195	33	
Conservative hold		Swing		

=== Northgate & West Green ===
Northgate & West Green
Party	Candidate	Votes	%	±%
Labour Co-op	Peter Lamb	1,136	54.6	+6.5
Conservative	Tony Johnson	696	33.4	−1.8
Green	Sally Fadelle	249	12.0	+1.7
Majority				
Turnout		2,081	27	
Labour Co-op hold		Swing		

=== Pound Hill North & Forge Wood ===
Pound Hill North & Forge Wood
Party	Candidate	Votes	%	±%
Labour Co-op	Justin Russell	1,314	53.6	+7.3
Conservative	Richard Burrett*	1,137	46.4	−7.3
Majority				
Turnout		2,451	35	
Labour Co-op gain from Conservative		Swing		

=== Pound Hill South & Worth ===
Pound Hill South & Worth
Party	Candidate	Votes	%	±%
Conservative	Craig Burke	1,099	47.9	−6.7
Labour	Nicholas Hilton	928	40.4	+6.8
Green	Cyril Gambrell	268	11.7	−0.1
Majority				
Turnout		2,295	37	
Conservative hold		Swing		

=== Southgate ===
Southgate
Party	Candidate	Votes	%	±%
Labour	Bob Noyce	974	49.1	+2.5
Conservative	Jan Tarrant	710	35.8	−3.6
Green	Robin Fitton	186	9.4	+3.3
Liberal Democrats	Paul Taylor-Burr	115	5.8	−2.1
Majority				
Turnout		1,985	30	
Labour hold		Swing		

=== Three Bridges ===
Three Bridges
Party	Candidate	Votes	%	±%
Conservative	Brenda Burgess	1,018	46.0	+8.5
Labour	Esra Guler	958	43.3	−6.9
Green	Danielle Kail	176	8.0	+1.4
Heritage	Nicola Addley	61	2.8	N/A
Majority				
Turnout		2,213	34	
Conservative hold		Swing		
