= 2011 Crawley Borough Council election =

2011 UK local government election

← 2010	5 May 2011	2012 →

12 of the 37 seats to Crawley Borough Council 19 seats needed for a majority
	First party	Second party
Party	Conservative	Labour
Last election	26	11
Seats before	25^{†}	12^{†}
Seats won	8	4
Seats after	24	13
Seat change	▼1	▲1
Popular vote	12,762	10,363
Percentage	51.1%	41.5%
- Map showing the results of the 2011 Crawley Borough Council elections by ward. Blue show Conservative seats, and red shows Labour. Wards in grey had no election.^{†} Labour gained a seat from the Conservatives in a by-election in October 2010
Council control before election
Conservative
Council control after election
Conservative

The 2011 Crawley Borough Council election took place on 5 May 2011 to elect members of Crawley District Council in West Sussex, England. One third of the council was up for election and the Conservative Party stayed in overall control of the council.

After the election, the composition of the council was:

- Conservative 24
- Labour 13

== Election result ==
Crawley local election result 2011
Party	Seats	Gains	Losses	Net gain/loss	Seats %	Votes %	Votes	+/−
Conservative	8				66.7	51.1	12,762	
Labour	4				33.3	41.5	10,363	
Green	0				0.0	3.3	812	
Liberal Democrats	0				0.0	2.3	565	
UKIP	0				0.0	1.3	318	
Justice Party	0				0.0	0.5	132	

== Ward results ==
=== Bewbush ===
Bewbush
Party	Candidate	Votes	%
Labour	Chris Cheshire	1,121	
Conservative	Pravin Mistry	564	
Justice Party	Arshad Khan	132	
Turnout			29.55
Labour hold			

=== Furnace Green ===
Furnace Green
Party	Candidate	Votes	%
Conservative	Duncan Crow	1,036	
Labour	Colin Moffatt	722	
Liberal Democrats	Darren Wise	163	
Green	Maris Liles	152	
Turnout			49.48
Conservative hold			

=== Gossops Green ===
Gossops Green
Party	Candidate	Votes	%
Conservative	Keith Blake	797	
Labour	Chris Mullins	792	
Green	Iain Dickson	152	
Turnout			44.86
Conservative hold			

=== Ifield ===
Ifield
Party	Candidate	Votes	%
Labour	Chris Oxlade	1,283	
Conservative	Liam Marshall-Ascough	1,245	
Turnout			38.93
Labour hold			

=== Langley Green ===
Langley Green
Party	Candidate	Votes	%
Labour	David Shreeves	1,139	
Conservative	Christine Brown	539	
UKIP	Peter Brent	170	
Liberal Democrats	Kevin Osborne	126	
Turnout			34.55
Labour hold			

=== Maidenbower ===
Maidenbower
Party	Candidate	Votes	%
Conservative	Lenny Walker	1,737	
Labour	Olusina Adeniyi	522	
Turnout			35.85
Conservative hold			

=== Northgate ===
Northgate
Party	Candidate	Votes	%
Labour Co-op	Geraint Thomas	831	
Conservative	Duncan Peck	551	
Turnout			37.15
Labour Co-op hold			

=== Pound Hill North ===
Pound Hill North
Party	Candidate	Votes	%
Conservative	Sally Blake	1,241	
Labour	Aneel Sharma	435	
Liberal Democrats	Eddie Reay	276	
UKIP	John MacCanna	148	
Turnout			42.78
Conservative hold			

=== Pound Hill South and Worth ===
Pound Hill South and Worth
Party	Candidate	Votes	%
Conservative	Claire Denman	1,783	
Labour	Anita Bateman	794	
Turnout			41.66
Conservative hold			

=== Southgate ===
Southgate
Party	Candidate	Votes	%
Conservative	Karl Williamson	1,091	
Labour	Raj Sharma	995	
Green	Malcolm Liles	366	
Turnout			39.91
Conservative hold			

=== Three Bridges ===
Three Bridges
Party	Candidate	Votes	%
Conservative	Bob Burgess	1,257	
Labour	Thakordas Patel	892	
Turnout			42.03
Conservative hold			

=== Tilgate ===
Tilgate
Party	Candidate	Votes	%
Conservative	Nigel Boxall	921	
Labour	Peter Smith	837	
Green	Derek Hardman	142	
Turnout			42.35
Conservative hold			
