= 2012 Crawley Borough Council election =

2012 UK local government election

- 3 May 2012

12 of the 37 seats to Crawley Borough Council 19 seats needed for a majority
	First party	Second party
Party	Conservative	Labour
Seats before	24	13
Seats won	5	8
Seats after	21	16
Seat change	▼3	▲3
Popular vote	8,527	9,405
Percentage	44.2%	48.8%
- Map showing the results of the 2012 Crawley Borough Council elections by ward. Blue show Conservative seats, and red shows Labour. Wards in grey had no election.
Council control before election
Conservative
Council control after election
Conservative

The 2012 Crawley Borough Council election took place on 3 May 2012 to elect members of Crawley District Council in West Sussex, England. One third of the council was up for election. The Conservative Party retained overall control of the council.

After the election, the composition of the council was as follows:

- Conservative 21
- Labour 16

== Ward results ==
=== Bewbush ===
Bewbush
Party	Candidate	Votes	%
Labour	Marion Ayling	874	70.9%
Conservative	Susan Lester	285	23.1%
Justice Party	Arshad Khan	74	6.0%
Majority		589	47.8%
Turnout		1,233	
Labour hold			

=== Broadfield North ===
Broadfield North
Party	Candidate	Votes	%
Labour	Brian Quinn	738	69.4%
Conservative	Simon Darroch	326	30.6%
Majority		412	38.8%
Turnout		1,064	
Labour hold			

=== Broadfield South ===
Broadfield South
Party	Candidate	Votes	%
Labour	Colin Moffatt	645	57.5%
Conservative	Lee Gilroy	476	42.5%
Majority		169	15.0%
Turnout		1,121	
Labour gain from Conservative			

=== Gossops Green ===
Gossops Green
Party	Candidate	Votes	%
Labour	Chris Mullins	731	47.7%
Conservative	Beryl Mecrow	658	42.9%
BNP	Vernon Atkinson	91	5.9%
Liberal Democrats	Iain Dickson	54	3.5%
Majority		73	4.8%
Turnout		1,534	
Labour gain from Conservative			

=== Ifield ===
Ifield
Party	Candidate	Votes	%
Labour	Peter Smith	983	49.6%
Conservative	Ali Burke	660	33.3%
UKIP	Steven Wade	337	17.0%
Majority		323	16.3%
Turnout		1,980	
Labour gain from Conservative			

=== Langley Green ===
Langley Green
Party	Candidate	Votes	%
Labour	Brenda Smith	1,085	68.3%
Conservative	Richard Nixon	347	21.8%
UKIP	Gill Andrew	157	9.9%
Majority		738	46.5%
Turnout		1,589	
Labour hold			

=== Maidenbower ===
Maidenbower
Party	Candidate	Votes	%
Conservative	Duncan Peck	1,074	71.6%
Labour	Andrew Skudder	425	28.4%
Majority		649	43.2%
Turnout		1,499	
Conservative hold			

=== Pound Hill North ===
Pound Hill North
Party	Candidate	Votes	%
Conservative	Keith Brockwell	880	62.5%
Labour	Kultar Jogi	307	21.8%
Liberal Democrats	Richard Symonds	140	10.0%
UKIP	John Mac Canna	80	5.7%
Majority		573	40.7%
Turnout		1,407	
Conservative hold			

=== Pound Hill South and Worth ===
Pound Hill South and Worth
Party	Candidate	Votes	%
Conservative	Bob Lanzer	1,224	71.0%
Labour	Sina Adeniyi	499	29.0%
Majority		725	42.0%
Turnout		1,723	
Conservative hold			

=== Southgate ===
Southgate
Party	Candidate	Votes	%
Conservative	Liam Marshall-Ascough	920	44.5%
Labour	Raj Sharma	854	41.3%
Liberal Democrats	Malcolm Liles	294	14.2%
Majority		66	3.2%
Turnout		2,068	
Conservative hold			

=== Three Bridges ===
Three Bridges
Party	Candidate	Votes	%
Conservative	Brenda Burgess	875	54.6%
Labour	Samantha Bateman	728	45.4%
Majority		147	9.2%
Turnout		1,603	
Conservative hold			

=== Tilgate ===
Tilgate
Party	Candidate	Votes	%
Labour	Colin Lloyd	878	59.4%
Conservative	George O'Keefe	482	32.6%
Green	Derek Hardman	119	8.0%
Majority		396	26.8%
Turnout		1,479	
Labour hold			

- Note: This Tilgate seat was won by the Conservatives at the previous regular election in 2008, but gained by Labour in a by-election in 2010

=== West Green ===
West Green
Party	Candidate	Votes	%
Labour	Bill Ward	658	67.3%
Conservative	Chrissie Brown	320	32.7%
Majority		338	34.6%
Turnout		978	
Labour hold			
