= 2007 Crawley Borough Council election =

2007 UK local government election

← 2006	3 May 2007	2008 →

13 of the 37 seats to Crawley Borough Council 19 seats needed for a majority
	First party	Second party	Third party
Party	Conservative	Labour	Liberal Democrats
Last election	19	16	2
Seats before	18	16	3
Seats won	10	2	1
Seats after	22	12	3
Seat change	▲4	▼4	Steady
Popular vote	10,827	6,471	3,160
Percentage	48.4%	28.9%	14.1%
- Map showing the results of the 2007 Crawley Borough Council elections by ward. Red shows Labour seats, blue shows the Conservatives and yellow shows the Liberal Democrats. Wards in grey had no election.
Council control before election
No overall control
Council control after election
Conservative

The 2007 Crawley Borough Council election took place on 3 May 2007 to elect members of Crawley Borough Council in West Sussex, England. One third (13 out of 37 seats) of the council was up for election. The Conservatives regained overall control of the council, which they had won at the last election only for it to later fall under no overall control.

After the election, the composition of the council was:

- Conservative 22
- Labour 12
- Liberal Democrats 3

== Ward results ==
=== Bewbush ===
Bewbush
Party	Candidate	Votes	%
Labour	Christine Cheshire	776	55.4%
Conservative	Alex Maple	403	28.8%
Liberal Democrats	Muhammed Musoke	130	9.3%
Justice Party	Arshad Khan	92	6.6%
Majority		373	26.6%
Turnout		1,401	
Labour hold			

=== Furnace Green (2) ===
Furnace Green (2)
Party	Candidate	Votes	%
Conservative	Duncan Crow	1,062	28.5%
Conservative	Carol Eade	1,018	27.3%
Labour	Andrew Skudder	494	13.2%
Labour	TP Patel	450	12.1%
Liberal Democrats	Darren Wise	293	7.9%
BNP	Vernon Atkinson	228	6.1%
Green	Ben Liles	185	5.0%
Conservative hold			
Conservative hold			

=== Gossops Green ===
Gossops Green
Party	Candidate	Votes	%
Conservative	Keith Blake	736	48.5%
Labour	Chris Mullins	586	38.6%
Liberal Democrats	Michael Scott	197	13.0%
Majority		150	9.9%
Turnout		1,519	
Conservative hold			

=== Ifield ===
Ifield
Party	Candidate	Votes	%
Conservative	Daniel Kavanagh	885	37.3%
Labour	John Stanley	826	34.8%
BNP	George Baldwin	309	13.0%
Liberal Democrats	Edward Arnold	233	9.8%
Independent	Richard Symonds	87	3.7%
Independent	Daniel Capstick-Bedson	32	1.3%
Majority		59	2.5%
Turnout		2,372	
Conservative gain from Labour			

=== Langley Green ===
Langley Green
Party	Candidate	Votes	%
Labour	David Shreeves	780	45.4%
Conservative	Sukhjit Kaur	632	36.8%
Liberal Democrats	Kevin Osborne	307	17.9%
Majority		148	8.6%
Turnout		1,719	
Labour hold			

=== Maidenbower ===
Maidenbower
Party	Candidate	Votes	%
Conservative	Lenny Walker	1,439	78.8%
Labour	Ron Finch	224	12.3%
Liberal Democrats	Malcolm Wickins	164	9.0%
Majority		1,215	66.5%
Turnout		1,827	
Conservative hold			

=== Northgate ===
Northgate
Party	Candidate	Votes	%
Liberal Democrats	Gordon Seekings	538	45.5%
Labour	Bill Ward	288	24.3%
Conservative	Charles Skinner	210	17.8%
English Democrat	Mark Taylor	112	9.5%
Green	Derek Hardman	35	3.0%
Majority		250	21.2%
Turnout		1,183	
Liberal Democrats hold			

=== Pound Hill North ===
Pound Hill North
Party	Candidate	Votes	%
Conservative	Sally Blake	1,297	69.4%
Labour	Jasmine Samson	296	15.8%
Liberal Democrats	Sandy Ferguson	276	14.8%
Majority		1,001	53.6%
Turnout		1,869	
Conservative hold			

=== Pound Hill South and Worth ===
Pound Hill South and Worth
Party	Candidate	Votes	%
Conservative	Claire Denman	1,454	67.4%
Labour	Colin Moffatt	382	17.7%
Liberal Democrats	Edward Reay	321	14.9%
Majority		1,072	49.7%
Turnout		2,157	
Conservative hold			

=== Southgate ===
Southgate
Party	Candidate	Votes	%
Conservative	Jarnail Singh	900	38.9%
Labour	Ian Irvine	721	31.1%
Liberal Democrats	James Cotter	289	12.5%
BNP	Kevin Watt	235	10.1%
Green	Malcolm Liles	171	7.4%
Majority		179	7.8%
Turnout		2,316	
Conservative gain from Labour			

=== Three Bridges ===
Three Bridges
Party	Candidate	Votes	%
Conservative	Bob Burgess	905	47.3%
Labour	Daryl English	549	28.7%
Liberal Democrats	Barry Hamilton	289	15.1%
English Democrat	Mark Langston	91	4.8%
Green	Maris Liles	80	4.2%
Majority		356	18.6%
Turnout		1,914	
Conservative gain from Labour			

=== Tilgate ===
Tilgate
Party	Candidate	Votes	%
Conservative	Nigel Boxall	904	49.2%
Labour	Jayne Skudder	549	29.9%
BNP	Richard Trower	213	11.6%
Liberal Democrats	Roger McMurray	123	6.7%
Green	Vikki Dore	50	2.7%
Majority		355	19.3%
Turnout		1,839	
Conservative gain from Labour			
