= 2021 Crawley Borough Council election =

UK local election

2021 Crawley Borough Council Election
| ← 2019 | 6 May 2021 | 2022 → |

21 of the 36 seats to Crawley Borough Council 19 seats needed for a majority
| | First party | Second party | Third party |
|---|---|---|---|
| Party | Conservative | Labour | Independent |
| Seats before | 17 | 18 | 1 |
| Seats won | 1 | 0 | 0 |
| Seats after | 18 | 17 | 1 |
| Seat change | ▲1 | ▼1 | Steady |
| Popular vote | 14,909 | 12,129 | 287 |
| Percentage | 48.6% | 39.5% | 0.9% |
- Winner in each ward for the 2021 Crawley Borough Council election
Council control before election
No overall control
Council control after election
No overall control

The 2021 Crawley Borough Council election took place on 6 May 2021 to elect members of Crawley Borough Council in West Sussex, England. This was on the same day as other local elections.

== Results summary ==
2021 Crawley Borough Council election
| Party | This election | | | Full council | | | This election | | |
| Party | Seats | Net | Seats % | Other | Total | Total % | Votes | Votes % | +/− |
|---|---|---|---|---|---|---|---|---|---|
| Conservative | 8 | ▲1 | 57.1 | 10 | 18 | 50.0 | 14,909 | 48.6 | +2.1 |
| Labour | 6 | ▼1 | 42.9 | 11 | 17 | 47.2 | 12,129 | 39.5 | -7.5 |
| Independent | 0 | Steady | 0.0 | 1 | 1 | 2.8 | 287 | 0.9 | New |
| Green | 0 | Steady | 0.0 | 0 | 0 | 0.0 | 2,053 | 6.7 | +3.3 |
| Liberal Democrats | 0 | Steady | 0.0 | 0 | 0 | 0.0 | 1,270 | 4.1 | +1.7 |
| Reform UK | 0 | Steady | 0.0 | 0 | 0 | 0.0 | 59 | 0.2 | New |

== Ward results ==
=== Bewbush & North Broadfield ===
Bewbush & North Broadfield
| Party | Candidate | Votes | % | ±% |
|---|---|---|---|---|
| Labour | Michael Jones | 1,045 | 48.3 | +0.6 |
| Conservative | David Brades | 744 | 34.4 | +15.0 |
| Green | Richard Kail | 283 | 13.1 | −1.8 |
| Liberal Democrats | Shamsul Arfin | 92 | 4.3 | −3.7 |
| Majority | | 301 | 13.9 | |
| Turnout | | 2,164 | 29.7 | +5.7 |
| Labour hold | | Swing | ▼7.2 | |

=== Broadfield ===
Broadfield
| Party | Candidate | Votes | % | ±% |
|---|---|---|---|---|
| Labour | Kiran Khan | 1,095 | 49.7 | −10.7 |
| Conservative | Craig Burke | 964 | 43.7 | +4.1 |
| Liberal Democrats | Parveen Khan | 145 | 6.6 | N/A |
| Majority | | 131 | 6.0 | |
| Turnout | | 2,204 | 30.0 | +6.0 |
| Labour hold | | Swing | ▼7.4 | |

=== Gossops Green & North East Broadfield ===
Gossops Green & North East Broadfield
| Party | Candidate | Votes | % | ±% |
|---|---|---|---|---|
| Conservative | Zaker Ali | 1,014 | 50.8 | +9.8 |
| Labour | Tahira Rana | 737 | 36.9 | −4.7 |
| Green | Ben Fletcher | 113 | 5.7 | −7.9 |
| Liberal Democrats | May Champion | 73 | 3.7 | N/A |
| Reform UK | Colin Thornback | 59 | 3.0 | N/A |
| Majority | | 277 | 13.9 | |
| Turnout | | 1,996 | 41.6 | +8.6 |
| Conservative hold | | Swing | ▲7.3 | |

=== Ifield ===
Ifield
| Party | Candidate | Votes | % |
|---|---|---|---|
| Conservative | Josh Bounds | 1,157 | 43.2 |
| Labour | Sandra Buck | 967 | 36.1 |
| Conservative | Martin Stone | 938 | 35.1 |
| Labour | Jilly Hart | 935 | 34.9 |
| Green | Iain Dickson | 302 | 11.3 |
| Green | Sally-Claire Fadelle | 236 | 8.8 |
| Liberal Democrats | Lawrence Mallinson | 116 | 4.3 |
| Turnout | | 2,676 | 37.0 |
| Conservative gain from Labour | | | |
| Labour hold | | | |

=== Langley Green & Tushmore ===
Langley Green & Tushmore
| Party | Candidate | Votes | % | ±% |
|---|---|---|---|---|
| Labour | Susan Mullins | 1,001 | 48.3 | −12.1 |
| Conservative | Tahir Ashraf | 823 | 39.7 | +16.8 |
| Liberal Democrats | Mike Sargent | 248 | 12.0 | −4.7 |
| Majority | | 178 | 8.6 | |
| Turnout | | 2,072 | 34.2 | +6.2 |
| Labour hold | | Swing | ▼14.5 | |

=== Maidenbower ===
Maidenbower
| Party | Candidate | Votes | % | ±% |
|---|---|---|---|---|
| Conservative | Duncan Peck | 1,517 | 62.8 | −4.9 |
| Labour | Matt Pritchard | 557 | 23.0 | −9.3 |
| Green | Max Perry | 343 | 14.2 | N/A |
| Majority | | 960 | 39.8 | |
| Turnout | | 2,417 | 35.7 | +6.7 |
| Conservative hold | | Swing | ▲2.2 | |

=== Northgate & West Green ===
Northgate & West Green
| Party | Candidate | Votes | % | ±% |
|---|---|---|---|---|
| Labour | Smita Raja | 1,097 | 42.8 | +1.7 |
| Conservative | Jan Tarrant | 965 | 37.7 | +7.5 |
| Independent | Karen Sudan | 287 | 11.2 | N/A |
| Liberal Democrats | David Anderson | 213 | 8.3 | −5.1 |
| Majority | | 132 | 5.1 | |
| Turnout | | 2,562 | 33.5 | +1.5 |
| Labour hold | | Swing | ▼2.9 | |

=== Pound Hill North & Forge Wood ===
Pound Hill North & Forge Wood
| Party | Candidate | Votes | % | ±% |
|---|---|---|---|---|
| Conservative | Kevan McCarthy | 1,528 | 66.4 | +3.9 |
| Labour | Bob Noyce | 773 | 33.6 | +5.6 |
| Majority | | 755 | 32.8 | |
| Turnout | | 2,301 | 35.1 | +4.1 |
| Conservative hold | | Swing | ▼0.9 | |

=== Pound Hill South & Worth ===
Pound Hill South & Worth
| Party | Candidate | Votes | % | ±% |
|---|---|---|---|---|
| Conservative | Alison Pendlington | 1,469 | 58.4 | +9.0 |
| Labour | Olusina Adeniyi | 695 | 27.6 | −2.5 |
| Green | Cyril Gambrell | 272 | 10.8 | −9.7 |
| Liberal Democrats | Naeem Shahzad | 80 | 3.2 | N/A |
| Majority | | 774 | 30.8 | |
| Turnout | | 2,516 | 40.2 | +6.2 |
| Conservative hold | | Swing | ▲5.8 | |

=== Southgate ===
Southgate
| Party | Candidate | Votes | % | ±% |
|---|---|---|---|---|
| Conservative | Simon Piggott | 1,139 | 45.3 | +6.8 |
| Labour | Julian Charatan | 1,069 | 42.6 | −5.3 |
| Green | Robin Fitton | 167 | 6.6 | N/A |
| Liberal Democrats | Andrew Eastman | 137 | 5.5 | −8.0 |
| Majority | | 70 | 2.7 | |
| Turnout | | 2,512 | 38.8 | +4.8 |
| Conservative gain from Labour | | Swing | ▲6.1 | |

=== Three Bridges ===
Three Bridges
| Party | Candidate | Votes | % | ±% |
|---|---|---|---|---|
| Labour | Atif Nawaz | 1,099 | 44.2 | +9.3 |
| Conservative | Jonathan Purdy | 1,071 | 43.1 | −2.2 |
| Green | Danielle Kail | 205 | 8.3 | −11.4 |
| Liberal Democrats | Paul Taylor-Burr | 109 | 4.4 | N/A |
| Majority | | 28 | 1.1 | |
| Turnout | | 2,484 | 39.6 | +6.6 |
| Labour gain from Conservative | | Swing | ▲5.3 | |

=== Tilgate ===
Tilgate
| Party | Candidate | Votes | % |
|---|---|---|---|
| Conservative | Michelle Morris | 808 | 49.4 |
| Conservative | Maureen Mwagale | 772 | 47.2 |
| Labour | Carlos Castro | 569 | 34.8 |
| Labour | Kerry-Anne Flynn | 490 | 29.9 |
| Green | Tom Coombes | 132 | 8.1 |
| Liberal Democrats | Harry Old | 57 | 3.5 |
| Turnout | | 1,637 | 36.7 |
| Conservative hold | | | |
| Conservative hold | | | |
