= 2014 Crawley Borough Council election =

2014 UK local government election

← 2012	22 May 2014	2015 →

13 of the 37 seats to Crawley Borough Council 19 seats needed for a majority
	First party	Second party	Third party
Party	Labour	Conservative	UKIP
Last election	16	21	0
Seats before	16	20^{†}	1^{†}
Seats won	8	5	0
Seats after	20	16	1
Seat change	▲4	▼4	Steady
Popular vote	8,653	8,083	5,297
Percentage	37.4%	35.0%	22.9%
- Map showing the results of the 2014 Crawley Borough Council elections by ward. Blue show Conservative seats, and red shows Labour. Wards in grey had no election.^{†} One Conservative councillor defected to UKIP in 2013.
Council control before election
Conservative
Council control after election
Labour

The 2014 Crawley Borough Council election took place on 22 May 2014 to elect members of Crawley Borough Council in West Sussex, England. This was on the same day as other local elections.

One third of the council was up for election and the Labour Party gained control of the council.

After the election, the composition of the council was:

- Labour 20 (+4)
- Conservative 16 (-4)
- United Kingdom Independence Party 1

== Ward results ==
=== Bewbush ===
Bewbush
Party	Candidate	Votes	%
Labour	Michael Jones	891	
UKIP	Casey Lavington	515	
Conservative	Tina Belben	370	
Justice Party	Arshad Khan	61	
Turnout			28.9%

=== Broadfield North ===
Broadfield North
Party	Candidate	Votes	%
Labour	Ian Irvine	779	
UKIP	Christopher Brown	348	
Conservative	Corinne Bowen	292	
Socialist Labour	Derek Isaacs	30	
Turnout			31.0%

=== Broadfield South ===
Broadfield South
Party	Candidate	Votes	%
Labour	Tim Lunnon	650	
UKIP	Mia Bristow	439	
Conservative	David Bowen	386	
Turnout			32.6%

=== Furnace Green ===
Furnace Green
Party	Candidate	Votes	%
Conservative	Carole Eade	866	
Labour	Andrew Skudder	525	
UKIP	Alan Griffiths	465	
Liberal Democrats	David Anderson	101	
Turnout			43.5%

=== Ifield ===
Ifield
Party	Candidate	Votes	%
Labour	John Stanley	995	
Conservative	Martin Stone	758	
UKIP	Steven Wade	668	
Independent	Richard Symonds	143	
Turnout			38.0%

=== Langley Green ===
Langley Green
Party	Candidate	Votes	%
Labour	Stephen Joyce	1,078	
UKIP	Sharon Kennett	471	
Conservative	Andrew Jagger	333	
Liberal Democrats	Kevin Osborne	101	
Turnout			33.2%

=== Maidenbower ===
Maidenbower
Party	Candidate	Votes	%
Conservative	Ken Trussell	1,114	
Labour	Julian Charatan	508	
UKIP	Simon Darroch	468	
Turnout			31.8%

=== Northgate ===
Northgate
Party	Candidate	Votes	%
Labour	Peter Keir Lamb	821	
Conservative	Ray Ward	521	
Turnout			34.5%

=== Pound Hill North ===
Pound Hill North
Party	Candidate	Votes	%
Conservative	Richard Burrett	1,059	
Labour	Robbie Sharma	362	
Liberal Democrats	Valerie Spooner	110	
Turnout			37.9%

=== Pound Hill South and Worth ===
Pound Hill South and Worth
Party	Candidate	Votes	%
Conservative	Howard Bloom	1,250	
Conservative	Beryl Mecrow	1,102	
Labour	Gillian Joyce	556	
Labour	Jason Vine	462	
Liberal Democrats	Nicholas Dennis	252	
Turnout			37.8%

=== Southgate ===
Southgate
Party	Candidate	Votes	%
Labour	Raj Sharma	888	
Conservative	Jan Tarrant	823	
Independent	Mike Pickett	228	
Turnout			38.3%

=== West Green ===
West Green
Party	Candidate	Votes	%
Labour	Karen Sudan	590	
Conservative	Vanessa Cumper	321	
UKIP	Alison Burke	311	
Liberal Democrats	Elke Smith	69	
Turnout			34.9%
