= Crawley Town Hall =

Municipal building in Crawley, England

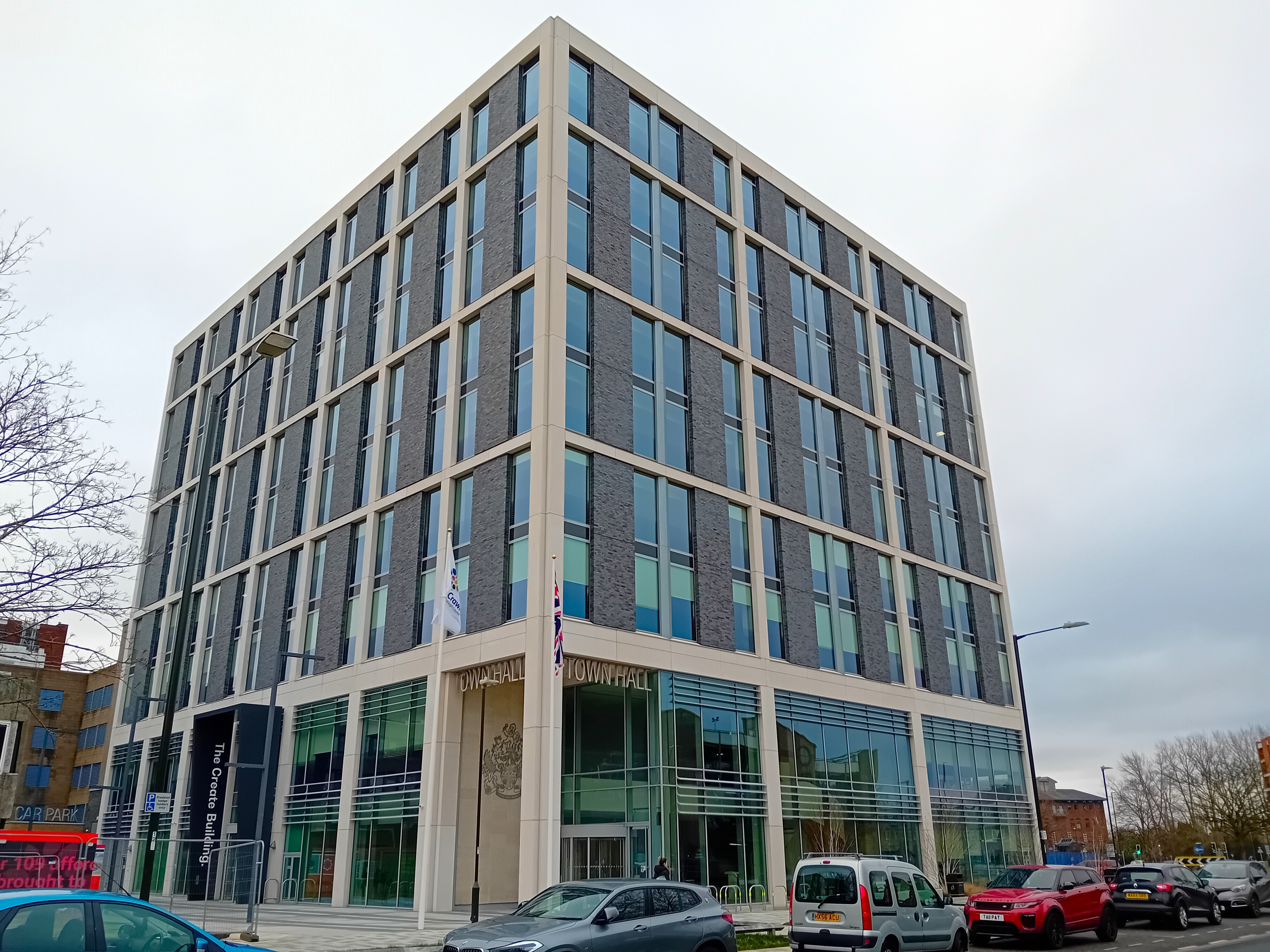
- The new town hall

- Shown in West Sussex
- 51.1169°N 0.1839°W
- Location: The Boulevard, Crawley

Site notes
- Architect: Cartwright Pickard
- Architectural style: International Style

Crawley Town Hall is a municipal structure in The Boulevard, Crawley, West Sussex, England. It was completed in 2023 and serves as the headquarters of Crawley Borough Council.

== History ==
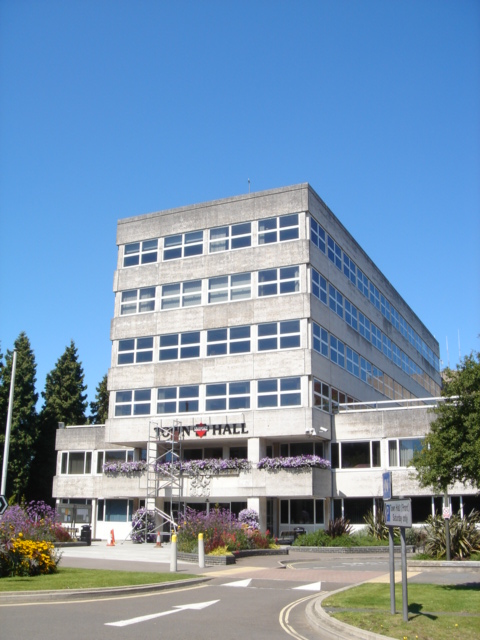
The old town hall

Active demolition site of the old town hall

Following significant population growth associated with the development of the new town, Crawley became an urban district in 1956. The new council leaders decided to commission a town hall and acquired a site on the north side of The Boulevard from Crawley Development Corporation in May 1958. The building was designed by Max Clendinning of Brown Henson & Partners in the Brutalist style, built in concrete and glass and was officially opened by the Secretary of State for Education and Science, Michael Stewart on 14 November 1964.

The design of the old town hall involved a six-storey block which was canted forward over the main entrance and also extended to the rear behind the front elevation. It was attached to the east, via a long low-rise connecting block, to an auditorium known as the "Civic Hall". The complex was faced with alternating bands of concrete and windows. The principal room in the town hall was the council chamber, which was furnished in a minimalist style. The rock band, The Who, performed in the civic hall in April 1965.

In February 2017, council leaders decided that the old complex was no longer fit-for-purpose and, despite a petition to save it, they initiated demolition of the complex in January 2020. They also signed a contract for a new town hall to be erected on the site of the old civic hall. Construction on the new building began in spring 2020.

The new building was designed by Cartwright Pickard in the International Style, built by Kier Group in concrete and glass. The design involved a nine-storey square-shaped building: the lower storeys were reserved for municipal use while the upper storeys made available for commercial tenants. At the southwest corner of the building, the lower two floors were recessed to create an entrance and a large carving of the borough coat of arms was installed there in August 2022. The new building was formally opened on 21 March 2023.
