= 2004 Crawley Borough Council election =

2004 UK local government election

← 2003	10 June 2004	2006 →

All 37 seats to Crawley Borough Council 19 seats needed for a majority
	First party	Second party	Third party
Party	Labour	Conservative	Liberal Democrats
Seats before	22	8	2
Seats won	19	16	2
Seat change	▼3	▲8	Steady
Popular vote	8,749	10,097	3,549
Percentage	33.1%	38.2%	13.4%
- Map showing the results of the 2004 Crawley Borough Council elections by ward. Red shows Labour seats, blue shows the Conservatives and yellow shows the Liberal Democrats Striped wards indicate mixed representation.
Council control before election
Labour
Council control after election
Labour

The 2004 Crawley Borough Council election took place on 10 June 2004 to elect members of Crawley Borough Council in West Sussex, England. Boundary changes had taken place, so the entire council was up for election. The Labour Party stayed in overall control of the council, albeit with a majority of just one seat.

After the election, the composition of the council was:

- Labour 19
- Conservative 16
- Liberal Democrats 2

== Ward results ==
=== Bewbush (3) ===
Bewbush (3 seats)
Party	Candidate	Votes	%
Labour	Doug Murdoch	718	
Labour	Christine Cheshire	659	
Labour	Christopher Redmayne	636	
Conservative	Helen Burke	443	
Conservative	Louise Henry	387	
Conservative	Adam Brown	368	
Green	Victoria Dore	276	
Justice Party	Arshad Khan	183	

=== Broadfield North (2) ===
Broadfield North (2 seats)
Party	Candidate	Votes	%
Labour	Brian Quinn	665	
Labour	Thakordas Patel	503	
Conservative	Corinne Brown	404	
Conservative	David Noir	381	

=== Broadfield South (2) ===
Broadfield South (2 seats)
Party	Candidate	Votes	%
Conservative	Marcella Head	405	
Conservative	Alan Quirk	375	
Labour	Andrew Skudder	353	
Labour	James McGough	336	
Green	Philippa Emott	180	

=== Furnace Green (2) ===
Furnace Green (2 seats)
Party	Candidate	Votes	%
Conservative	Duncan Crow	849	
Conservative	Kirstie Neal	686	
Labour	Geraldine Hooten	531	
Liberal Democrats	David Barry	514	
Labour	Jayne Skudder	456	
Liberal Democrats	Roger McMurray	400	
BNP	Vernon Atkinson	285	
Green	Colin Maughan	200	

=== Gossops Green (2) ===
Gossops Green (2 seats)
Party	Candidate	Votes	%
Conservative	Beryl Mecrow	659	
Conservative	Brian Blake	645	
Labour	Christopher Mullins	612	
Labour	William Ward	496	
Liberal Democrats	Ann Gomeze	196	
Liberal Democrats	Clayton Gomeze	178	
Green	Ben Liles	141	

=== Ifield (3) ===
Ifield (3 seats)
Party	Candidate	Votes	%
Labour	John Mortimer	764	
Labour	Bernard Clay	673	
Labour	John Stanley	669	
Conservative	Joan Moore	573	
Conservative	Trevor Shaw	565	
Conservative	Andrew Belben	499	
BNP			
Liberal Democrats	Barry Hamilton	394	
Liberal Democrats	Andrew Beckett	355	
Independent	Richard Symonds	341	

=== Langley Green (3) ===
Langley Green (3 seats)
Party	Candidate	Votes	%
Labour	Brenda Smith	792	
Labour	David Shreeves	743	
Labour	James Smith	708	
Conservative	Charles Skinner	440	
Conservative	Leonard Pellett	436	
Liberal Democrats	Kevin Osborne	421	
Conservative	Reginald Hawksworth	397	
Liberal Democrats	Michael Scott	348	
Green	Rudolph Affolter	247	

=== Maidenbower (3) ===
Maidenbower (3 seats)
Party	Candidate	Votes	%
Conservative	Jennifer Millar-Smith	1,115	
Conservative	Lenworth Walker	1,080	
Conservative	Brenda Brockwell	1,018	
Labour	Raymond Calcott	336	
Liberal Democrats	Darren Wise	321	
Labour	Josephine McQuade	318	
Liberal Democrats	Peter Bannister	312	
Labour	Ronald Finch	299	

=== Northgate (2) ===
Northgate (2 seats)
Party	Candidate	Votes	%
Liberal Democrats	Gordon Seekings	610	
Liberal Democrats	Linda Seekings	568	
Labour	Jean Calcott	276	
Labour	Barry Richards	268	
Conservative	John Blakeman	218	
Conservative	Christine Townsend	190	

=== Pound Hill North (3) ===
Pound Hill North (2 seats)
Party	Candidate	Votes	%
Conservative	Keith Brockwell	1,331	
Conservative	Sally Blake	1,295	
Conservative	Richard Burrett	1,278	
Labour	Colin Moffatt	500	
Labour	Denise Clewer	459	
Labour	Dawn Powell	449	

=== Pound Hill South and Worth (3) ===
Pound Hill South and Worth (3 seats)
Party	Candidate	Votes	%
Conservative	Robert Lanzer	1,291	
Conservative	Claire Denman	1,223	
Conservative	Lee Burke	1,170	
Labour	Alison Cornell	463	
Labour	Jack Harris	441	
Labour	Hasu Mehta	428	
Liberal Democrats	Edward Reay	415	
Green	Cyril Gambrell	338	

=== Southgate (3) ===
Southgate (3 seats)
Party	Candidate	Votes	%
Labour	Stephen Joyce	722	
Labour	Ian Irvine	721	
Labour	Aneel Sharma	674	
Conservative	Stephen Beaumont	671	
Conservative	Barbara Wright	605	
Conservative	Gurdev Kalsi	554	
Liberal Democrats	Jonathan Bonner	438	
Green	Malcolm Liles	409	
Green	Joelle Dumetz	369	
BNP	Richard Trower	294	

=== Three Bridges (2) ===
Three Bridges (2 seats)
Party	Candidate	Votes	%
Conservative	Brenda Burgess	679	
Labour	Daryl Barnes-Austin	637	
Conservative	John Rolf	589	
Labour	Payal Patel	516	
Liberal Democrats	Victoria Seekings	240	
BNP	Ryan Grice	221	
Liberal Democrats	Howard Llewelyn	210	
Green	Maris Liles	149	

=== Tilgate (2) ===
Tilgate (2 seats)
Party	Candidate	Votes	%
Labour	Colin Lloyd	748	
Labour	Samantha Cleeve	745	
Conservative	Alexander Maple	661	
Conservative	Christina Belben	645	

=== West Green (2) ===
West Green (2 seats)
Party	Candidate	Votes	%
Labour	Albert Crane	632	
Labour	Robert Hull	505	
Conservative	Georgina Hook	358	
Conservative	Faith Tamkin	322	
Green	Anthony Graham	264	
