= 2008 Crawley Borough Council election =

2008 UK local government election

← 2007	1 May 2008	2010 →

13 of the 37 seats to Crawley Borough Council 19 seats needed for a majority
	First party	Second party	Third party
Party	Conservative	Labour	Liberal Democrats
Seats before	22	12	3
Seats won	9	4	0
Seats after	26	9	2
Seat change	▲4	▼3	▼1
Popular vote	11,483	7,329	1,674
Percentage	52.0%	33.2%	7.6%
- Map showing the results of the 2008 Crawley Borough Council elections by ward. Blue show Conservative seats, and red shows Labour. Wards in grey had no election.
Council control before election
Conservative
Council control after election
Conservative

The 2008 Crawley Borough Council election took place on 1 May 2008 to elect members of Crawley Borough Council in West Sussex, England. One third of the council was up for election. The Conservative Party retained overall control of the council.

After the election, the composition of the council was:

- Conservative 22
- Labour 12
- Liberal Democrats 3

== Ward results ==
=== Bewbush ===
Bewbush
Party	Candidate	Votes	%
Labour	Marion Ayling	710	48.0%
Conservative	Alex Maple	429	29.0%
BNP	Linda Atkinson	231	15.6%
Justice Party	Arshad Khan	108	7.3%
Majority		281	19.0%
Turnout		1,478	
Labour hold			

=== Broadfield North ===
Broadfield North
Party	Candidate	Votes	%
Labour	Brian Quinn	622	51.6%
Conservative	David Bowen	472	39.1%
Liberal Democrats	Robert Huston	112	9.3%
Majority		150	12.5%
Turnout		1,206	
Labour hold			

=== Broadfield South ===
Broadfield South
Party	Candidate	Votes	%
Conservative	Lee Gilroy	668	57.0%
Labour	Ian Irvine	503	43.0%
Majority		165	14.0%
Turnout		1,171	
Conservative hold			

=== Gossops Green ===
Gossops Green
Party	Candidate	Votes	%
Conservative	Beryl Mecrow	766	48.0%
Labour	Chris Mullins	498	31.2%
BNP	Dennis Kenealy	242	15.2%
Liberal Democrats	Gomeze Clayton	89	5.6%
Majority		268	16.8%
Turnout		1,595	
Conservative hold			

=== Ifield ===
Ifield
Party	Candidate	Votes	%
Conservative	Ali Burke	984	42.7%
Labour	John Stanley	748	32.4%
BNP	George Baldwin	363	15.7%
Liberal Democrats	Edward Arnold	211	9.2%
Majority		236	10.3%
Turnout		2,306	
Conservative gain from Labour			

=== Langley Green ===
Langley Green
Party	Candidate	Votes	%
Labour	Brenda Smith	954	52.1%
Conservative	Tony Pushpanathan	722	39.4%
Liberal Democrats	Muhammed Musoke	156	8.5%
Majority		232	12.7%
Turnout		1,832	
Labour hold			

=== Maidenbower ===
Maidenbower
Party	Candidate	Votes	%
Conservative	Jennifer Millar-Smith	1,552	82.4%
Liberal Democrats	Kevin Osborne	166	8.8%
Labour	Raj Sharma	166	8.8%
Majority		1,386	73.6%
Turnout		1,884	
Conservative hold			

=== Pound Hill North ===
Pound Hill North
Party	Candidate	Votes	%
Conservative	Keith Brockwell	1,349	72.6%
Liberal Democrats	Eddie Reay	267	14.4%
Labour	Thakordas Patel	242	13.0%
Majority		1,082	58.2%
Turnout		1,858	
Conservative hold			

=== Pound Hill South and Worth ===
Pound Hill South and Worth
Party	Candidate	Votes	%
Conservative	Bob Lanzer	1,482	68.7%
Labour	Colin Moffatt	293	13.6%
Liberal Democrats	Malcolm Wickins	196	9.1%
BNP	Vernon Atkinson	186	8.6%
Majority		1,189	55.1%
Turnout		2,157	
Conservative hold			

=== Southgate ===
Southgate
Party	Candidate	Votes	%
Conservative	Sukhjit Kaur	1,040	48.4%
Labour	Stephen Joyce	786	36.6%
Liberal Democrats	Darren Wise	323	15.0%
Majority		254	11.8%
Turnout		2,149	
Conservative gain from Labour			

=== Three Bridges ===
Three Bridges
Party	Candidate	Votes	%
Conservative	Brenda Burgess	893	54.4%
Labour	Chris Oxlade	596	36.3%
Liberal Democrats	Siobhan Hoverd	154	9.4%
Majority		297	18.1%
Turnout		1,643	
Conservative hold			

=== Tilgate ===
Tilgate
Party	Candidate	Votes	%
Conservative	Lawrence Taylor	725	44.6%
Labour	Geraint Thomas	627	38.6%
BNP	Richard Trower	274	16.9%
Majority		98	6.0%
Turnout		1,626	
Conservative gain from Labour			

=== West Green ===
West Green
Party	Candidate	Votes	%
Labour	Bert Crane	584	50.1%
Conservative	Tina Belben	401	34.4%
BNP	Stuart Minihane	180	15.5%
Majority		183	15.7%
Turnout		1,165	
Labour hold			
