= 2026 Crawley Borough Council election =

2026 English local government election

- 7 May 2026

13 out of 36 seats to Crawley Borough Council (including 1 by-election) 19 seats needed for a majority
- Registered: 79,572
- Turnout: 33,743; 42.4%
	First party	Second party	Third party
Leader	Michael Jones	None	Duncan Crow
Party	Labour	Reform	Conservative
Last election	25 seats, 46.8%	Did not stand	11 seats, 34.9%
Seats before	26	1	9
Seats won	3	10	0
Seats after	21	11	4
Seat change	▼5	▲10	▼5
Popular vote	8,951	12,094	7,508
Percentage	24.7%	33.4%	20.8%
Swing	▼22.1%	N/A	▼14.1%
- Winner of each seat at the 2026 Crawley Borough Council election.
Leader before election
Michael Jones
Labour
Leader after election
Michael Jones
Labour

The 2026 Crawley Borough Council election took place on 7 May 2026 to elect members of Crawley Borough Council in West Sussex, England. There were 13 of the 36 seats on the council up for election on this occasion, being the usual third of the council plus a by-election. This was on the same day as other local elections.

Reform UK won 10 of the 13 seats contested at this election, but Labour retained its overall majority on the council.

== Summary ==
=== Election result ===
2026 Crawley Borough Council election
Party	This election				Full council			This election		
Party	Candidates	Seats	Net	Seats %	Other	Total	Total %	Votes	Votes %	+/−
Labour	{{{candidates}}}	3	▼5	23.1	18	21	58.3	8,951	24.7	–22.1
Reform	{{{candidates}}}	10	▲10	76.9	1	11	30.6	12,094	33.4	N/A
Conservative	{{{candidates}}}	0	▼5	0.0	4	4	11.1	7,508	20.8	–14.1
Green	{{{candidates}}}	0	Steady	0.0	0	0	0.0	5,492	15.2	+4.2
Liberal Democrats	{{{candidates}}}	0	Steady	0.0	0	0	0.0	1,677	4.6	N/A
Independent	{{{candidates}}}	0	Steady	0.0	0	0	0.0	320	0.9	–1.4
TUSC	{{{candidates}}}	0	Steady	0.0	0	0	0.0	141	0.4	–2.8

== Incumbents ==
Ward	Incumbent councillor	Party	Re-standing
Bewbush & North Broadfield	Sharmila Sivarajah	Labour	Yes
Broadfield	Tim Lunnon	Labour	Yes
Furnace Green	Hazel Hellier	Conservative	Yes
Ifield	Jilly Hart	Labour	Yes
Langley Green & Tushmore	Tahira Rana	Labour	Yes
Maidenbower	Imtiaz Khan	Conservative	Yes
Northgate & West Green	Gurinder Jhans	Labour	No
Pound Hill North & Forge Wood	Tina Belben	Conservative	Yes (Note: Standing in Bewbush & North Broadfield.)
Pound Hill South & Worth	Bob Lanzer	Conservative	Yes
Southgate	Yasmin Khan	Labour	Yes
Three Bridges	Steve Pritchard	Labour	No
Tilgate	Maureen Mwagale	Conservative	No

== Candidates ==
=== Total Standing ===
Party	Candidates
Labour Party*	13
Conservative Party	13
Green Party	13
Liberal Democrats	9
Reform UK	13
TUSC	6
Independent	1

*1 Labour candidate is running under 'Labour and the Cooperative Party'

=== Buwbush & North Broadfield ===
Bewbush & North Broadfield
Party	Candidate	Votes	%	±%
Reform	Ian Butler	860	32.6	N/A
Labour	Sharmila Sivarajah*	809	30.6	–20.7
Conservative	Tina Belben*	390	14.8	–8.4
Green	Ryan Rooke	390	14.8	+0.8
Liberal Democrats	Lawrence Mallinson	151	5.7	N/A
TUSC	Robin Burnham	40	1.5	–5.1
Majority		51	2.0	N/A
Turnout		2,661	36.7	+11.6
Registered electors		7,241		
Reform gain from Labour				

=== Broadfield ===
Marie Mariette was the first Chagossian councillor to be elected in the UK.

Broadfield
Party	Candidate	Votes	%	±%
Reform	Marie Mariette	980	36.2	N/A
Labour	Tim Lunnon*	803	29.6	–24.9
Conservative	David Bowen	420	15.5	–12.9
Green	Carolina Rodrigues-Braga	354	13.1	N/A
Liberal Democrats	Rachael Colbran	153	5.6	N/A
Majority		177	6.6	N/A
Turnout		2,735	36.6	+12.0
Registered electors		7,473		
Reform gain from Labour				

=== Furnace Green ===
Furnace Green
Party	Candidate	Votes	%	±%
Reform	Sarah Letissier	761	33.9	+27.2
Conservative	Hazel Hellier*	630	28.0	–20.4
Labour	Younis Ainine	457	20.3	–24.6
Green	Tim Peacock	254	11.3	N/A
Liberal Democrats	Kevin Osborne	144	6.4	N/A
Majority		131	5.9	N/A
Turnout		2,254	49.0	+6.0
Registered electors		4,596		
Reform gain from Conservative		Swing	▲23.8	

=== Ifield ===
Ifield
Party	Candidate	Votes	%	±%
Reform	Grainne Conway	1,180	39.0	N/A
Labour	Jilly Hart*	752	24.9	–25.7
Conservative	Valerie Knight	387	12.8	–20.5
Green	Ines Manning	368	12.2	+1.1
Independent	Richard Symonds	320	10.6	N/A
TUSC	Asim Hussain	19	0.6	–4.5
Majority		428	14.1	N/A
Turnout		3,042	41.9	+12.9
Registered electors		7,260		
Reform gain from Labour				

=== Langley Green & Tushmore ===
Langley Green & Tushmore
Party	Candidate	Votes	%	±%
Labour	Tahira Rana*	750	32.5	–12.6
Reform	Oliver Pickstock	687	29.8	N/A
Green	Laura Menezes	403	17.5	N/A
Conservative	Alan Hellier	323	14.0	–11.9
Liberal Democrats	Kemuel Thompson	121	5.2	N/A
TUSC	Lewis Earthrowl-Gould	21	0.9	N/A
Majority		63	2.7	–13.4
Turnout		2,323	37.8	+10.3
Registered electors		6,138		
Labour hold				

=== Maidenbower ===
Maidenbower
Party	Candidate	Votes	%	±%
Reform	Riszard Rzepa	1,127	35.6	N/A
Conservative	Imtiaz Khan*	789	24.9	–19.0
Green	Max Perry	526	16.6	–12.1
Labour Co-op	Stephen Pritchard	398	12.6	–14.8
Liberal Democrats	Sarah Smith	330	10.4	N/A
Majority		338	10.7	N/A
Turnout		3,176	46.9	+15.1
Registered electors		6,774		
Reform gain from Conservative				

=== Northgate & West Green ===
Northgate & West Green
Party	Candidate	Votes	%	±%
Reform	Mitchall Whiston	1,038	34.1	N/A
Labour	Nicky Ascenso	835	27.4	–26.1
Green	Nick Park	510	16.8	+4.3
Conservative	Susan Wheeler	435	14.3	–14.6
Liberal Democrats	David Anderson	213	7.0	N/A
TUSC	Pat Gedge	13	0.4	–4.7
Majority		203	6.7	N/A
Turnout		3,044	38.6	+9.6
Registered electors		7,886		
Reform gain from Labour				

=== Pound Hill North & Forge Wood ===
Pound Hill North & Forge Wood
Party	Candidate	Votes	%	±%
Reform	James Tidy	1,131	31.9	N/A
Conservative	Paul Castle	907	25.5	–14.8
Labour	Zahid Raja	793	22.3	–26.8
Green	Neal Murdoch	515	14.5	+5.1
Liberal Democrats	Fidel Kuzamba	204	5.7	N/A
Majority		224	6.4	N/A
Turnout		3,565	46.4	+12.1
Registered electors		7,678		
Reform gain from Conservative				

=== Pound Hill South & Worth ===
Pound Hill South & Worth
Party	Candidate	Votes	%	±%
Reform	Bob Laycock	960	30.71	N/A
Conservative	Bob Lanzer*	959	30.68	–21.1
Labour	Flynn Cowell	560	17.9	–16.1
Green	Heidi James-Dunbar	476	15.2	+3.6
Liberal Democrats	Theo van der Lugt	171	5.5	N/A
Majority		1	0.03	N/A
Turnout		3,139	50.0	+15.5
Registered electors		6,281		
Reform gain from Conservative				

=== Southgate ===
Southgate
Party	Candidate	Votes	%	±%
Reform	Tim Charters	963	33.6	N/A
Conservative	Zack Ali	737	25.7	–11.6
Labour	Yasmin Khan*	686	23.9	–22.3
Green	Robin Fitton	459	16.0	+3.2
TUSC	Bret Shattock	24	0.8	–2.9
Majority		226	7.9	N/A
Turnout		2,882	42.3	+12.3
Registered electors		6,818		
Reform gain from Labour				

=== Three Bridges ===
Three Bridges (2 seats due to by-election)
Party	Candidate	Votes	%	±%
Labour	Marilyn Hilton	875	31.9	–19.5
Labour	Mandle Hains	821	29.9	–21.5
Reform	Callum Johnson	782	28.5	N/A
Reform	Georgia-Mae Pocock	762	27.7	N/A
Conservative	Jonathan Purdy	612	22.3	–10.3
Green	Tom Wiggins	496	18.1	+9.4
Green	Lekan Babalola	466	17.0	+8.3
Conservative	Omar Shafiq	465	16.9	–15.7
Liberal Democrats	Stephanie Robinson	190	6.9	N/A
TUSC	Tim Holt	24	0.9	–2.7
Turnout		2,880	42.0	+5.1
Registered electors		6,859		
Labour hold				
Labour hold				

=== Tilgate ===
Tilgate
Party	Candidate	Votes	%	±%
Reform	Emma Whiteoak	863	43.1	N/A
Conservative	Tarek Miah	454	22.7	–13.9
Labour	Tony Patel	412	20.6	–28.1
Green	Hazel Mehmet	275	13.7	+5.7
Majority		409	20.4	N/A
Turnout		2,016	44.1	+10.4
Registered electors		4,568		
Reform gain from Conservative				
