= 2024 Crawley Borough Council election =

English local election

← 2023	2 May 2024	2026 →

12 out of 36 seats to Crawley Borough Council 19 seats needed for a majority

	First party	Second party
Leader	Michael Jones	Duncan Crow
Party	Labour	Conservative
Leader's seat	Bewbush & North Broadfield	Furnace Green
Last election	20 seats, 47.6%	16 seats, 40.2%
Seats before	20	16
Seats after	25	11
Seat change	▲5	▼5
- Winner of each seat at the 2024 Crawley Borough Council election
Leader before election
Michael Jones
Labour
Leader after election
Michael Jones
Labour

The 2024 Crawley Borough Council election took place on 2 May 2024 to elect members of Crawley Borough Council in West Sussex, England. This was on the same day as other local elections.

The Labour Party tightened their control of the council to a comfortable working majority of 14, gaining several seats from the Conservatives. Despite multiple other parties fielding several candidates in Crawley's wards, no other party won any seats.

== Summary ==
=== Election result ===
2024 Crawley Borough Council election
Party	This election			Full council			This election		
Party	Seats	Net	Seats %	Other	Total	Total %	Votes	Votes %	+/−
Labour	10	▲5	83.3	15	25	69.4	11,242	46.8	–0.8
Conservative	2	▼5	16.7	9	11	30.6	8,383	34.9	–5.3
Green	0	Steady	0.0	0	0	0.0	2,636	11.0	+2.3
TUSC	0	Steady	0.0	0	0	0.0	776	3.2	+3.1
Independent	0	Steady	0.0	0	0	0.0	558	2.3	+1.7
Heritage	0	Steady	0.0	0	0	0.0	306	1.3	+0.5
Freedom Alliance	0	Steady	0.0	0	0	0.0	69	0.3	N/A
JAC	0	Steady	0.0	0	0	0.0	38	0.2	N/A

== Ward results ==
The Statement of Persons Nominated, which details the candidates standing in each ward, was released by Crawley Borough Council following the close of nominations on 8 April 2024. Sitting councillors standing for re-election are marked with an asterisk (*).

=== Bewbush & North Broadfield ===
Bewbush & North Broadfield
Party	Candidate	Votes	%	±%
Labour	Michael Jones*	920	51.3	−4.4
Conservative	Tony Johnson	416	23.2	+0.6
Green	Holly Smith	251	14.0	+3.0
TUSC	Robin Burnham	119	6.6	−2.6
Heritage	Dan Weir	50	2.8	+1.3
JAC	Arshad Khan	38	2.1	N/A
Majority				
Turnout		1,816	25.1	
Registered electors		7,230		
Labour hold		Swing		

=== Broadfield ===
Broadfield
Party	Candidate	Votes	%	±%
Labour Co-op	Kiran Khan*	979	54.5	−0.1
Conservative	Valerie Knight	509	28.4	−1.4
Heritage	Carolina Morra	174	9.7	+3.4
TUSC	Christopher Ellis	133	7.4	+5.5
Majority				
Turnout		1,816	24.6	
Registered electors		7,384		
Labour Co-op hold		Swing		

=== Gossops Green & North East Broadfield ===
Gossops Green & North East Broadfield
Party	Candidate	Votes	%	±%
Labour	Esther Barrott	914	51.6	−1.5
Conservative	Anwaera Perveen	557	31.5	−3.4
Green	Iain Dickson	191	10.8	−1.3
Heritage	Debbie Plaister	82	4.6	N/A
TUSC	Mark Wright	26	1.5	N/A
Majority				
Turnout		1,780	38.0	
Registered electors		4,683		
Labour gain from Conservative		Swing		

=== Ifield ===
Ifield
Party	Candidate	Votes	%	±%
Labour Co-op	Beni Yianni	1,046	50.6	+4.3
Conservative	Jonathan Purdy	688	33.3	−5.7
Green	Ines Manning	229	11.1	+1.5
TUSC	Winifred Duggan	105	5.1	N/A
Majority				
Turnout		2,088	29.0	
Registered electors		7,202		
Labour Co-op hold		Swing		

=== Langley Green & Tushmore ===
Langley Green & Tushmore
Party	Candidate	Votes	%	±%
Labour Co-op	Shelly Bushnell	722	45.1	−18.5
Independent	Karen Sudan	465	29.0	N/A
Conservative	Alan Hellier	414	25.9	−10.5
Majority				
Turnout		1,675	27.3	
Registered electors		6,132		
Labour Co-op hold		Swing		

=== Maidenbower ===
Maidenbower
Party	Candidate	Votes	%	±%
Conservative	Dominic Ramsay	940	43.9	−7.6
Green	Max Perry	614	28.7	+1.0
Labour	Matt Pritchard	586	27.4	+6.6
Majority				
Turnout		2,159	31.8	
Registered electors		6,799		
Conservative hold		Swing		

=== Northgate & West Green ===
Northgate & West Green
Party	Candidate	Votes	%	±%
Labour Co-op	Sue Mullins*	1,188	53.5	−1.1
Conservative	Alison Pendlington*	641	28.9	−4.5
Green	Nicholas Park	278	12.5	+0.5
TUSC	Peter Miller	113	5.1	N/A
Majority				
Turnout		2,242	29.0	
Registered electors		7,741		
Labour Co-op hold		Swing		

=== Pound Hill North & Forge Wood ===
Pound Hill North & Forge Wood
Party	Candidate	Votes	%	±%
Labour Co-op	Nicholas Hilton	1,236	49.1	−4.5
Conservative	Paul Castle	1,014	40.3	−6.1
Green	Neal Murdoch	236	9.4	N/A
TUSC	Ben Newman	31	1.2	N/A
Majority				
Turnout		2,530	34.3	
Registered electors		7,372		
Labour Co-op hold		Swing		

=== Pound Hill South & Worth ===
Pound Hill South & Worth
Party	Candidate	Votes	%	±%
Conservative	Thomas Bidwell	1,099	51.8	+3.9
Labour	Tony Patel	721	34.0	−6.4
Green	Cyril Gambrell	247	11.6	−0.1
TUSC	Ruth Gaunt	54	2.5	N/A
Majority				
Turnout		2,146	34.5	
Registered electors		6,221		
Conservative hold		Swing		

=== Southgate ===
Southgate
Party	Candidate	Votes	%	±%
Labour Co-op	Dipesh Patel	924	46.2	−2.9
Conservative	Simon Piggott*	746	37.3	+1.5
Green	Robin Fitton	255	12.8	+3.4
TUSC	Brett Shattock	73	3.7	N/A
Majority				
Turnout		2,012	30.0	
Registered electors		6,711		
Labour Co-op gain from Conservative		Swing		

=== Three Bridges ===
Three Bridges
Party	Candidate	Votes	%	±%
Labour Co-op	Atif Nawaz*	1,274	51.4	+8.1
Conservative	Kevin Bonnick	809	32.6	−13.4
Green	Denielle Kail	215	8.7	+0.7
Independent	Muhammed Hanif	93	3.8	N/A
TUSC	Timothy Holt	89	3.6	N/A
Majority				
Turnout		2,496	36.9	
Registered electors		6,773		
Labour Co-op hold		Swing		

=== Tilgate ===
Tilgate
Party	Candidate	Votes	%	±%
Labour Co-op	Olu Adeniyi	732	48.7	+0.1
Conservative	Francis Guidera	550	36.6	−14.8
Green	Simon Thorn	120	8.0	N/A
Freedom Alliance	Amanda Brown	69	4.6	N/A
TUSC	Christopher Owen	33	2.2	N/A
Majority				
Turnout		1,514	33.7	
Registered electors		4,495		
Labour Co-op gain from Conservative		Swing		

== Changes 2024-2026 ==
=== By-elections ===
==== Northgate and West Green ====
Northgate and West Green by-election: 24 October 2024
Party	Candidate	Votes	%	±%
Labour	Khayla Abu Mosa	704	38.5	–15.0
Conservative	Jonathan Purdy	492	26.9	–2.0
Reform UK	Tim Charters	292	16.0	N/A
Green	Nick Park	174	9.5	–3.0
Workers Party	Linda Bamieh	133	7.3	N/A
TUSC	Robin Burnham	35	1.9	–3.2
Majority		212	11.6	–13.0
Turnout		1,842	23.6	–5.4
Registered electors		7,816		
Labour hold		Swing	▼6.5	
