= 2016 Crawley Borough Council election =

2016 UK local government election

- 5 May 2016

12 of the 37 seats to Crawley Borough Council 19 seats needed for a majority
| | First party | Second party |
|---|---|---|
| Party | Labour | Conservative |
| Seats before | 19 | 16 |
| Seats won | 9 | 4 |
| Seats after | 20 | 17 |
| Seat change | ▲1 | ▼1 |
| Popular vote | 9,487 | 8,856 |
| Percentage | 45.1% | 42.1% |
- Map showing the results of the 2016 Crawley Borough Council elections by ward. Blue show Conservative seats, and red shows Labour. Wards in grey had no election.
Council control before election
Labour
Council control after election
Labour

The 2016 Crawley Borough Council election took place on 5 May 2016 to elect members of Crawley Borough Council in West Sussex, England. This was on the same day as other local elections.

== Results ==
2016 Crawley Borough Council Election
| Party | Seats | Gains | Losses | Net gain/loss | Seats % | Votes % | Votes | +/− |
|---|---|---|---|---|---|---|---|---|
| Labour | 9 | 1 | 0 | ▲1 | 54 | 45 | 9,487 | |
| Conservative | 4 | 0 | 1 | ▼1 | 46 | 42 | 8,856 | |
| UKIP | 0 | 0 | 0 | 0 | 0 | 6 | 1,279 | |
| Liberal Democrats | 0 | 0 | 0 | 0 | 0 | 3 | 700 | |
| Green | 0 | 0 | 0 | 0 | 0 | 3 | 689 | |
| Justice Party | 0 | 0 | 0 | 0 | 0 | 0.1 | 22 | |

The Labour Party governing group of councillors increased their majority, gaining one seat from the Conservative opposition. None of the unrepresented parties achieved a first or second place in any of the seats for which the election took place.

== Ward by ward ==
=== Bewbush ===
Bewbush
| Party | Candidate | Votes | % |
|---|---|---|---|
| Labour | Marion Ayling | 761 | 52.8% |
| Conservative | Andrew Belben | 319 | 22.1% |
| UKIP | Christopher Brown | 223 | 15.5% |
| Liberal Democrats | Sarah Smith | 62 | 4.3% |
| Green | Martin Kail | 54 | 3.7% |
| Justice Party | Arshad Khan | 22 | 1.5% |
| Majority | | 442 | 30.7% |
| Turnout | | 1,441 | |
| Labour hold | | | |

=== Broadfield North ===
Broadfield North
| Party | Candidate | Votes | % |
|---|---|---|---|
| Labour | Brian Quinn | 825 | 76.7% |
| Conservative | Irshad Jalaldeen | 250 | 23.3% |
| Majority | | 575 | 53.4% |
| Turnout | | 1,075 | |
| Labour hold | | | |

=== Broadfield South ===
Broadfield South
| Party | Candidate | Votes | % |
|---|---|---|---|
| Labour | Tahira Rana | 610 | 50.8% |
| Conservative | Charles Petts | 424 | 35.3% |
| Green | Charlotte Franco | 166 | 13.8% |
| Majority | | 186 | 15.5% |
| Turnout | | 1,200 | |
| Labour hold | | | |

=== Gossops Green ===
Gossops Green
| Party | Candidate | Votes | % |
|---|---|---|---|
| Labour | Christopher Mullins | 767 | 50.0% |
| Conservative | Philip Norville | 580 | 37.8% |
| UKIP | Neil Setford-Thompson | 186 | 12.1% |
| Majority | | 187 | 12.2% |
| Turnout | | 1,533 | |
| Labour hold | | | |

=== Ifield ===
Ifield
| Party | Candidate | Votes | % |
|---|---|---|---|
| Labour | Peter Smith | 1,002 | 44.3% |
| Conservative | Andrew Jagger | 827 | 36.5% |
| UKIP | George Bird | 305 | 13.5% |
| Green | Richard Kail | 74 | 3.3% |
| Liberal Democrats | Mike Sargent | 56 | 2.5% |
| Majority | | 175 | 7.8% |
| Turnout | | 2,264 | |
| Labour hold | | | |

=== Langley Green ===
Langley Green
| Party | Candidate | Votes | % |
|---|---|---|---|
| Labour | Brenda Smith | 921 | 58.2% |
| Conservative | Kevin Hall | 341 | 21.6% |
| UKIP | Sharon Kennett | 189 | 11.9% |
| Liberal Democrats | Marko Scepanovic | 96 | 6.1% |
| Green | Rudolf Affolter | 35 | 2.2% |
| Majority | | 580 | 36.6% |
| Turnout | | 1,582 | |
| Labour hold | | | |

=== Maidenbower ===
Maidenbower
| Party | Candidate | Votes | % |
|---|---|---|---|
| Conservative | Duncan Peck | 1,199 | 70.9% |
| Labour | Akram Rana | 322 | 19.0% |
| Green | Danielle Kail | 171 | 10.1% |
| Majority | | 877 | 51.9% |
| Turnout | | 1,692 | |
| Conservative hold | | | |

=== Pound Hill North ===
Pound Hill North
| Party | Candidate | Votes | % |
|---|---|---|---|
| Conservative | Tina Belben | 947 | 64.4% |
| Labour | Tony Patel | 395 | 26.9% |
| Liberal Democrats | Valerie Spooner | 129 | 8.8% |
| Majority | | 552 | 37.5% |
| Turnout | | 1,471 | |
| Conservative hold | | | |

=== Pound Hill South and Worth ===
Pound Hill South and Worth
| Party | Candidate | Votes | % |
|---|---|---|---|
| Conservative | Robert Lanzer | 1,206 | 59.7% |
| Labour | Colin Flack | 675 | 33.4% |
| Green | Daniel Elliott | 139 | 6.9% |
| Majority | | 531 | 26.3% |
| Turnout | | 2,020 | |
| Conservative hold | | | |

=== Southgate ===
Southgate
| Party | Candidate | Votes | % |
|---|---|---|---|
| Labour | Michael Pickett | 1,179 | 53.7% |
| Conservative | Alison Berridge | 889 | 40.5% |
| Liberal Democrats | Kevin Osborne | 126 | 5.7% |
| Majority | | 290 | 13.2% |
| Turnout | | 2,194 | |
| Labour gain from Conservative | | | |

=== Three Bridges ===
Three Bridges
| Party | Candidate | Votes | % |
|---|---|---|---|
| Conservative | Brenda Burgess | 918 | 52.1% |
| Labour | Daryl Duncan-English | 742 | 42.1% |
| Liberal Democrats | Colin Young | 103 | 5.8% |
| Majority | | 176 | 10.0% |
| Turnout | | 1,763 | |
| Conservative hold | | | |

=== Tilgate ===
Tilgate
| Party | Candidate | Votes | % |
|---|---|---|---|
| Labour | Carlos Portal Castro | 749 | 43.3% |
| Conservative | Claire Griffiths | 645 | 37.3% |
| UKIP | Allan Griffiths | 244 | 14.1% |
| Green | Derek Hardman | 50 | 2.9% |
| Liberal Democrats | James Harper | 40 | 2.3% |
| Majority | | 104 | 6.0% |
| Turnout | | 1,728 | |
| Labour hold | | | |

=== West Green ===
West Green
| Party | Candidate | Votes | % |
|---|---|---|---|
| Labour | Rory Fiveash | 539 | 50.4% |
| Conservative | Ian Anguige | 311 | 29.1% |
| UKIP | Carole Lauderdale | 132 | 12.3% |
| Liberal Democrats | David Anderson | 88 | 8.2% |
| Majority | | 228 | 21.3% |
| Turnout | | 1,070 | |
| Labour hold | | | |
