= 2006 Crawley Borough Council election =

2006 UK local government election

← 2004	4 May 2006	2007 →

12 of the 37 seats to Crawley Borough Council 19 seats needed for a majority
	First party	Second party	Third party
Party	Conservative	Labour	Liberal Democrats
Seats before	16	19	2
Seats won	8	3	1
Seats after	19	16	2
Seat change	▲3	▼3	Steady
Popular vote	10,022	6,141	3,244
Percentage	46.7%	28.6%	15.1%
- Map showing the results of the 2006 Crawley Borough Council elections by ward. Red shows Labour seats, blue shows the Conservatives and yellow shows the Liberal Democrats. Wards in grey had no election.
Council control before election
Labour
Council control after election
Conservative

The 2006 Crawley Borough Council election took place on 4 May 2006 to elect members of Crawley Borough Council in West Sussex, England. One third of the council was up for election. The Conservatives gained overall control of the council from the Labour Party, albeit with a majority of just one seat.

After the election, the composition of the council was:

- Conservative 19
- Labour 16
- Liberal Democrats 2

== Ward results ==
=== Bewbush ===
Bewbush
Party	Candidate	Votes	%
Labour	Christopher Redmayne	634	43.2%
Conservative	Kevan McCarthy	442	30.1%
Liberal Democrats	Michael Scott	211	14.4%
Independent	Robin Burnham	126	8.6%
Justice Party	Arshad Khan	56	3.8%
Majority		192	13.1%
Turnout		1,469	
Labour hold			

=== Broadfield North ===
Broadfield North
Party	Candidate	Votes	%
Conservative	Adam Brown	500	42.2%
Labour	Thakordas Patel	500	42.2%
Liberal Democrats	Christopher Richardson	186	15.7%
Majority		0	0.0%
Turnout		1,186	
Conservative gain from Labour			

- The Conservative candidate won on a drawing of lots.

=== Broadfield South ===
Broadfield South
Party	Candidate	Votes	%
Conservative	Alan Quirk	549	47.0%
Labour	Jayne Skudder	437	37.4%
Liberal Democrats	James Cotter	98	8.4%
Green	Darrin Green	84	7.2%
Majority		112	9.6%
Turnout		1,168	
Conservative hold			

=== Furnace Green ===
Furnace Green
Party	Candidate	Votes	%
Conservative	Michael Weatherley	1,004	46.5%
Labour	Eugene Sully	457	21.2%
Liberal Democrats	Roger McMurray	332	15.4%
BNP	Vernon Atkinson	298	13.8%
Independent	Oliver Coxhead	69	3.2%
Majority		547	25.3%
Turnout		2,160	
Conservative hold			

=== Ifield ===
Ifield
Party	Candidate	Votes	%
Conservative	John Denman	883	34.9%
Labour	John Stanley	862	34.1%
BNP	George Baldwin	447	17.7%
Liberal Democrats	Barry Hamilton	242	9.6%
Independent	Richard Symonds	94	3.7%
Majority		21	0.8%
Turnout		2,528	
Conservative gain from Labour			

=== Langley Green ===
Langley Green
Party	Candidate	Votes	%
Labour	James Smith	888	52.8%
Conservative	Charles Skinner	482	28.7%
Liberal Democrats	Kevin Osborne	312	18.5%
Majority		406	24.1%
Turnout		1,682	
Labour hold			

=== Maidenbower ===
Maidenbower
Party	Candidate	Votes	%
Conservative	Lucy Brockwell	1,418	74.7%
Liberal Democrats	Robert Huston	286	15.1%
Labour	Ansar Khan	194	10.2%
Majority		1,132	59.6%
Turnout		1,898	
Conservative hold			

=== Northgate ===
Northgate
Party	Candidate	Votes	%
Liberal Democrats	Linda Seekings	625	46.0%
Labour	William Ward	349	25.7%
Conservative	Robert Burgess	335	24.7%
Socialist Labour	Christine Townsend	49	3.6%
Majority		276	20.3%
Turnout		1,358	
Liberal Democrats hold			

=== Pound Hill North ===
Pound Hill North
Party	Candidate	Votes	%
Conservative	Richard Burrett	1,560	76.4%
Labour	Andrew Skudder	280	13.7%
Liberal Democrats	Victoria Seekings	201	9.8%
Majority		1,280	62.7%
Turnout		2,041	
Conservative hold			

=== Pound Hill South and Worth ===
Pound Hill South and Worth
Party	Candidate	Votes	%
Conservative	Lee Burke	1,549	70.1%
Liberal Democrats	Edward Reay	339	15.3%
Labour	Rajesh Sharma	321	14.5%
Majority		1,210	54.8%
Turnout		2,209	
Conservative hold			

=== Southgate ===
Southgate
Party	Candidate	Votes	%
Conservative	Howard Bloom	936	38.7%
Labour	Robbie Sharma	738	30.5%
Liberal Democrats	Jonathan Bonner	271	11.2%
BNP	Richard Trower	263	10.9%
Green	Malcolm Liles	212	8.8%
Majority		198	8.2%
Turnout		2,420	
Conservative gain from Labour			

=== West Green ===
West Green
Party	Candidate	Votes	%
Labour	Robert Hull	481	36.0%
Conservative	Jarnail Singh	364	27.3%
BNP	Kevin Watt	210	15.7%
Liberal Democrats	Andrew Beckett	141	10.6%
Independent	Rebecca O'Gorman	139	10.4%
Majority		117	8.7%
Turnout		1,335	
Labour hold			
