= 2000 Crawley Borough Council election =

2000 UK local government election

The 2000 Crawley Borough Council election took place on 4 May 2000 to elect members of Crawley Borough Council in West Sussex, England. One third of the council was up for election and the Labour Party stayed in overall control of the council.

After the election, the composition of the council was:

- Labour 24
- Conservative 6
- Liberal Democrats 2

== Background ==
Before the election Labour held control of the council with 24 seats, compared to 5 for the Conservatives and 2 for the Liberal Democrats. One seat was vacant after Labour councillor Jack Newsome resigned from the council on moving from the area.

== Election result ==
Labour remained in control of the council after winning 10 of the 12 seats contested, but did lose 1 seat to the Conservatives. The Conservative gain came in the vacant Pound Hill South seat, with the party winning by 225 votes to take the Conservatives to 6 seats on the council.

Crawley local election result 2000
Party	Seats	Gains	Losses	Net gain/loss	Seats %	Votes %	Votes	+/−
Labour	10			-1	83.3			
Conservative	2			+1	16.7			

== By-elections between 2000 and 2002 ==
A by-election was held in West Green on 14 September 2000 after the death of the Labour leader of Crawley Council, Tony Edwards. The by-election was dominated by plans to remove services from Crawley Hospital and Labour candidate Robert Hull held the seat with a reduced 151 vote majority, with a campaigner against the plans for the hospital coming second with 344 votes.

West Green By-Election 14 September 2000
Party	Candidate	Votes	%	±%
Labour	Robert Hull	495	43.4	−23.6
Crawley Hospital Campaign	Gary Commins	344	30.2	+30.2
Conservative	Jacqueline Kingsford	165	14.5	0.0
UKIP	Niall Mitchell	56	4.9	+4.9
Independent	Barbara O'Brien	41	3.6	+3.6
Liberal Democrats	Kevin Osbourne	38	3.3	−5.1
Majority		151	13.2	
Turnout		1,139	33.9	
Labour hold		Swing		
