= 2019 Crawley Borough Council election =

2019 UK local government election

← 2018	2 May 2019	2021 →

All 36 seats to Crawley Borough Council 19 seats needed for a majority
	First party	Second party
Party	Labour	Conservative
Seats before	19	17
Seats won	19	17
Seat change	▼1	Steady
- Map showing the results of the 2019 Crawley Borough Council elections by ward. Red shows Labour seats, and blue shows Conservative seats. Wards in grey had no election.
Council control before election
Labour
Council control after election
Labour

The 2019 Crawley Borough Council election took place on 2 May 2019 to elect members of Crawley Borough Council in West Sussex, England. This was on the same day as other local elections. The entire council was up for election after ward boundaries changed and the Labour Party retained control of the council.

== Ward results ==
=== Bewbush & North Broadfield (3) ===
Bewbush & North Broadfield (3 seats)
Party	Candidate	Votes	%
Labour	Marion Ayling	1,029	58.9
Labour	Rory Fiveash	948	54.3
Labour	Michael Gerard Jones	873	50.0
Conservative	Tony Herbert	419	24.0
Conservative	Nina Wakeling	384	22.0
Conservative	Angela Khassal	325	18.6
Green	Richard Kail	321	18.4
Liberal Democrats	Sarah Smith	172	9.8
Legacy Party	Janet Elizabeth Setford-Thompson	108	6.2
Justice Party	Arshad Khan	106	6.1
Turnout			24%

=== Broadfield (3) ===
Broadfield (3 seats)
Party	Candidate	Votes	%
Labour	Ian Irvine	1,027	59.2
Labour	Tim Lunnon	868	50.0
Labour	Tahira Rana	807	46.5
Conservative	Stefan Franks	673	38.8
Conservative	Valerie Knight	596	34.4
Conservative	Irshad Jalaldeen	540	31.1
Turnout			24%

=== Furnace Green (2) ===
Furnace Green (2 seats)
Party	Candidate	Votes	%
Conservative	Duncan Crow	1,119	54.4
Conservative	Carol Eade	1,050	51.0
Labour	Dan Dobson	861	41.9
Labour	Laura-Lee Willcock	693	33.7
Liberal Democrats	Harry Old	171	8.3
Turnout			46%

=== Gossops Green & North East Broadfield (2) ===
Gossops Green & North East Broadfield (2 seats)
Party	Candidate	Votes	%
Labour	Christopher Mullins	666	42.7
Conservative	Liam Ascough	656	42.1
Labour	Susan Mullins	605	38.8
Conservative	Lisa Vitler	598	38.4
Green	Iain Bradley Martin Dickson	218	14.0
Legacy Party	Neil James Setford-Thompson	61	3.9
Turnout			33%

=== Ifield (3) ===
Ifield (3 seats)
Party	Candidate	Votes	%
Labour	Geraint Thomas	1,167	51.7
Labour	Peter Charles Smith	1,132	50.1
Labour	Jilly Hart	1,076	47.7
Conservative	Josh Bounds	945	41.9
Conservative	Martin Stone	932	41.3
Conservative	Tahir Ashraf	864	38.3
Turnout			32%

=== Langley Green & Tushmore (3) ===
S

Langley Green & Tushmore (3 seats)
Party	Candidate	Votes	%
Labour	Shahzad Malik	965	57.7
Labour	Brenda Ann Smith	958	57.3
Labour	Tom McAleney	816	48.8
Conservative	Bradley Constable	365	21.8
Conservative	Tanya Taylor	320	19.1
Conservative	William Arinze	313	18.7
Liberal Democrats	Mike Sargent	267	16.0
Liberal Democrats	Lawrence Mallinson	191	11.4
Turnout			28%

=== Maidenbower (3) ===
Maidenbower (3 seats)
Party	Candidate	Votes	%
Conservative	Kim Jaggard	1,216	66.1
Conservative	Jennifer Millar-Smith	1,188	64.6
Conservative	Duncan Peck	1,051	57.2
Labour	Cecilia Hughes	580	31.5
Labour	Neil Christopher Hughes	543	29.5
Labour	Daniel Emuebie Ugbo	494	26.9
Turnout			29%

=== Northgate & West Green (3) ===
Northgate & West Green (3 seats)
Party	Candidate	Votes	%
Labour	Peter Keir Lamb	1,126	48.5
Labour	Gurinder Singh Jhans	1,016	43.8
Labour	Karen Sudan	996	42.9
Conservative	Zack Ali	827	35.6
Conservative	Connor Bounds	734	31.6
Conservative	Maureen Mwagale	662	28.5
Green	Sally Claire Fadelle	419	18.1
Liberal Democrats	David Anderson	366	15.8
Turnout			32%

=== Pound Hill North & Forge Wood (3) ===
Pound Hill North & Forge Wood (3 seats)
Party	Candidate	Votes	%
Conservative	Richard David Burrett	1,065	60.0
Conservative	Tina Belben	1,038	58.5
Conservative	Kevan McCarthy	976	55.0
Labour	Olusina Adeniyi	477	26.9
Labour	Siobhan Gallichan	473	26.6
Labour	Winifred Norma Catherine Duggan	450	25.4
Legacy Party	John Mac Canna	161	9.1
Turnout			31%

=== Pound Hill South & Worth (3) ===
Pound Hill South & Worth (3 seats)
Party	Candidate	Votes	%
Conservative	Andrew Belben	1,167	54.8
Conservative	Bob Lanzer	1,165	54.7
Conservative	Alison Pendlington	1,051	49.4
Labour	Colin Flack	710	33.4
Labour	Emma Newnham	633	29.7
Labour	Stuart Aruna Gunatillake	506	23.8
Green	Cyril James Gambrell	483	22.7
Turnout			34%

=== Southgate (3) ===
Southgate (3 seats)
Party	Candidate	Votes	%
Labour	Mike Pickett	1,065	48.4
Labour	Morgan Flack	1,017	46.2
Labour	Raj Sharma	999	45.4
Conservative	Simon Piggott	856	38.9
Conservative	Inna Orjola	775	35.2
Conservative	Karim Khassal	722	32.8
Liberal Democrats	Kevin Osborne	301	13.7
Turnout			34%

=== Three Bridges (3) ===
Three Bridges (3 seats)
Party	Candidate	Votes	%
Conservative	Brenda Burgess	976	49.2
Conservative	Bob Burgess	969	48.8
Conservative	Jonathan Purdy	798	40.2
Labour	Julian Charatan	752	37.9
Labour	Angela Malik	743	37.4
Labour	Stephen Pritchard	710	35.8
Green	Danielle Kail	425	21.4
Turnout			33%

=== Tilgate (2) ===
Tilgate (2 seats)
Party	Candidate	Votes	%
Conservative	Francis Guidera	803	48.4
Conservative	Charles Petts	651	39.3
Labour	Kiran Khan	646	39.0
Labour	Carlos Portal Castro	631	38.1
Green	Derek Hardman	259	15.6
Turnout			37%
