= 2010 Crawley Borough Council election =

2010 UK local government election

- 6 May 2010

12 of the 37 seats to Crawley Borough Council 21 seats needed for a majority
	First party	Second party	Third party
Party	Conservative	Labour	Liberal Democrats
Last election	26	9	2
Seats before	26	10^{†}	1^{†}
Seats won	8	4	0
Seats after	26	11	0
Seat change	Steady	▲1	▼1
Popular vote	19,516	14,543	2,705
Percentage	50.1%	37.4%	6.9%
- Map showing the results of the 2010 Crawley Borough Council elections by ward. Blue show Conservative seats, and red shows Labour. Wards in grey had no election.^{†} Labour gained a seat from the Liberal Democrats in a by-election in 2009
Council control before election
Conservative
Council control after election
Conservative

The 2010 Crawley Borough Council election took place on 6 May 2010 to elect members of Crawley Borough Council in West Sussex, England. One third of the council was up for election and the Conservative Party stayed in overall control of the council.

After the election, the composition of the council was:

- Conservative 26
- Labour 11

== Election result ==
Crawley local election result 2010
Party	Seats	Gains	Losses	Net gain/loss	Seats %	Votes %	Votes	+/−
Conservative	8	1	1	0	66.6	50.1	19,516	+1.7
Labour	4	2	1	+1	33.3	37.4	14,543	+8.5
Liberal Democrats	0	0	1	-1	0.0	6.9	2,705	-7.2
BNP	0	0	0	0	0.0	4.5	1,766	+0.1
Independent	0	0	0	0	0.0	0.7	271	+0.2
UKIP	0	0	0	0	0.0	0.3	124	+0.3

== Ward results ==
=== Bewbush ===
Bewbush
Party	Candidate	Votes	%
Labour	Michael Jones	1,660	49.8%
Conservative	Ray Ward	1,280	38.4%
BNP	Linda Atkinson	393	11.8%
Majority		380	11.4%
Turnout		3,333	
Labour hold			

=== Broadfield North ===
Broadfield North
Party	Candidate	Votes	%
Labour	Ian Irvine	1,267	53.0%
Conservative	Adam Brown	1,124	47.0%
Majority		143	6.0%
Turnout		2,391	
Labour gain from Conservative			

=== Broadfield South ===
Broadfield South
Party	Candidate	Votes	%
Conservative	Alan Quirk	1,277	55.5%
Labour	Colin Moffatt	1,023	44.5%
Majority		254	11.0%
Turnout		2,300	
Conservative hold			

=== Furnace Green ===
Furnace Green
Party	Candidate	Votes	%
Conservative	Carol Eade	1,408	46.0%
Labour	Jean Calcott	873	28.5%
Liberal Democrats	Darren Wise	554	18.1%
BNP	Vernon Atkinson	228	7.4%
Majority		535	17.5%
Turnout		3,063	
Conservative hold			

=== Ifield ===
Ifield
Party	Candidate	Votes	%
Conservative	John Denman	1,877	45.8%
Labour	John Mortimer	1,616	39.4%
BNP	Francis Carlin	333	8.1%
Independent	Richard Symonds	271	6.6%
Majority		261	6.4%
Turnout		4,097	
Conservative hold			

=== Langley Green ===
Langley Green
Party	Candidate	Votes	%
Labour	Stephen Joyce	1,577	45.6%
Conservative	Ijaz Khan	1,225	35.4%
Liberal Democrats	Kevin Osborne	654	18.9%
Majority		352	10.2%
Turnout		3,456	
Labour hold			

=== Maidenbower ===
Maidenbower
Party	Candidate	Votes	%
Conservative	Ken Trussell	2,989	69.9%
Labour	Peter Smith	1,289	30.1%
Majority		1,700	39.8%
Turnout		4,278	
Conservative hold			

=== Northgate ===
Northgate
Party	Candidate	Votes	%
Labour	Peter Keir Lamb	1,104	49.9%
Conservative	Mirza Ali	854	38.6%
BNP	Dennis Kenealy	253	11.4%
Majority		250	11.3%
Turnout		2,211	
Labour gain from Liberal Democrats			

=== Pound Hill North ===
Pound Hill North
Party	Candidate	Votes	%
Conservative	Richard Burrett	2,111	59.5%
Liberal Democrats	Eddie Reay	702	19.8%
Labour	Jogi Singh	611	17.2%
UKIP	Dinesh Tagarsi	124	3.5%
Majority		1,409	39.7%
Turnout		3,548	
Conservative hold			

=== Pound Hill South and Worth ===
Pound Hill South and Worth
Party	Candidate	Votes	%
Conservative	Lee Burke	2,586	59.2%
Labour	Philomena Woodhams	984	22.5%
Liberal Democrats	Sulu Pandya	795	18.2%
Majority		1,602	36.7%
Turnout		4,365	
Conservative hold			

=== Southgate ===
Southgate
Party	Candidate	Votes	%
Conservative	Howard Bloom	1,839	48.9%
Labour	Jim McGough	1,603	42.6%
BNP	Ryan Grice	322	8.6%
Majority		236	6.3%
Turnout		3,764	
Conservative hold			

=== West Green ===
West Green
Party	Candidate	Votes	%
Conservative	Vanessa Cumper	946	44.6%
Labour	TP Patel	936	44.2%
BNP	Stuart Minihane	237	11.2%
Majority		10	0.4%
Turnout		2,119	
Conservative gain from Labour			
