= Crawley Borough Council =

Local authority for the borough of Crawley in West Sussex, England

Type
- Type: Non-metropolitan district

Leadership
- Mayor: Marion Ayling, Labour since 22 May 2026
- Leader: Michael Jones, Labour since 27 May 2022
- Chief Executive: Ian Duke since 25 September 2023

Structure
- Political groups: Administration (21) Labour (21) Opposition (15) Reform UK (11) Conservative (4)
- Length of term: 4 years

Elections
- Last election: 2 May 2024
- Next election: 7 May 2026

Meeting place
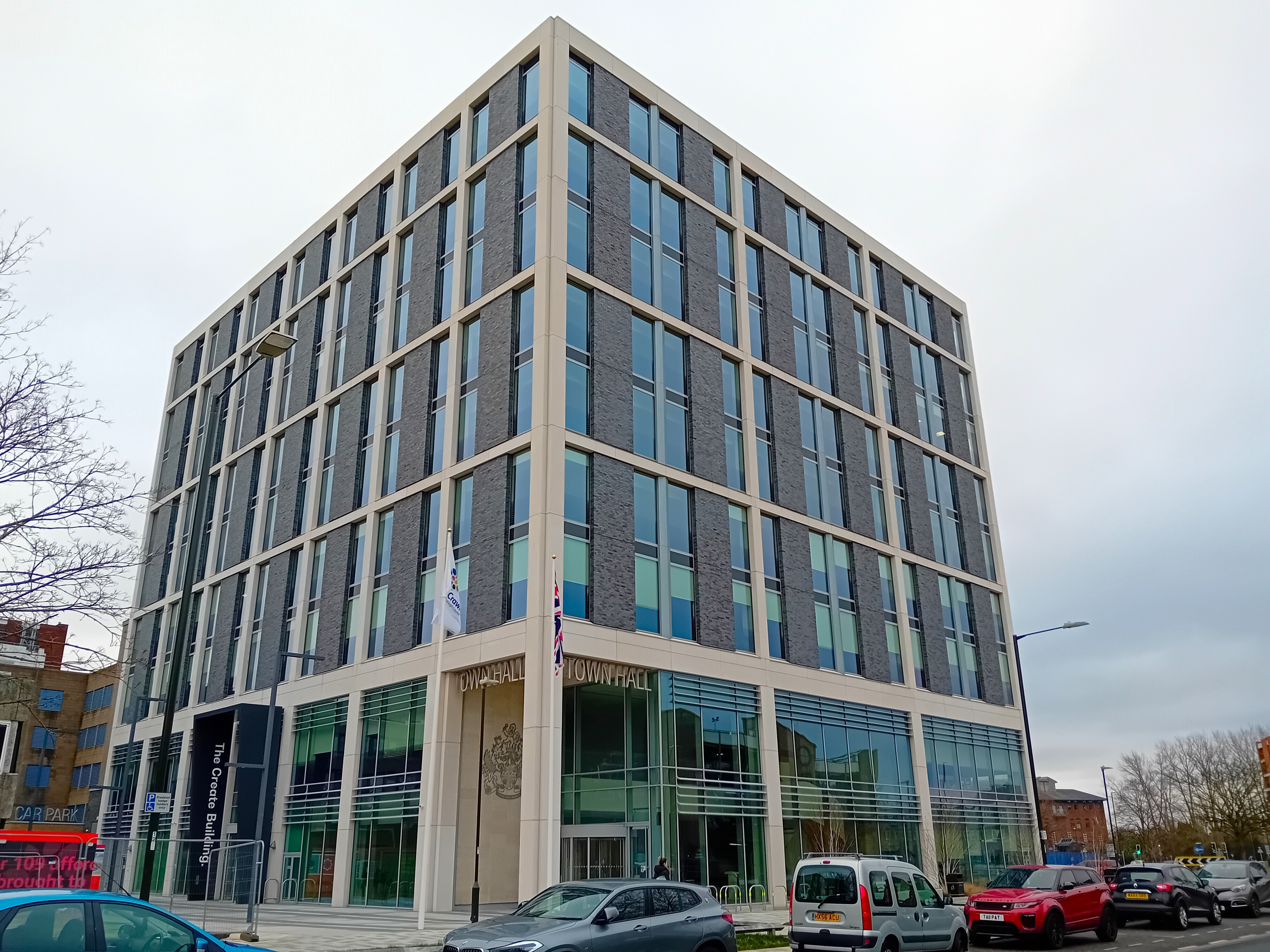
- Town Hall, The Boulevard, Crawley, RH10 0ZZ

Website
- crawley.gov.uk

Crawley Borough Council is the local authority for Crawley in West Sussex, England. It consists of 36 councillors and is currently controlled by the Labour Party, led by Michael Jones. The administrative headquarters are at Crawley Town Hall.

== History ==
Prior to 1956 Crawley had been governed as a rural parish within the Horsham Rural District. The parish was significantly enlarged in 1933 when the neighbouring parish of Ifield was abolished. Following the designation of Crawley as a new town in 1947, the parish was further enlarged in 1953 to take in the Three Bridges area from the neighbouring parish of Worth.

The parish of Crawley was made an urban district in 1956.

The urban district was reconstituted as a non-metropolitan district on 1 April 1974 under the Local Government Act 1972, gaining the parts of the parishes of Slaugham and Worth within the designated area for the new town, plus Gatwick Airport and adjoining areas from the Surrey parishes of Charlwood and Horley. The reformed district was awarded borough status at the same time, allowing the chair of the council to take the title of mayor.

== Governance ==
Crawley Borough Council provides district-level services. County-level services are provided by West Sussex County Council. There are no civil parishes in the borough, which is an unparished area.

=== Political control ===
The council has been under Labour majority control since 2022.

Political control of the council since the 1974 reforms has been as follows:

Party in control	Years
Labour	1974–2006
Conservative	2006–2006
No overall control	2006–2007
Conservative	2007–2014
Labour	2014–2020
No overall control	2020–2022
Labour	2022–present

=== Leadership ===
The role of mayor is largely ceremonial in Crawley. Political leadership is instead provided by the leader of the council. The leaders since 1974 have been:

Councillor	Party	From	To
George Waller	Labour	1974	1978
Ben Clay	Labour	1978	1980
Alf Pegler	Labour	1980	1982
Tony Edwards	Labour	1982	1983
Ben Clay	Labour	1983	1986
Alf Pegler	Labour	1986	2 Sep 1996
Tony Edwards	Labour	Sep 1996	22 Jun 2000
Chris Redmayne	Labour	26 Jul 2000	May 2006
Bob Lanzer	Conservative	26 May 2006	Aug 2013
Howard Bloom	Conservative	26 Sep 2013	May 2014
Peter Lamb	Labour	13 Jun 2014	May 2022
Michael Jones	Labour	27 May 2022	

=== Composition ===
Following the 2026 election, the composition of the council was:

Party	Councillors
Labour	21
Reform	11
Conservative	4
Total	36

The next election is due in May 2030.

== Elections ==
Since the last boundary changes in 2019 the council has comprised 36 councillors representing 13 wards. Each ward elects two or three councillors. Elections are held three years out of every four, with a third of the council being elected each time for a four-year term of office. West Sussex County Council elections are held in the fourth year of the cycle when there are no borough council elections.

== Premises ==
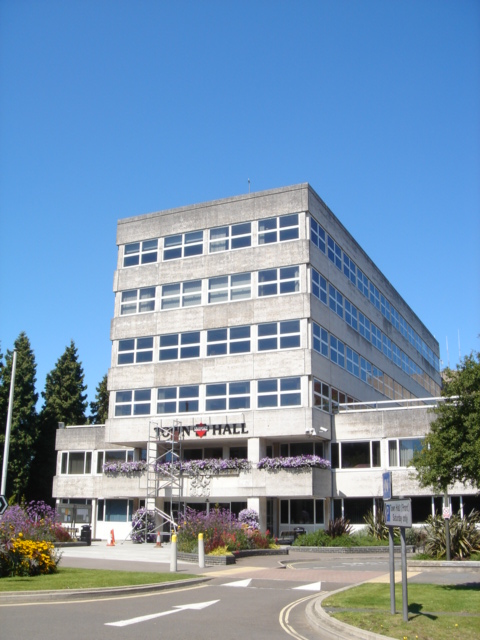
Old Town Hall: Council's headquarters 1964–2022

The council is based at Crawley Town Hall on the Boulevard, purpose-built for it on the site of the old Civic Hall (in the Town Hall complex built in 1964 for the urban district council) and formally opened on 21 March 2023.
