= Locally listed buildings in Crawley =

Listed buildings in Crawley, England

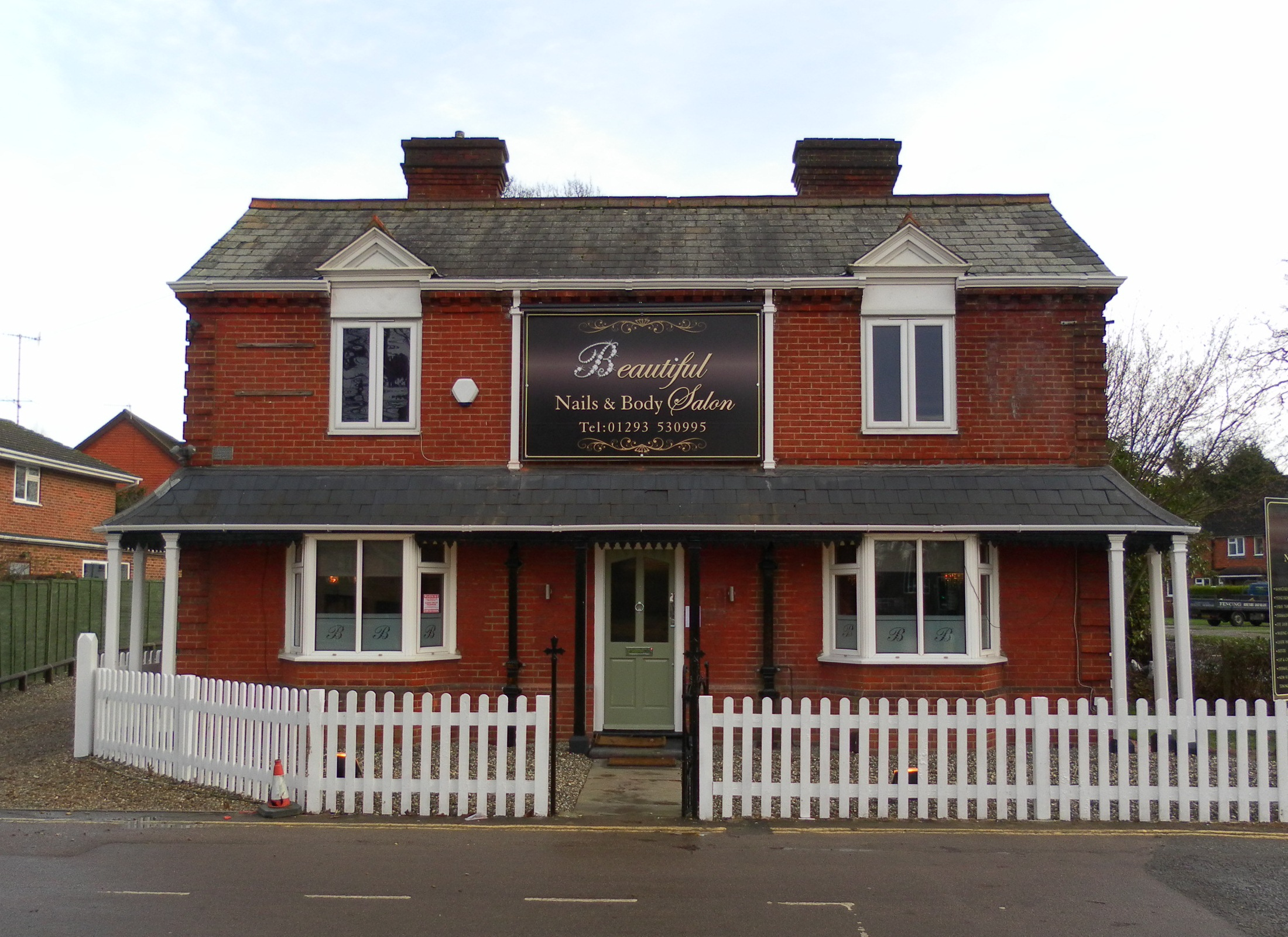
This late-19th-century building in the Pound Hill area of Crawley was originally the lodge of Worth Park, a nearby mansion.

As of November 2010, there were 59 locally listed buildings in Crawley, a town and borough in the county of West Sussex in southeast England. One of these has subsequently been demolished. A locally listed building is defined as "a building, structure or feature that, whilst not statutorily listed by the Secretary of State, the Council considers to be an important part of Crawley's heritage due to its architectural, historic or archaeological significance". Crawley Borough Council administers the selection and deselection process, defines the criteria for inclusion, and produces and updates the local list.

Crawley is a postwar New Town with a population was 106,597 at the time of the United Kingdom Census 2011, but many older buildings remain. The area covered by the present borough consisted of the small market town of Crawley itself, several villages such as Ifield and Worth, country estates with large houses, extensive grounds and lodges, and some Victorian and Edwardian suburban development. Buildings of various types from these eras are represented on the local list, as are New Town-era features—from churches to shopping parades.

Some buildings lie within conservation areas, of which Crawley has eleven. Others have been suggested as candidates for statutory listing, which would recognise them as buildings of national importance. Previous versions of the local list have included buildings which have been removed because they were upgraded to nationally listed status, others whose quality had been degraded so that they no longer met the council's criteria, and others lost to demolition and redevelopment.

== Criteria ==
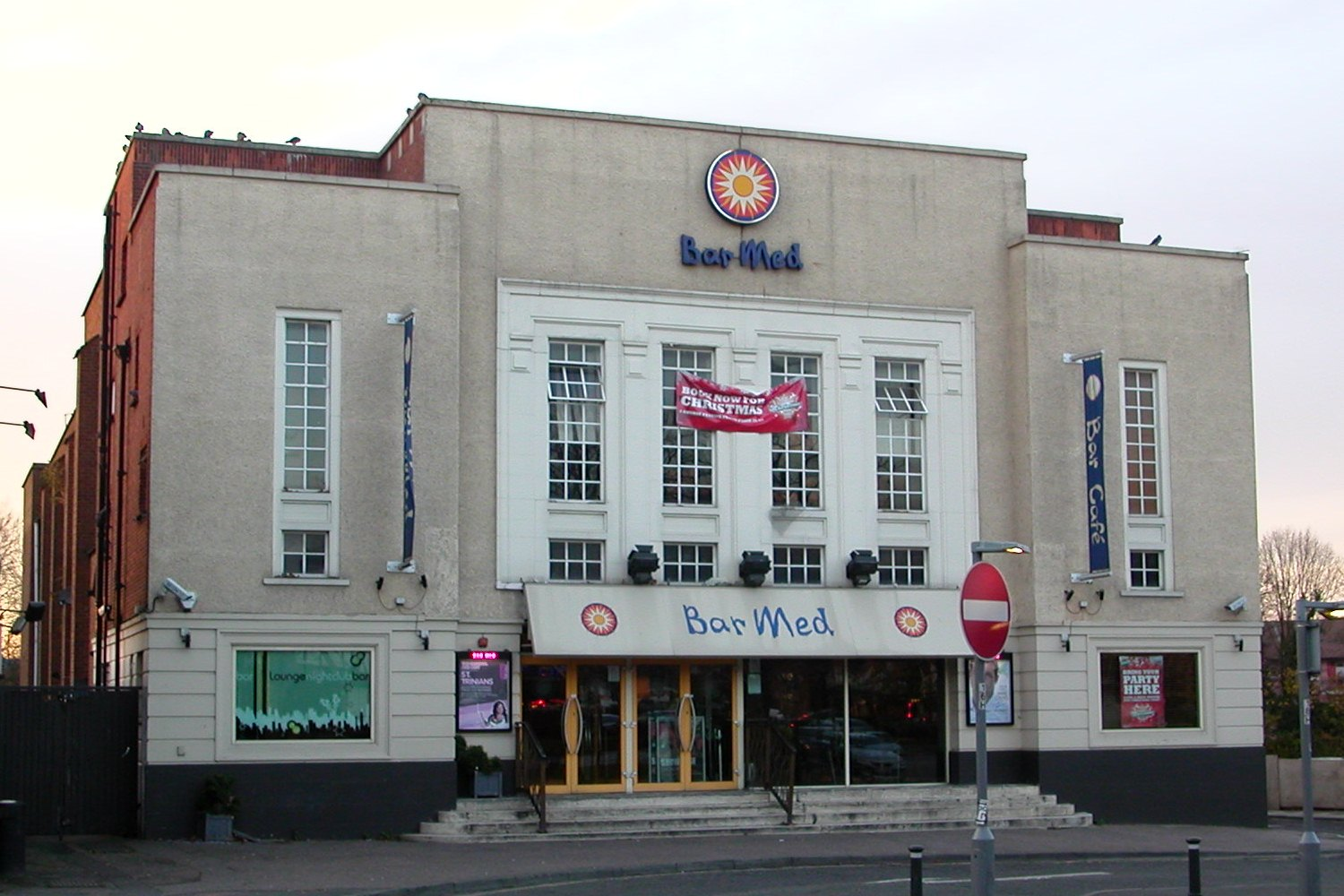
The former Embassy cinema (pictured in 2008) was added to the local list in 2010 but has since been demolished.

Crawley Borough Council uses five criteria in choosing which buildings and structures should be designated. Historic interest refers to how well the building exemplifies the era in which it was built, particularly if it represents "an important phase in Crawley’s history". Architectural interest is judged on factors such as the notability (locally or more generally) of people and companies involved in the design and construction, and the style of the building—especially if it uses locally produced materials or is "a good example of the local vernacular". Group or townscape value applies to buildings with significance in the street scene or aesthetically pleasing settings, and to those considered local landmarks (such as St Alban's Church at Gossops Green, which stands in the centre of the neighbourhood overlooking green space and which has a prominent campanile). Intactness has two elements as a criterion. Locally listed buildings should retain "a high proportion of [their] historic features", ideally with little or no alterations. However, buildings which would usually be of high enough quality to be included on the national list had they not been altered can be also added to the local list. Communal value ("the extent to which a building or structure is valued by the local community") applies to buildings such as public and civic buildings, places of worship and structures with symbolic significance. All buildings on the list as of November 2010 were described by the council as "strongly fulfil[ling]" the historic interest criterion; and all except 31–33 High Street also meet the architectural interest criterion. The other three criteria are met to varying degrees, either "strongly" or "slightly".

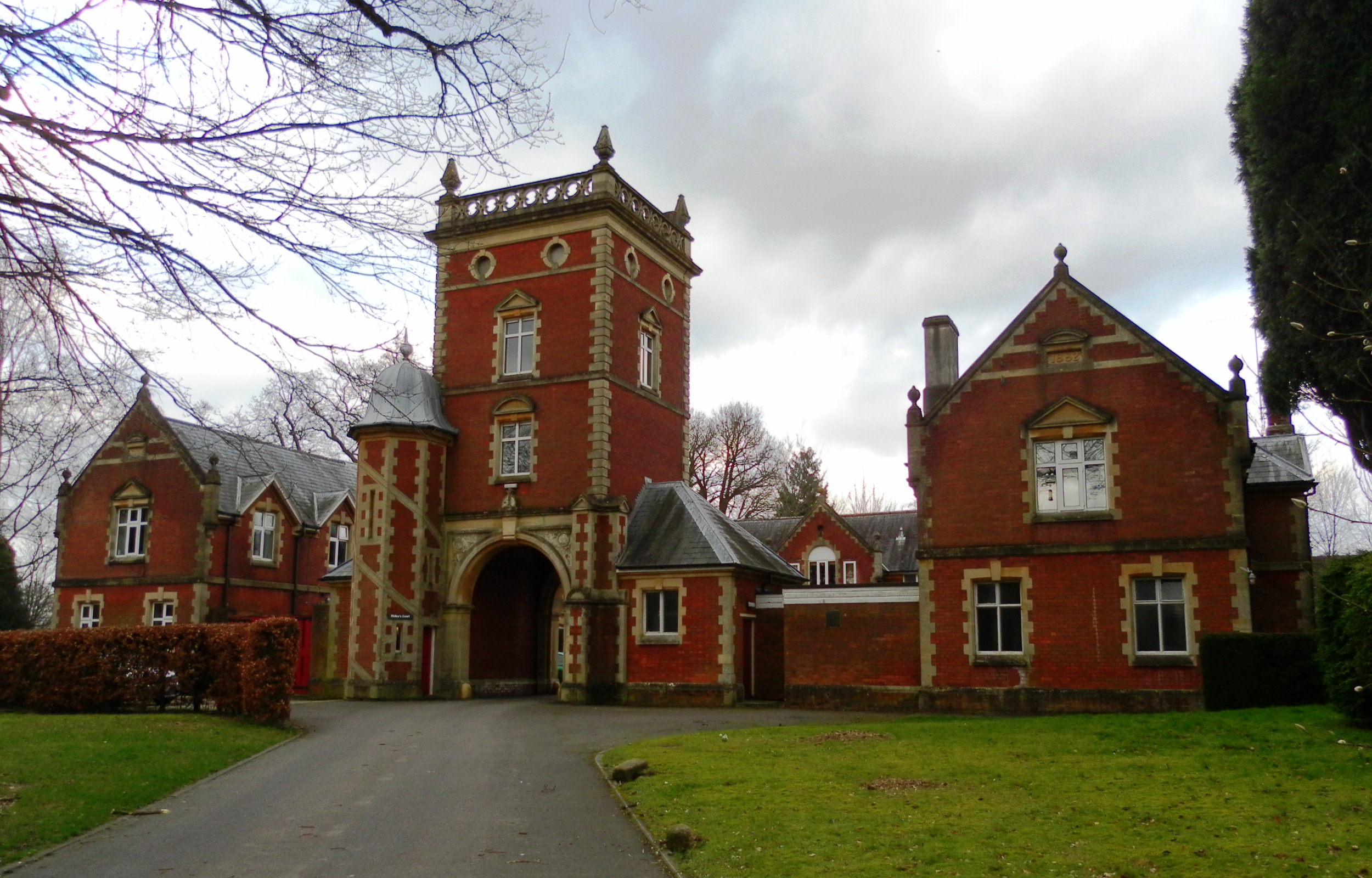
Before they were added to the national list in 2008, the former stables at Milton Mount Gardens (now Ridley's Court) were on the local list.

A study was undertaken in April 2010 to update Crawley's local list; the November 2010 update was issued as a result of this. Of the 59 buildings on the list, 13 were added at that time: 49 Brighton Road, Crawley United Reformed Church, Deerswood Court, the former Embassy cinema (latterly Bar Med), 11 Horsham Road, Oak House, the Old Post Office and Malvern Cottage, Poplars, 1 Pullcotts Farm Cottages, St Alban's Church, St Edward the Confessor's Church, St Mary's Church and The Oaks Primary School. A recommendation was also made to add Toovies Farmhouse on Balcombe Road in Tinsley Green to the local list, but it already appears on the national statutory list as a Grade II listed building. At the same time, 11 buildings were removed from the local list. The Beehive at Gatwick Airport and the former stable block at Milton Mount Gardens had been upgraded to nationally listed buildings, and 52 High Street had been incorporated into the national listing for the George Hotel. A gun tower at Forge Farm and the former Baptist chapel at Robinson Road had been demolished. Elsewhere, Westview Cottages and Holly Cottage in Fernhill were removed because their "historic character [had] been eroded" by alterations such as exterior painting and replacement of original windows; the four-building terrace at 53–59 High Street was removed because of significant alteration, especially at ground-floor level; 45 High Street was removed because windows and its shopfront had been replaced, affecting its architectural importance; 13–15 New Street in Three Bridges were removed because a series of alterations and modernisations had "damaged the historic character of these buildings"; and Toovies Farm Cottage and Norfolk Cottage were removed because extensions and replacement windows reduced their historical significance. Since the list was released in November 2010, the former Embassy cinema in the town centre (opened on 1 August 1938) was demolished following the submission of a planning application for redevelopment of the site in August 2011. In its final incarnation as the Bar Med nightclub, it closed on 28 August 2012.

Crawley borough has eight conservation areas—"areas of special architectural or historic interest, the character or appearance of which it is desirable to preserve or enhance". The Dyers Almshouses are part of the conservation area of the same name; Ifield Barn Theatre is in the Ifield conservation area; and Nightingale House is within the Brighton Road conservation area. The St Peter's conservation area includes the Swan Inn and St Peter's Church. The High Street conservation area has several locally listed buildings: Grand Parade, 1–4 Ifield Road and the buildings at numbers 31–33, 37, 41–43 and 47 High Street.

== History and context ==
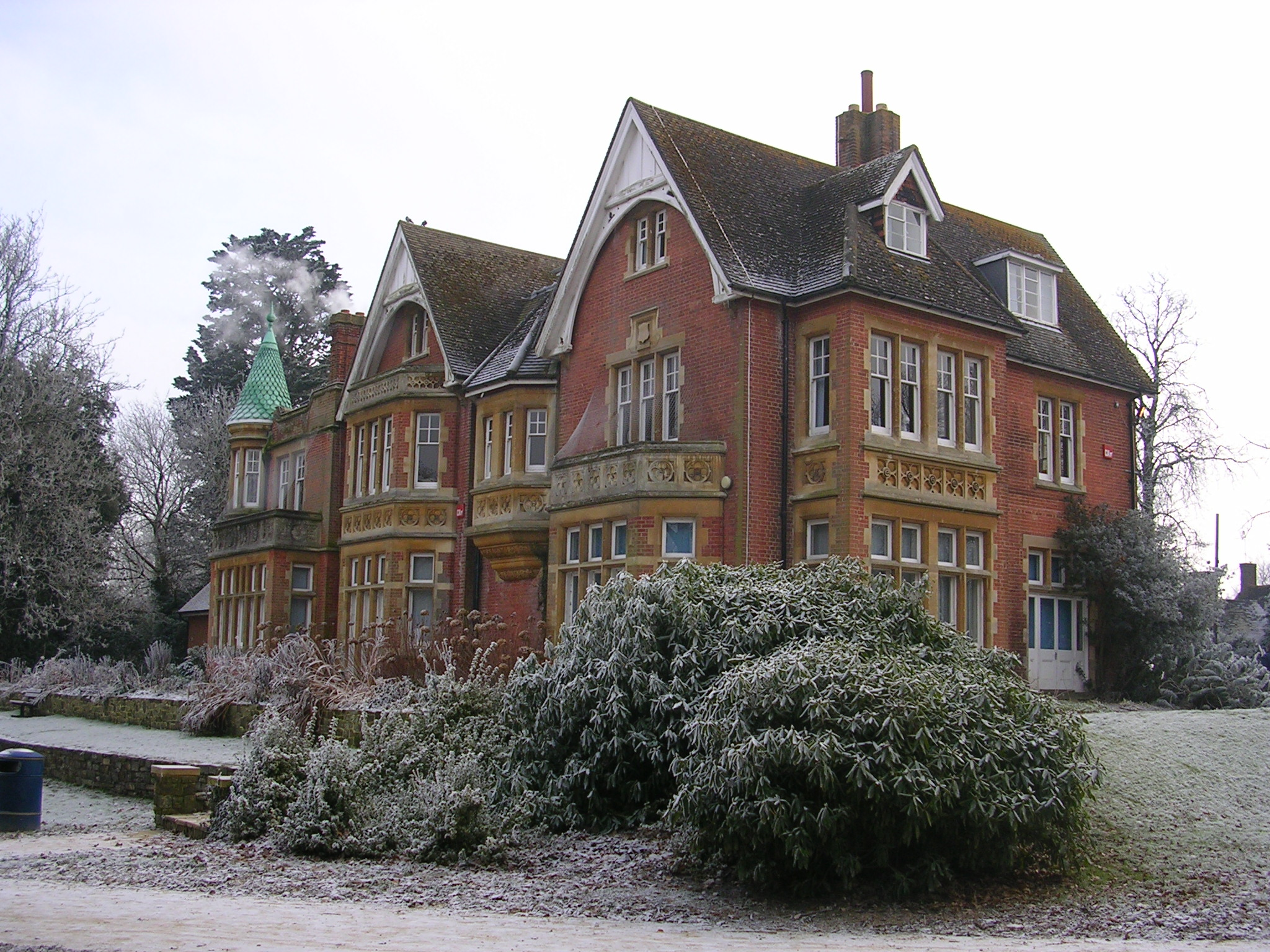
Some of Crawley's 19th-century mansions, such as Goffs Park House, survive and are on the local list.

Crawley has ancient origins, as do the surrounding villages which became part of the present urban area. Growth was slow for centuries, though, and the character of a small market town was maintained. Rural but within easy reach of London, and with a reputation for healthy air and a wide variety of leisure pursuits, the area became popular in the 19th century among wealthy people wishing to establish country residences. Many large houses were built, often in extensive grounds and with ancillary buildings as part of the estate. Most have been demolished or converted to alternative uses. Surviving examples include the Gothic Revival Gatwick House (1876) at Fernhill, now offices; the mid-19th-century Burstow Hall nearby, which is still residential; and Goffs Park House (1882), whose vast grounds have become a public park. Tilgate House and Worth Park (later Milton Mount College) were demolished in the 1950s and 1960s respectively, but their lodges survive (both in commercial use), as do others on the Turners Hill Road and at Povey Cross (still residential).

The 19th century was also characterised by haphazard and small-scale residential development in areas such as West Green, Southgate and Ifield, stimulated by Crawley's increasing commercial importance and the coming of the railway. Many cottages and villas survive from that era, and better examples have been given locally listed status. Weatherboarding (as at 6–8 Crawley Lane and Woodcote Cottage in Pound Hill, and The Open Door at Tinsley Green), tile-hung upper storeys (as at Rose Cottage, 89 and 91 Three Bridges Road and some of the Victorian pubs) and large gable ends are common features. The High Street became more formalised as a commercial area at this time, and several buildings on both sides are locally listed.

Crawley was designated a New Town in January 1947, and the Crawley Development Corporation was set up to acquire land, raise finance and provide all the buildings and services required to meet the aims of planning consultant Anthony Minoprio's masterplan—the most important of which was to reach a target population of 50,000 by 1962. Self-contained residential areas ("neighbourhoods") were laid out around the existing town centre, which was greatly extended. The ancient village of Ifield, the mostly Victorian development of Three Bridges (centred on a pre-railway era hamlet with a pub and village green) and other nearby settlements were all joined up. Each neighbourhood had standard features at its centre: one or more churches, a community centre, a shopping parade, a pub and, in some cases, schools. Some of the better-quality buildings have been awarded locally listed status. The Anglican churches in the Southgate and Gossops Green neighbourhoods (built in 1958 and 1962 respectively), Pound Hill's Roman Catholic church of 1965, with its "striking" triangular design, and the nearby United Reformed Church building (erected in 1955–57 for Congregationalists), are all on the list. So are the shopping arcades at Gossops Green and Tilgate: the former, described as "excellent" by Nikolaus Pevsner, dates from the mid-1960s, while Tilgate's is from the previous decade. The "impressive" structure was on one occasion visited by a delegation of civic dignitaries from Yugoslavia, who travelled to Crawley to inspect its architecture: such visits were common in the early New Town era (for example, more than 2,000 official visitors from 48 countries came in 1958). A 1950s primary school in Tilgate, with a distinctive tower which is believed to hide the chimney of an incinerator, also features on the list. There were few flats anywhere in the New Town, as incoming residents preferred houses, but the Deerswood Court development (which preserved the grounds of the old mansion whose site it occupied) won a Civic Trust Award and has been locally listed.

Crawley has 13 New Town neighbourhoods. Most are coterminous with an electoral ward of the same name, which are the geographical divisions used on the local list. The Pound Hill North ward, which covers the northeastern part of the borough up to the county boundary with Surrey, includes the rural hamlets of Tinsley Green and Fernhill, both of which have several locally listed buildings. They are therefore listed as part of Pound Hill North. Crawley's boundaries were extended several times in the New Town era—the area defined by the masterplan had included parts of eight local government areas and three counties—and when the borough was formed in 1974, most of the remaining parts of Surrey within the urban area became part of the borough. The rest of Fernhill, which was split between West Sussex and Surrey, was added to the borough in 1990.

== Locally listed buildings ==
| Name | Image | Area/ Coordinates | Notes | Refs |
|---|---|---|---|---|
| Bandstand in the Memorial Gardens | | Northgate; 51.1154°N 0.1866°W | This stood at Gatwick Racecourse, which opened in 1891. When it closed 57 years later, Crawley Development Corporation paid £60 for it and erected it in 1958 as the centrepiece of Queen's Square. The design of Crawley's central shopping area was considered dull at the time, but it was "enlivened by the bandstand". The bandstand was disassembled and removed from Queen's Square in June 2016 and was refurbished and moved to the Memorial Gardens in June 2018. | |
| Barclays Bank | | Three Bridges; 51.1175°N 0.1643°W | One of the many mansions around Crawley, Tilgate House was sold in the early 20th century and its estate was broken up. It was used by the Canadian Army during World War II, then became flats and was demolished. Only its former lodge survives, now converted into a Barclays Bank branch. It has a gabled cruciform roof and well-preserved walls of sandstone. | |
| Barn Theatre | | Ifield; 51.1244°N 0.2197°W | This stands near St Margaret's Church, the ancient parish church. It is 17th- or 18th-century and is attached to some brick and tile stables. In 1973, both structures were converted into the Ifield Barn Theatre and were connected by a porch. The building has a capacity of 75 and also holds exhibitions. | |
| 49 Brighton Road | | Southgate; 51.1085°N 0.1918°W | Between 1880 and 1914, the present Southgate area—around the Brighton Road south of Crawley High Street and the railway line—experienced suburban development. This was one of the 60 houses built in that era: a red-brick villa with a slate-tiled roof and much use of decorative moulding. Original features include the sash windows, twin gables with inlaid timber framing and a pilastered porch. | |
| Brooklands | | Ifield; 51.1277°N 0.2147°W | The council describes this as "a little altered late Victorian villa". The detached house stands on Rectory Lane by Ifield Green and has red stock brick walls with red fishscale tiles to the gable ends. The building also retains its old sash windows with mullions. | |
| Burstow Hall | | Fernhill; 51.1502°N 0.1408°W | The hamlet of Fernhill was part of Burstow parish in Surrey until the borough and county boundaries were extended to the M23 motorway in 1990. Buildings brought into Crawley borough include this brick and stone mansion of the mid-19th century, described as "the seat of D.M. Jackson" in 1911. Surviving features include a wing with polychromatic glazed brickwork, a "very large stone conservatory", ornate drainpipes, rustication to the quoins and sash windows. | |
| Cottage in the Wood | | Tinsley Green; 51.1436°N 0.1453°W | Architect Blunden Shadbolt specialised in a medievalising form of domestic architecture in the Picturesque style, featuring old-fashioned timber framing. This example of his work, dating from 1931 to 1933, is in a heavily wooded rural area and replaced an earlier house on the site. Between the timberwork are areas of brick panelling. | |
| 6–8 Crawley Lane | | Pound Hill; 51.1182°N 0.1533°W | Now a "placid backwater" ending in a cul-de-sac, Crawley Lane was the main east–west route to East Grinstead before the New Town was developed. Surviving houses of the 19th century include this pair of weatherboarded cottages. They date from the 1870s and also have red brickwork and old sash windows. | |
| Crawley United Reformed Church | | Pound Hill; 51.1192°N 0.1572°W | This was founded in 1955 as a Congregational church called Christ Church. Architects Lomas and Pooley designed the building, which opened in 1957. The gable ends and areas around the clerestory windows are weatherboarded, and their design echoes the flèche on the roof. A brick hall adjoins. | |
| Deerswood Court | | Ifield; 51.1224°N 0.2093°W | Deerswood was a farm and partly 15th-century timber-framed mansion southeast of Ifield village. Demolished in the 1950s, it was replaced in 1961–62 by a development of 99 flats set in three-storey blocks around the old grounds (in which a pergola survives). Architects K.H. Saunders and E.M. Bourne were responsible. Various traditional materials were used, such as clay tiles and variegated brickwork. | |
| Dyers Almshouses | | Northgate; 51.1184°N 0.1869°W | Built in three stages for the Worshipful Company of Dyers, one of the City of London's livery companies, these Arts and Crafts-style almshouses are "reminiscent of rural Dutch cottages". Arranged around a courtyard, they have prominent gable ends with large chimneys, tile-hanging, Tudor-style doors and red brickwork. Architects Bertram and Company built them in 1939–40, 1952 and 1971. | |
| Gatwick House | | Fernhill; 51.1543°N 0.1377°W | Since its conversion into offices, this building has been extended several times in various styles, but the original 11-bay country house of 1876 survives. It is a concrete-faced Gothic Revival two-storey structure with a castellated parapet and tower. To the rear are 19th-century red-brick and 20th-century Neo-Georgian sections. | |
| Gatwick Manor Lodge | | Povey Cross; 51.1660°N 0.1821°W | The medieval Gatwick Manor survives and is a Grade II* listed building, but nothing remains of its old estate or associated buildings except this former lodge, on the other side of Gatwick Airport at Povey Cross. A single-storey structure with bargeboarded gables, purple glazed brickwork and external stonework, it also retains its tiled roof and mullioned windows. | |
| Goffs Park House | | Southgate; 51.1110°N 0.2000°W | William Buck designed this country house, whose extensive grounds are now Goffs Park, for Edwin Henty in 1882. Horsham-based builders Peter and Redford built it for £3,750. Later it became council offices, and now houses Crawley Museum and a branch of the National Probation Service. The red-brick, Bath Stone and sandstone building combines the Queen Anne Revival and Vernacular styles. | |
| Gossops Green Shopping Parade | | Gossops Green; 51.1110°N 0.2163°W | Although work on this neighbourhood started in 1956 and the houses were finished by 1961, this three-storey terraced shopping parade dates from a few years later. Described as "excellent" by Nikolaus Pevsner, it has two levels of flats above the shops, which are recessed under a concrete colonnade. Fishscale tiles decorate the side elevations, and the middle storey has square bay windows. | |
| Grand Parade | | West Green; 51.1154°N 0.1905°W | A symbol of the pre-war urbanisation of Crawley, this parade of shops (never finished as originally planned, and extended in the 1950s) was built in 1939 and housed chain stores such as Woolworths and Boots which had previously considered the town too insignificant. Its symmetrical 17-bay façade has a projecting central section topped with a cedar wood spire. Some houses were demolished to make way for the Neoclassical brick-faced structure. | |
| 55–59 Grattons Drive | | Pound Hill; 51.1263°N 0.1550°W | Now a terrace of three houses, this "architecturally impressive" painted brick building was originally part of a farm. Decorative features include brick string-courses and dentils, a shingled and spire-capped central tower and rows of clay ridge tiles in front of the roof. | |
| Greyhound Cottage | | Tinsley Green; 51.1409°N 0.1597°W | This is a two-storey house attributed to either the 1780s or a few decades later. The upper storey is hung with red clay tiles; below that are stock bricks which have now been painted. The bargeboarded porch is not original, and no old windows survive. | |
| Greyhound Inn | | Tinsley Green; 51.1410°N 0.1590°W | The centuries-old Sussex tradition of marble-playing on Good Friday was reintroduced at this pub in Tinsley Green, one of the old centres of the game, and it now hosts the British and World Marbles Championship. The 1930s building combines the Neoclassical and Arts and Crafts styles. A round, conical-roofed projecting entrance bay is fronted by a Doric-columned arcade with a balcony on top. | |
| 107 Hazelwick Road | | Three Bridges; 51.1195°N 0.1673°W | The Victorian-era developer of Hazelwick Road built this "substantial villa" for himself and his family. Red and brown brickwork, ridge tiles, original sash windows and decorative quoins around the entrance are all in evidence on the detached house. | |
| 31–33 High Street | | Northgate; 51.1138°N 0.1904°W | A tall three-storey building of the early Victorian era, this has a Classical appearance. There are paired first-floor windows set below pediments and flanked by single hood-moulded windows, and above a string-course runs across the width of the building. Some of the windows are original sashes. | |
| 37 High Street | | Northgate; 51.1140°N 0.1903°W | The most prominent feature of this mid-19th-century building is its top-floor oriel window. This suggests the building was originally a workshop. Below this, a 19th-century wooden shopfront survives. | |
| 41–43 High Street | | Northgate; 51.1143°N 0.1902°W | Although they are connected, these buildings are of different eras and have few similarities. Number 41, on a corner site, is early-19th-century and has a tile-hung upper storey. An "interesting" carved gable and original sash windows also survive. Number 43 has a three-bay façade set below a gable, sash windows and stucco-clad walls. The ground-floor shop unit detracts from the building's historic interest. | |
| 47 High Street | | Northgate; 51.1145°N 0.1902°W | This mid-terrace building adjoins the Ancient Priors, a timber-framed medieval hall house. The building has sash windows and an old clay-tiled roof. An 18th-century date has been attributed. | |
| 11 Horsham Road | | West Green; 51.1143°N 0.1965°W | The Vernacular style of the mid-Victorian era is exemplified by this "well-preserved and restrained" house (now in commercial use) in the West Green area. Carefully pointed red brickwork, 19th-century sash windows and a panelled gabled porch survive. The symmetrical façade has two bays. The northern part of Horsham Road on which this house stands was built up between the 1870s and 1910s. | |
| 1–4 Ifield Road | | West Green; 51.1144°N 0.1909°W | These buildings are all two-storey but date from various points during the 17th and 18th centuries. All were converted into shops in the 19th century. Many alterations have been made since, including the replacement of most windows with modern double glazing, and little survives of the original Victorian shop units. | |
| Ifield Steam Mill | | Ifield; 51.1265°N 0.2148°W | This former steam mill, which had a beam engine inside, has been converted for other purposes but retains its brick lower section and weatherboarding above. The gable ends have carved bargeboards. The building was extended in the 1860s, but may have ceased operations as early as World War I. | |
| 108–122 MaIthouse Road | | Southgate; 51.1078°N 0.1888°W | Malthouse Road was developed between the 1880s and 1900s with a range of high-quality red-brick houses in various styles by local building firm James Longley & Company. This curving row of semi-detached villas retain many original features, such as stained glass, sash windows, panelled doors and timber porches. | |
| Masons Hall | | Southgate; 51.1102°N 0.1987°W | Built in 1905 in a "rather eccentric" style reminiscent of a Tuscan villa, this stucco-faced detached building has a rear corner tower in the style of a campanile. It is topped with a shallow terracotta-tiled roof, as is the main part of the building. It was also known as Goffs Tower and had six bedrooms. | |
| Newbridge and Zell Cottages | | Tinsley Green; 51.1407°N 0.1605°W | These 18th-century buildings have been altered, but remain as examples of early artisan accommodation in the rural areas around Crawley. Original features include the slate roof and the weatherboarded upper storeys. | |
| Nightingale House | | Southgate; 51.1124°N 0.1908°W | This was built by local resident Moses Nightingale in 1901 and was originally a bank branch. It was threatened with demolition in 2008, but survives on a prominent corner site near the railway line. There is a "striking copper turret" at one corner, gable-topped oriel windows, intricate Gothic Revival detail at ground-floor level, and a combination of stonework and red brick. | |
| 7–25 North Road | | Three Bridges; 51.1178°N 0.1674°W | Despite considerable alteration over the years, these 19th-century artisans' cottages are on the local list because of their historical association with pre-New Town Crawley. They may have been built for railway workers at Three Bridges station and goods yard, or for employees of the more distant Worth Park estate. The road probably existed in the 16th century, although before the 1840s there were few houses. | |
| Oak House | | Ifield; 51.1268°N 0.2135°W | This is a detached villa-style house of the late 19th century, with sash windows flanking a central entrance bay which features a projecting gabled porch. The building is red-brick throughout. | |
| Old Post Office and Malvern Cottage | | Ifield; 51.1273°N 0.2132°W | These semi-detached cottages have been dated to the 1890s. One was originally Ifield village's post office, which gives the building additional historic significance. There are bay windows at ground-floor level, and the quoins are picked out in a different shade of brickwork. | |
| Park Lodge | | Southgate; 51.1089°N 0.1951°W | This building has been altered substantially since it was built in the late 19th century, and some original decorative features have been lost. Nevertheless, it retains the general appearance of a Victorian villa. | |
| Parsons Pig Inn | | Tinsley Green; 51.1434°N 0.1464°W | A Premier Inn hotel has been built in the grounds of this pub on the Balcombe Road, but it retains its late-19th-century appearance. The architectural style is Arts and Crafts, as demonstrated by the timber-framed gable ends, tile-hanging and large chimneys. The brick-built ground floor has an entrance porch. | |
| Poplars | | Fernhill; 51.1555°N 0.1410°W | This is a three-bay detached house with ground-floor bay windows flanking an open porch at ground-floor level and three evenly spaced windows above. No original windows survive from its mid-19th-century construction, but the slate roof has not been altered. | |
| 1 Pullcotts Farm Cottages | | Fernhill; 51.1530°N 0.1393°W | This three-bay house has polychromatic brickwork at ground-floor level and tile-hanging in various styles above. The windows are all original sashes, but the roof and entrance doors have been modernised. | |
| Rectory Farmhouse | | Ifield; 51.1239°N 0.2201°W | This "large and handsome" house of the 1860s stands behind St Margaret's Church. It has red brickwork, a slate roof and a central entrance porch which is characteristic of its era. | |
| Rose Cottage | | Pound Hill; 51.1346°N 0.1467°W | This late-19th-century detached house on the Balcombe Road has a double-pitched roof with a chimney in the "valley". The ground floor is of red brick; between this and the first-floor tile-hanging is a brick string-course with dentil decoration. | |
| Royal Oak House | | Fernhill; 51.1584°N 0.1377°W | Dating from the 1880s, this villa-style detached house has stuccoed walls and a partly jettied upper storey. The sash windows are original, and one of the side windows is a bay. A small cottage, possibly older, stands next to the house. | |
| Royal Oak Inn | | Ifield; 51.1271°N 0.2136°W | One of two old inns in Ifield village (The Plough is the other), this building dates from the mid-19th century or earlier. Ironstone is the main building material, unusually for the Crawley area, but there are red-brick quoins and string-courses. Original features include the side chimneys and the casement windows, but the main façade is dominated by a 1960s extension. | |
| St Alban's Church | | Gossops Green; 51.1106°N 0.2175°W | Nikolaus Pevsner considered it "not a match for" the contemporary shopping parade opposite, but this Anglican church of 1962 by Thomas S. Ford is a significant feature of Gossops Green neighbourhood centre. With its tall, chimney-like campanile, it is also a prominent landmark. The materials include steel, concrete and brick, and the roof is covered with felt and aluminium. | |
| St Edward the Confessor's Church | | Pound Hill; 51.1166°N 0.1485°W | This church was constructed from reinforced concrete and limestone in 1965 to the design of Alexander Lane and has an integrated church hall. The floorplan forms two triangles. Extensive areas of glass in the walls cause glare and solar gain inside, but the exterior is considered by the council to be a "striking architectural design". | |
| St Mary's Church | | Southgate; 51.1055°N 0.1865°W | Henry Braddock and D.F. Martin-Smith's 1958 building is designed so that the adjoining church hall can be used as an extension of the main church. The roof has a centrally positioned flèche on top of a small, boxlike bell tower. One wall consists of concrete slabs pierced with decorative shards of blue glass. | |
| St Peter's Church | | West Green; 51.1150°N 0.1956°W | This large and internally spacious church was designed between 1892 and 1893 by W. Hilton Nash and built by Richard Cook, owner of a large building firm in the town. It replaced a nearby chapel of ease to St Margaret's Church. The Gothic Revival building has sandstone walls and a bellcote with a Celtic cross. Construction cost £2,800, and the church can hold 439 worshippers. | |
| South Lodge | | Pound Hill; 51.1162°N 0.1438°W | This single-storey l-shaped lodge has a prominent and ornate chimney in the centre of the roof, which is of Horsham Stone. The walls are of red brick, and the gable ends are of the Dutch gable style. | |
| Swan Inn | | West Green; 51.1148°N 0.1959°W | Dating from the late 19th century, this pub has Arts and Crafts features and is in two parts: the main gable-roofed section and a flat-roofed wing which is probably contemporary with the rest of the building. This part has a cast iron balcony. Red brickwork, tile-hanging of various styles and decorative panelling are all in evidence. | |
| The Oaks Primary School | | Tilgate; 51.1034°N 0.1754°W | This school has its origins in the Bishop Bell junior and infants school of 1958–59. An "eye-catching tower with a w-shaped roof" is the main feature on the building, which has one- and two-storey sections. | |
| The Open Door | | Tinsley Green; 51.1423°N 0.1473°W | The two-storey house faces Balcombe Road and has red brickwork, weatherboarding and a slate-tiled roof. It dates from the late 18th century. | |
| 89 and 91 Three Bridges Road | | Three Bridges; 51.1158°N 0.1753°W | These may have been farm cottages from the time when there was agricultural land between Three Bridges and Crawley. Features include a large and ornate chimney-stack and fishscale tiles to the upper storey; these are separated from the ground-floor brickwork by a dentil string-course. | |
| 215–223 Three Bridges Road | | Three Bridges; 51.1177°N 0.1649°W | This is a terrace of five houses with a gabled central section and original porches. Also dating back to the late 19th century are the wooden decoration and some of the sash windows, although most have been replaced with more modern fittings. | |
| Tilgate Shopping Parade | | Tilgate; 51.1022°N 0.1807°W | Work on the Tilgate neighbourhood started in 1955. Its "impressive" curved shopping parade reflects the desire of the New Town architects to make the neighbourhood centres different from one another through the use of different layouts and architectural detail, and the council considers it the best such example. The ground-floor shops are recessed behind a concrete-columned arcade, above which are two storeys of housing. | |
| Touchwood Chapel | | Fernhill; 51.1556°N 0.1381°W | This was built in 1885 and was described in 1911 as a Baptist chapel in Burstow parish (of which Fernhill was an outlying settlement until boundary changes brought it into West Sussex). It has become a house, the red-brick walls have been painted and the windows have been modernised, but the slate roof remains from the original building. | |
| 1 Victoria Road | | West Green; 51.1145°N 0.1943°W | Dating from the 1790s, this is a "historic vernacular building of clear local interest"—although the council considers it unsuitable for statutory (national) listing because it has been altered too much. The ground floor is brick, while the upper storey is hung with tiles. | |
| Woodcote Cottage | | Pound Hill; 51.1175°N 0.1505°W | The roof of this "attractive" partly weatherboarded detached house of the 1840s is double-pitched, forming an m-shape. The ground floor is built of brick which has now been painted over. | |
| Worth Park Lodge | | Pound Hill; 51.1188°N 0.1572°W | Now in commercial use, this early-20th-century red-brick house was originally a lodge on the Worth Park estate. Classical and Baroque design elements survive. A wooden veranda with decorative fretwork spans the building above the ground floor. The quoins are rusticated. | |
| Worth Training Centre Annexe | | Pound Hill; 51.1169°N 0.1473°W | The training school itself is a Grade II-listed building. This structure, built as a school in 1852 and extended in brick in 1894, is now part of the complex. The earlier section is of sandstone. Both parts have large gables, which are tile-hung on the 1894 section. | |

== See also ==
- Listed buildings in Crawley
- List of conservation areas in Crawley
