= Public services in Crawley =

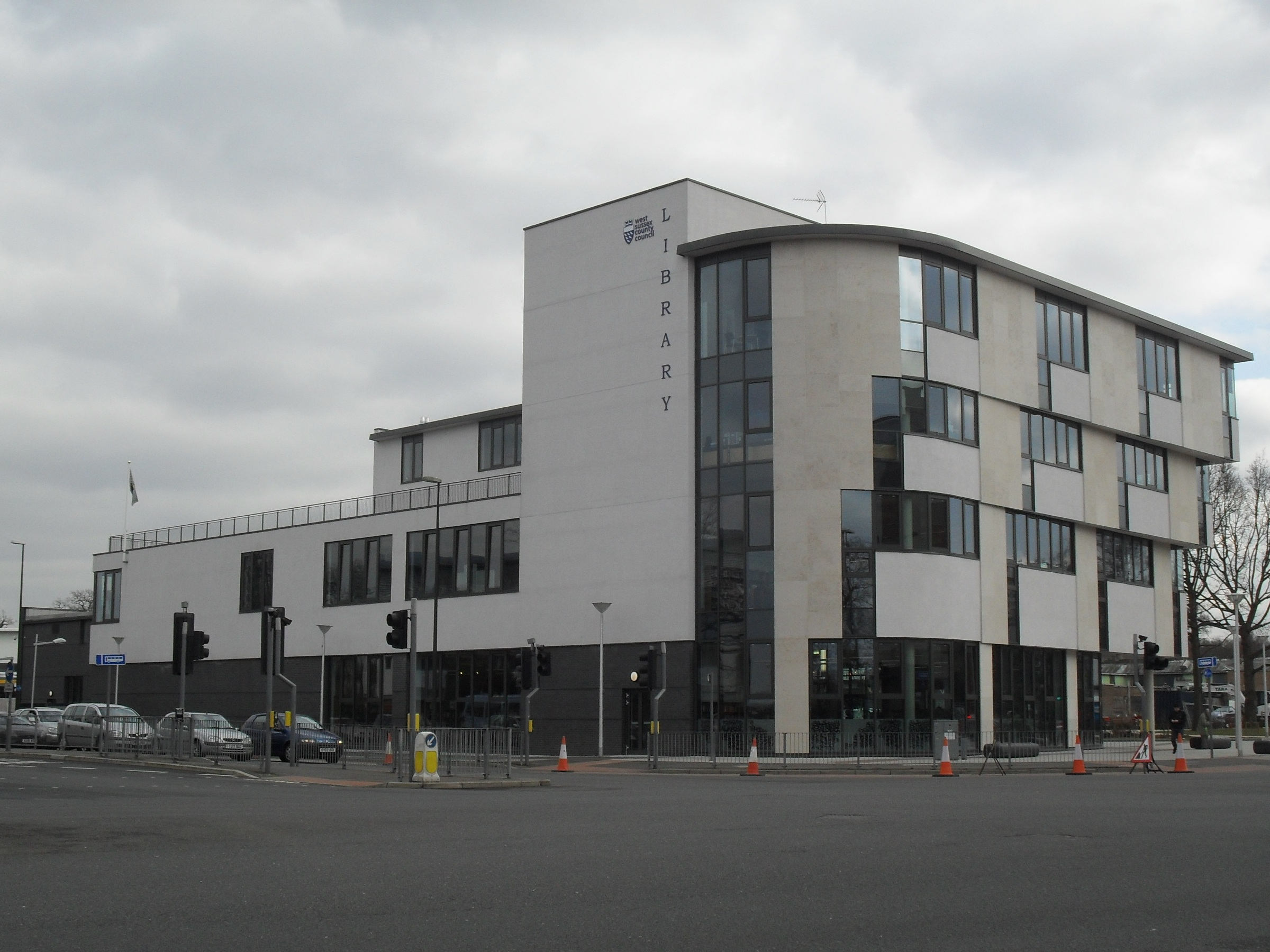
Crawley Library opened in 2008.

Crawley, a postwar New Town and borough in the English county of West Sussex, has a wide range of public services funded by national government, West Sussex County Council, Crawley Borough Council and other public-sector bodies. Revenue to fund these services comes principally from Council Tax. Some of Crawley's utilities and infrastructure are provided by outside parties, such as utility companies and West Sussex County Council, rather than by the borough council. To help pay for improved infrastructure and service provision in proposed major residential developments such as Kilnwood Vale and the North East Sector, the borough council has stated that as part of the Crawley Local Plan it would require developers to pay a Community Infrastructure Levy.

Originally a "quiet, prosperous area" with a population of a few thousand people, Crawley was selected as the site of a New Town under the provisions of the New Towns Act 1946 (9 & 10 Geo. 6. c. 68). Crawley Development Corporation was formed in 1947 to establish, administer and control the town's development, including the provision of services. Sewerage, drainage, and the supply of water, gas and electricity were all planned and laid out for the town as a whole, rather than for the 13 residential neighbourhoods individually. Services were prioritised early in the development process: the New Town was designated in January 1947, and by 1949 the Development Corporation had surveyed the designated area, (Note: This is defined as the 5,920-acre (2,400 ha) area of land designated for development under the New Towns Act 1946 (9 & 10 Geo. 6. c. 68), to which the Anthony Minoprio's master plan would be applied.) planned and designed the required infrastructure and negotiated some contracts for their construction. Because work focused on the provision of services at first, housebuilding in the new town was slow in the first few years. An important feature of the master plan was the laying of sewer and utility pipes under grass verges rather than beneath roads, as was conventional in Britain; this made them more accessible and reduced disruption during improvement works.

== Police and courts ==
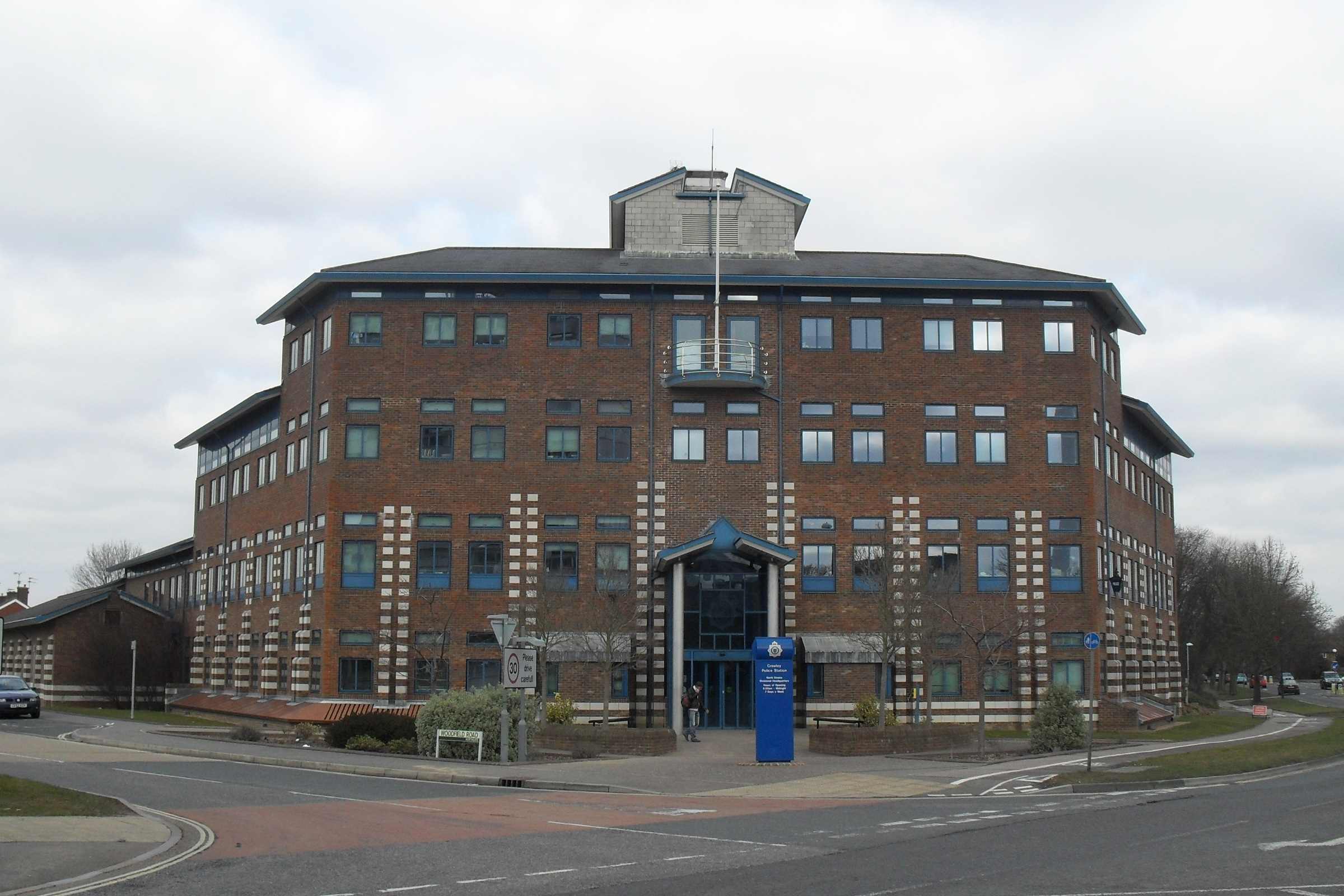
Crawley police station

Crawley police station is at the junction of Woodfield Road and Northgate Road (51.120011°N 0.180957°W) in Northgate on the edge of the town centre. Its front desk is open to the public 11 hours per day except on Sundays; until 2011 it was open daily from 8.00am until midnight. There is also a police station (not open to the public) on the perimeter road at Gatwick Airport. Both are operated by the West Sussex Division of Sussex Police. In January 2013, a community hub was established at Broadfield Library to provide a full-time police presence in that neighbourhood. In July 2013, the force announced that Crawley police station would not be closed during a forthcoming rationalistion of buildings, and would instead be refurbished.

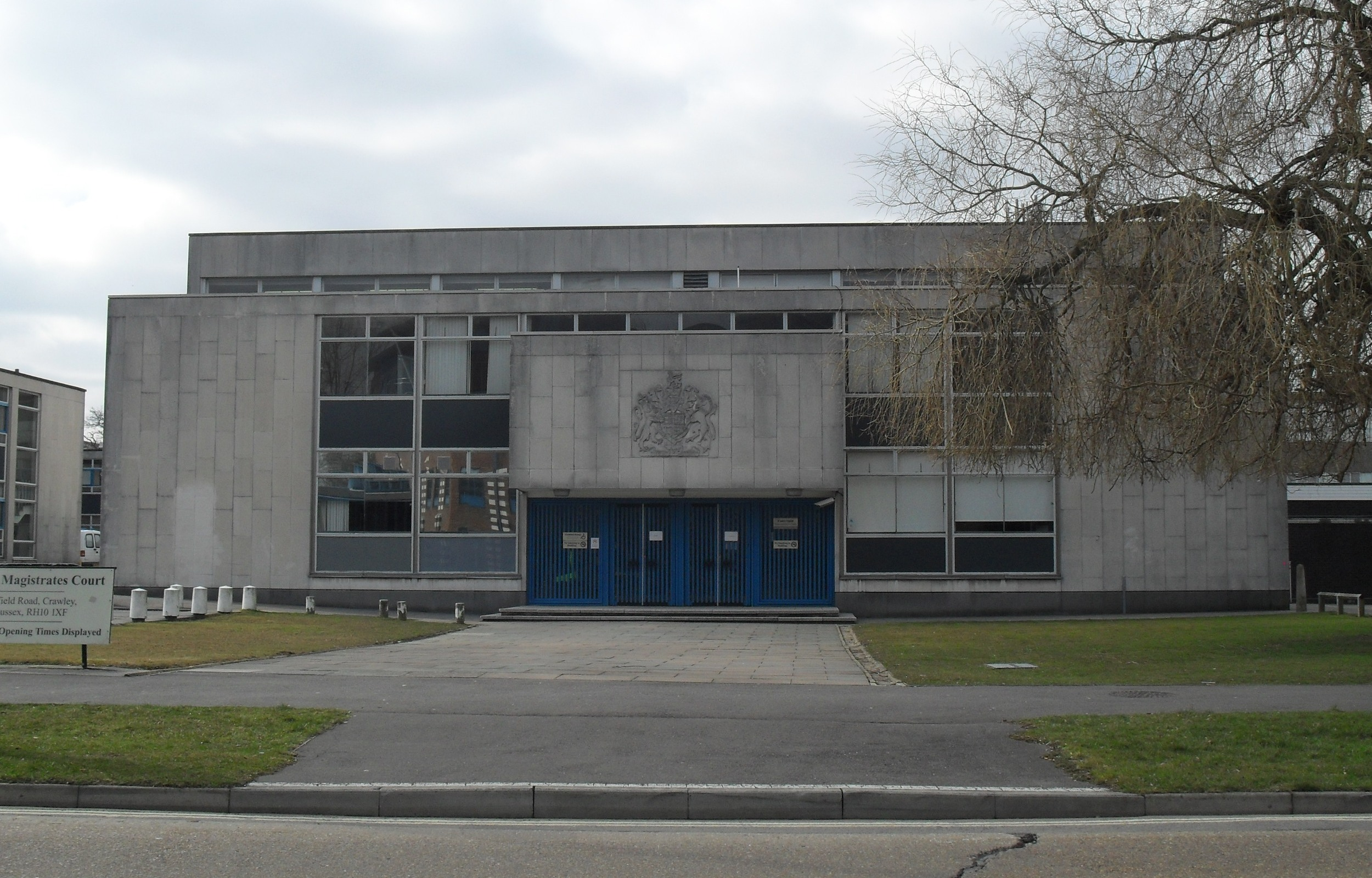
Crawley Magistrates Court

Crawley's first police station opened in 1883 on Station Road. West Sussex County Council built a combined police station and courthouse in 1963 between Northgate Avenue, Exchange Road and Woodfield Road; the old police station still stood in 1984, but by 1986 it was demolished as the whole road was redeveloped with offices. The 1960s police station was itself replaced in the late 1990s by the present building on the opposite side of Woodfield Road. The new building was designed by the council's architects and cost £7 million. Tully De'Ath Consultants were the project's civil engineers. The five-storey concrete-framed building was designed to resemble an office block and has an underground car park. A tunnel was built under Woodfield Road to allow people to walk between the building and the magistrates court opposite. The site covers 6,150 square metres (66,200 sq ft). The project was first put out to tender in August 1994.

The courthouse remains in use as Crawley Magistrates Court (51.117468°N 0.182168°W). It has three courtrooms. Refurbishment work was undertaken in 2012, but only the ground floor is accessible to disabled people as there is no lift access to the first floor, where two of the courtrooms are situated.

== Fire protection ==
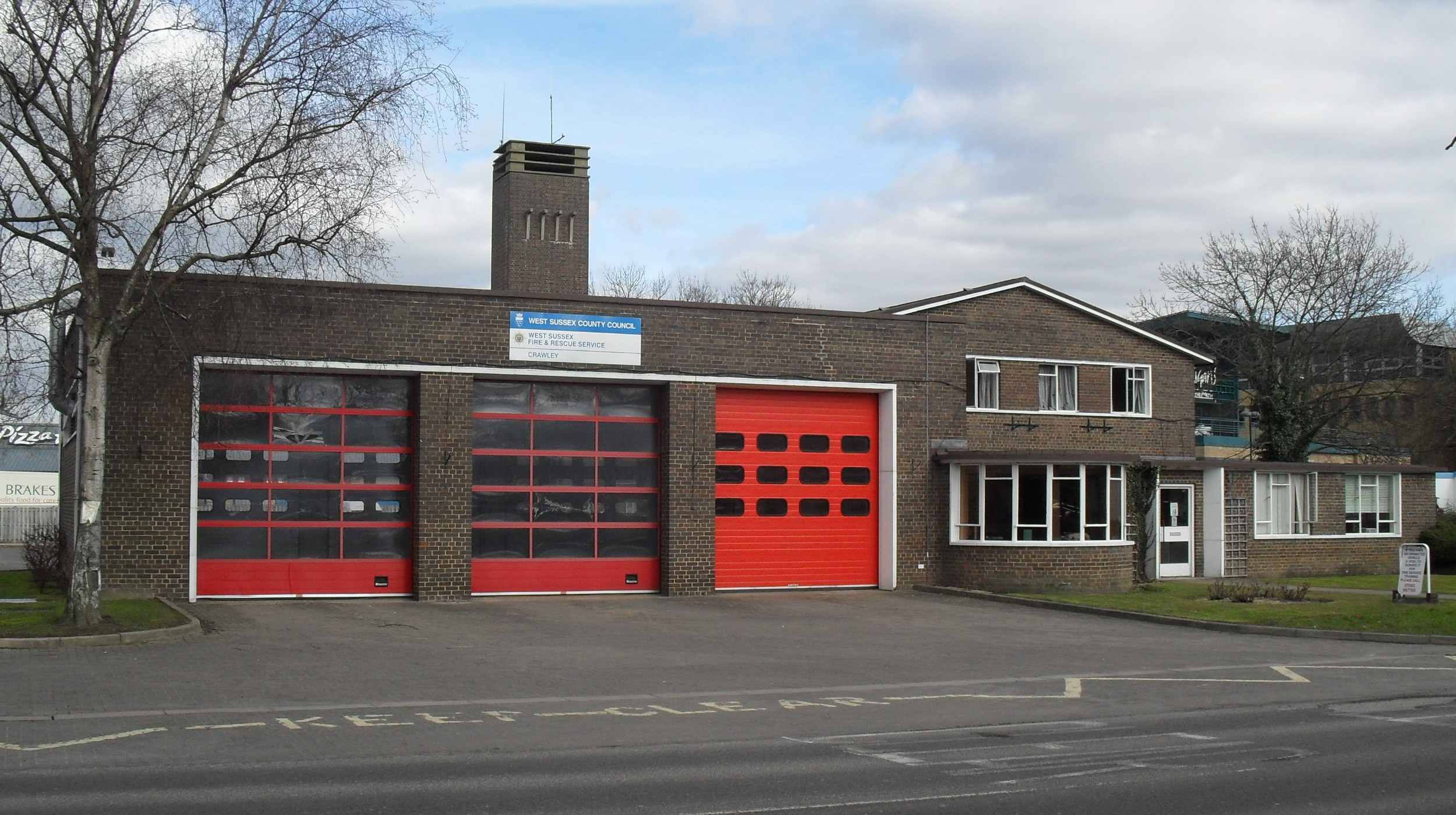
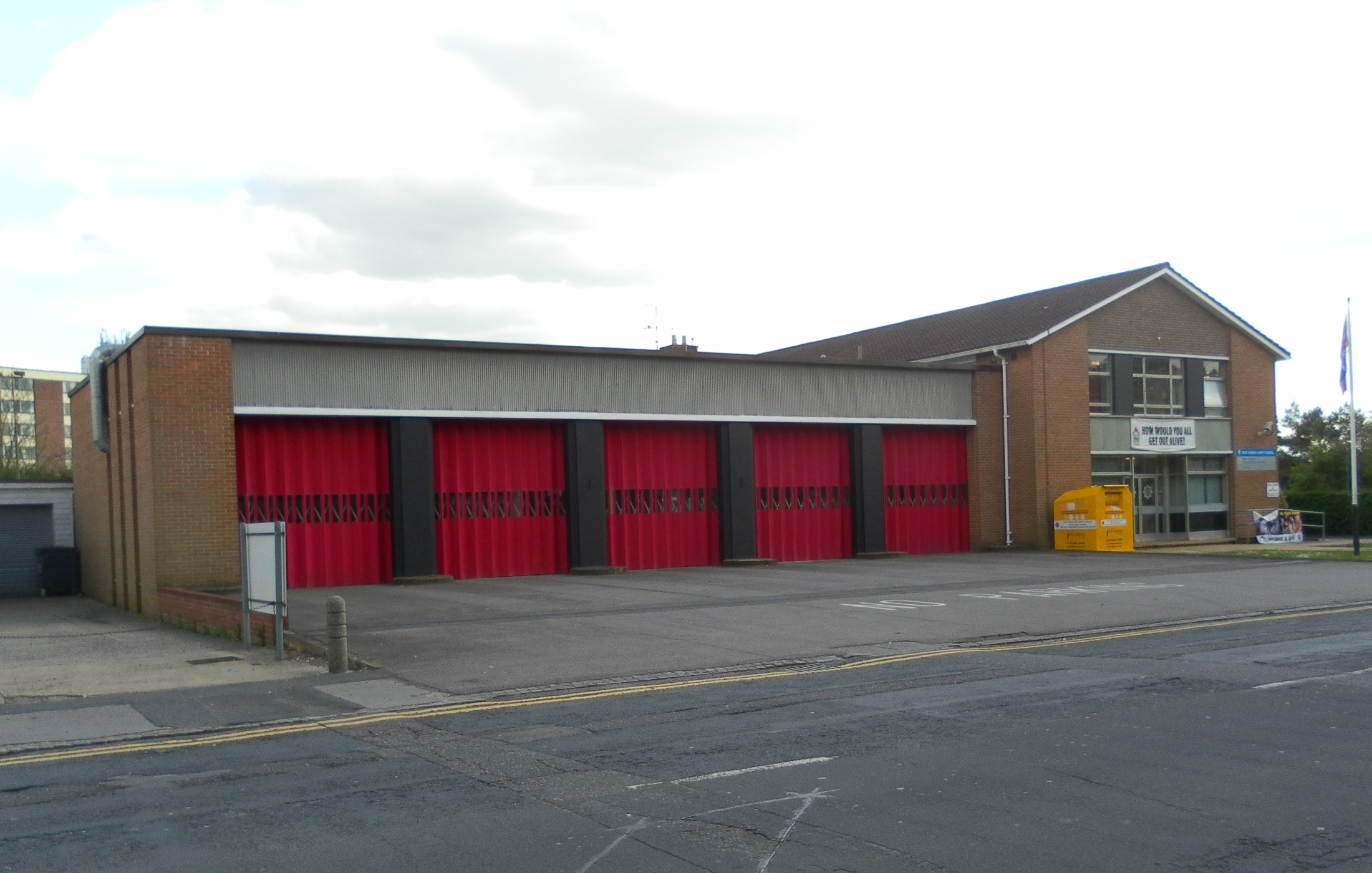
Crawley (left) and Horley (right) fire stations

There are two fire stations in the borough. Crawley fire station on Ifield Avenue (51.119375°N 0.189406°W) opened in 1957, although building work started in 1955 and continued until 1958. It is operated by the West Sussex Fire and Rescue Service, a council body, under the provisions of the Fire and Rescue Services Act 2004. The five-bay station has immediate response and retained firefighters, and its equipment includes three water tenders and a heavy rescue tender. Horley fire station is situated on Povey Cross Road (51.166716°N 0.179585°W) on the edge of Gatwick Airport, just inside the West Sussex border. It is operated jointly by West Sussex and Surrey Fire and Rescue Services.

In the early years of the New Town, volunteer firefighters covered Crawley until it was large enough to justify the construction of the new fire station, which like the police station was built by West Sussex County Council. When Crawley was a small market town in the late 19th and early 20th centuries, there had been a fire station on land which was part of the 2,055-acre (832 ha) Worth Park estate owned by the Montefiore family. This estate was auctioned in 1915. Built in 1866 and founded by a group of residents including Mark Lemon, this fire station stood on a different site on Ifield Road and survived in alternative use until the 1960s. From 1932, the volunteer firefighters were administered by a committee which raised money by means of rates for each household in the parishes of Crawley, Ifield, Rusper and Worth.

== Healthcare ==
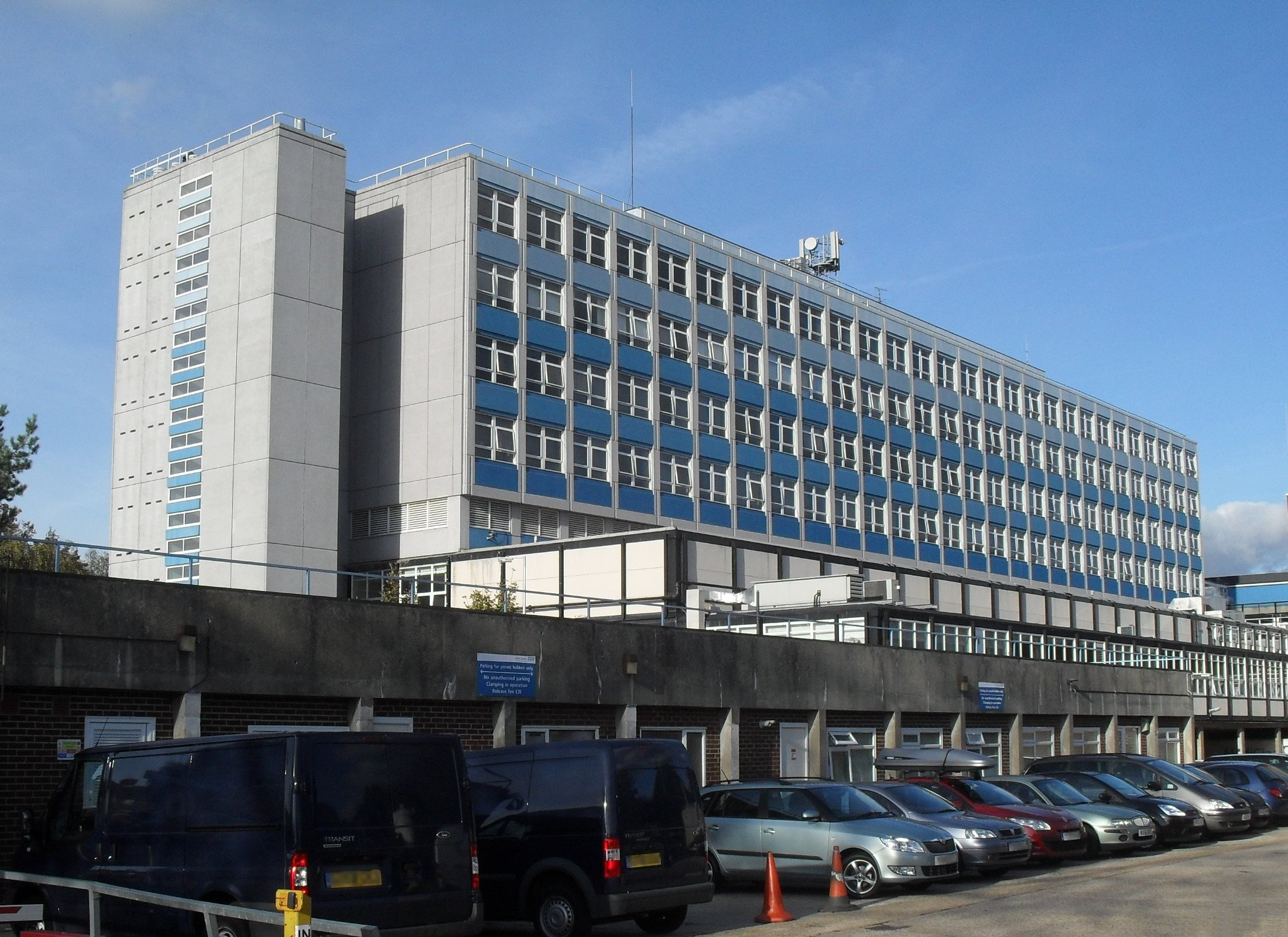
Crawley Hospital

A cottage hospital with six beds opened in Crawley in 1896. By 1922 there were 12 beds and an operating theatre. Patients paid as much as they could afford for treatment; financial support was also given by the public—"something for which the whole community readily united". These premises became too small, and a new "district hospital" was established at Ifield Lodge in West Green—then a mostly residential area west of Crawley High Street—in the 1930s.

The master plan determined that a larger hospital was needed, and set aside land for it near the Hawth Theatre southeast of the town centre. Support from the Development Corporation and Crawley Urban District Council was overridden at regional level: the regional health authority decided to rebuild Crawley Hospital, which according to the master plan was to be demolished and replaced by houses. The Development Corporation was frustrated over the "prevarication", in view of Crawley's rapid growth at the time (by the mid-1950s, there were about 20 births per week), and the Ministry of Health ordered a public inquiry in 1958. The decision was upheld, and construction work on a new building on the existing site (51.116556°N 0.197524°W) started the following year. There were three phases of construction: 1959–61, 1966–70 and 1981. Crawley Hospital remains in use and is operated by the Surrey and Sussex NHS Trust. The large site reserved for the planned hospital is now in residential use as Arden Road, part of the Furnace Green neighbourhood.

West Sussex County Council built a central clinic on The Boulevard near Crawley Town Hall in 1959–61, although provision had been made in the master plan for three smaller clinics spread throughout the town. The town's original ambulance station was on Exchange Road; built in 1963, it was replaced by the early 1980s by a new building on Ifield Road (51.12159°N 0.197275°W) near the fire station. It is operated by the South East Coast Ambulance Service, as are the Ambulance Community Response Posts at Balcombe Road in the Pound Hill area and airside at Gatwick Airport.

In 2013, Bio City Ltd—a science park development company—put forward proposals for a combined biological sciences park, residential development and hospital. It would be privately funded but would offer NHS services. Suggested sites in the Crawley area are at Pease Pottage Hill and at a former industrial site at Manor Royal. Crawley Borough Council, Horsham Borough Council and West Sussex County Council have given their support to the plans.

== Post and telephones ==
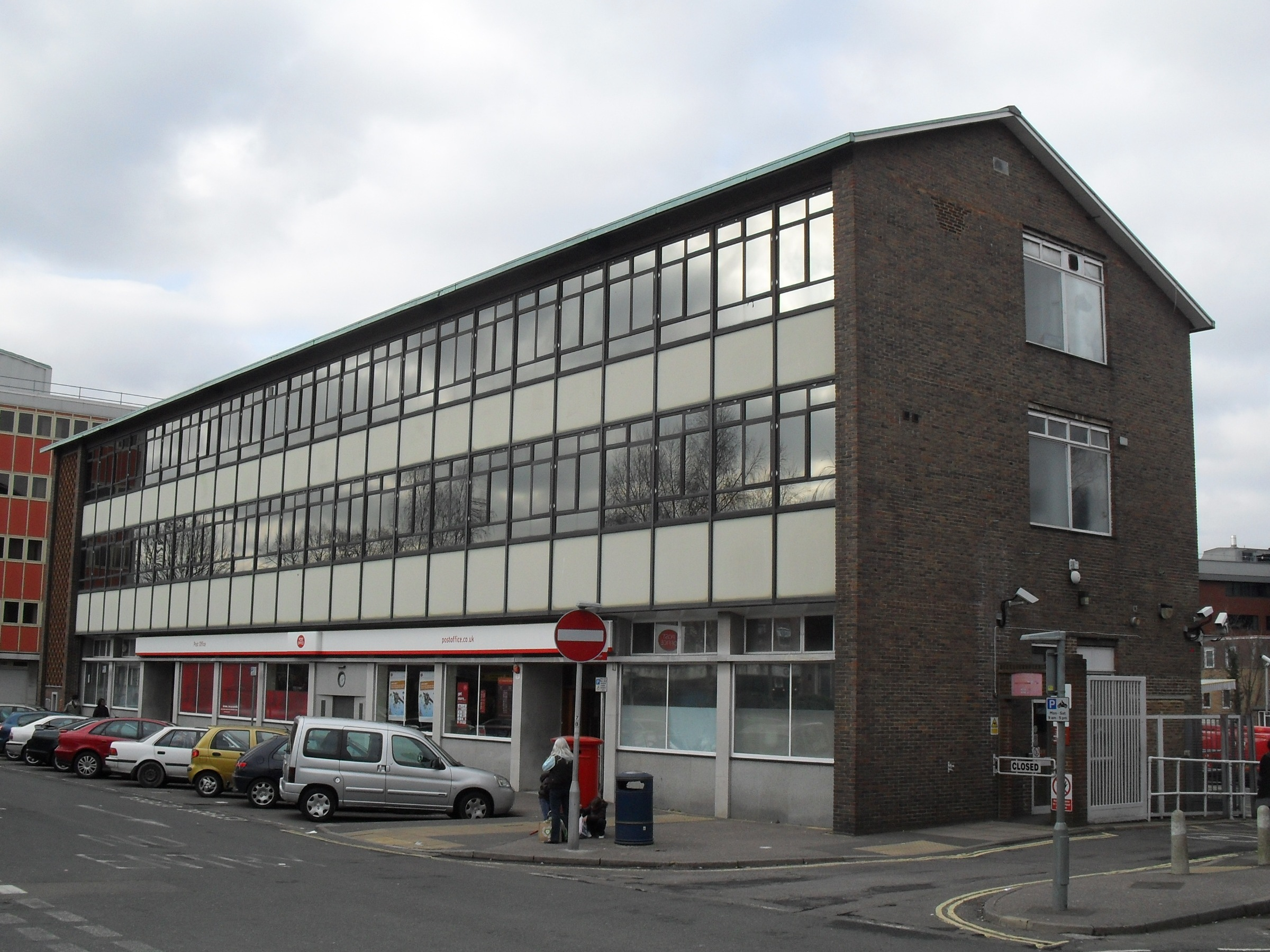
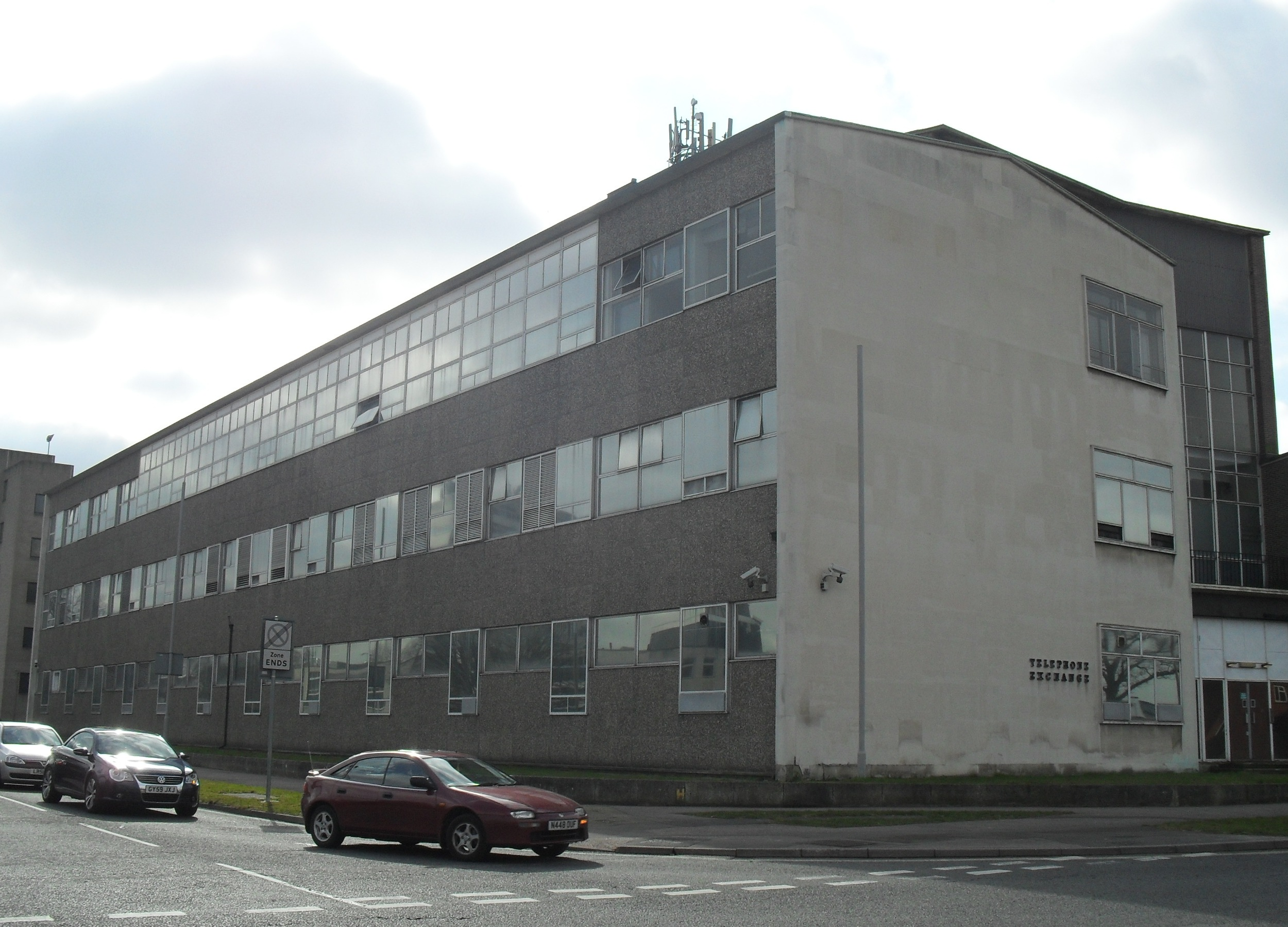
The main post office (left) and telephone exchange (right)

From the 1750s, East Grinstead was the nearest post town to Crawley: it acted as a centre for distributing letters and sending them for onward transport. By 1791, post was delivered on foot to Crawley and Ifield three times a week. There was a central "receiving house" in Crawley from which post was collected and taken to East Grinstead. After a brief interval in which Uckfield was the post town, Crawley became one in its own right in 1810 and daily mail coaches ran between London and Brighton, stopping in the town for a change of horses. James Swift was appointed the town's first postmaster in the 1820s, and soon afterwards the first proper post office was built next to the White Hart Inn. This was replaced in 1895 or 1905 by a building on New Road (originally named Church Road) near the level crossing on High Street. New Road was soon renamed Post Office Road accordingly. In 1928 it moved to a new location on the High Street, although Post Office Road bore that name until 1939. The present central post office was built on The Boulevard (51.116812°N 0.188077°W) in 1959; sub-post offices were provided in most of the neighbourhoods in the 1950s.

A telegram office and telephone exchange were available from the early 20th century at the post office. The telephone rapidly gained popularity: another exchange was built in Pound Hill in 1916, by which time 100 households had a telephone line. A large new telephone exchange (51.117846°N 0.183507°W) was erected in 1961 at the junction of Kilnmead and a new road which took the name Exchange Road.

== Library ==
The county council established a public library in 1951 in some temporary buildings. From 1963 its permanent home became the new county buildings complex (which also included the Town Hall, courthouse and police station). A second library was opened in 1980 in the new Broadfield neighbourhood. On 16 December 2008, the present Crawley Library opened on a new site (51.113815°N 0.182323°W) at the junction of Southgate Avenue and Haslett Avenue East, just east of the town centre. The building was designed by architects Penoyre & Prasad and cost £12.5 million. The complex has four storeys of offices for civic, social service and administrative functions, including a register office, as well as the three-storey library. The exterior is of stone and glass, and each storey projects slightly beyond the one below. The 45,000-square-foot (4,200 m^{2}) complex faces a landscaped public square. Mace Group were employed as the project managers. Work started in January 2006 and was completed on schedule. The building won the West Sussex Design and Sustainability Award in 2009.

== Gas and electricity ==
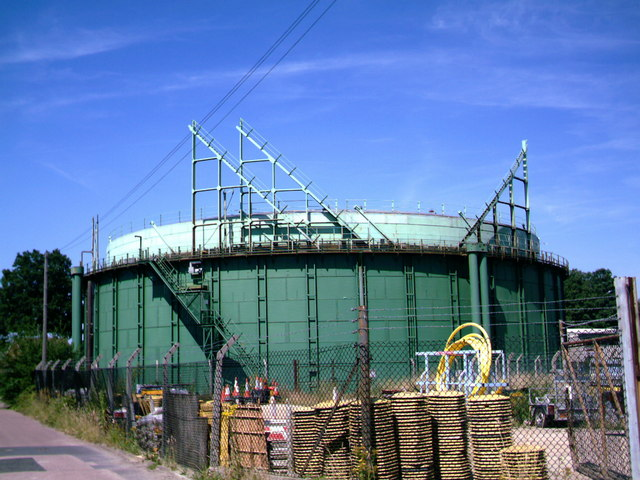
Gas holder at Horley gasworks

There was a gasworks on London Road just north of Crawley from 1859, when it supplied street lighting to the town. Crawley later received its gas supply from the Horley gasworks across the border in Surrey: the Horley District Gas Company was founded in 1886 and acquired the Crawley Gas Company and its gasworks in 1901. The master plan stated that more capacity was needed to serve the projected population of the designated area. In the late 1940s, several groups got together to propose improvements to the gas supply to a large area of east Surrey and Crawley New Town: the Development Corporation, three gas companies (the Horley, East Surrey and Croydon District Gas Companies) and the Ministry of Fuel and Power. They decided that Waddon gasworks in Croydon should be enlarged enough to meet the needs of all three gas companies' supply areas and those of Crawley. Gas mains were laid out in the designated area in 1949, and between then and 1953 a high-pressure gas main was built to link the network with Waddon gasworks, 20 miles (32 km) to the north. The gasworks at Horley and Redhill were also expanded to give greater storage capacity. As of 2013, Scotia Gas Networks (through their Southern Gas Networks division) are responsible for gas distribution to Crawley.

Crawley first received electricity in 1909 or 1910 when a generator powered by steam was installed by the Sussex Electricity Supply Company of Burgess Hill. This company also offered to connect houses to the electricity supply. Another generator was built in 1917 at Cross Keys off the High Street; it had a resident engineer who also offered installation services. The master plan for the New Town anticipated that there was enough capacity available to meet the town's needs in its early years. As of 2013, the electricity distribution network operator covering Crawley is UK Power Networks.

At first, responsibility for street lighting was split between the different parish councils in which Crawley lay. Crawley Development Corporation organised the three councils, the British Electricity Authority and SEEBOARD (the local electricity board) in a working party to ensure coverage was suitable and uniform across the town. The Development Corporation had the responsibility for all new installations of street lighting in Crawley's neighbourhoods. It also investigated the concept of centrally supplied heating for the whole town, powered by either electricity or coal, after a similar scheme was put in place in Stevenage, another New Town. It decided there was no economic justification for it because of the lack of coalfields and "no desire to generate electricity [on a large scale] within the town".

== Water supply ==
Crawley lies partly on Weald Clay and partly on the Hastings Beds of sandstone. Small areas of limestone and sandstone are also found on the surface of the clay in some areas. These areas had many small springs which were used by the early residents of Crawley. As the town grew, especially in the 19th century, many springs were lost under buildings, so ponds and wells were dug in many places and some houses installed water pumps to extract water directly from nearby springs. Streams were also used for this purpose: the River Mole, which rises in the area, has many small tributaries.

A proper public water supply was started in 1897 or 1898 when the Crawley and District Water Company was founded by three local businessmen. They dug a borehole in some land they had bought in Southgate, and built a reservoir into which the water was pumped. It supplied the whole of Crawley and neighbouring Three Bridges. To supplement this, water was also pumped from Balcombe, a few miles to the south, to Tilgate; a storage tank was also built at Pease Pottage. Then from September 1915, Weir Wood Reservoir on the River Medway became the main source of water for Crawley when a pipeline was built from there. The various Rural District Councils covering Crawley became responsible for water supply in 1926. A year before this, the Crawley and District Water Company's facility was taken over by Horsham Rural District Council. It was still used at first, but fell out of use by 1946. There was also a waterworks at Ifield by 1928.

The New Town master plan anticipated a daily requirement of 3 million gallons of water to serve the needs of a population of 50,000. (This was later increased to 3,250,000 gallons per day.) Weir Wood Reservoir could not meet this on its own; the master plan expected that the River Medway could provide more water directly, and other potential sources were the River Rother and River Ouse. Crawley Development Corporation became a local water authority from 20 November 1948 by order of the Ministry of Health. This allowed it to plan the co-ordination of the New Town's water supply by forming a joint supply company with input from all four water authorities that served the Crawley area at the time. The Weir Wood Joint Water Board was founded in 1950, two years after it was first proposed. In 1952 the Development Corporation built a 250,000-gallon reservoir at Pease Pottage; in the same year the Mid Sussex Joint Water Board started to pump an extra 350,000 gallons per day to Crawley from a reservoir at Ardingly; and a temporary 250,000-gallon reservoir was built at Forest Row to hold surplus water pending improvements to Weir Wood Reservoir. These happened soon afterwards: Weir Wood was extended in 1954 and reopened in 1955. From 1974 Crawley lay on the boundary of two water supply companies; Southern Water and Thames Water supplied water south of and north of the Manor Royal industrial estate respectively.

== Drainage and sewerage ==
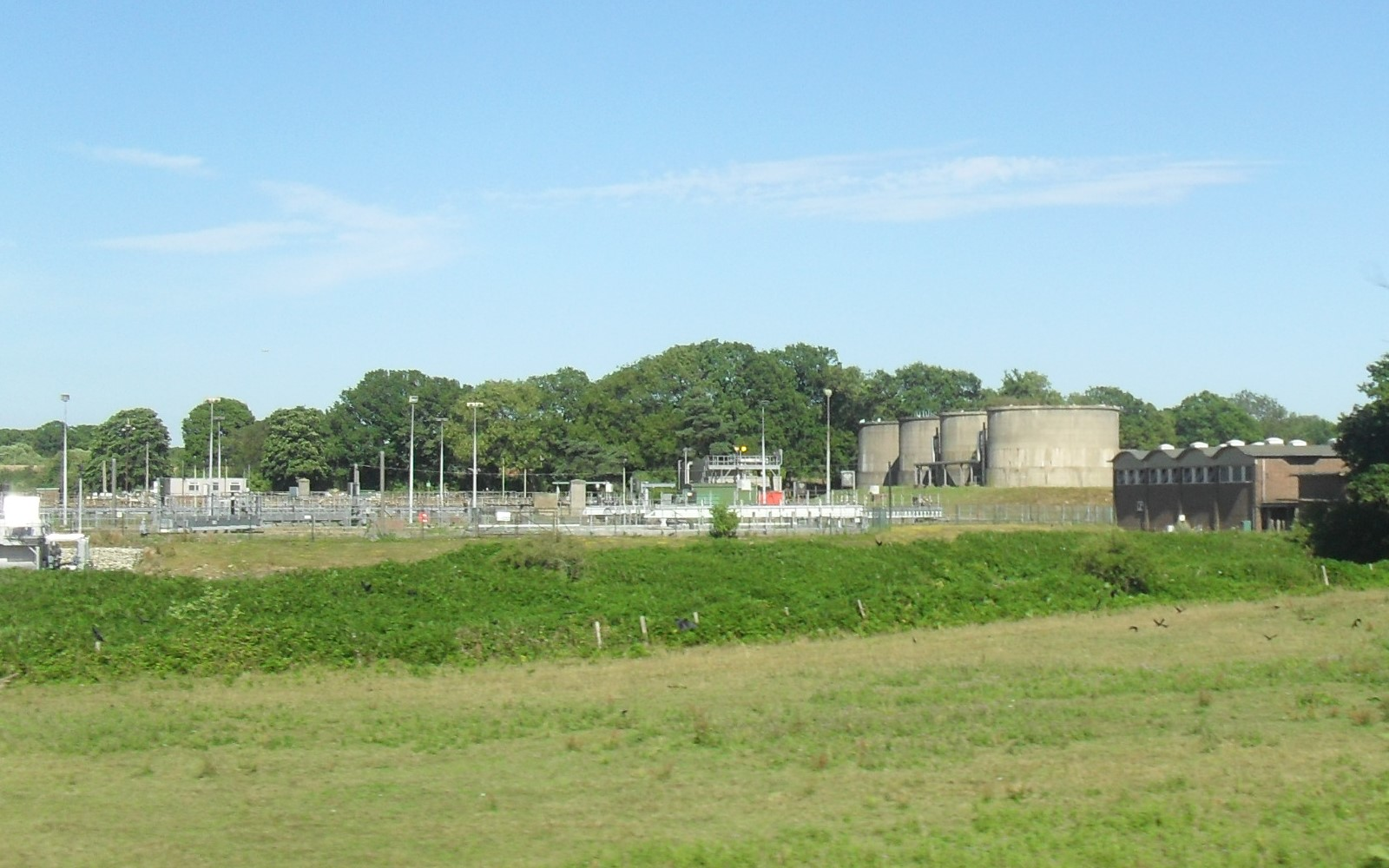
Crawley Sewage Treatment Works

Thames Water owns and operates Crawley Sewage Treatment Works (51.146372°N 0.156663°W), which is the company's largest facility outside London. It discharges into the Gatwick Stream, a tributary of the River Mole. A three-year, £28 million upgrade programme of three Thames Water sewage treatment works, including Crawley, took place between 2010 and 2013. The company stated that upon completion of the work at Crawley, lower concentrations of nitrates would be released into the River Mole, a lower volume of solid waste would need to be removed by road, a higher maximum volume of sewage could be processed, and odour reduction would improve.

Before the New Town was founded, drainage and sewerage provision in the Crawley area was haphazard. The town spread across the border of three parishes, and there was little co-ordination. Cesspits contaminated the wells which many people still used to get their water. Although "a committee of townsfolk" was formed in 1874, it was almost immediately superseded by the Public Health Act 1875 which gave the Board of guardians the authority to carry out drainage work. The whole of Crawley became part of Horsham Union in 1880, making administration easier, but their Board of guardians' drainage scheme of 1884 was opposed by townspeople, and it was several years before the situation was resolved. In about 1907, Horsham Rural District Council built a sewage works at County Oak near Lowfield Heath, just north of Crawley. Sewage from Crawley was piped here in the pre-New Town era and in the early years of the New Town.

Soon after its formation, Crawley Development Corporation bought land at Rolls Farm in Tinsley Green to build the new sewage works. This site was near the original Gatwick Airport railway station. (Note: This was open between 1935 and 1958 and stood on the north side of Radford Road. It was originally named Tinsley Green.) The low-lying land was marshy and poorly drained, but this improved when sewers were built to connect with the River Mole. Thomas Bennett, chairman of the Development Corporation, noted in his 1949 report that the "agreed purity standard" of sewage discharged into the River Mole was "among the best in England". The activated sludge method was used to treat sewage before it was released. The Ministry of Health designated the Development Corporation as the sewerage authority for Crawley on 2 April 1948, and the new sewage works was approved on 30 September 1948. It opened in 1952 and was within the parish of Horley in Surrey before the county boundary was realigned. It was expanded several times in the 1950s as the town grew; originally it was planned to serve 10,000 people, but the master plan proposed 50,000 by the early 1960s and by 1961 the population had already reached 54,000. The County Oak works, now inside the New Town designated area, was turned into a secondary pumping station which took in waste from the western neighbourhoods (Langley Green, Ifield and Gossops Green) and transferred it to the main works at Rolls Farm. Responsibility for the sewerage system passed to Crawley Urban District Council in 1961 and to Thames Water in 1974.

== Cemetery and crematorium ==
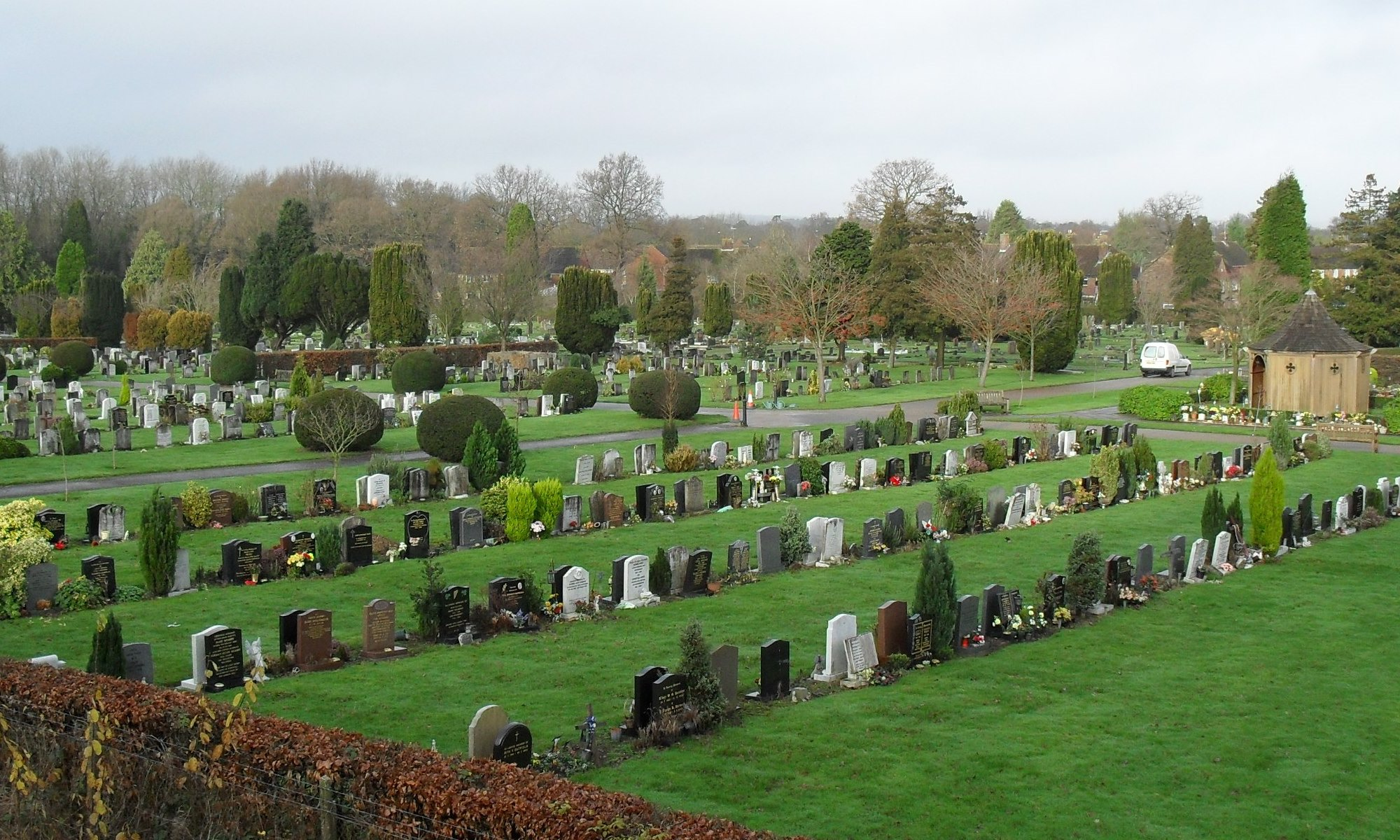
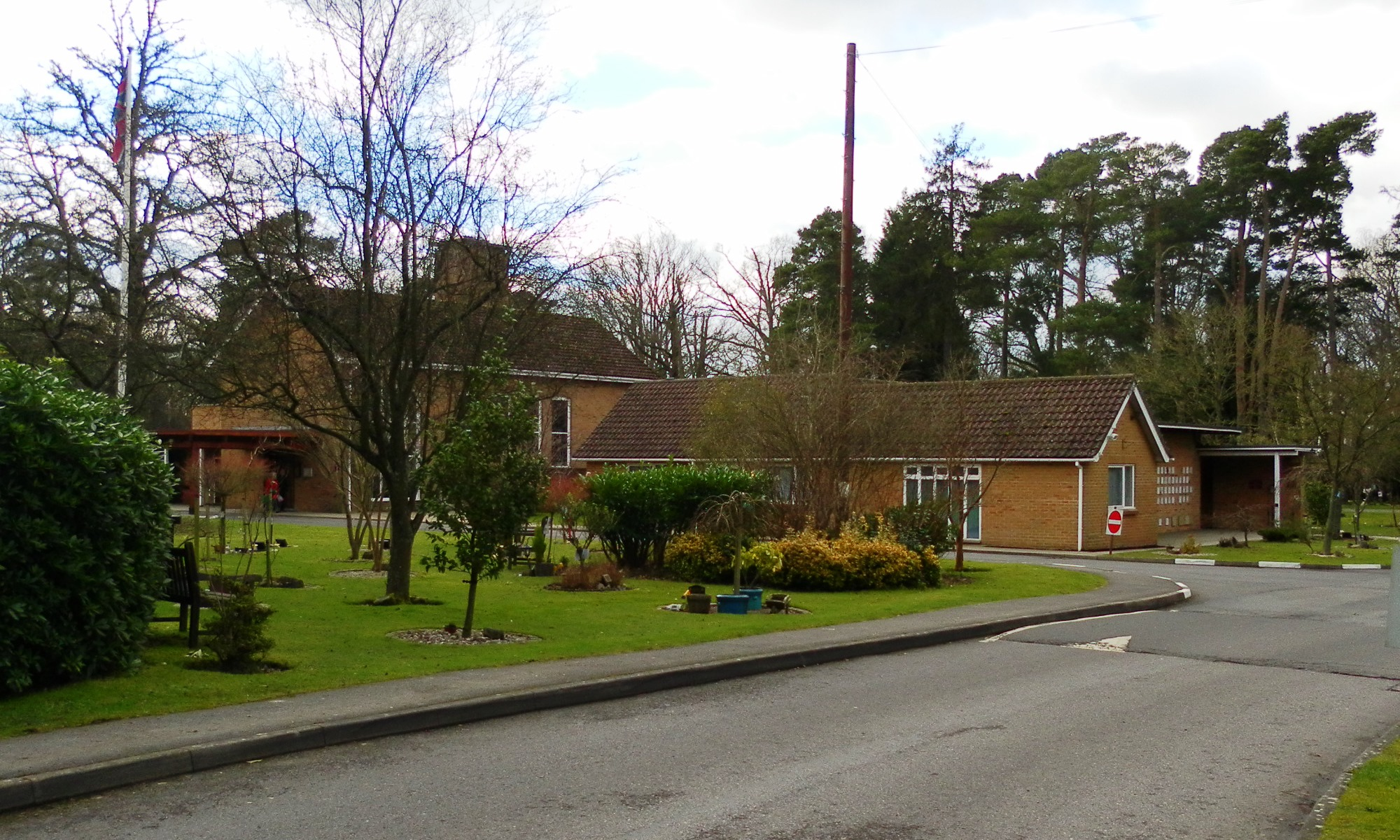
Crawley cemetery (left) and crematorium (right)

Snell Hatch Cemetery (51.115876°N 0.206555°W) is the only cemetery in Crawley. Opened in 1925 and situated in the West Green area, it is open daily and is administered by Crawley Borough Council. Burials can take place on weekdays. All graves are in the form of "lawn graves" with a small headstone. Burial registers since 1925 are held at Crawley Town Hall. The master plan for the New Town set proposed that Snell Hatch Cemetery should still be used, but extra land should be set aside for future use. Land at Broadfield was reserved for a new cemetery, but initially it was not used for this purpose. In December 2014, however, Crawley Borough Council agreed to release 12 acres (4.9 ha) of land to form a new cemetery which was expected to have sufficient capacity for 50 years of burials. The site (51.086519°N 0.204518°W) is off Tollgate Hill in the south of Broadfield. The council-owned land had been used as a Girl Guides campsite, which will be relocated to Tilgate Park. A planning application was lodged in August 2015.

At the time the New Town was designated, cremation was becoming more popular, and an 8-acre (3.2 ha) site was set aside for a crematorium in the middle of Forge Wood (51.135699°N 0.150108°W), between the Balcombe Road and the London–Brighton main railway line in the Pound Hill area. The crematorium opened under private ownership in 1956, by which time 20 acres (8.1 ha) had been obtained; 13 acres (5.3 ha) are laid out as gardens. It is now run by Dignity Funerals Ltd and is known as the Surrey and Sussex Crematorium. The grounds of the crematorium are open every day.
