= Whornes Place, Petersham =

House in Petersham, London

Whornes Place
- Interactive map of the Whornes Place area

General information
- Architectural style: Arts and Crafts
- Location: Petersham, London Borough of Richmond upon Thames, England
- Coordinates: 51.4416°N 0.3029°W
- Completed: 1925

Design and construction
- Architect: Blunden Shadbolt

Listed Building – Grade II
- Official name: 254, PETERSHAM ROAD
- Designated: 7 August 2001
- Reference no.: 1389380

Whornes Place is a house in Petersham, in the London Borough of Richmond upon Thames. It was built in 1925 by Blunden Shadbolt.

The house is in the Arts and Crafts style and has Tudor influences. It includes materials from a similarly named Whornes Place in Cuxton which served as the home of Sir William Whorne. The original house was built in 1487 and pulled down in the 18th century; Shadbolt is said to have attempted to recreate the home as accurately as possible. It has been listed Grade II on the National Heritage List for England since 18 August 2001.

In 2012, it was reported that Brad Pitt and Angelina Jolie had bought the home for $16 million, although this was later proven to be false. They did however briefly live in the home in 2011. Other notable residents include Andrew Loog Oldham, Barry Ryan, and his wife Princess Miriam of Johore.
