= Fernhill, West Sussex =

Hamlet in West Sussex, UK

Coordinates: 51.155°N 0.139°W

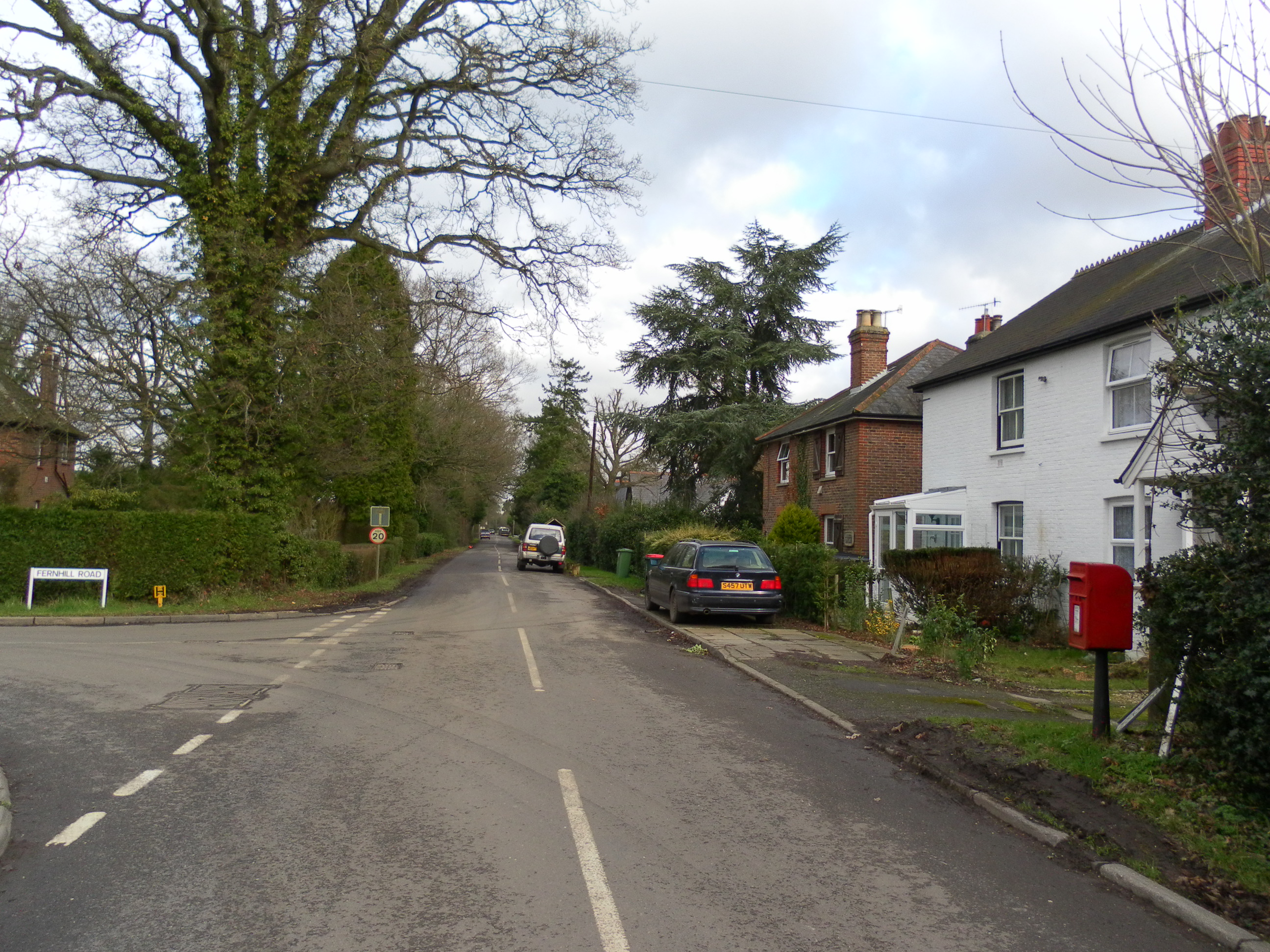
The junction of Peeks Brook Lane and Fernhill Road in Fernhill

Fernhill is a hamlet close to Gatwick Airport in West Sussex, England. Its fields and farmhouses formerly straddled the county boundary between Surrey and West Sussex, but since 1990 (when there were about 60 households) the whole area has been part of the county of West Sussex and the borough of Crawley. Fernhill is bounded on three sides by motorways and the airport. A fatal aeroplane crash occurred here in 1969.

== Location ==
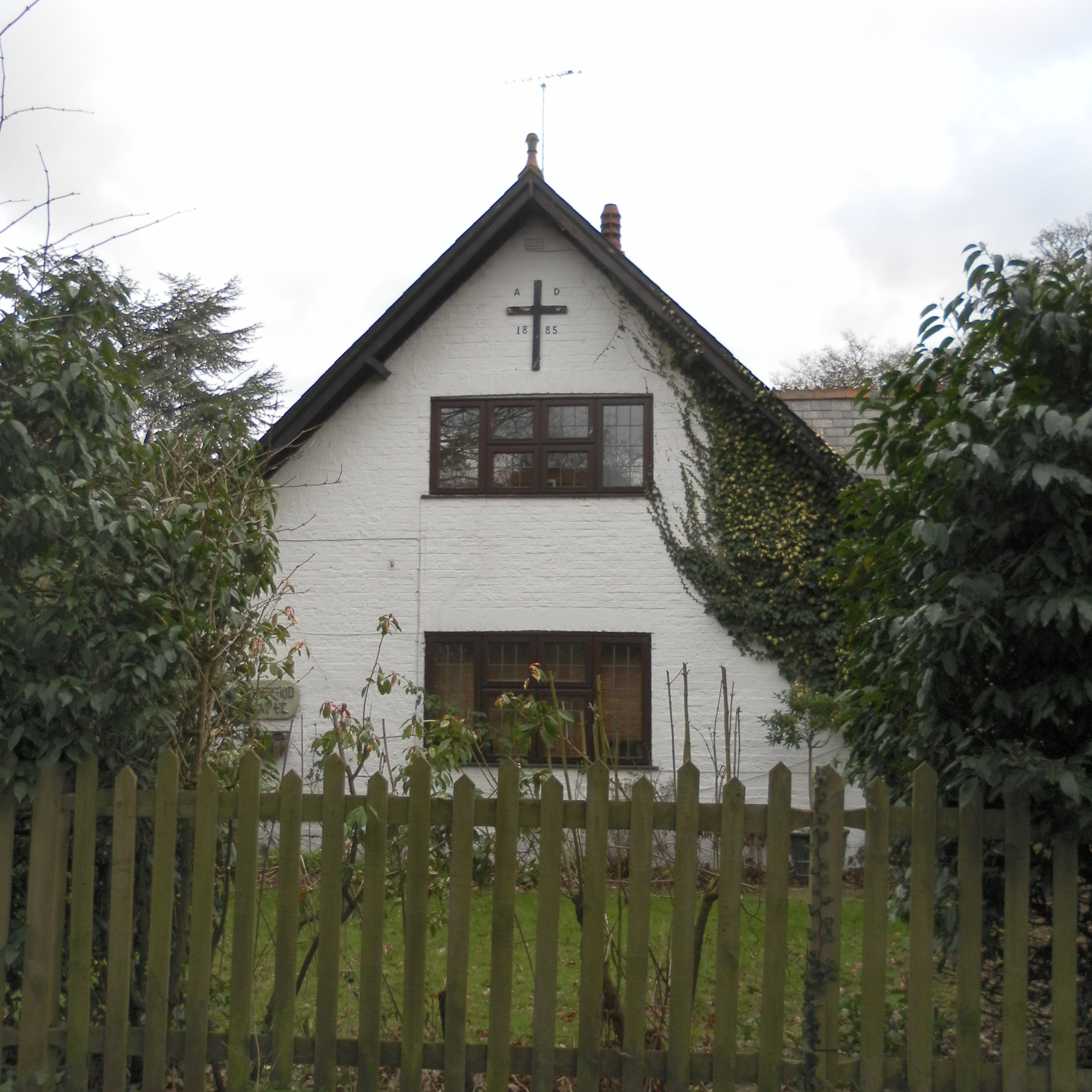
Fernhill's former Baptist chapel is now a house.

Fernhill is in the far northeast corner of the borough of Crawley and the far north of the county of West Sussex. The borough and county boundaries run along the M23 motorway, which lies to the north and east. To the west, Balcombe Road (part of the B2036 Horley–Burgess Hill road) separates Fernhill from Gatwick Airport. Antlands Lane (part of the B2037 to East Grinstead) leads from Tinsley Green to Shipley Bridge and Burstow, forming the southern boundary. Peeks Brook Lane runs south–north through the area, and Fernhill Road (formerly Fernhill Lane) runs west–east and connects it to Balcombe Road. Gatwick Airport is 1 1/2 miles (2.4 km) to the west, and the town of Horley is the same distance north.

Fernhill was originally a hamlet in the parish of Burstow in southwest Surrey. Its Baptist chapel was recorded in 1911 as one of two in the parish. In 1990, the Local Government Boundary Commission for England undertook a review of the boundaries of Surrey and West Sussex as part of a study of the boundaries of non-metropolitan counties. It received a suggestion from Crawley Borough Council that Fernhill should move into the borough because it "shared a community of interest with [Crawley]" and was cut off from the rest of Surrey by the M23 motorway. At the time, the hamlet was part of Burstow parish, Tandridge District and the county of Surrey; all objected to the proposal, and West Sussex County Council offered no opinion. The Commission agreed with Crawley Borough Council's view that Fernhill's isolation from Surrey meant that "effective and convenient local government" would be better achieved by transferring it to West Sussex. When the proposal was formalised, further objections were raised. Several roads led eastwards beyond the motorway, so isolation was said not be a significant factor; Fernhill would no longer have a parish council to represent it, as Crawley had none; the policing of part of the motorway might be affected; residents were said to wish to remain in Surrey; a transfer to Crawley could encourage expansion of the hamlet; and "close ties" to Burstow and Horley would be affected. The Commission decided that Crawley Borough Council's argument that Fernhill sat most appropriately within Crawley for the purposes of planning and services, and the fact that none of the residents who would be moved made any comment about the plans, overrode the objections, and the boundary was accordingly moved eastwards beyond the motorway to take in the whole area.

== Transport ==
The nearest railway stations are Gatwick Airport and Horley. Metrobus routes 526 and 527 run hourly in each direction on weekdays and every 90 minutes on Saturdays, providing a service to Tinsley Green, Three Bridges, Crawley town centre, Crawley Hospital, Ifield, Charlwood, Horley, Smallfield and Burstow.

== Heritage ==
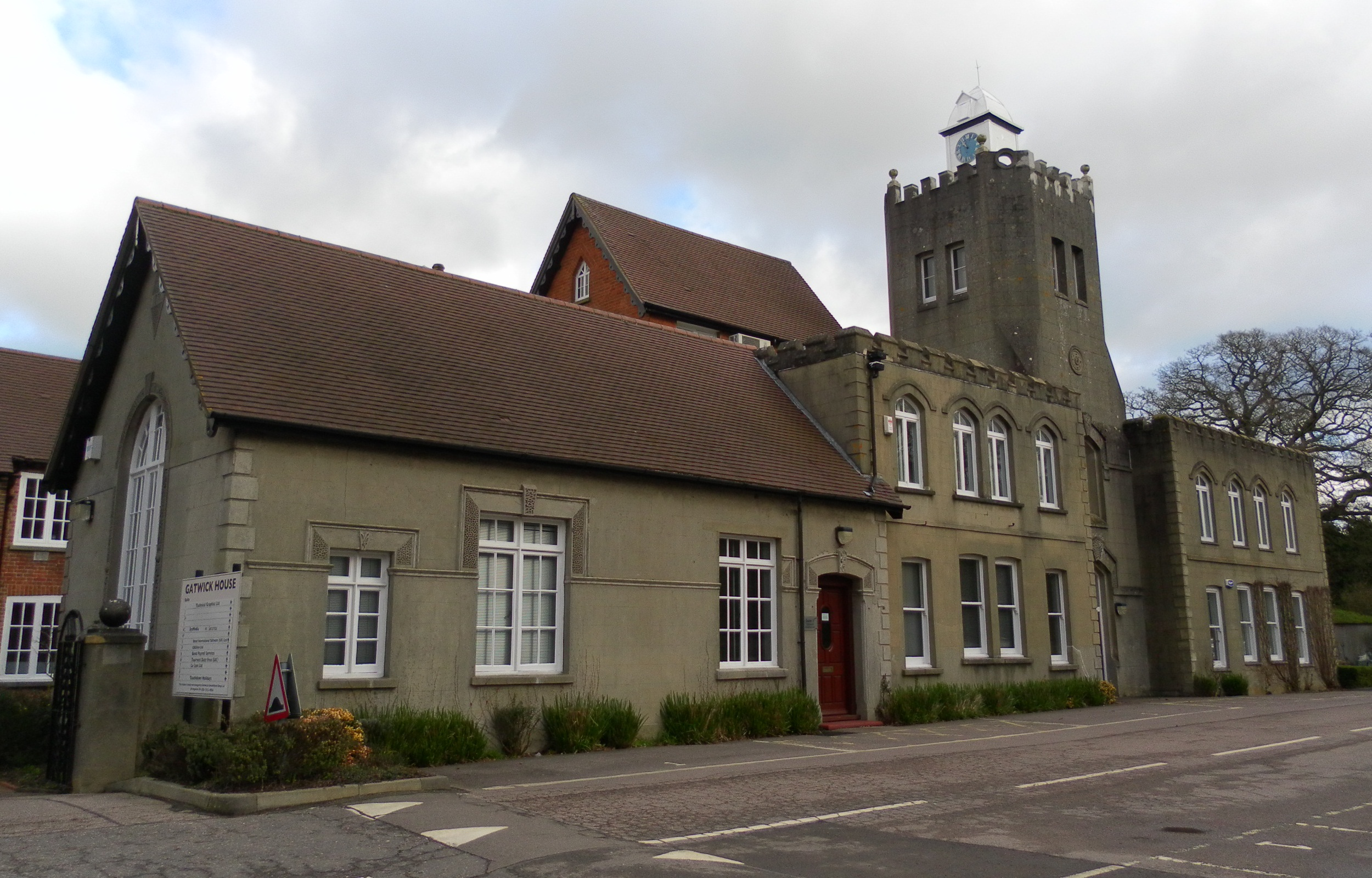
Gatwick House (1876) has been converted from a country house into offices.

There are four listed buildings in Fernhill, and a further six have been given locally listed status by Crawley Borough Council. Just west of the Balcombe Road, and now within the boundary of Gatwick Airport, are two surviving medieval buildings: Edgeworth House and Wing House. They are attached to each other at right-angles but are of different dates: Edgeworth House (a four-bay timber-framed hall house) is 15th- or early 16th-century, while Wing House dates from the mid-16th century. It has Charlwood and Horsham stonework, brick, timber framing and a tiled roof. On Donkey Lane, which leads north from Fernhill Road and becomes a footpath, Lilac Cottage and Old Cottage are listed. Lilac Cottage is partly tile-hung and retains its original (18th-century) chimneys, inglenook fireplace and timber framing. Old Cottage is a similar but older (17th- or early-18th-century) house: it has brickwork, timber framing and exterior tiles on the upper storey.

Of the locally listed buildings, Burstow Hall is a mid-19th-century mansion of stone and brick (including some multicoloured glazed brickwork); Gatwick House is a large block of serviced offices which was built in 1876 as a country house and which combines the Gothic Revival and Neo-Georgian styles; Poplars is a slightly altered three-bay house of the mid-19th century; Number 1 Pullcotts Farm Cottages has ground-floor brickwork in various colours, tile-hanging above and old sash windows; Royal Oak House is a large stuccoed villa of the 1880s; and Touchwood Chapel is the hamlet's former Baptist chapel, built in 1885 and now in residential use.

== 1969 air crash ==
On 5 January 1969, a Boeing 727 airliner operated by Ariana Afghan Airlines crashed in Fernhill, killing 50 people. It came down in heavy, freezing fog on its approach to Gatwick Airport on a flight from Kabul International Airport in Afghanistan. There were 48 fatalities on the aircraft, and two Fernhill residents were killed when it crashed into and destroyed their house, Longfield, on the south side of Fernhill Road. A baby also in the house at the time survived.
