= Pound Hill =

Area of Crawley, West Sussex, England

Coordinates: 51.1220°N 0.1486°W

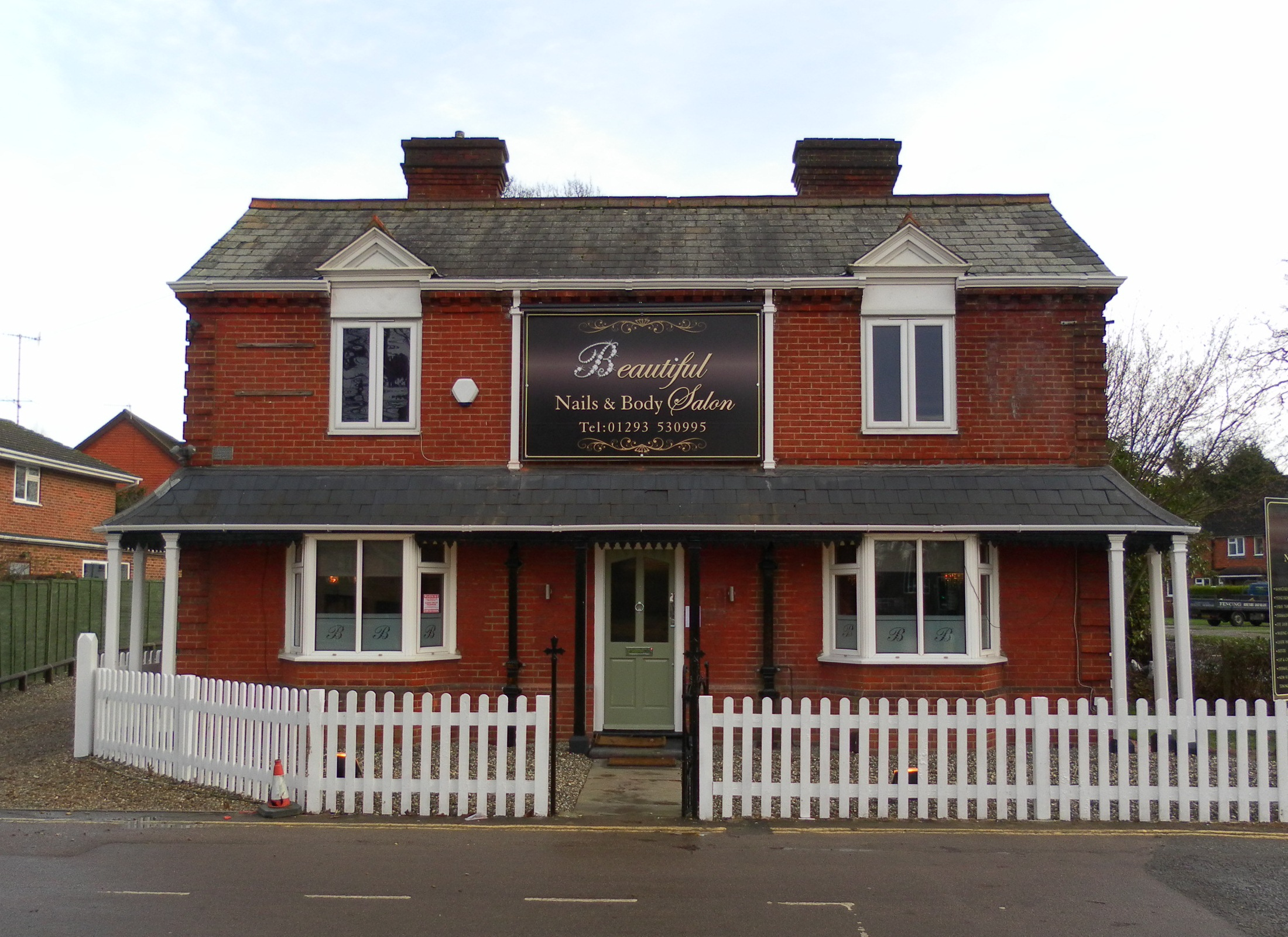
- Worth Park Lodge, Pound Hill

- Location within West Sussex
- Population: 14,700 (2001 data)
- OS grid reference: TQ295375
- District: Crawley
- Shire county: West Sussex
- Region: South East
- Country: England
- Sovereign state: United Kingdom
- Post town: Crawley
- Postcode district: RH10
- Dialling code: 01293
- Police: Sussex
- Fire: West Sussex
- Ambulance: South East Coast
- UK Parliament: Crawley

Pound Hill is one of 14 neighbourhoods within the town of Crawley in West Sussex, England. Pound Hill is located on the east of Crawley. It is bordered by Three Bridges and Manor Royal to the west and Maidenbower to the south.

It is the largest of the 13 neighbourhoods of Crawley. Until 2004, it was the first one to be split into two wards - Pound Hill North and Pound Hill South. Its boundaries extend north beyond the main built-up area thus making it also the most northerly neighbourhood in the town.

== History ==
Pound Hill was originally a hamlet within the parish of Worth. In 1809 an Act of Parliament created a turnpike between Horley and Balcombe, this road (now called the Balcombe Road) entered the parish from the North and at the top of Pound Hill it turned east and followed the Crawley to Turners Hill road, after a few hundred yards the road then turned south along Church Lane in Worth. The houses and farms around the Pound Hill junction became known as Pound Hill. Due to the close proximity of Worth Church, Pound Hill did not develop into a village. The turnpike was busy and the hill leading down Church Lane became difficult for wheeled vehicles. Church Lane was bypassed when a new road was made directly south from Pound Hill junction to join the old road at the bottom of the hill near Frogshole Farm. A public house the Kings Head became a popular stopping place for coaches between London and Brighton. But by the 1830s the Kings Head had become a private house and most of the coaches used the new turnpike through Crawley.

By 1916 a telephone exchange had been built in Pound Hill.

In the 1920s and 1930s a number of large estates in the area were sold and land became available for development. In Pound Hill 102 houses were built along St Mary's Drive. Although further land was cleared the development in the area was stopped by the Second World War. Post-war further houses were built around St Mary's Drive.

With the creation of Crawley New Town in 1947 the Pound Hill area was proposed as a neighbourhood. It not only included the original area of Pound Hill but all the land between the London-Brighton railway and the Balcombe Road, and south from Crawley Avenue to the Three Bridges-East Grinstead Railway. And later it included the area around Worth church. Work began and building new houses around 1953 and the southern part of Pound Hill was completed in 1956. Development of the northern part continued into the 1970s. Also in the 1970s the area to the east between the Balcombe Road and the M23 motorway was developed and other areas were infilled. In 1981 Pound Hill had 11,617 inhabitants. A school in the area collapsed under the weight of a severe storm that hit Britain on 25 January 1990, but all pupils had been evacuated just minutes before the building collapsed.

== Today ==
Pound Hill has a wide variety of housing from small flats to very large modern houses.

The area of Worth is within the boundaries of Pound Hill; this was official recognition with the renaming of 'Pound Hill South' in 2004 to 'Pound Hill South and Worth'. It is common for signposts to be altered to use the Worth name by local residents.

=== Leisure ===
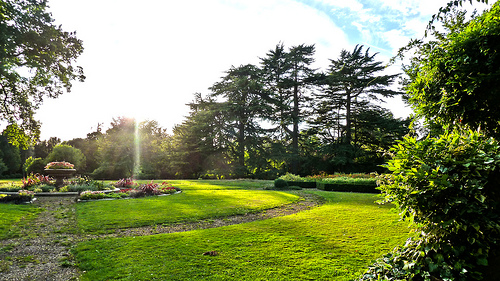
Worth Park

Worth Park Gardens is a large recreational parkland located within Pound Hill and dates back to 1882. It hosts several listed buildings and is the home of The Crawley Croquet Club.

=== Music ===
Pound Hill was formerly the home of Robert Smith of rock band The Cure.
