= Blunden Shadbolt =

British architect

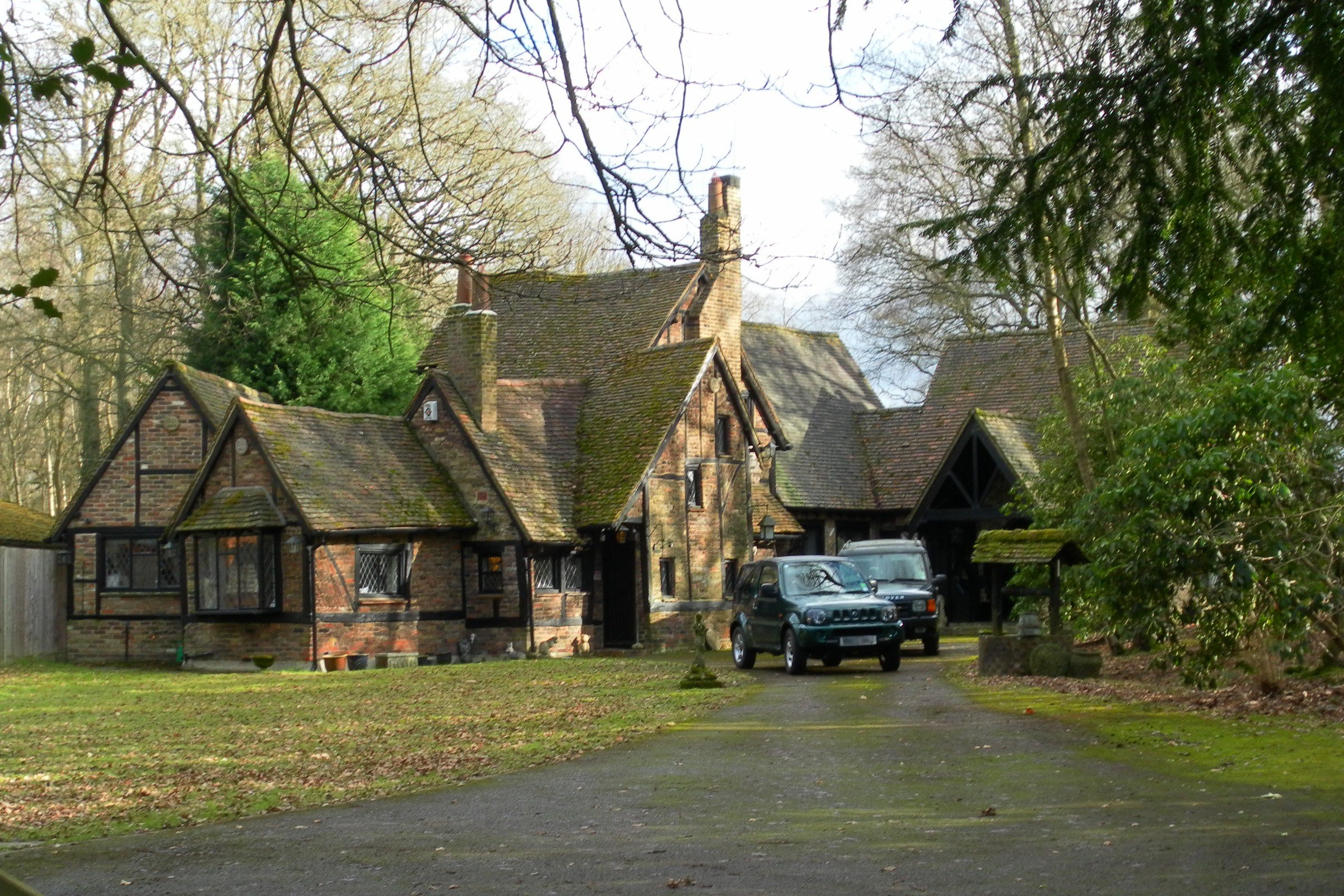
A Blunden Shadbolt designed house in Tinsley Green, Crawley.

Blunden Shadbolt (1879–1949) was a British architect who specialised in houses in the neo-Tudor and Arts and Crafts style.
