= Worth Park Gardens =

Park in Crawley, West Sussex, England

Coordinates: 51.1274°N 0.1502°W

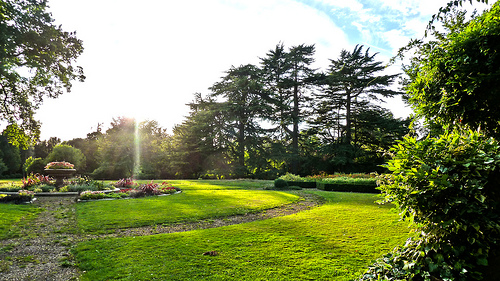

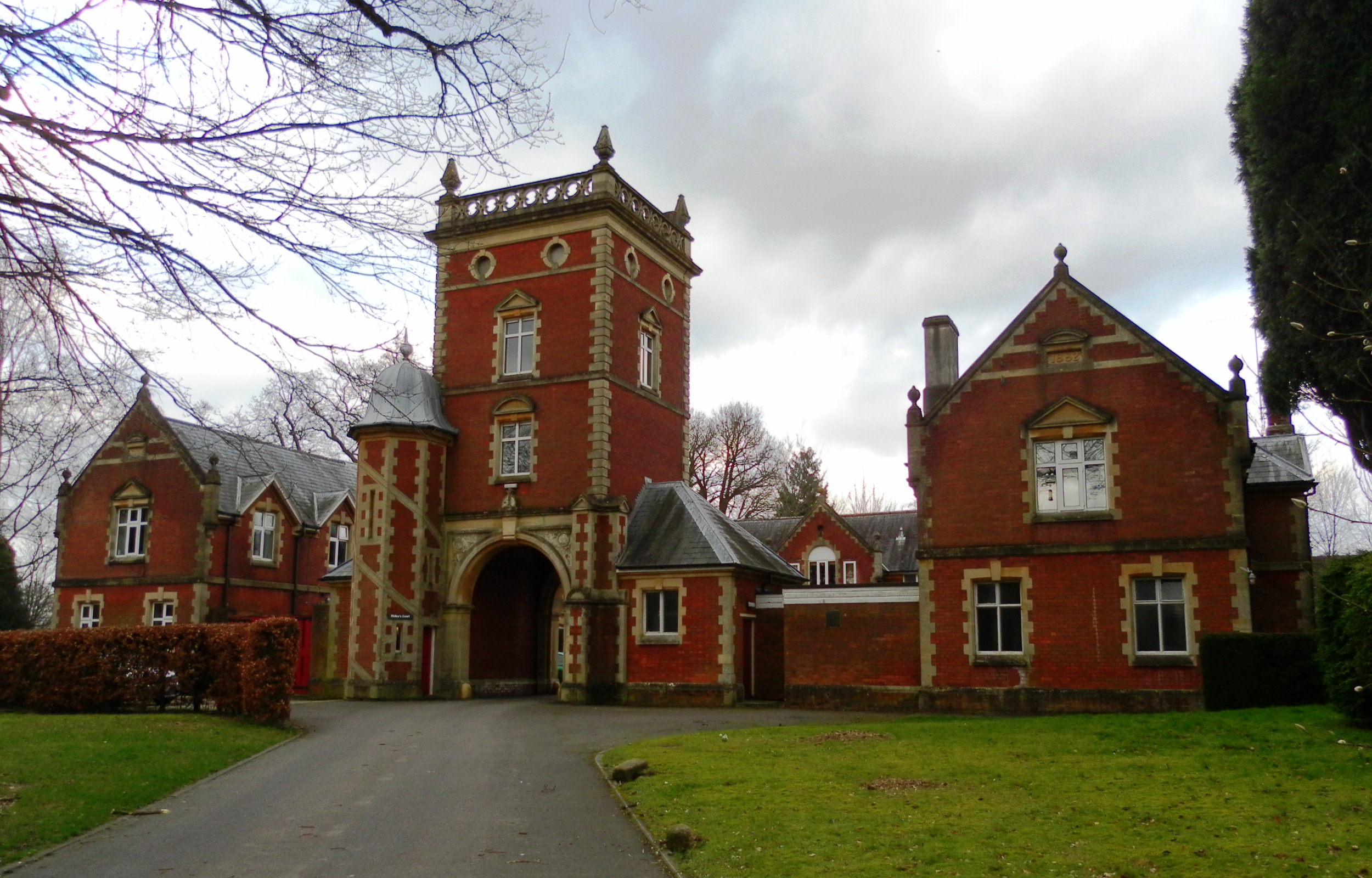
Ridley's Court

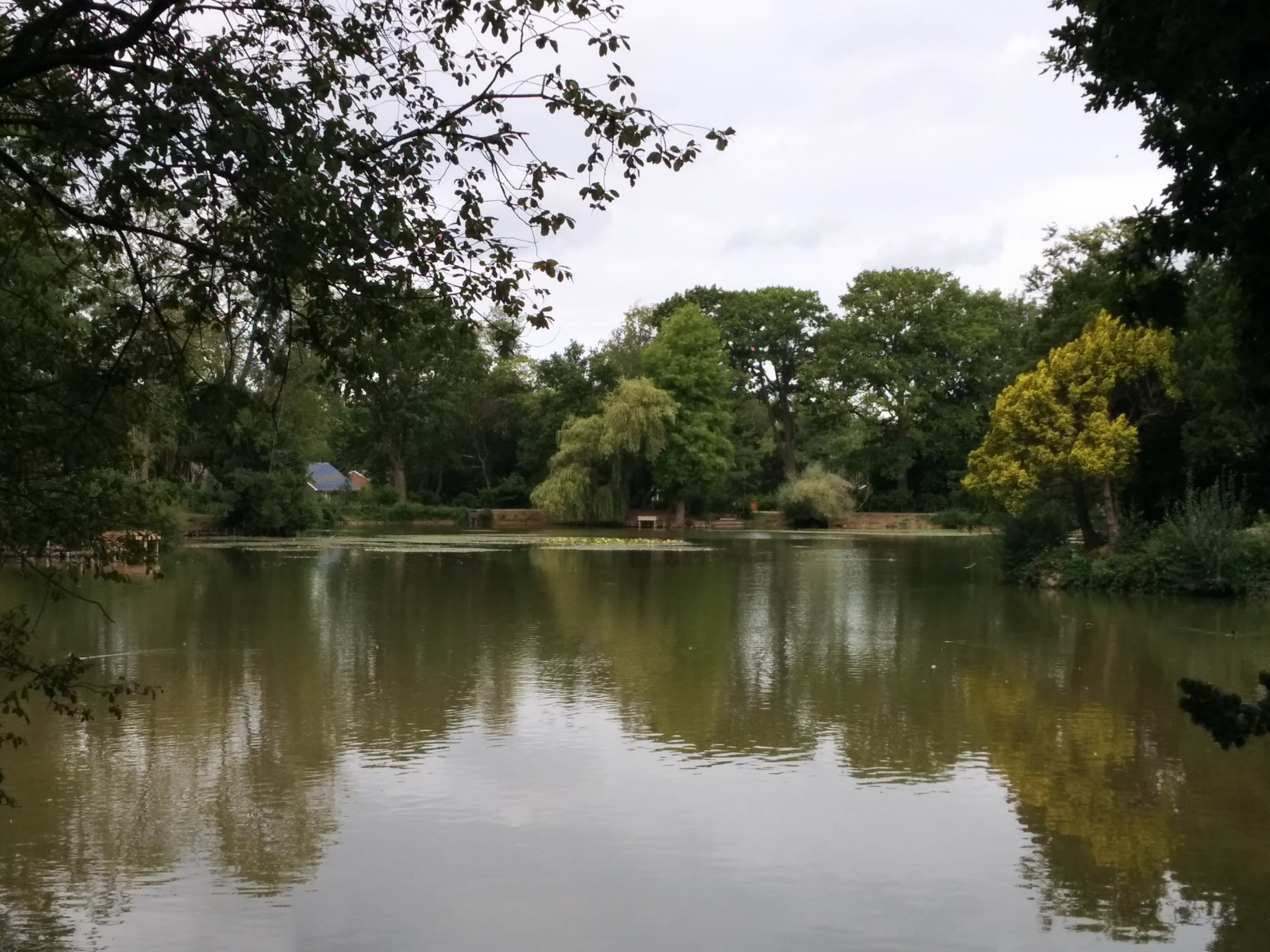
The lake

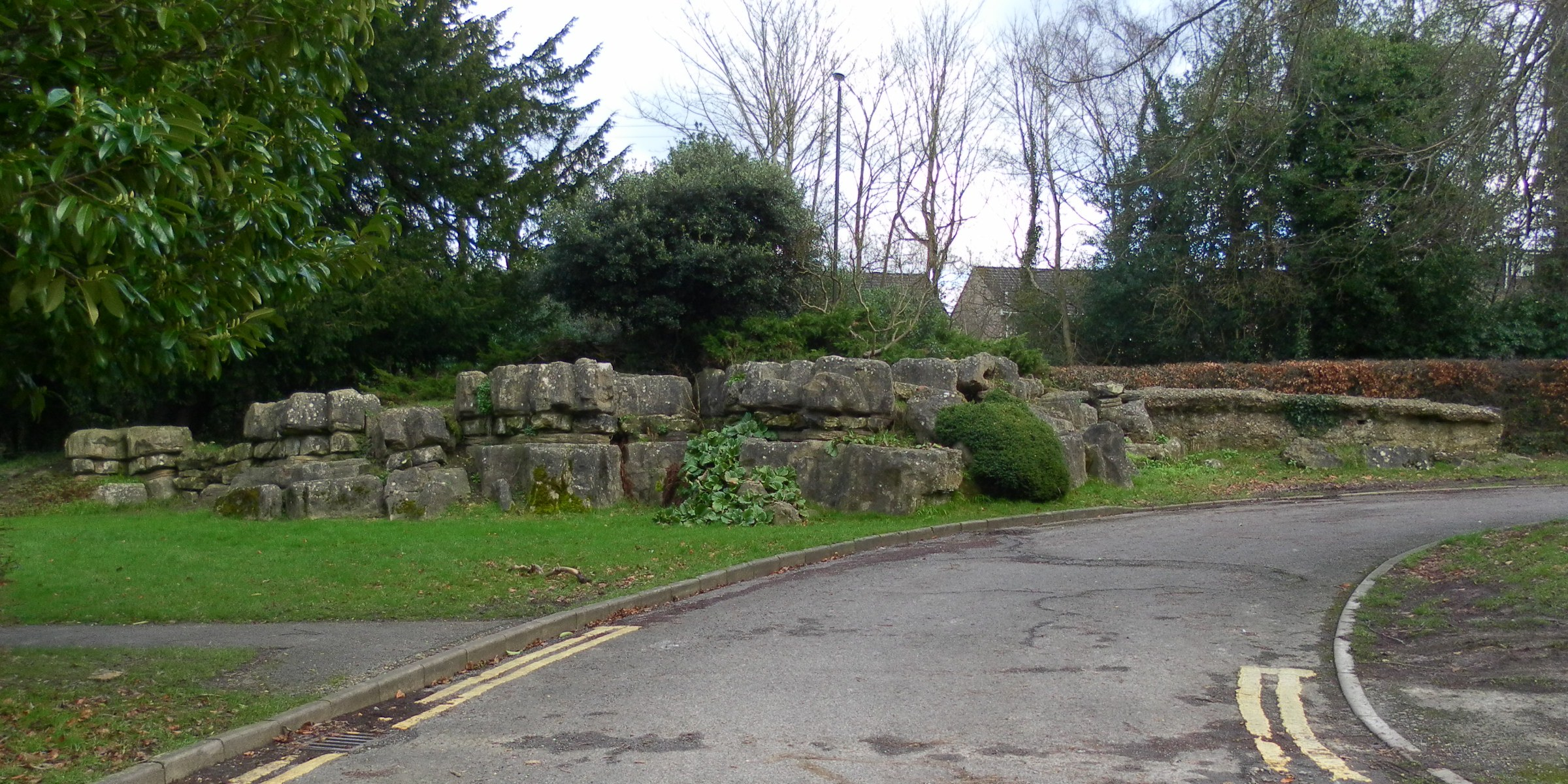
Pulhamite rock garden

Worth Park (formerly known as Milton Mount Gardens) is in Pound Hill, Crawley. The park covers eight hectares and includes formal gardens, and a lake area.

Some of the trees in the park today may exist from the original 1840s planting and include several varieties of oak and an avenue of cedars.

The park is mainly enclosed by a perimeter belt of trees with an informal network of paths. The paths encircle the formal pond area and the croquet lawn leading to the tennis court. A path crosses a ha-ha and leads to a circular walk around the informal lake at the northwest corner of the park. A significant amount of the original Worth Park garden still exists from the early 1900s but is now in need of substantial restoration.

The area around the lake obtained status as a Site of Nature Conservation Importance in 1992 and is habitat to a large variety of fauna and several rare plants.

Ridley's Court in Worth Park which dates back to 1882 has been Grade II listed. The stables to Worth Park in Milton Mount Avenue, were designated with the listing by Andy Burnham, Secretary of State for Culture, Media and Sport on 27 February 2008. Two Pulhamite rock structure and the fountain and pond basin have also been listed.

== History ==
The park was originally a medieval deer park and formed part of the Forest of Worth stretching from Slaugham in the South to Worth in the North. The Worth Park Estate was purchased by Sir Joseph Montefiore in 1850. Joseph died in 1880 and the house and garden was remodelled by his son Francis Abraham Montefiore.

The gardens were laid out over four levels to utilise the elevated position of the site. The first level was a formal garden consisting of three circular areas known as Fountain, Dutch and Sundial. The second level consisted of formal terraces with a staircase, a formal pond surrounded by ball shaped yews. The third area was open parkland and the final area a lake complete with Pulhamite rock features.

== Crawley Croquet Club ==
The Crawley Croquet Club formed 31 years ago play on the croquet pitch located inside the grounds of Worth Park gardens. The Club has two full size lawns which are sometimes split into four half size lawns and a smaller practice one.
