= Listed buildings in Crawley =

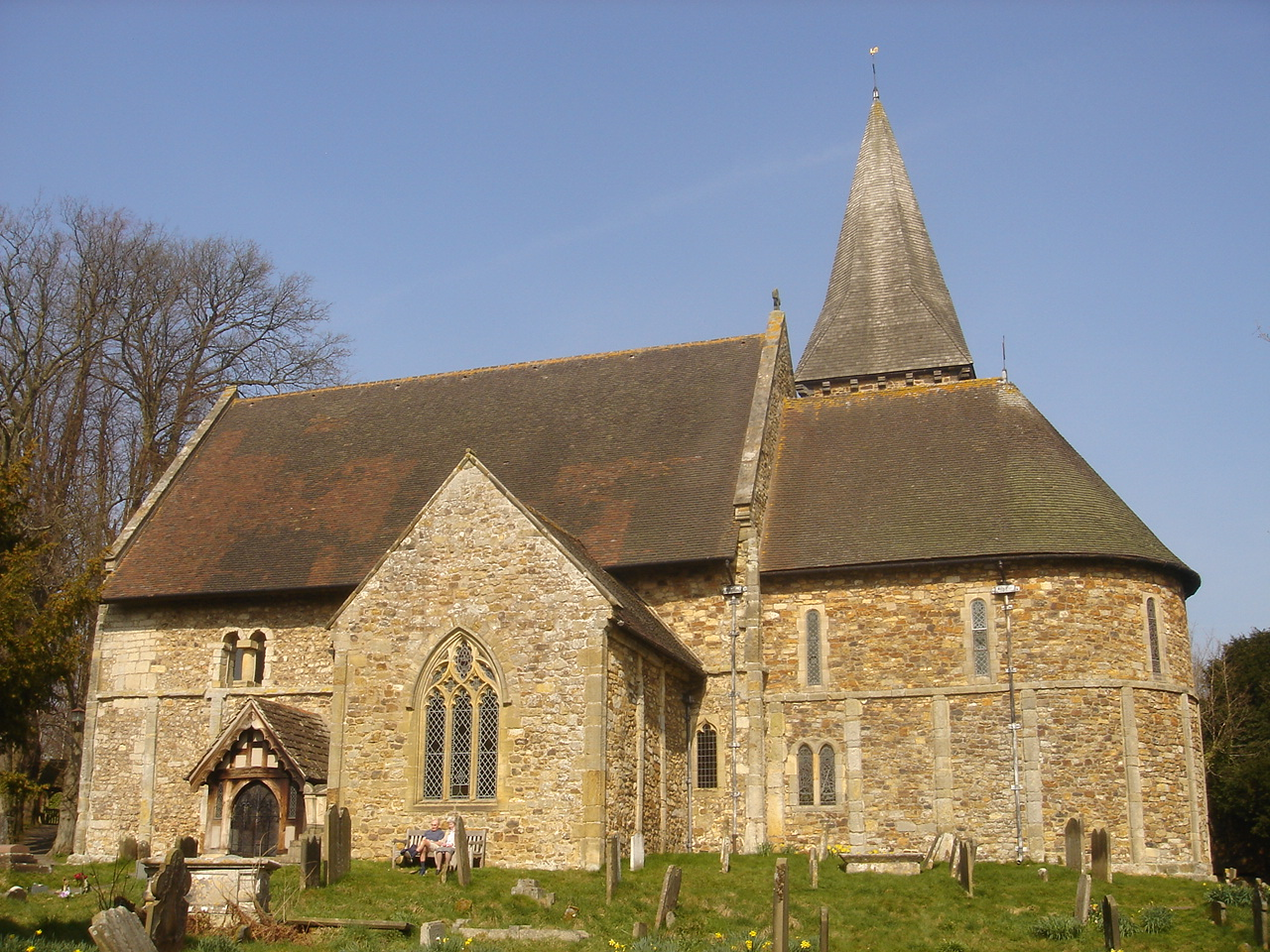
St Nicholas' Church, the ancient parish church of Worth, has Saxon origins.

As of 2011 there were 102 listed buildings and structures in the English borough of Crawley, West Sussex. Two others have subsequently gained listed status. The Borough of Crawley is based on the town of the same name, located approximately halfway between London and Brighton. Although Crawley expanded substantially after World War II when it was designated a New Town by an Act of Parliament, many older buildings remain.

In England, a building or structure is defined as "listed" when it is placed on a statutory register of buildings of "special architectural or historic interest" by the Secretary of State for Culture, Media and Sport, a Government department, in accordance with the Planning (Listed Buildings and Conservation Areas) Act 1990. Historic England, a non-departmental public body, acts as an agency of this department to administer the process and advise the department on relevant issues. There are three grades of listing status: Grade I, defined as being of "exceptional interest"; Grade II*, "particularly important buildings of more than special interest"; and Grade II, used for buildings of "special interest".

Crawley has three buildings of Grade I status, 12 listed at Grade II* and 87 of Grade II status. The three Grade I buildings are all places of worship, and churches and farmhouses feature frequently in the list. Other structures given recognition by English Heritage include a signal box, a watermill, and the Beehive—a "revolutionary" purpose-built circular building which was the original passenger terminal at Gatwick Airport and the world's first fully integrated airport terminal.

The design of the New Town was based on a series of self-contained residential neighbourhoods around a town centre with commercial and civic buildings. There are now 13 neighbourhoods in the town. Pound Hill and Ifield, old villages absorbed by the postwar development, have 28 and 24 listed buildings respectively. Northgate, which has 18, includes much of the town centre and the old High Street. Langley Green, in which there are 15 listed buildings, is the largest neighbourhood with a large semi-rural hinterland. Elsewhere, there are six listed buildings in West Green, two each in Bewbush and Southgate, and one in each of Broadfield, Gossops Green, Maidenbower, Three Bridges and Tilgate. Furnace Green is the only neighbourhood with no listed buildings.

Crawley Borough Council maintains a list of all listed buildings. Last updated in 2011, some of its information supersedes the older information carried by English Heritage's online archive, Images of England, which was compiled in February 2001 and which identifies 95 listed buildings in the borough. An early-19th-century house called Charlwood Park, listed at Grade II on 11 November 1966, was originally within the parish of Charlwood in the county of Surrey. The Local Government Act 1972, which moved parts of Surrey (including Lowfield Heath and Gatwick Airport) from Surrey into West Sussex, also moved this house into West Sussex and the Borough of Crawley. It was subsequently demolished, but is still shown in the Images of England archive. Buildings listed since the council's last update are Lowfield Hall, a house at Lowfield Heath, and the war memorial in the nearby church.

== Listed buildings ==
Name	Image	Area/ Coordinates	Grade	Notes	Refs
Friends Meeting House		Langley Green; 51.1267°N 0.2117°W	I	A Quaker community was established in Ifield in the mid-17th century, and by 1676—when the meeting house was built—more than a quarter of residents were Nonconformist Christians. It has been used continuously for worship since then, and is one of the oldest purpose-built Quaker meeting houses in existence. The twin-gabled building is of Sussex stone and has a simple 18th-century interior.	
St Margaret's Church		Ifield; 51.1239°N 0.2194°W	I	When built in the 13th century on the site of a 10th-century church, St Margaret's was at the centre of a large parish with a scattered population. Ifield itself was merely a hamlet clustered around the church. The oldest surviving part is one end of the chancel. The building experienced renovations and reordering in the Victorian era.	
St Nicholas' Church		Worth; 51.1103°N 0.1417°W	I	The church is of Saxon origin—probably 10th-century—and is unusually tall and wide for a church of that era. Worth was originally a Wealden village with its own parish, but boundary changes brought the church and part of the parish within the Borough of Crawley. Some structural changes were made in the 13th century, and restoration work took place in 1871 and after a fire in 1986.	
5 Langley Lane		Langley Green; 51.1268°N 0.2117°W	II*	This two-storey timber-framed hall house was built in around 1475; the brick and tile facings are 18th-century. The Friends Meeting House was built on its eastern side in 1676 when the cottage's owner donated land to the Quaker community.	
Ancient Priors		Northgate; 51.1139°N 0.1903°W	II*	This timber-framed hall-house was built around 1450, partly on the site of an older building which was then integrated with it. The four-bay building was restored from a near-derelict state in the 1930s, and was owned by champion boxer Alan Minter in the late 20th century.	
Charlwood House		Lowfield Heath; 51.1440°N 0.1955°W	II*	The core of this large building, now a nursery school, is an early-17th-century timber-framed house with jettying at one end and a tile-hung upper storey. The tiled roof uses Horsham stone. An extension was built in the same style in the 20th century.	
Charlwood Park Farmhouse		Lowfield Heath; 51.1597°N 0.1971°W	II*	On the Surrey border and now just outside the perimeter of Gatwick Airport, this 15th-century open hall-house was altered in the 17th century. The ground floor has timber framing, the first floor is tile-hung, and the gabled roof is tiled and has a 17th-century chimney. The building is jettied all around.	
Ewhurst Place		Ifield; 51.1232°N 0.2029°W	II*	In the Crawley area there were originally six timber-framed houses surrounded by moats; Ewhurst Place, built in the late 16th century on a much older site, is the only example where both the house and the complete moat remain. The walls are variously tile-hung, brick-faced or timber-framed. Horsham stone tiles are used on the roof, which is hipped at two ends. The name Ewhurst ("Yew Wood") is one of the area's oldest farm names.	
Hyders Hall (Gatwick Manor Inn)		Lowfield Heath; 51.1393°N 0.1843°W	II*	Like Ewhurst Place, this was a timber-framed building on a moated site; only part of the moat remains. Originally built in the 15th century as an open hall-house, it experienced several alterations in later centuries: new floors, chimneys, cross-beamed ceilings, windows and a staircase were added. The building now houses a restaurant, bar and conference facilities.	
Old Punch Bowl		Northgate; 51.1161°N 0.1894°W	II*	This late-15th-century timber-framed hall house has performed many roles in Crawley's history, from its early use as a farmhouse to its 20th-century commercial uses: a tearoom, a bank and now a public house. There are five bays, all of which are jettied, and a large chimney at the north end.	
Rowley Farmhouse		Lowfield Heath; 51.1417°N 0.1725°W	II*	Based on a small deposit of gravel, offering good drainage in an area of heavy clay, this farmhouse dates from the 15th or 16th century and was built as a five-bay timber-framed smoke bay house (a later version of the open hall-house). A chimney was added in the 18th century. A fatal aeroplane crash occurred here in 1936.	
St John the Baptist's Church		Northgate; 51.1139°N 0.1886°W	II*	Crawley's parish church dates from the 13th century, and some original parts remain; but many alterations have been made over the centuries, including the rebuilt tower of 1807.	
St Michael and All Angels Church		Lowfield Heath; 51.1458°N 0.1797°W	II*	William Burges built this yellow sandstone French Gothic-style church in 1867 as the Anglican parish church of the (now depopulated) village of Lowfield Heath. Since 1974, it has been in the Borough of Crawley within the Langley Green neighbourhood, and is now used by a Seventh-day Adventist Church congregation.	
The Beehive		Gatwick Airport; 51.1443°N 0.1634°W	II*	Frank Hoar designed this revolutionary circular building—the first fully integrated airport terminal in the world—in 1934. It was completed by 1936, and is now used as offices.	
The George Hotel		West Green; 51.1148°N 0.1907°W	II*	Commemorated in paintings and fiction, visited by monarchs and used as a venue for public executions, this coaching inn has existed since the 15th century and has expanded to take in adjacent buildings. Its popularity was greatest during the 18th and 19th centuries, when it developed its reputation as Crawley's most famous and important building. Its core is a timber-framed hall-house of the mid-15th century.	
10 Ifield Road		West Green; 51.1144°N 0.1918°W	II	A 19th-century reconstruction obscures a timber-framed cottage two centuries older. Stretcher bond brickwork and tiles are visible on the outside, and the roof is half-hipped. The house was used as a bakery for many years and is currently being restored for use as a private dwelling.	
29 High Street		Northgate; 51.1137°N 0.1903°W	II	This has been converted into a shop and altered internally, but consists of a house of about 1620 with exposed chamfered timbers and a 19th-century corn-dealer's yard with a barn, storeroom, stables and shed. The house had a chimney, which has been removed, but the internal chimney bay remains.	
34–36 High Street		West Green; 51.1141°N 0.1908°W	II	This two-storey, red-brick, late-18th-century building (Crawley town centre's only survivor from this era) has been converted into two shops with residential accommodation above. The tiled roof has two original chimneys, and there are six old sash windows on the upper floor.	
37 Langley Lane		Langley Green; 51.1280°N 0.2081°W	II	This is the main building on the Apple Tree Farm site, which is being redeveloped with housing and a Hindu temple. The 17th-century timber-framed farmhouse, with a tiled roof, was extended and faced in brick in the mid-19th century.	
39 High Street		Northgate; 51.1141°N 0.1902°W	II	This building on the path leading to St John the Baptist's Church now presents a Gothic appearance, but was originally a timber-framed hall-house built in the 16th century. The remodelling was done in the mid-19th century. It is now partly tile-hung and has a steeply pitched tiled roof with decorative bargeboards on its gables.	
39 Langley Lane		Langley Green; 51.1290°N 0.2084°W	II	This small cottage was built no later than the mid-18th century, although there is a modern section constructed of similar materials. It stands off Langley Lane on land belonging to Apple Tree Farm, and is now surrounded by new houses. The partly timber-framed building is tile-hung on the upper floor. A large chimney stack stands at the west end.	
44–48 High Street		West Green; 51.1144°N 0.1907°W	II	Now divided into three shops, this was built in around 1600 as a four-bay timber-framed hall-house. It was converted into shops by the 19th century, when it received a stucco exterior and four sash windows. It stands on a corner site; both street-facing elevations were originally jettied, but only the smaller north face is now.	
60–62 Ifield Road		West Green; 51.1151°N 0.1971°W	II	This late-16th-century farmhouse was converted into cottages in the 19th century but is now one house again. One of the oldest buildings in the area now covered by West Green, it is timber-framed and has exposed joists, beams and trusswork inside. The exterior is partly tile-hung.	
8–10 Old Martyrs		Langley Green; 51.1307°N 0.1885°W	II	Martyrs Farm, west of the London Road, was named after Protestant martyr Thomas Dungate who was arrested there in 1556 and burnt at the stake. The farmhouse, now two houses, has exposed timber-framing, a tile-hung upper floor and a substantial chimney. A 20th-century extension was built in the same style.	
Barn at Gatwick Manor Inn		Lowfield Heath; 51.1397°N 0.1841°W	II	This weatherboarded timber barn, historically known as Hyder's Barn, is adjacent to the former hall but was built later. A room from a former inn in nearby Reigate was moved to Crawley and used as the basis of a structure which connects the two. The barn now forms part of the Gatwick Manor Inn restaurant complex. Internally, the roof has queen post supports.	
Barn east of Rowley Farmhouse		Lowfield Heath; 51.1417°N 0.1718°W	II	Standing next to Rowley Farmhouse, this is a medieval barn with a king post roof. The weatherboarded exterior conceals timber framing. The hipped roof is tiled.	
Bewbush Manor		Bewbush; 51.0990°N 0.2300°W	II	The manor of Beaubusson was first mentioned in 1315, and a manor house and moat were built. The present building on the site is 15th- or 16th-century, but brick façades added to all walls in about 1850 hide the original timber framing. The windows date from then, but some 17th-century internal features survive.	
Black Dog Cottage		Northgate; 51.1222°N 0.1817°W	II	Built in the late 16th century, this timber-framed farmhouse was altered in the 19th century when a brick façade was added. Some timber is still visible, and there is weatherboarding to the rear. The roof, steeply hipped to the sides, is tiled, and the original chimney survives.	
Blackwater Cottage		Pound Hill; 51.1129°N 0.1555°W	II	This small, two-storey cottage is partly tile-hung, partly weatherboarded and also has some exterior brickwork. The tiled roof is steeply hipped on one side. One of the chimneys is original. The building is no later than early-18th-century.	
Boscobel House		Northgate; 51.1176°N 0.1892°W	II	This 17th-century house, originally called Furnall Cottage, stands at the north end of the High Street between late-20th-century office blocks which have been designed in a complementary style. The ground floor was faced with bricks in the 18th century, and the first floor and roof are tiled.	
Brewery Shades		Northgate; 51.1156°N 0.1899°W	II	Behind a mostly modern exterior is a well-preserved timber-framed open hall house of the 15th century. Several structural alterations were made between the 17th and 19th centuries.	
Bridge at Ewhurst Place	(Note: This is on private land and is inaccessible.)	Ifield; 51.1233°N 0.2027°W	II	This brick bridge across the moat at Ewhurst Place was built in 1739, according to a plaque above the single arch. The coping at the top is in a triangular pattern.	
Broadfield House		Broadfield; 51.0964°N 0.1963°W	II	Built in about 1830, this stuccoed, slate-roofed house was extended about 30 years later to add a three-bay hall and a gallery above. Later uses included council offices and Mercury FM's broadcast base, but in 2008 Crawley Borough Council granted planning permission to convert the building into 12 flats. This did not happen, and it was turned into a free school in 2011.	
Brook Cottage		Ifield; 51.1164°N 0.2194°W	II	This timber-framed cottage with external brickwork and a tall chimney is one of the oldest houses in Ifield parish. It was started in about 1600, and retains some wattle and daub work from that era.	
Brookside		Tinsley Green; 51.1427°N 0.1540°W	II	This is a mid-17th-century timber-framed house in the old hamlet of Tinsley Green, now part of the Pound Hill neighbourhood. It has three bays, one of which is carried forward as an entrance porch.	
Caxtons		Pound Hill; 51.1161°N 0.1402°W	II	On the road to Turners Hill, this 16th-century cottage is timber-framed but has been clad externally in brick, weatherboarding and tiles. A tall chimney rises from the west side, and the interior retains inglenook fireplaces. Architect Philip Webb lived here and is commemorated by a blue plaque.	
Cherry Tree Cottage		Tinsley Green; 51.1403°N 0.1601°W	II	This large 17th-century house in Tinsley Green retains some external timber-framing and local stonework. Tile-hanging and brickwork are also in evidence. There is a small additional wing at the southeast corner, extending from the main east–west range.	
Church Cottage		Ifield; 51.1242°N 0.2189°W	II	The original church school of Ifield village is an 1840s Gothic-style stone building of three bays. The centre section has a roof with a wide gable; it is flanked by two recessed parts with smaller gabled sections. The tracery on the main ground-floor window echoes the style of a window in the adjacent St Margaret's Church.	
County Oak Cottage		Lowfield Heath; 51.1367°N 0.1906°W	II	This was built as a timber-framed cottage at the edge of Lowfield Heath in 1705, possibly as a conversion of an older barn. The building has been extended and converted into an office, but part of the original structure remains.	
Edgeworth House		Fernhill; 51.1567°N 0.1524°W	II	Although this four-bay timber-framed hall house lies within Gatwick Airport's boundary, surrounded by offices and a new hotel, its interior is well preserved: old timbers and open fireplaces remain. The roof has original tiles, and the exterior is partly brick and partly tile-hung. It adjoins Wing House, and dates from either the 15th century or c. 1520.	
Fir Tree Cottage		Northgate; 51.1241°N 0.1876°W	II	Now a house on the east side of London Road, this late-17th- or early-18th-century timber-framed structure was the Crawley parish workhouse by 1792. The roof is partly hipped, and this end has local tiles; the rest is of slate. The exterior exhibits a mix of exposed timber framing, stucco work, bricks and tiles.	
Flint Cottage		Tilgate; 51.0958°N 0.1935°W	II	A mansion called Tilgate, part of the 19th-century Tilgate estate (which covered 2,185 acres (884 ha)), was demolished in the 20th century—but one of its lodges remains and is in residential use. It is octagonal and has a slate roof and brick chimney, but the rest of the building is flint.	
Fountain and Pond Basin at Milton Mount Gardens		Pound Hill; 51.1274°N 0.1502°W	II	These stand in the grounds of the former Worth Park mansion, which was the centre of a 2,055-acre (832 ha) estate until it was sold for redevelopment in 1915. The grounds are still open to the public. Built as garden ornaments in 1884–87 by landscape gardeners James Pulham and Son, the structures use pale terracotta and were pre-cast.	
Friary Church of St Francis and St Anthony		Northgate; 51.1133°N 0.1878°W	II	H. S. Goodhart-Rendel's 1958–1959 church is "an important component" of the postwar centre of the New Town. It is now a Roman Catholic parish church, but was originally built for an order of Capuchin friars who were based at the site from 1861 until 1981. The new church's sanctuary is on the site of the old nave. The multicoloured brick building has a strongly patterned concrete ceiling.	
Frogshole Farm		Maidenbower; 51.1091°N 0.1475°W	II	Now a pub in the new Maidenbower neighbourhood, this mid-16th-century farmhouse is near St Nicholas' Church in Worth. It is a plaster- and brick-faced timber-framed structure with an old chimney connected to a large fireplace. One original window, with diamond mullions, remains. It reopened in July 2008 after a serious fire in February 2007.	
Garden wall and entrance to Worth Training Centre		Pound Hill; 51.1166°N 0.1471°W	II	The training centre building itself has a separate listing from the 18th-century stone structure which forms its boundary with the pavement on the road to Turners Hill. The wall is about 6 feet (1.8 m) tall and has large stone blocks with dressings and a cornice, and incorporates an entrance doorway with an architrave and pediment of the same materials.	
Goffs Manor		Southgate; 51.1098°N 0.2024°W	II	This timber-framed 16th-century building—the remnants of a four-bay open hall-house—was a farmhouse but is now a pub. Actor Peter Vaughan lived in the L-shaped building before its conversion. The brick-supported timber work is still in place on the ground floor; the upper storey is tiled, and the roof has Horsham stone tiles.	
Green Lane Old Cottage		Pound Hill; 51.1143°N 0.1459°W	II	This 17th-century cottage in Worth is one of two thatched cottages in the borough; the other is the older Radford Farmhouse. Although it is timber-framed, the beams are supported by infilled brickwork—an early example of this technique, which became common in Crawley. The west side differs: it has a tile-hung upper storey. The chimney is 18th-century.	
Harrow Cottage		Ifield; 51.1241°N 0.2184°W	II	This cottage is attached to Old Plough Cottage on the east side, and dates from the 18th century. The ground floor has diaper pattern brickwork, while the upper floor is hung with lozenge-shaped tiles.	
Hazelwick Grange		Three Bridges; 51.1248°N 0.1671°W	II	Formerly a farmhouse, this is believed to date from the 17th century. Its timber framing is augmented with white-painted brick. The front of the house, facing north, has a five-window range and a small porch with a gabled roof.	
Heathy Ground Farmhouse		Pound Hill; 51.1362°N 0.1462°W	II	This large former farmhouse, now a restaurant and pub, combines a four-bay 16th-century structure and an extra perpendicular wing added in the 19th century, when the rest of the building was restored with new brickwork and windows. The steep tiled roof has a large chimney stack. Inside, a narrow 18th-century wooden staircase survives next to a fireplace.	
Hillside Inn		Pound Hill; 51.1187°N 0.1478°W	II	This 17th-century building, altered two centuries later, has been a pub for most of its life, but other commercial activities have also taken place in it. It is now owned by the Vintage Inns chain. The two-storey brick building has a hipped slate roof with large eaves, a range of five sash windows and an original chimney-stack. A 19th-century brick carriage arch projects from the side wall.	
Ifield Mill House		Ifield; 51.1133°N 0.2244°W	II	This 16th-century house was converted into a pub in the 1970s after a demolition threat was averted. The core of the greatly extended building is a two-storey, two-bay, timbered hall-house with some old brickwork. The hipped roof is tiled and has some gabled dormer windows.	
Ifield Water Mill		Ifield; 51.1136°N 0.2225°W	II	The third building to stand on this site—after an iron forge and an earlier mill—is a 19th-century weatherboarded structure of three storeys, which was saved from dereliction in the 1970s when the Borough Council bought it. The ground floor is of brick, and the deeply eaved roof has slates from Wales. Volunteers have restored it to working order.	
Jordan's		Langley Green; 51.1280°N 0.1875°W	II	One of the earliest buildings on the London Road north of Crawley High Street, this 16th-century farmhouse was extended in the 18th and 19th centuries but retains substantial internal timberwork. The oldest part, the rear of the present building, has a steep, long roof and a tile-hung upper storey. The south side has a large full-height chimney.	
Jordan's Social Club		Langley Green; 51.1283°N 0.1876°W	II	This low, wide barn, with six bays and weatherboarded walls, is in the grounds of Jordan's and is part of the same complex. It was built in 1642 and retains some original timber beams inside.	
K6 Telephone Kiosks on High Street		West Green; 51.1153°N 0.1903°W	II	This pair of K6 telephone booths stand on the west side of Crawley High Street. The GPO commissioned Giles Gilbert Scott to produce the design—a bright red, cast iron box with a curved roof and crown motifs—in 1935.	
Knight's Acre (Note: Listed by English Heritage under its former name of "St Barbe Cottage".)		Lowfield Heath; 51.1385°N 0.1943°W	II	This three-bay house incorporates a chimney stack in the west end of one bay. An extension was built using matching materials in the mid-19th century. The upper floor, below the tiled half-hipped roof, is hung with lozenge-shaped tiles; the walls of the ground floor are white-painted brick.	
Langley Grange		Langley Green; 51.1298°N 0.2058°W	II	This early-17th-century cottage's main architectural feature is a stair vyse—a type of spiral staircase—whose newel extends the full three-storey height of the building. The house is timber-framed and clad in stone, brick and tiles, and has three bays and a prominent chimney.	
Langley Green Farmhouse		Langley Green; 51.1313°N 0.1985°W	II	This small cottage was built of brick in the 18th century. The upper storey is hung with tiles, and there is a substantial chimney-stack.	
Lilac Cottage		Fernhill; 51.1569°N 0.1436°W	II	Exterior paintwork hides a brick-built ground floor and a tiled upper storey of this late-18th-century house. Original chimneys, an inglenook and internal timber work are still in place, but the attached porch is modern.	
Little Orchards		Manor Royal; 51.1364°N 0.1655°W	II	This timber-framed house, built in the 16th century, survives among the factories and warehouses of the Manor Royal industrial estate. Many additions since the 19th century have transformed the north–south two-bayed building into an L-shaped structure with a prominent porch. A stone chimney-stack extends from ground level on the north side.	
Lowfield Hall		Lowfield Heath; 51.143716°N 0.1957°W	II	This was built as a barn in the first quarter of the 17th century, probably to serve Charlwood House which is adjacent. As originally built it would have been a weatherboarded timber structure. It was extended in the 18th century, given brick panelled walls in the 19th century and converted to residential use in or before the 1970s.	
Lychgate at St Nicholas' Church		Worth; 51.1106°N 0.1420°W	II	St Nicholas' Church has a 17th-century lychgate at its churchyard entrance. The roof is of Horsham stone, and the body is of timber arranged into arch formations on each side. It was rebuilt in 1956.	
Michaelmas Cottage		Ifield; 51.1277°N 0.2129°W	II	This timber-framed cottage was built in the 17th century at the northeast corner of Ifield's village green. Brickwork supports the timbers on the ground floor, and tiles cover the first floor walls. The roof comes down steeply on the north side, nearly to ground level. An entrance porch and tall chimney-stack stand at the west end.	
Mounting block at Friends Meeting House		Langley Green; 51.1267°N 0.2117°W	II	Mounting blocks were used to help riders mount their horses. This example was provided in the 18th century for worshippers at the Friends Meeting House. The three-step structure of stone treads on a brick base has storage space below its lintel.	
Newstead Lodge		Ifield; 51.1277°N 0.2146°W	II	This large and significantly altered house on Ifield Green has as its core a timber-framed building of about 1600. This part has a large chimney, weatherboarding and brickwork, and a tiled roof. The largest part of the building is the 19th-century east face, and a 20th-century addition projects from the west side. An 18th-century staircase survives inside.	
Oak Cottage		Lowfield Heath; 51.1367°N 0.1909°W	II	This adjoins County Oak Cottage but is now believed to have been built later in the 18th century. The adjacent Lowfield Heath was still open land at the time. It is brick-built and tile-clad, with a partly hipped roof.	
Oakfield Cottage		Pound Hill; 51.1183°N 0.1478°W	II	This L-shaped building dates from the early 18th century. The south wall has weatherboarding on both storeys, but other walls are brick to the ground floor and tile-hung on the upper storey. The brick chimneys on the tiled roof are original.	
Oakfield Lodge		Pound Hill; 51.1182°N 0.1479°W	II	This single-storey cottage forms an architectural group with the adjacent Oakfield Cottage, although it was built more than a century later. The stuccoed walls are topped by a hipped roof which supports a large chimney in the centre. The windows and doorcase are hood-moulded.	
Old Cottage		Fernhill; 51.1557°N 0.1438°W	II	This 17th- or early-18th-century cottage is in an isolated area known as Fernhill, at the northeast corner of the borough. The structural pattern is similar to many of Crawley's houses of that era, though: timber-framing hidden by ground-floor brickwork and first-floor tiles, and a tiled roof. A chimney rises at the west end from a foundation of local stone, quarried in Charlwood.	
Old Fox House		Langley Green; 51.1428°N 0.2359°W	II	This small 18th-century house is on Upper Prestwood Farm close to the Grade II-listed farmhouse. Its roughcast walls hide brickwork and timber framing, and the tiled roof is hipped. It is supported on staddle stones.	
Old House		Langley Green; 51.1269°N 0.1875°W	II	Like Jordans, this was an early example of development stretching north up the London Road. The timber-framed cottage is late-17th-century but has been added to in the 19th century and more recently. The tiled roof, hipped at both ends, is original, as is the brickwork and tile-hanging on the west and south faces. The roof supports a chimney-stack.	
Old Inn Cottage		Langley Green; 51.1271°N 0.2105°W	II	This house may originally have been an open hall-house of 2½ bays: some of the internal timberwork is heavily blackened by smoke. Chimneys have been added at both ends of the partly hipped roof. The timber framework is mostly obscured by brickwork and tiles, but some is visible on an extension at the rear.	
Old Plough Cottage		Ifield; 51.1241°N 0.2183°W	II	This early-17th-century L-shaped building was originally the Old Plough Inn; the modern Plough, built next door, superseded it in around 1900. It has been renovated, but retains its original chimney and roof tiles. Elizabeth Fry held a Quaker meeting here in 1837.	
Old Rectory		Ifield; 51.1259°N 0.2181°W	II	Ifield's rectory was built by 1830 and does not appear to have replaced an older building. The stuccoed building is in the Classical style with Doric columns around the entrance porch, shallow slate roofs with prominent eaves and a mixture of gables and hips, sash windows and a conservatory.	
Oldlands Farmhouse		Tinsley Green; 51.1414°N 0.1573°W	II	The owner of Tinsley Forge, Tinsley Green's ironworking facility (and one of Sussex's last working forges), built this three-bay timber-framed house for himself in the early 17th century. The two-storey building is mostly tiled on the exterior, but some plasterwork remains. A gabled porch provides the entrance, and there is a stair turret. The slate roof supports a chimney. The house is no longer a farm, but is still occupied.	
Plough Inn		Ifield; 51.1242°N 0.2181°W	II	Part of a group formed by the adjacent Old Plough Cottage and Harrow Cottage, this is the newest of the buildings: it was built in 1900 to replace the Old Plough, which was converted to residential use. The walls are clad in painted cement, and the roof is tiled and has two chimneys. Pevsner described it as "specially nice".	
Poles Acre Barn		Lowfield Heath; 51.1399°N 0.1949°W	II	This barn in the grounds of Poles Acre Farm on the edge of Lowfield Heath was built in the 17th century. Its three bays are timber-framed and supported by exterior brickwork. Internally, the roof is held up by queen posts, struts and purlins.	
Pulhamite Rock Islet in Lake at Milton Mount Gardens		Pound Hill; 51.1294°N 0.1526°W	II	The James Pulham and Son firm of landscape gardeners created this 10-foot (3.0 m)-wide artificial island in the 1880s as a decorative feature for the lake in the grounds of Worth Park mansion, owned by Sir F.A. Montefiore. It is of Pulhamite artificial stone and lies on a base of clinker and old bricks.	
Pulhamite Rockery at Milton Mount Gardens		Pound Hill; 51.1277°N 0.1479°W	II	Another 1880s feature of the former Worth Park mansion's landscaped gardens, provided by James Pulham and Son using their own Pulhamite artificial rock, this rockery is nearly 50 feet (15 m) long and about 5 feet (1.5 m) tall. There is space inside for plants. The foundations are of scrap bricks and clinker cement.	
Radford Farmhouse		Tinsley Green; 51.1427°N 0.1536°W	II	Few thatched roofs have survived in the Crawley area, but this two-storey cottage has one. It is 16th-century, possibly from the 1550s. Situated next to Brookside in the old hamlet of Tinsley Green, it may have functioned as that farm's barn before being converted into a house in its own right. There is some exposed timber-framing and white-painted brickwork. Chimney-stacks at each end and a series of casement and dormer windows are also visible.	
Railway Signal Box		Southgate; 51.1125°N 0.1908°W	II	This brick structure, built in 1877, replaced a smaller signal box which opened with the railway line through Crawley in 1848. From 1978, it was downgraded to a "crossing box"—its only function was controlling the adjacent level crossing where the railway crossed Crawley High Street. It closed completely on 20 April 1986, but has been preserved. The ground floor has two round-arched windows between brick pilasters, and there are sash windows on the first floor, below the hipped roof.	
Ridley's		Pound Hill; 51.1234°N 0.1477°W	II	This small cottage sits on the east side of the Balcombe–Horley road. It has one full storey with attic space above, and is mostly 17th-century—although it may have been extended in the following century and was further added to in the 20th century. The tiled roof is gabled at each end. The timber framework is still visible.	
Ridley's Court		Pound Hill; 51.1264°N 0.1480°W	II	Now in residential use, this Classical-style brick and stone structure of 1882 was the stable-block of the former Worth Park mansion (now demolished). It could accommodate 18 carriages. The windows are topped by pediments, and there are some dormer windows facing the quadrangle-style courtyard. Each face of the central three-storey clock tower has pairs of oculi as well. The tower is surrounded by two-storey ranges.	
St Margaret's Cottage		Ifield; 51.1213°N 0.2177°W	II	This cottage was built on the Rusper Road in the early 19th century. The partly red-brick, partly tile-hung house has a tall chimney stack on the south side. The roof is of Welsh slate.	
St Mary Magdalene's Church		Bewbush; 51.0989°N 0.2294°W	II	When the Bewbush neighbourhood was built in the 1980s, this 17th-century barn was retained, and was later converted into the estate's Anglican church. It is timber-framed with a dark weatherboarded exterior. Queen posts and tie-beams support the roof, whose exterior is tiled.	
Spikemead Farmhouse		Lowfield Heath; 51.1417°N 0.1953°W	II	On Poles Lane close to Lowfield Heath, this open hall-house of 1604 retains its original smoke bay. The ground floor is of brick; above is tile-hung attic space. A chimney rises next to the south face. The entrance is through a gabled porch. An extra bay was added on the north side, and is used as a kitchen.	
Squires Garden Centre		Gossops Green; 51.1067°N 0.2054°W	II	The modern garden centre surrounds the former Little Buckswood Farmhouse, which is part of the complex. It dates from the 16th century and is partly timber-framed (with some exterior brickwork) and partly tile-hung. The steep, tiled roof has both hips and gables, and its chimney has been dated to about 1600.	
Street House		Worth; 51.1107°N 0.1418°W	II	This 17th-century house, formerly an inn in the village of Worth, stands by the lychgate of St Nicholas' Church. Weatherboarding and brickwork hides the timber framing of the walls, and the roof is tiled with slabs of Horsham stone.	
Teizers Farmhouse	(Note: This is on private land and is inaccessible.)	Fernhill; 51.1503°N 0.1379°W	II	Formerly in the civil parish of Burstow in neighbouring Surrey, this farmhouse was built in the 17th century and added to in the 18th and 19th centuries. A timber-framed structure is supported by brown and red brickwork below a tile-hung upper floor. The hipped tiled roof has a large chimney. The diamond-paned windows are 19th-century.	
Table Tomb at St Margaret's Church		Ifield; 51.1239°N 0.2197°W	II	This stone tomb, raised on a plinth, has an oval-shaped projection on each side with decoration in the style of Robert Adam and inscriptions commemorating George and Mary Hutchinson, who were buried inside after their deaths in the late 18th century. The structure is topped by an urn.	
The Tweed		Ifield; 51.1285°N 0.2163°W	II	Formerly the Ifield parish workhouse, this 18th-century building was divided into two cottages but is now a single unit again. There is a chimney stack at each end, an original tiled roof (whose gable ends are also tile-hung) and some timber framing. The windows are surrounded by red-brick dressings.	
The Vicarage		Ifield; 51.1239°N 0.2185°W	II	The endowment of St Margaret's Church vicarage dates from 1247, and there was a building on the present site by 1532. The present house was built in the early 17th century and altered in the early 19th century, and is of stuccoed brick with a roof of Welsh slate (most buildings of a similar age in the area use Horsham stone). The upper floor has gable-headed dormer windows.	
Tinsley Farmhouse		Tinsley Green; 51.1416°N 0.1534°W	II	This 18th-century cottage has timber-framing to the upper floor only; the ground floor is brick-built. A steep tiled roof extends nearly to ground level on the north side, and is hipped to the east. Some tile-hanging remains at first-floor level, but exposed timbers are visible on one side. A chimney stands at the west end.	
Toll House		Worth; 51.1123°N 0.1430°W	II	Worth's former toll house is a single-storey structure with stucco walls and a shallow-pitched roof of slate. Its three wings form a T-shape. The entrance is in the south wing, through a gabled porch.	
Toovies Farmhouse	(Note: This is on private land and is inaccessible.)	Forge Wood; 51.1400°N 0.1432°W	II	This former farmhouse, now disused, latterly controlled land between the Balcombe–Horley road and the M23 motorway. The L-shaped building, dating from the 17th century, is dominated by an enormous chimney-stack on the west corner. The ground floor is of brick; the first floor is hung with red tiles. The windows are casements.	
Tree House		Northgate; 51.1167°N 0.1892°W	II	Crawley's former manor house has been empty since the Borough Council moved its Citizens Advice Bureau and other functions elsewhere, and it lies in an area scheduled for redevelopment. The 15th-century open hall-house was rebuilt a century later, and has a largely 18th-century exterior, but retains original king posts, tie-beams and trusses. The L-shaped building consists of a north–south Great hall and an east–west solar.	
Turks Croft		Ifield; 51.1166°N 0.2194°W	II	One of several isolated houses in the Crawley area by the 15th century, this timber-framed cottage was extended in the next two centuries, and has five bays: three are original, and one was an open hall. It was converted into a smoke bay in the 16th century, when two bays were added; a chimney came later. The exterior exhibits timber framing, brickwork and tile-hanging.	
Upper Prestwood Farmhouse		Langley Green; 51.1428°N 0.2363°W	II	Situated in the manor of Prestwood northwest of Ifield, the "unspoilt" main building on Upper Prestwood Farm is early-15th-century. It was built as an open hall house of four bays, into which a smoke bay was fitted later. When chimneys were invented, chimney-stacks and hearths superseded this. The building is timber-framed with a brick ground floor, and a crown post roof survives.	
War Memorial at St Michael and All Angels Church		Lowfield Heath; 51.1428°N 0.2363°W	II	This granite-built war memorial dates from c. 1925 and commemorates 37 residents of Lowfield Heath who died during World War I. A further ten names were added after World War II. A small plaque refers to the Bodmin Granite Company of Bodmin, Cornwall. The memorial takes the form of a wheelhead ("Celtic") cross on a wide plinth.	
White Hart Inn		Northgate; 51.1151°N 0.1899°W	II	This coaching inn was built in 1770—the year the London to Brighton road was fully turnpiked, improving the speed and convenience of stagecoaches and making Crawley the natural halfway stop. It replaced the smaller Ancient Priors, which until then had been an inn called The White Hart. The timber-framed, brick-clad structure incorporates part of an older building.	
Wing House		Fernhill; 51.1567°N 0.1524°W	II	Until about 2006, this mid-16th-century structure functioned as the restaurant and bar of an airport staff social club, but it is now disused. Charlwood stone forms the base; above this is brickwork and timber-framing, topped by a tiled roof with some Horsham stonework. The interior has four bays. The purlins of the interior roof structure are smoke-blackened.	
Worth Training Centre		Pound Hill; 51.1169°N 0.1474°W	II	Formerly associated with the nearby Oakfield Cottage, this greatly extended house was built in the late 18th century. The original part is of stone and has two storeys with attics above. Extra wings were added in brick in the early 19th and early 20th centuries. The building has a mansard roof.	

== See also ==
- List of conservation areas in Crawley
- List of places of worship in Crawley
- Locally listed buildings in Crawley

== Bibliography ==
- Bastable, Roger (1983). Crawley: A Pictorial History. Chichester: Phillimore & Co. ISBN 0-85033-503-5.
- Bastable, Roger (1986). Crawley: The Making of a New Town. Chichester: Phillimore & Co. ISBN 0-85033-613-9.
- Blow, Christopher J. (2005). Transport Terminals and Modal Interchanges: Planning and Design. Oxford: Elsevier. ISBN 0-7506-5693-X.
- Goldsmith, Michael (1987). Crawley and District in Old Picture Postcards. Zaltbommel: European Library. ISBN 90-288-4525-9.
- Goldsmith, Michael (1990). Around Crawley in Old Photographs. Stroud: Alan Sutton Publishing. ISBN 0-86299-716-X.
- Gwynne, Peter (1990). A History of Crawley (1st ed.). Chichester: Phillimore & Co. ISBN 0-85033-718-6.
- Harding, Joan M. (1976). Four Centuries of Charlwood Houses: Medieval to 1840 (PDF). Charlwood: The Charlwood Society. ISBN 0-9504892-0-4.
- Harris, Roland B. (December 2008). Crawley Historic Character Assessment Report. Sussex Extensive Urban Survey (EUS) (Report). English Heritage in association with Crawley Borough Council. Archived from the original (PDF) on 9 October 2012.
- Henbery, E.W. (1996). Ifield Mill Restoration (6th ed.). Crawley: Crawley Museum Society.
- Hygate, Nâdine (1994). 49, High Street, Crawley. Horsham: Performance Publications.
- Hygate, Nâdine; Hughes, Annabella (1995). Ye Olde Punch Bowle, 101, High Street, Crawley. Horsham: Performance Publications.
- Mitchell, Vic; Smith, Keith (1986). Southern Main Lines: Crawley to Littlehampton. Midhurst: Middleton Press. ISBN 0-906520-34-7.
- Nairn, Ian; Pevsner, Nikolaus (1965). The Buildings of England: Sussex. Harmondsworth: Penguin Books. ISBN 0-14-071028-0.
- Shelley, Jean (1995). Early Houses in Crawley High Street. Crawley: Crawley High Street Conservation Committee and Crawley Museum Society.
- Volke, Gordon, ed. (1989). Historic Buildings of West Sussex. Partridge Green: Ravette Publishing Ltd. ISBN 1-85304-199-8.
