= Tinsley Green =

Area of Crawley, West Sussex, England

Coordinates: 51.1420°N 0.1546°W

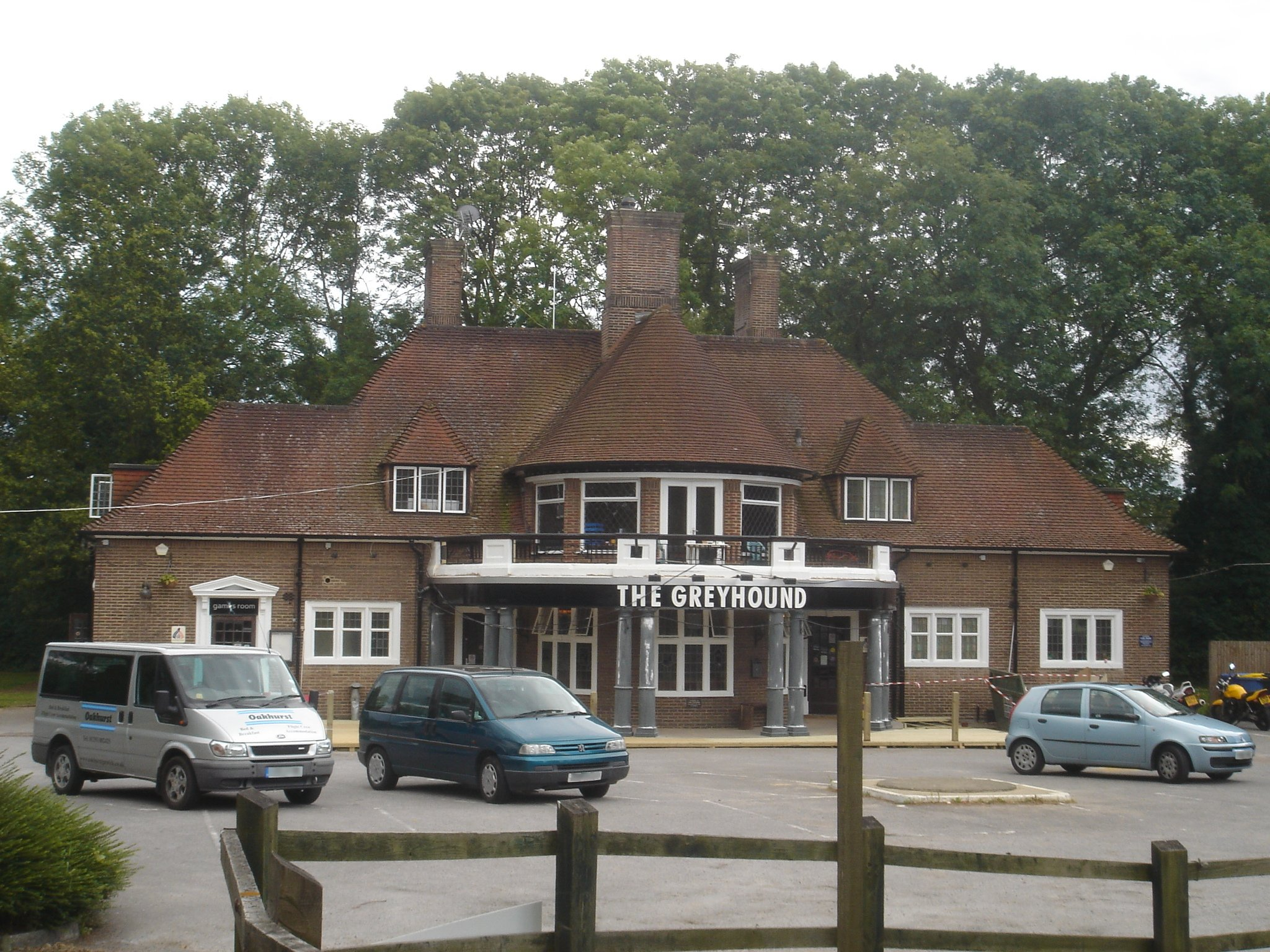
- The Greyhound pub

- Location within West Sussex
- OS grid reference: TQ291396
- District: Crawley
- Shire county: West Sussex
- Region: South East
- Country: England
- Sovereign state: United Kingdom
- Post town: CRAWLEY
- Postcode district: RH10
- Dialling code: 01293
- UK Parliament: Crawley

Tinsley Green is an area in the Borough of Crawley, one of seven local government districts in the English county of West Sussex. Originally a hamlet in the parish of Worth, it was absorbed by the New Town of Crawley in the 1940s and became part of the Pound Hill neighbourhood. As well as houses, farms and woodland, it became the site of the 1930s aerodrome at Gatwick—now London Gatwick Airport. The airport's first railway station was briefly known as Tinsley Green. The game of marbles has a strong local tradition, and Tinsley Green's pub hosts the British and World Marbles Championship each year.

== Location ==
Tinsley Green is in the north-east of the Borough of Crawley. The surrounding land is flat and between 210 feet (64 m) and 250 feet (76 m) above sea level. Gatwick Stream, a tributary of the River Mole, passes under Radford Road at Tinsley Bridge. The road runs east–west from the B2036 road to Crawley's Manor Royal industrial estate. The Brighton Main Line between London and Brighton runs to the west.

== History ==
The name was first recorded in the 13th century, when Richard de Tyntesle (Richard of Tinsley) was recorded on a tax return. The iron industry thrived in the area from the late 14th century, when the blast furnace was developed; conditions and raw materials around Crawley were ideal for iron production, and many forges were established. One of these was Tinsley Forge. Cast iron was produced at a blast furnace at Tilgate and taken to Tinsley Green, where it was formed into the more useful wrought iron. Although the industry declined in the 17th century, Tinsley Forge was still successful until well into the 18th century, when it finally shut down. Forge Farm was established on the site; the name Black Corner, a bend on the Balcombe–Horley road (the B2036; an old route to London) which runs through Tinsley Green, also refers to the old industry.

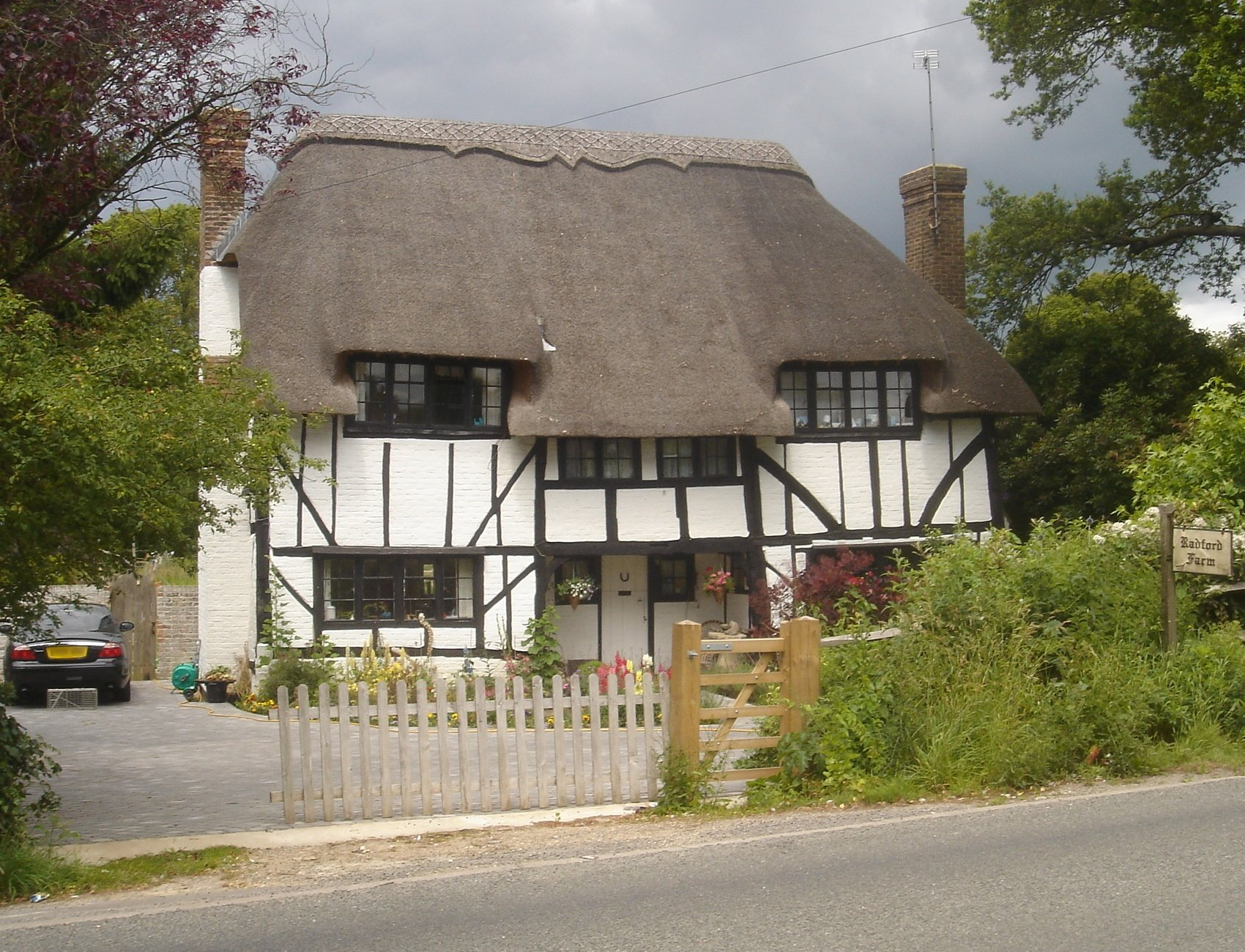
Radford Farmhouse

Some 16th- and 17th-century farmhouses and cottages survive. Radford Farmhouse, a Grade II listed building, is one of only two buildings in Crawley with a thatched roof. The timber-framed cottage may originally have been a barn on the land of its neighbour, Brookside—another Grade II-listed timber-framed house. Oldlands Farmhouse, also 17th-century, was built and owned by the ironmaster who owned Tinsley Forge.

Tinsley Green was served by the Anglican church at Lowfield Heath, St Michael and All Angels, from its opening in 1868. It is now within the parish of Crawley Team Ministry, whose main church is St John the Baptist's in the town centre.

London Country Bus Services, a bus company which served southeast England between 1970 and deregulation in 1986, built its main engineering workshop in Tinsley Green. Opened in 1976, it was used to carry out painting, repairs and mechanical overhaul of the company's fleet (1,267 vehicles in 1970), and to hold spare parts. At the time of deregulation, a private company, Gatwick Engineering Ltd, was set up to own and operate the works. About 150 people were employed at the site in Tinsley Lane, next to the railway line. National Express owned the site as at 2013.

=== Gatwick Aerodrome to Airport ===
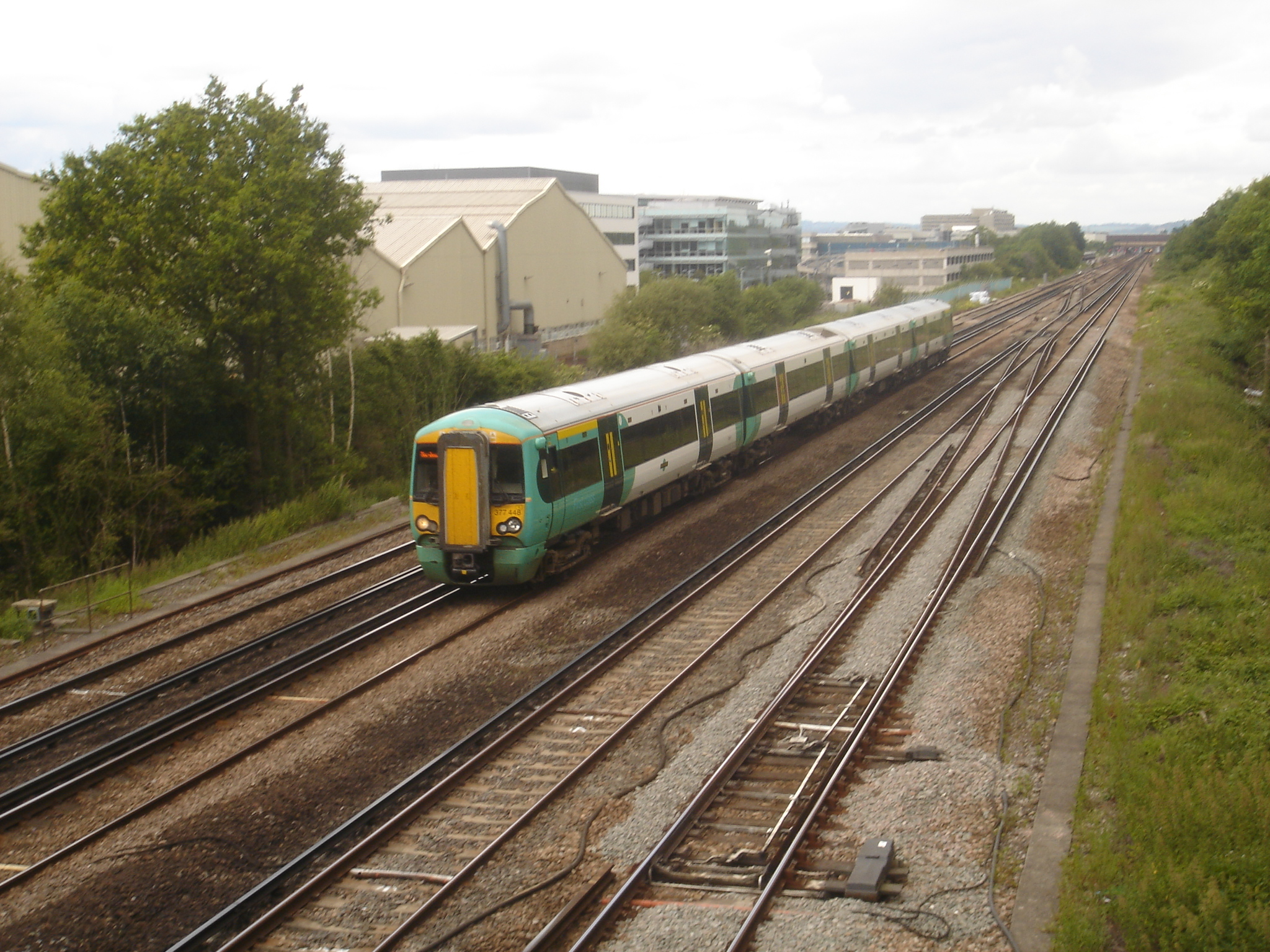
A Southern train passes the site of the former Tinsley Green station

Hunts Green Farm was one of Tinsley Green's old farms. In the 1920s, some of its land was converted into an airfield as flying became more popular and more landing grounds were sought. Earlier in the decade, London's first airport had been established in Croydon. On 1 August 1930, Ronald Walters, a pilot, bought the 260 acres (110 ha) of land at Hunts Green Farm and converted it into an aerodrome. In 1933 it was sold to A. M. (Morris) Jackaman, who planned to convert it into a relief aerodrome for Croydon Airport and start regular flights to Paris using de Havilland DH.84 Dragon aircraft. From 1935 the Air Ministry were involved; they helped to develop Gatwick Aerodrome's role as a proper airport, and the first terminal building, the Beehive, was built. Later that year, the Southern Railway, Imperial Airways and the owners of Gatwick (now a proper airport rather than an aerodrome) jointly opened a new railway station on the Brighton Main Line, between Gatwick Racecourse and Three Bridges stations, to serve the airport. The station, called Tinsley Green, opened just north of the Radford Road overbridge on 3 September 1935. It was linked by a subway to the terminal, named The Beehive. The name was changed to Gatwick Airport station on 1 June 1936, and it closed on 28 May 1958 after the airport had been rebuilt and extended northwards, making the former Gatwick Racecourse station more convenient. Remains of the platforms could be seen until the 1980s and the subway is still in existence at the Beehive end.

== Crawley North East Sector ==
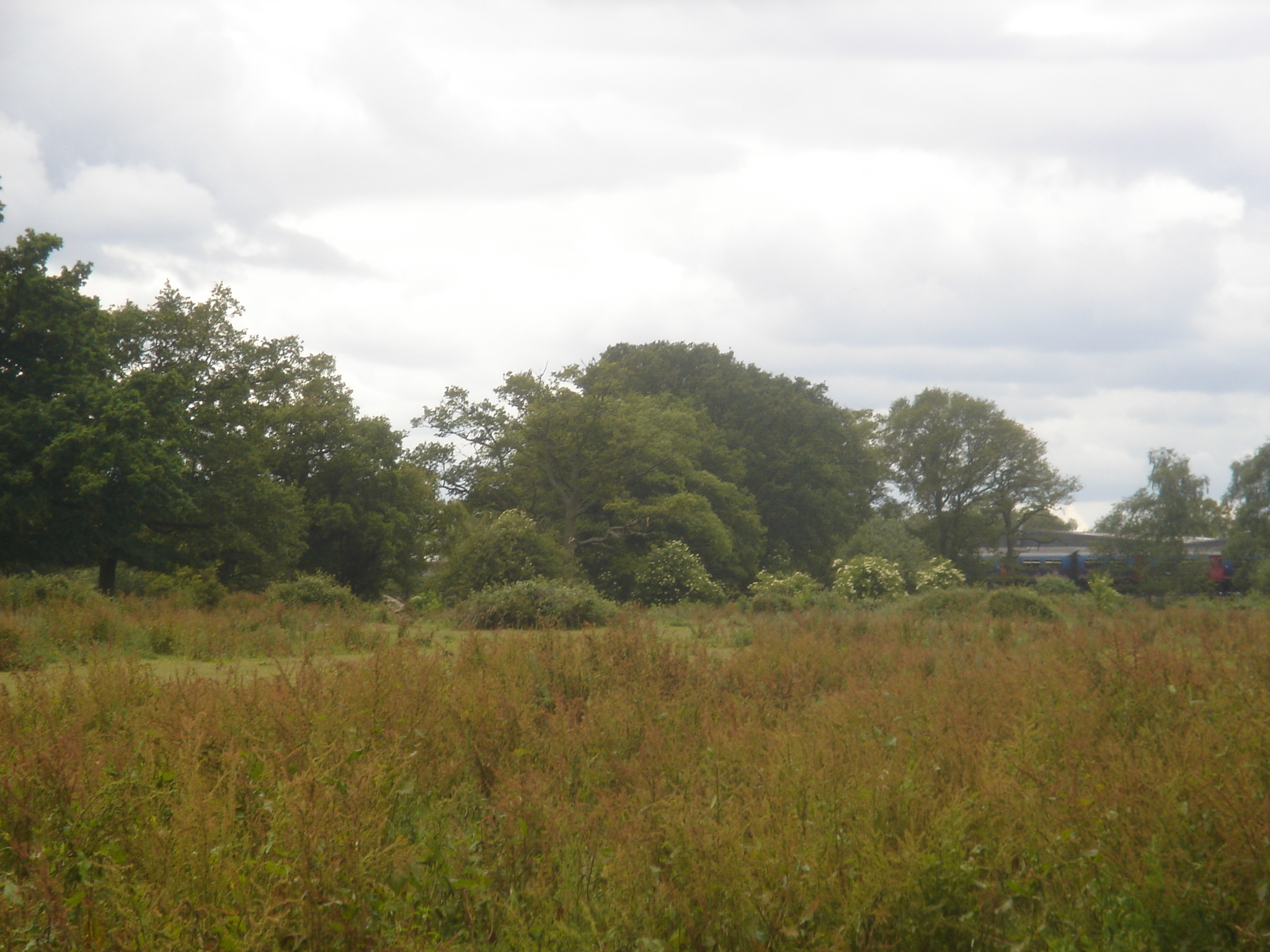
Rough pastureland in Tinsley Green, within Crawley North East Sector

Crawley New Town's postwar residential areas are known as neighbourhoods. As of 2009, the town has 13. Plans to build a fourteenth neighbourhood on land around Tinsley Green have existed since January 1998. The North East Sector, as it is known, is bounded by Radford Road to the north, the M23 motorway to the east, the A2011 Crawley Avenue to the south and the railway line to the west, and is characterised by rough pastureland, small woods and some brownfield land. Tinsley Green occupies the northern part of this site. As one of the few areas of mostly open land left in the borough, the area around Tinsley Green has been suggested as a development site before: the Commission for New Towns' first masterplan in the late 1940s anticipated that the Manor Royal industrial estate would extend east of the railway line as far as the Balcombe–Horley road, which did not happen; and in the late 1980s, a "high-tech industrial park" was planned for the site of Forge Farm, which was no longer agricultural and had become the site of an abattoir.

The original planning application proposed up to 1,900 residential units, office and retail space, a school, a community centre, playing fields and improvements to road and other infrastructure, including the moving of overhead power lines and pylons. Bus services would be provided to other parts of Crawley, and a new railway station (south of its predecessor) would be considered. Although permission was initially refused, several amendments and appeals were made, and in December 2009 the Government permitted another appeal. A decision would then be made by March 2010. Issues relevant to the scheme include aircraft noise (because of the proximity to Gatwick Airport), the possibility of a second runway being built on the south side of the airport, land contamination and housing density. In February 2011, outline planning permission was granted by Eric Pickles, the Community Secretary, on appeal. Crawley Borough Council adopted the name Forge Wood for the new neighbourhood in December 2013, and construction work started in 2014 along Steers Lane.

== Marbles ==
The game of marbles has been played in Tinsley Green and the surrounding area for many centuries: TIME magazine traces its origins to 1588. The British and World Marbles Championship has been held at Tinsley Green's pub, The Greyhound, every year since 1932. Traditionally, the marbles-playing season started on Ash Wednesday and lasted until midday on Good Friday: playing after that brought bad luck. More than 20 teams from around the world take part in the championship, each Good Friday; German teams have been successful several times since 2000, although local teams from Crawley, Copthorne and other Sussex and Surrey villages often take part as well; the first championship in 1932 was won by a team from nearby Hookwood. The pub was rebuilt in its present form in 1936, and permanent rings were installed outside for marbles to be played upon.

== See also ==
- Listed buildings in Crawley
