= Ifield Friends Meeting House =

Friends meeting house in Crawley, West Sussex, England

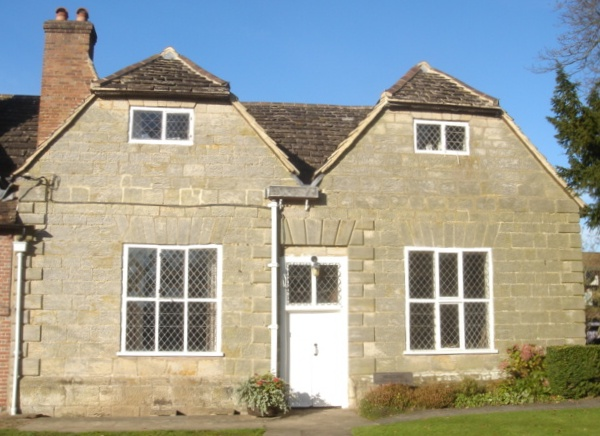
- The façade from the southeast

- Location within Crawley

Religion
- Affiliation: Religious Society of Friends
- Ecclesiastical or organisational status: Friends meeting house
- Year consecrated: 1676
- Status: Active

Location
- Location: Langley Lane, Ifield, Crawley, West Sussex, United Kingdom
- Coordinates: 51°7′36″N 0°12′42″W

Architecture
- Completed: 1676
- Direction of façade: South

The Ifield Friends Meeting House is a Friends meeting house (Quaker place of worship) in the Ifield neighbourhood of Crawley, a town and borough in West Sussex, England. Built in 1676 and used continuously since then by the Quaker community for worship, it is one of the oldest purpose-built Friends meeting houses in the world. It is classified by English Heritage as a Grade I listed building, a status given to buildings of "exceptional interest" and national importance. An adjoining 15th-century cottage is listed separately at Grade II*, and a mounting block in front of the buildings also has a separate listing at Grade II. Together, these structures represent three of the 100 listed buildings and structures in Crawley.

== History ==
The Ifield area has a long history of Protestant Nonconformism and Dissent. As early as 1655, George Fox—one of the founders of the Religious Society of Friends—and a Quaker preacher, Alexander Parker, held meetings and preached at a private house in the village. Meetings became more regular in the next two decades, but were still held in parishioners' houses. There were strong feelings both in favour of and against the growing Quaker community: the vicar of St Margaret's Church (the parish church) between 1667 and 1679, Henry Halliwell, was strongly opposed to Nonconformism and preached and wrote against it, whereas a protest in the church in 1658 by a parishioner sympathetic to Quaker beliefs was allowed to continue without interruption. William Penn lived nearby before leaving England for America and founding Pennsylvania; he had links with the local Quaker community and the meeting house in their early days, and clashed with Henry Halliwell. In response to Penn's 1673 treatise entitled Wisdom Justified of her Children from Calumny of Henry Halliwell, Halliwell wrote a piece called Impertinent Cavils of William Penn.

By 1676, 27% of adults in the parish of Ifield, which covered 4,000 acres (1,600 ha) of mostly rural land in north Sussex, described themselves as Nonconformist. Some would have been Presbyterians, Unitarians or Baptists, for example, but most were Quakers. Meetings for Quaker women in the parish were started the previous year. In 1676, land and money bequeathed by a local blacksmith, Robert Robinson, was used to build a dedicated, purpose-built meeting house for the community. It has been continuously used for worship since then, and is one of the oldest Friends meeting houses still in existence anywhere in the world.

=== Restoration ===
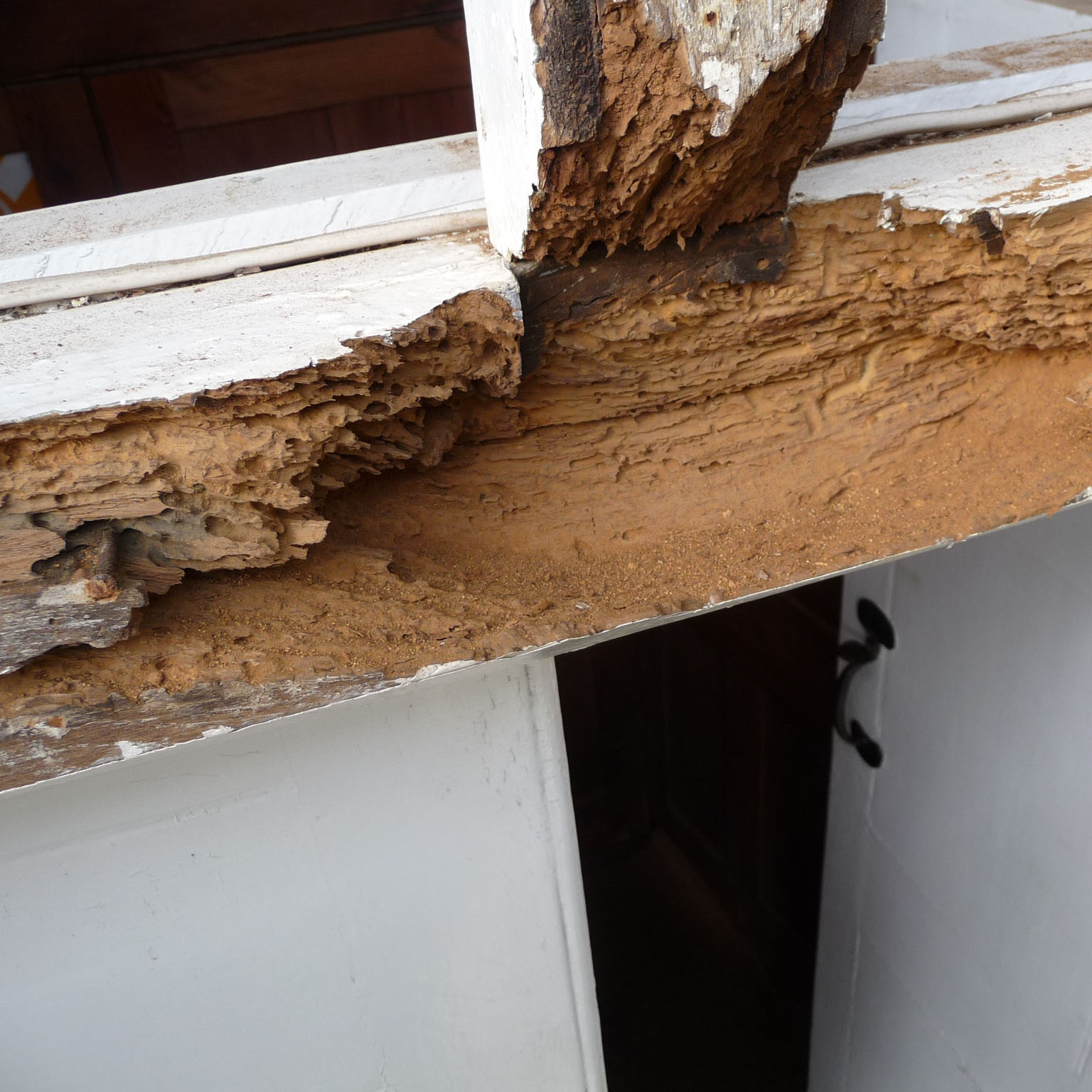
Survey of a window frame before restoration work began

The Meeting House and Cottage were restored during 2010 and 2011. HMDW Architects surveyed the buildings and managed the project, and Alfred Cox & Sons (Brighton) carried out the work. This included replacing decayed timber lintels and cills, removing rotting timber bearers, repointing the masonry, carrying out timber repairs to the original window frames, and installing new amenities to improve accessibility and hospitality.

== Meeting house ==
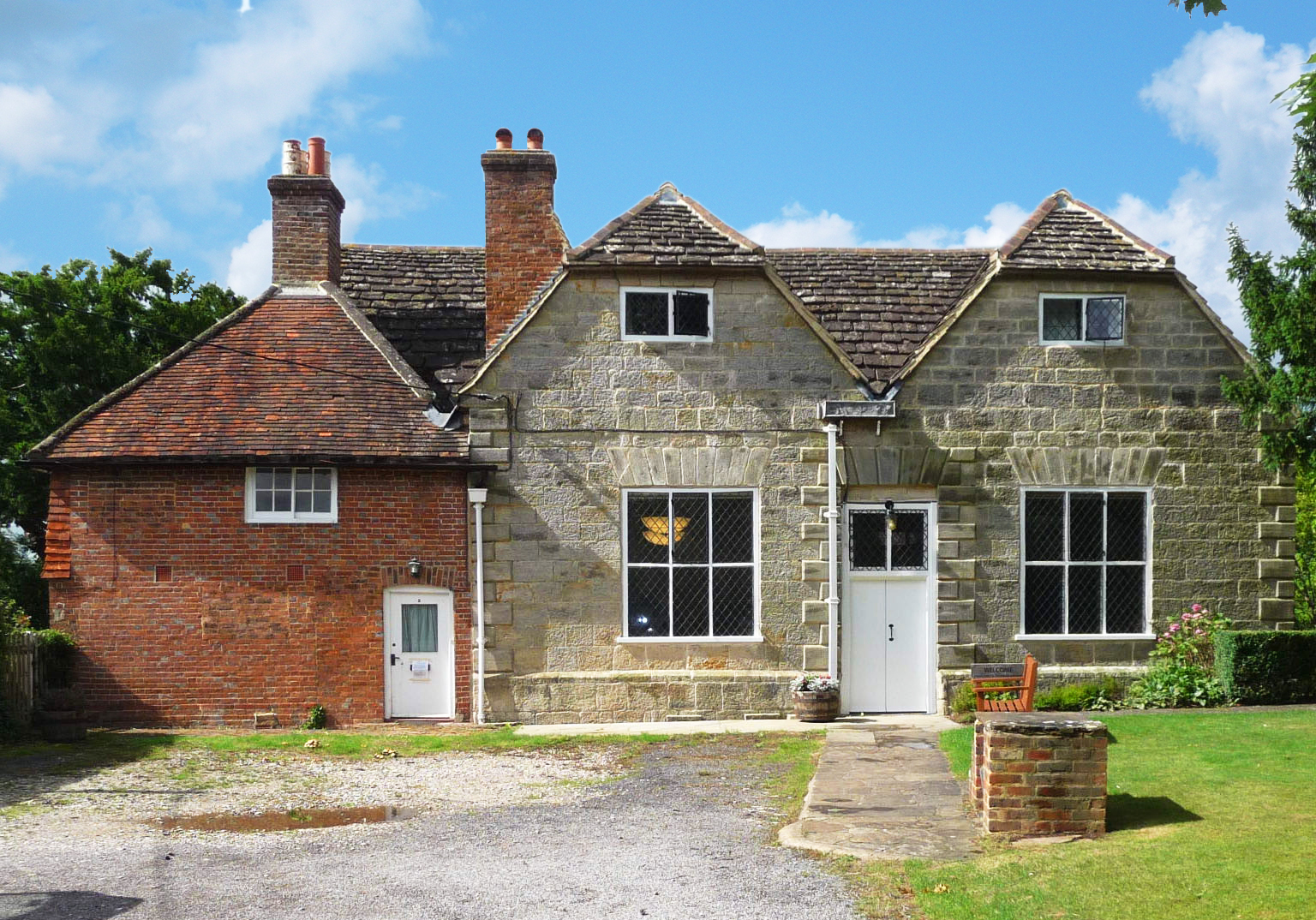
The restored south-eastern elevation: note the repointing. The meeting house is on the right and 5 Langley Lane is on the left.

The meeting house has ashlar walls made of local sandstone. The roof slates are also made of a local material—Horsham stone. The frontage has two bays with half-hipped gable roofs. The entrance doorway is centrally placed between the bays and still has its original rustication at the quoins, although the door itself is modern. The lintel of the doorway has "1676" carved into it, and some of the quoin blocks also have 17th-century dates and initials. There is another (off-centre) doorway on the rear face of the building. This has one window at ground-floor level, whereas the frontage has one in each bay with wooden mullions and transoms. There are smaller windows at first-floor level.

Extensions and additions have been made since the 17th century. Many of the internal fittings are made of pine and were installed in the 18th century. A burial ground was also added. By 1851 the capacity was 162, although use of the meeting house had declined from a peak of nearly 100 worshippers earlier in the century.

The meeting house was given a Grade I listing by English Heritage on 21 June 1948. It is one of three buildings with that designation in the Borough of Crawley; the others are St Margaret's Church and St Nicholas' Church at Worth.

== 5 Langley Lane ==
The cottage now known as the Meeting House Cottage, at 5 Langley Lane, is two centuries older than the meeting house itself. It is a two-storey timber-framed cottage built in the late 15th century. Robert Robinson owned it and the adjacent land in the late 17th century; he passed the cottage, his blacksmith workshop and all the surrounding land to the local Quaker community in 1674. As a result, the meeting house was built on to its eastern side. A red-brick facing was applied to the south face in the 18th century, and the west side is partly brick-faced and partly tiled. The roof is also tiled, and held up inside by crown posts. English Heritage classified the cottage, which is still used by the warden of the meeting house, as a Grade II* listed structure on 23 February 1983.

== Mounting block ==
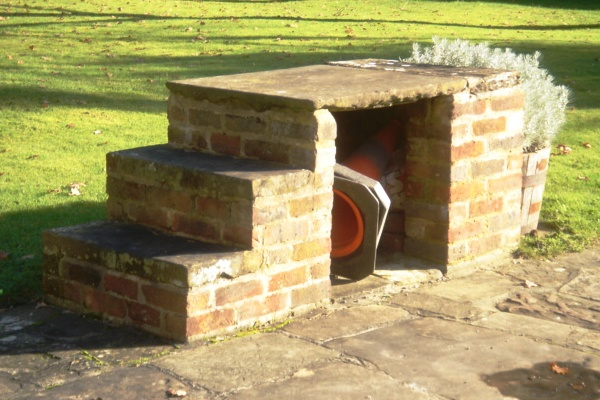
The mounting block

A mounting block is a slab or set of steps which enables a horse rider to mount or dismount a horse. An 18th-century example stands on the forecourt outside the meeting house. The main structure is brick, but the three steps have stone treads. There is a space inside for storage. The top of the block is spanned by a stone lintel. The structure is recognised separately by English Heritage, which listed it at Grade II on 23 February 1983.

== See also ==
- List of places of worship in Crawley
- Listed buildings in Crawley
