= West Green, West Sussex =

Area of Crawley, England

Coordinates: 51.123°N 0.192°W

West Green
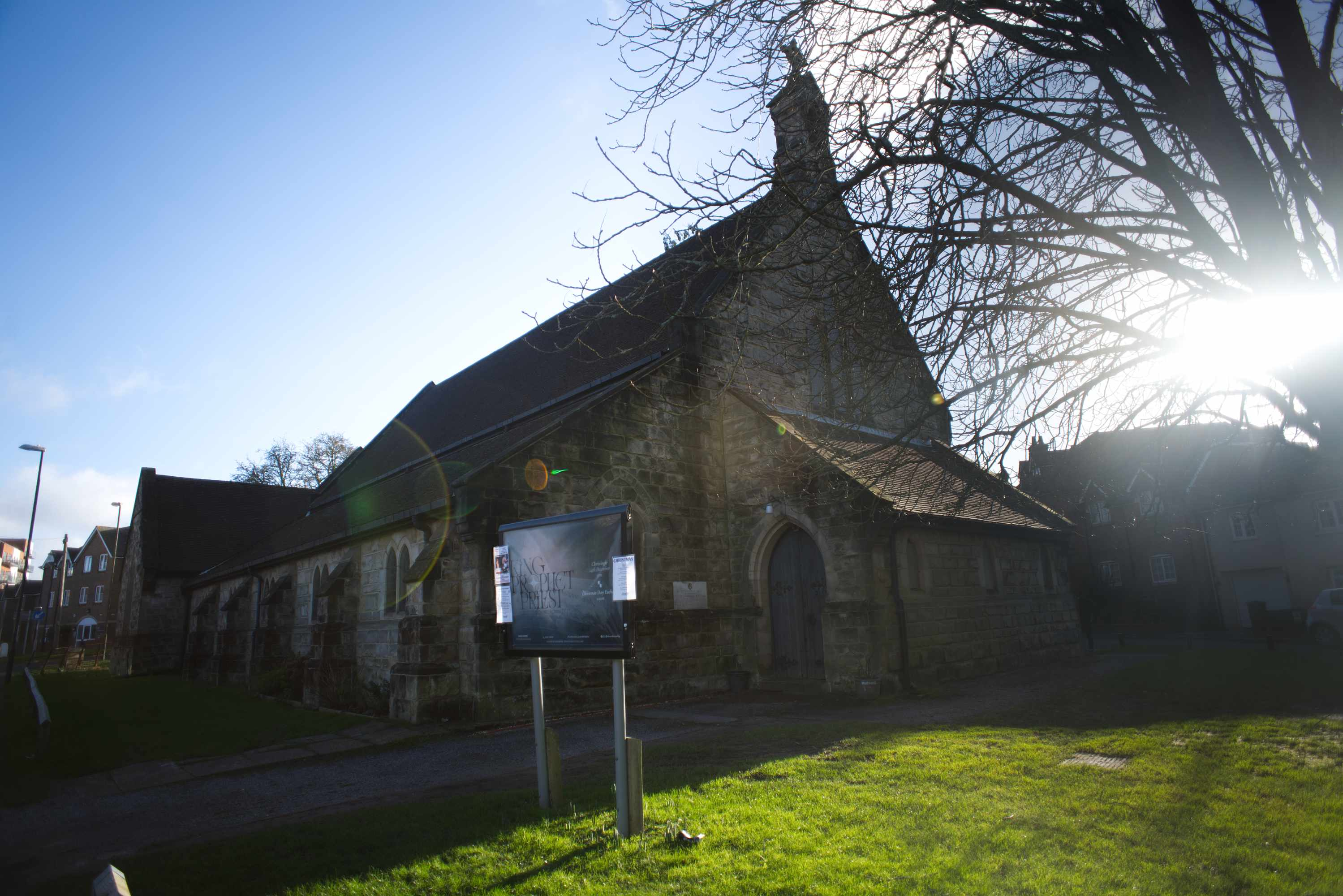
- St Peter's Church

- Location within West Sussex
- Population: 4,404
- OS grid reference: TQ265375
- District: Crawley
- Shire county: West Sussex
- Region: South East
- Country: England
- Sovereign state: United Kingdom
- Post town: CRAWLEY
- Postcode district: RH11
- Dialling code: 01293
- Police: Sussex
- Fire: West Sussex
- Ambulance: South East Coast
- UK Parliament: Crawley

West Green is one of the 14 residential neighbourhoods in Crawley, a town and borough in West Sussex, England. Crawley was planned and laid out as a New Town after the Second World War, based on the principle of self-contained neighbourhoods surrounding a town centre of civic and commercial buildings. West Green was the first neighbourhood to be developed, and is one of the smallest and closest to the town centre.

== Location within Crawley ==
West Green is a roughly triangular area of 123 hectares (300 acres), bounded by the Arun Valley railway line to the south, the A23 (Crawley Avenue) to the west and north, and the High Street to the east. The latter formed part of the main London to Brighton road until it was bypassed in the 1930s. Northgate and the town centre lie to the east, Southgate is to the south, Ifield is to the west and Langley Green shares a border to the north.

When the New Town was planned, each neighbourhood was allocated a colour, which appears on street name signs together with the neighbourhood's name. West Green's colour is dark blue.

== History ==
A small settlement developed in the Anglo-Saxon era around a crossroads where a northeast–southwest trackway connecting the main Saxon-era estates and farms of the Weald crossed an east–west route between Worth and Ifield. After the Norman Conquest, the pattern of land use and travel changed, and a new north–south route between London and the south coast developed slightly to the east. Crawley, originally a small village itself, grew around this from the 13th century onwards. The two settlements, 0.25 miles (0.4 km) apart, grew slowly alongside each other for the next few centuries. The name "West Green" was first recorded in 1532.

In the 19th century, the increasing prosperity of Crawley—by now, a thriving market town—stimulated residential growth in West Green. In 1841 it had only 20 houses, but the arrival of the railway in the town in 1848 was significant: the existing development at West Green was close to Crawley railway station, and land was available for further building. This took place haphazardly and without any planning: local builders erected individual houses or streets speculatively and in a mixture of styles. The variety of villas, semi-detached houses and terraces in Leopold, Spencers, Victoria, Albany and Princess Roads—built in the 1880s just north of the railway line— typify this. In the same decade a small chapel was built—the forerunner of St Peter's Church, an Anglican church built on a triangle of land near the ancient crossroads in 1893. The east–west track had become the main Ifield Road, and Horsham Rural District Council—responsible for the land in the early 20th century—built some council housing along the road in the interwar period. Overall, of approximately 900 houses built in Crawley during that time, more than 100 were built in West Green.

John George Haigh, who moved to Crawley from London in 1943, carried out six murders—known as the "Acid Bath Murders"—at a workshop in Leopold Road between 1944 and 1949. He was hanged for his crimes in August of that year. The case brought notoriety to the town and aroused considerable interest among local people.

=== New Town era ===
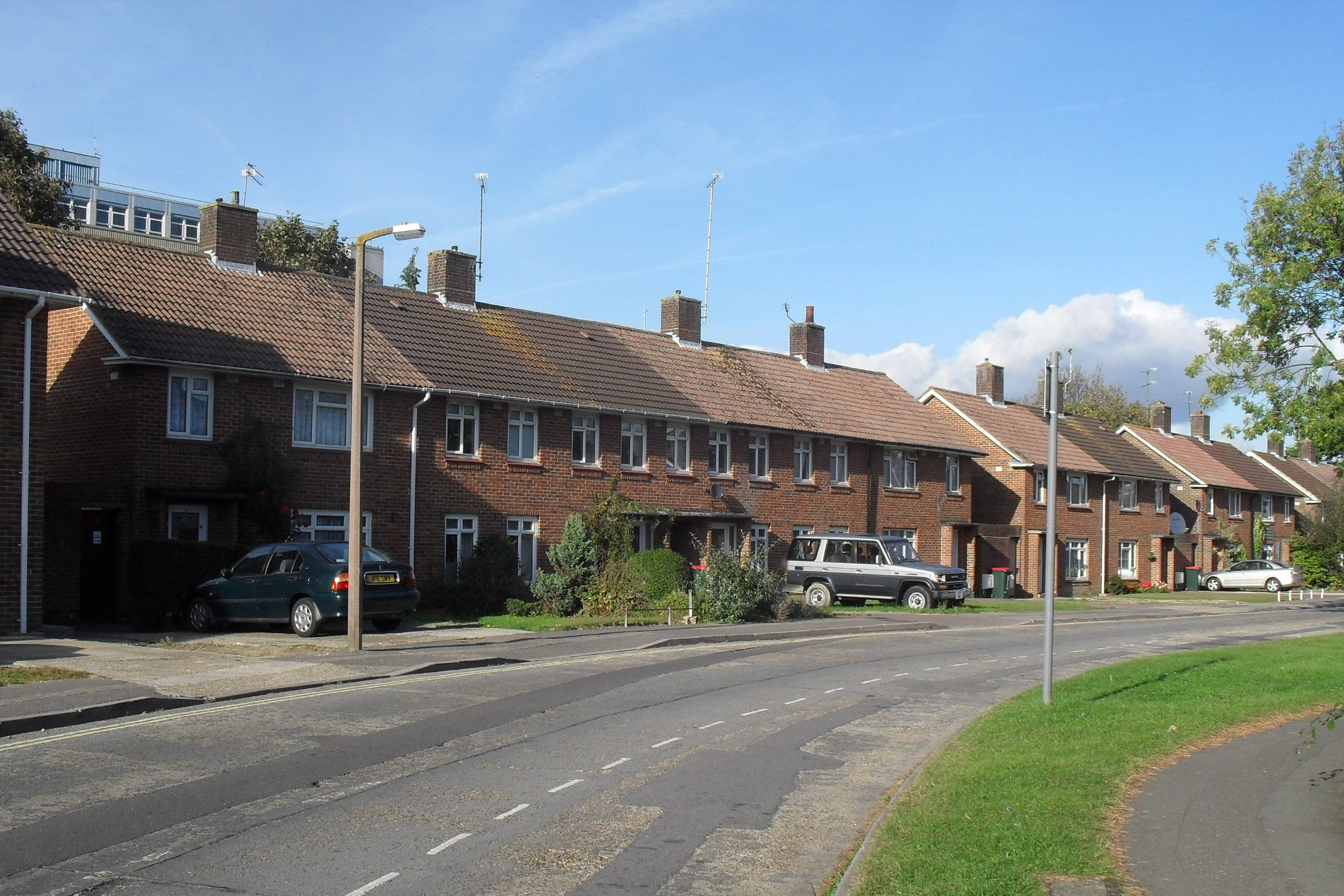
Looking northeast along Smalls Mead, the first residential development of the New town

Crawley was designated as a New Town in January 1947 after the New Towns Act 1946 identified it as a suitable site for one. Crawley Development Corporation was formed, led by the architect Thomas Bennett, and planner Anthony Minoprio provided a master plan for the town's development. He proposed a double ring of nine neighbourhoods surrounding an extended town centre; West Green was to be one of the inner ring of four, and the first to be built. By 1949, when building work started, West Green's population was about 2,000—mainly concentrated in the area between Ifield Road and the railway line—and the Development Corporation had to consider how to fit new development around this.

By the end of the 1948–1949 financial year, the Development Corporation had bought 13 acres (5.3 ha) of land in West Green, and was negotiating the acquisition, mostly by compulsory purchase order, of another 133 acres (54 ha). At that stage, 117.5 acres (47.6 ha) were intended to be developed immediately. Most of the land was designated for housing, the neighbourhood centre (parade of shops, pub and community centre) and a new school, but about 20 acres (8.1 ha) were reserved for open space and allotments. Minoprio planned a wide variety of housing types, from high-density low-rise blocks of flats near the town centre to large detached houses.

The New Town's first set of houses were built in West Green during this period. In 1947, the Development Corporation granted the design contract for 34 houses to architectural practice Godman & Kay. A Hove-based firm, H.J. Paris Ltd, won the £7,397 (£250,200 today) contract for the road construction and site preparation in 1948. The Horsham-based building firm Hoad & Taylor built the houses at a cost of £45,220 (£1,421,600 today), and residents moved in during the summer of 1949. The road ran northeastwards from the old Ifield Road and was named Smalls Mead; it lay near the path of one section of the ancient trackway, which had historically been called Smalls Lane. By 1952, 622 houses had been built or started, and the neighbourhood was effectively complete in 1954. By that time, the neighbourhood centre—with shops, post office, community centre and public house—had been established at the junction of Ewhurst Road and West Green Drive.

The southeastern corner of the neighbourhood was redeveloped early in the 21st century as part of the Borough Council's efforts to improve the town centre. Robinson Road, the site of Crawley's original hospital, post office and school, was demolished, and Spencers Road was severed. A large mixed-use development, anchored by an Asda superstore, was completed on the site in September 2003. Around the same time at the other end of the High Street, and again just within the boundary of West Green, the Crawley Leisure Park was built on the site of the Sun Inn. This was an old house at the northern end of Crawley village, which was converted into an inn in the 1870s.

== Demography ==
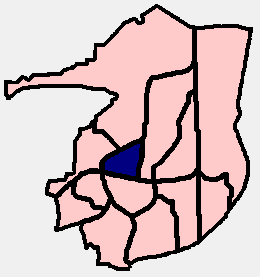
The Crawley Borough area, showing the 13 neighbourhoods; West Green is shown in dark blue

The neighbourhood is coterminous with the administrative ward of the same name, which is one of the fifteen wards in Crawley. These divisions are used for collecting census and other statistical and demographic data. It had a population of 4,404 at the 2001 United Kingdom Census. Its population density was therefore 35.82 inhabitants per hectare (14.50/acre)—much higher than the figure of 22.18 inhabitants per hectare (8.98/acre) for Crawley overall. There were 2,005 households, of which 1,125 (56%) were owned by the occupier, 668 (33%) were rented from Crawley Borough Council or another public-sector landlord, 143 (7%) were rented privately and 69 (3%) were occupied rent-free. The rate of owner-occupancy is much lower than in Crawley as a whole, and a much higher proportion of housing is rented from the council.

According to the census, 91.2% of residents are White, 6.2% are Asian or Asian-British, 1% are Black or Black-British, 0.9% are mixed-race and 0.7% are from another ethnic background. The proportion of white people is slightly higher, and that of Asian people slightly lower, than in Crawley overall; other proportions are comparable to Crawley as a whole. The age distribution of West Green's population is different from that of Crawley as a whole: as at the 2001 census, 866 (19.7% of residents) were under 18 years old, 2,558 (58.1%) were between 18 and 64 years old, and 980 (22.3%) were 65 years old and over. The corresponding figures for Crawley were 23,748 (23.8%), 61,338 (61.5%) and 14,658 (14.7%), indicating that West Green has an older age profile.

== Services ==
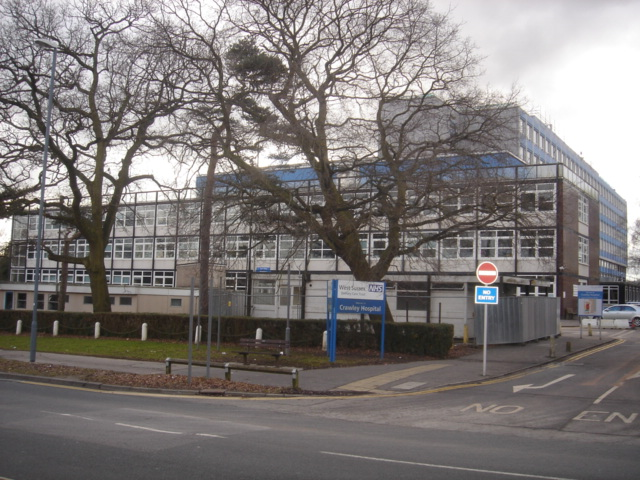
Crawley Hospital

Crawley Hospital was built on a site in West Green Drive between 1959 and 1962. It was extended in the late 1960s and in 1981. It replaced a 1930s building which had in turn succeeded a small cottage hospital at the south end of Crawley High Street. Since the 1990s many services have been moved to East Surrey Hospital in Redhill, and Crawley Hospital now has "sub-acute" status and has 143 beds. Crawley's ambulance station was moved to playing fields off Ifield Avenue by the early 1980s from its former town-centre location. Crawley fire station, headquarters of the Crawley and Mid Sussex District Team of West Sussex Fire and Rescue Service, is on the same road. The station has five vehicle bays with three standard water tenders, a heavy rescue tender and a four-wheel drive appliance. It received 1,390 calls in the 2009–10 reporting year.

The town's main cemetery, which existed before the New town was planned, is in the far southwest corner of West Green, between the bypass and the railway line.

== Public buildings ==
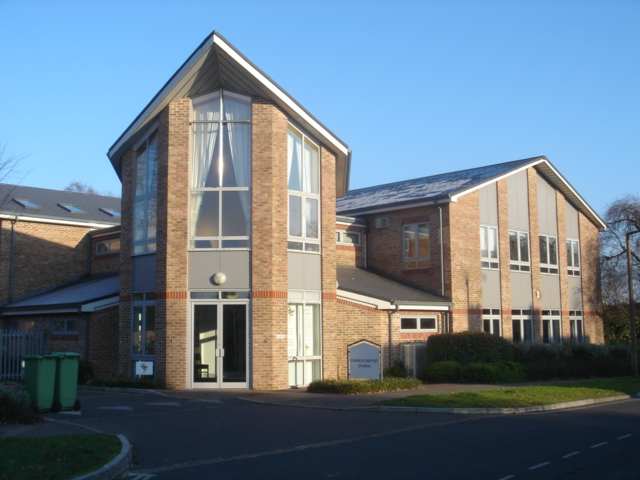
Crawley Baptist Church

Until the early 20th century, West Green was in the Parish of Ifield. Its Anglican parish church, St Margaret's, was distant from the community; so in 1880 a chapel of ease, St Mary Magdalene's, was built. This was replaced by a larger church, St Peter's, in 1892. This was given its own parish in 1901: the Parish of West Crawley was created from territory moved from Ifield. St Peter's Church was designed by W. Hilton Nash and built by local construction firm owner Richard Cook. The sandstone building, with a chancel, single-aisled nave, vestry and bell-turret, holds 439 people and cost £2,800 (£307,600 as of 2009) to build. It was for many years a part of the Parish of Crawley under St John the Baptist's Church. On 8 September 2017 St Peter's became the parish church of the newly created Parish of West Green St Peter.

Crawley Baptist Church, established in 1883, moved to Crabtree Road in West Green in 1954. The building was demolished in 2002 and replaced with a new structure on the same site. Crawley's Hindu community established a mandir (temple) on Spencers Road in about 1970; and the Sikh community have a gurdwara on the same street, which in 2009 was due to be demolished and replaced with a larger building. No work has taken place as of 2025.

A Church of England school was opened on West Green Drive in the 1930s. In 1951, the Local Education Authority set up a temporary school on the site in response to the early growth of the New Town, and permanent infant and junior school divisions were opened in 1952 and 1953 respectively. Under the name of West Green Primary School, the school now has seven classes of pupils between the ages of 4 and 11.

The master plan proposed that a neighbourhood centre, consisting of community centre, public house, school, church and shopping parade, should be an integral part of each neighbourhood. The Development Corporation provided a temporary community centre building, and West Sussex County Council extended the school building in 1954 to provide a permanent facility. This was augmented by a youth centre in 1960. A pub, the Apple Tree, was built in the mid-1950s, and the Development Corporation provided a parade of seven shops: the smallest parade in any of Crawley's neighbourhoods, reflecting its proximity to the town centre.

== Listed buildings ==
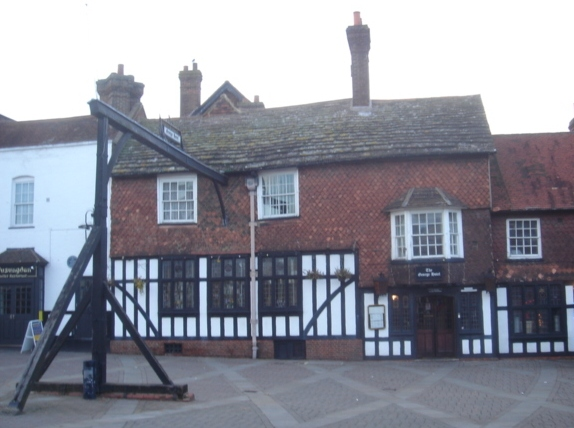
The George Hotel

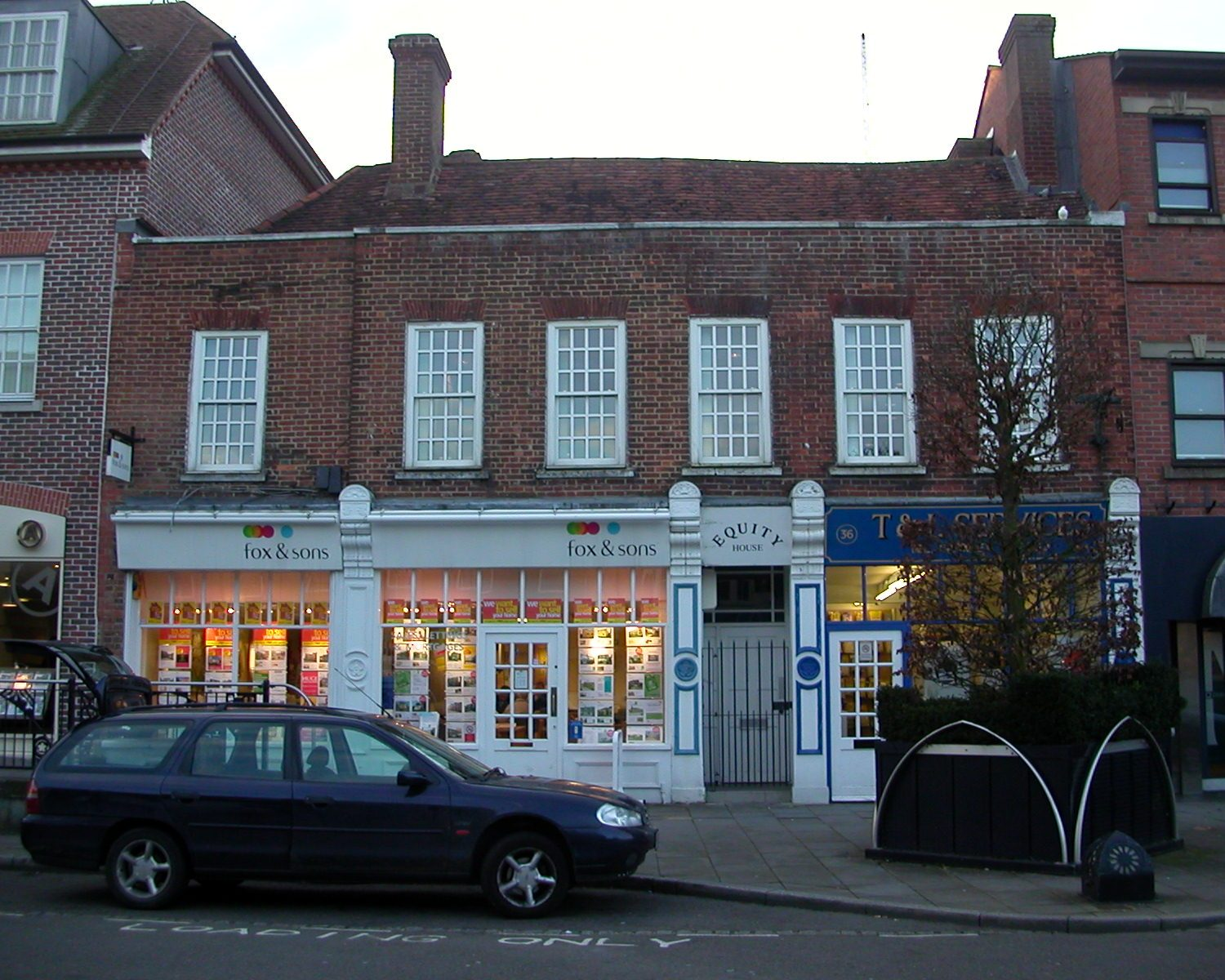
34–36 High Street

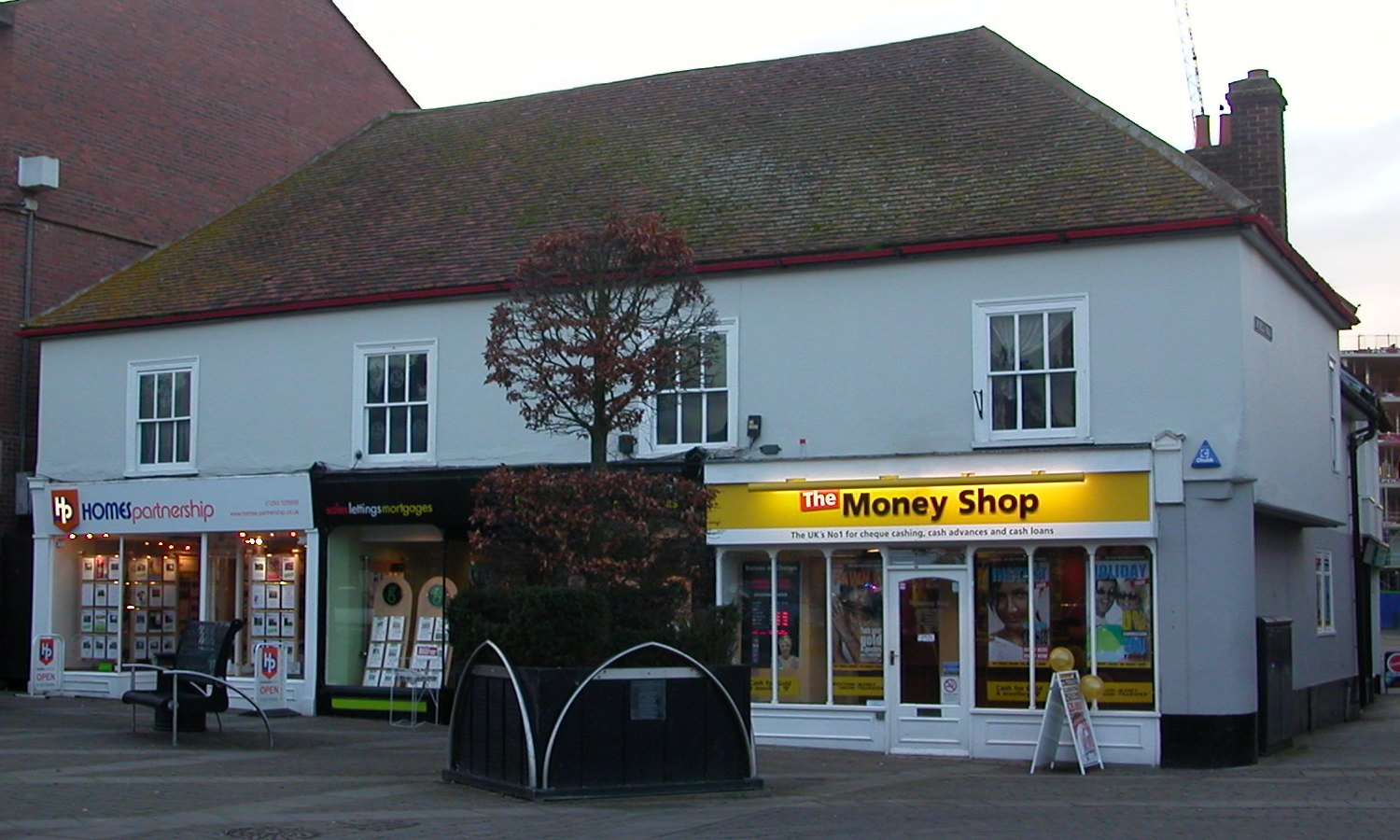
44–48 High Street

The boundary between the West Green and Northgate neighbourhoods follows the ancient parish boundary between the Parishes of Ifield and Crawley. This ran up the middle of the High Street, so all buildings on its west side are within West Green. There are five listed buildings in the neighbourhood.

The George Hotel, listed at Grade II*, is an early 16th-century coaching inn which expanded over the next two centuries to take over surrounding buildings. Crawley's location midway between London and Brighton on the direct route between them, which was turnpiked in 1770, contributed to its growth, as it became the natural stopping place for traffic of all types. Extensive changes in the next two centuries included various extensions and the building of an annexe (since demolished) in the middle of the High Street.

The other four listed buildings have a Grade II designation. The building now designated as 34 and 36 High Street is a two-storey, red-brick building dating from the late 18th century, with six sash windows, a pair of original brick chimneys and a tiled roof. The ground floor has been converted into two retail units. Further north, 44–48 High Street, on the corner of Ifield Road, is a group of three shop units housed in a building originally constructed as a four-bay timber-framed house in about 1600. The exterior is now stuccoed, and the building was redesigned in the 18th and 19th centuries, when it was converted into shops. There are four equally spaced 19th-century sash windows on the side facing the High Street. The north face, fronting Ifield Road, has a jettied overhang, a traditional feature of timber-framed buildings in the area; the main (east) side was originally jettied as well but has since been built up. The oldest visible parts of the building are the southernmost bay, where there is 17th-century brickwork and timber, and the chimney from the same period. Many early 18th-century fittings remain inside. On Ifield Road itself, a now-derelict house at No. 10 is a mid-17th-century timber-framed house with exterior tile-hanging and 19th-century brickwork; and No. 60 and 62 were a pair of cottages created in the 19th century from a 16th-century timber-framed farmhouse, which is now used as one building again. Its exterior is partly of brick and partly tile-hung, the roof is tiled, and substantial wooden beams and trusses are visible inside.

== Transport ==
Metrobus, which operates all local bus services in Crawley, serves Crawley Hospital and other stops in West Green on routes 1 and 2. There is also a free service from Crawley bus station to the Asda superstore, operated by Compass Travel. Crawley railway station is near the southeastern corner of the neighbourhood, and Ifield railway station is close to the west side.

Levels of vehicle ownership, as measured by the 2001 census, are lower than in Crawley as a whole. At the census date, the mean number of vehicles per household was 0.97 (the overall Crawley figure was 1.21), and 32.4% of households had no transport of their own, compared to 20.4% in Crawley overall.
