= St Nicholas Church, Worth =

Coordinates: 51.1103°N 0.1416°W

Parish Church of St. Nicholas
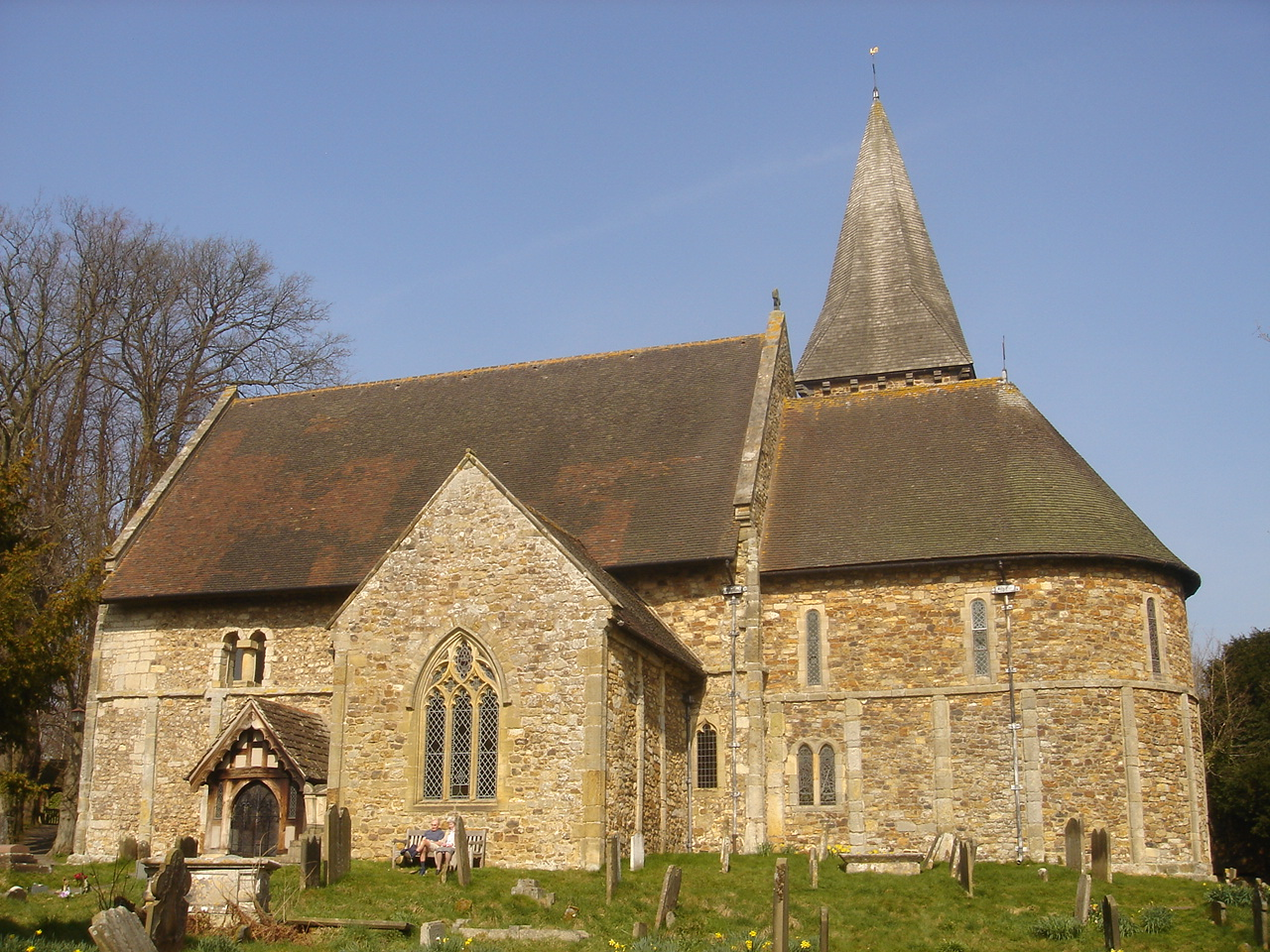
- Parish Church of St. Nicholas
- Location: Worth, West Sussex
- Country: England
- Denomination: Church of England

Architecture
- Functional status: Active
- Heritage designation: Grade I listed

Administration
- Diocese: Chichester
- Archdeaconry: Horsham
- Parish: Worth, Pound Hill and Maidenbower

Clergy
- Rector: Fr Michael Boag

St Nicholas Church is a Church of England parish church in Worth, a village in Crawley, England, which at one time had the largest geographical parish in England.

== History ==
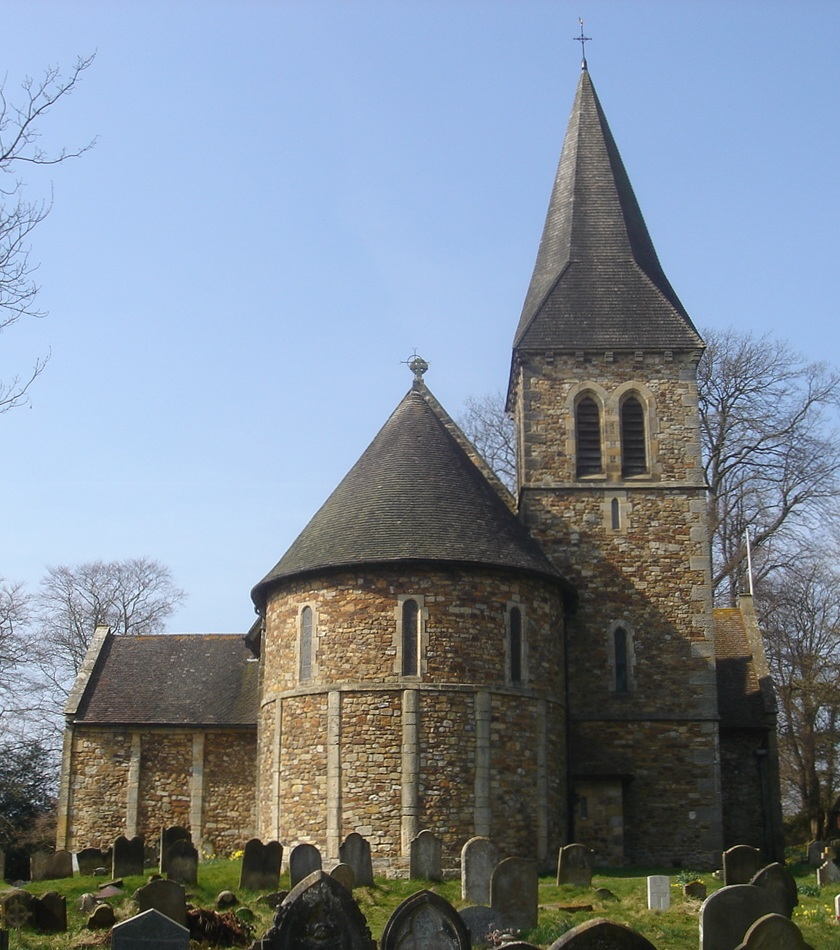
East end, showing apse and tower

St Nicholas Church is one of the oldest churches in the country and has been a place of Christian worship and devotion for well over 1000 years. It is known that the church is of Anglo-Saxon origin, and parts of it have been dated to between AD 950 and 1050, in particular the chancel arch and apse. It was built in what, at the time, was a forest. The reason for building a church here is unknown, but it is surmised that the area would have had good hunting grounds and royal or noble visitors to the grounds would need a place to pray in comfort. As it was a large church isolated in the forest, it is unlikely it was just for local needs. After the Norman Conquest of England in 1066, William the Conqueror gave the church to his son-in-law William de Warenne, whose coat of arms is still visible in the stained glass windows of the church. In the 14th century, the church was passed from the de Warrenne family to the Fitzalan family, who lost it in 1415 to Nevills, Earl of Abergavenny.

=== Bell-ringing ===
Records of bell-ringing here go back to 1684, and bell-ringing still remains part of the weekly routine.

The current tower, with its broached and shingled spire, was added in 1871 by Anthony Salvin to replace an earlier building which rested on tree trunks. A note from 1684 reveals that the church had 3 bells but an additional one was then added. The bells were re-cast in 1844 to form a peal of 6 and then again, by Gillett and Johnston of Croydon, in 1928. Since 1928, only routine maintenance was needed until 1997, when major work on the bells was carried out. Pulleys, wheels and clappers were removed and taken to the foundry for refurbishment, they were then refitted and the bells rehung. The bells are still hung in the oak frame dating from the 1844 installation, which sits on the belfry floor 1.5 m (5 ft)above the ringers' heads but this was strengthened in 1997. The largest bell, the tenor, is 91 cm (3 ft) in diameter and weighs 489 kg (9cwt 2qrts and 14 lbs). Its note is A, the whole ring being harmonically tuned in the key of A. The total weight of bells in the tower is over 36cwt.

== Restoration ==
In 1986 workmen were treating roof timbers of the church for protection against vermin when a fire broke out. The fire brigade quickly put out the blaze, saving the main building, but the roof timbers were severely damaged. This rendered the building unstable, however, which resulted in much scaffolding being put up, which in turn required pews and flooring to be removed. The roof was redesigned and the walls were strengthened. New floors and pews were fitted. The new pews, unlike the pre-restoration ones, are easier to move, giving the church more flexibility. The old pews were considered impossible to re-install in the church. The restoration cost about £510,000 and was complete by 1988. It was during the extensive renovation work that archaeologists were able to confirm the dating of the church's original construction.

== The church today ==
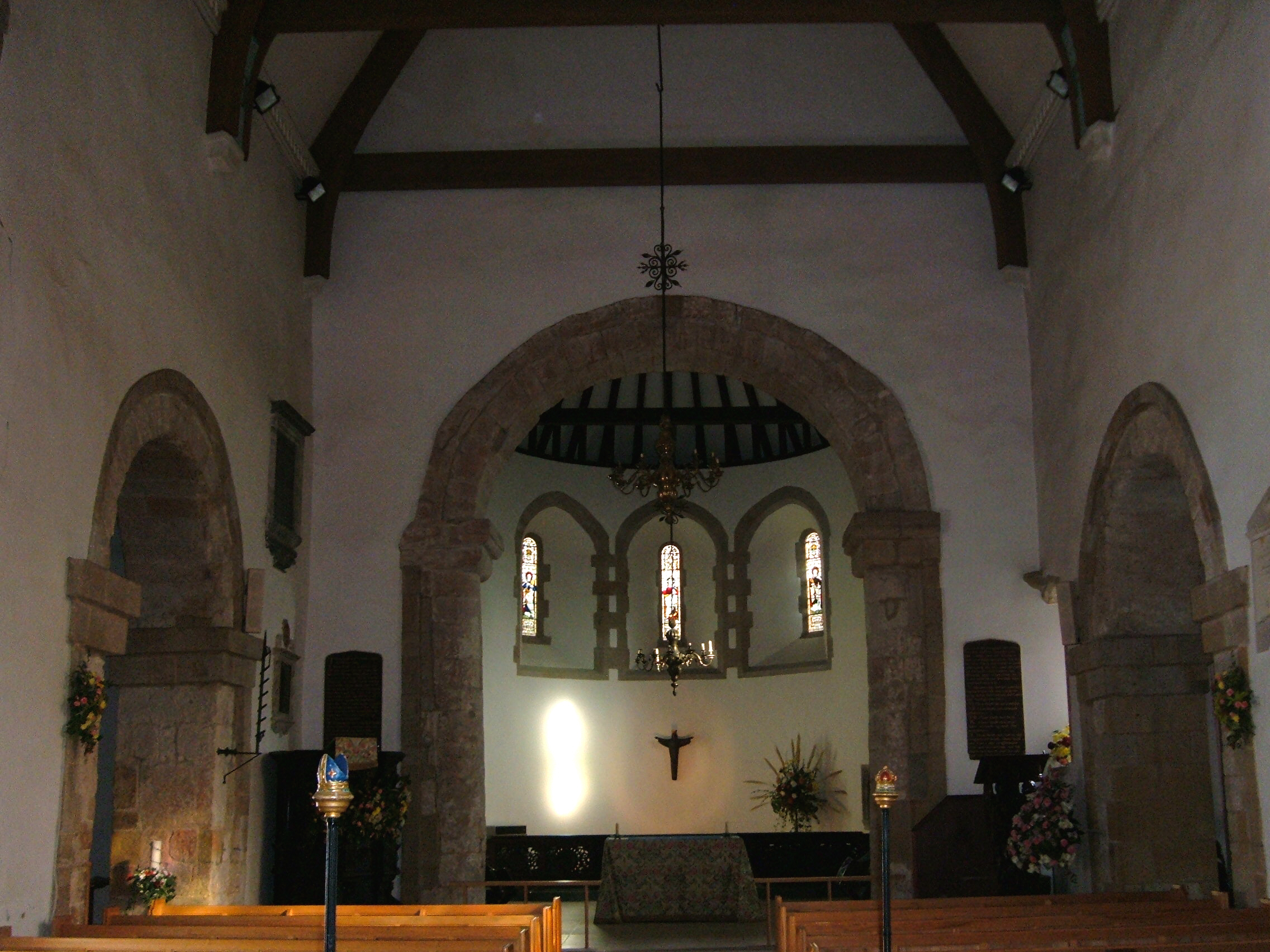
Interior, looking east towards the apsidal chancel

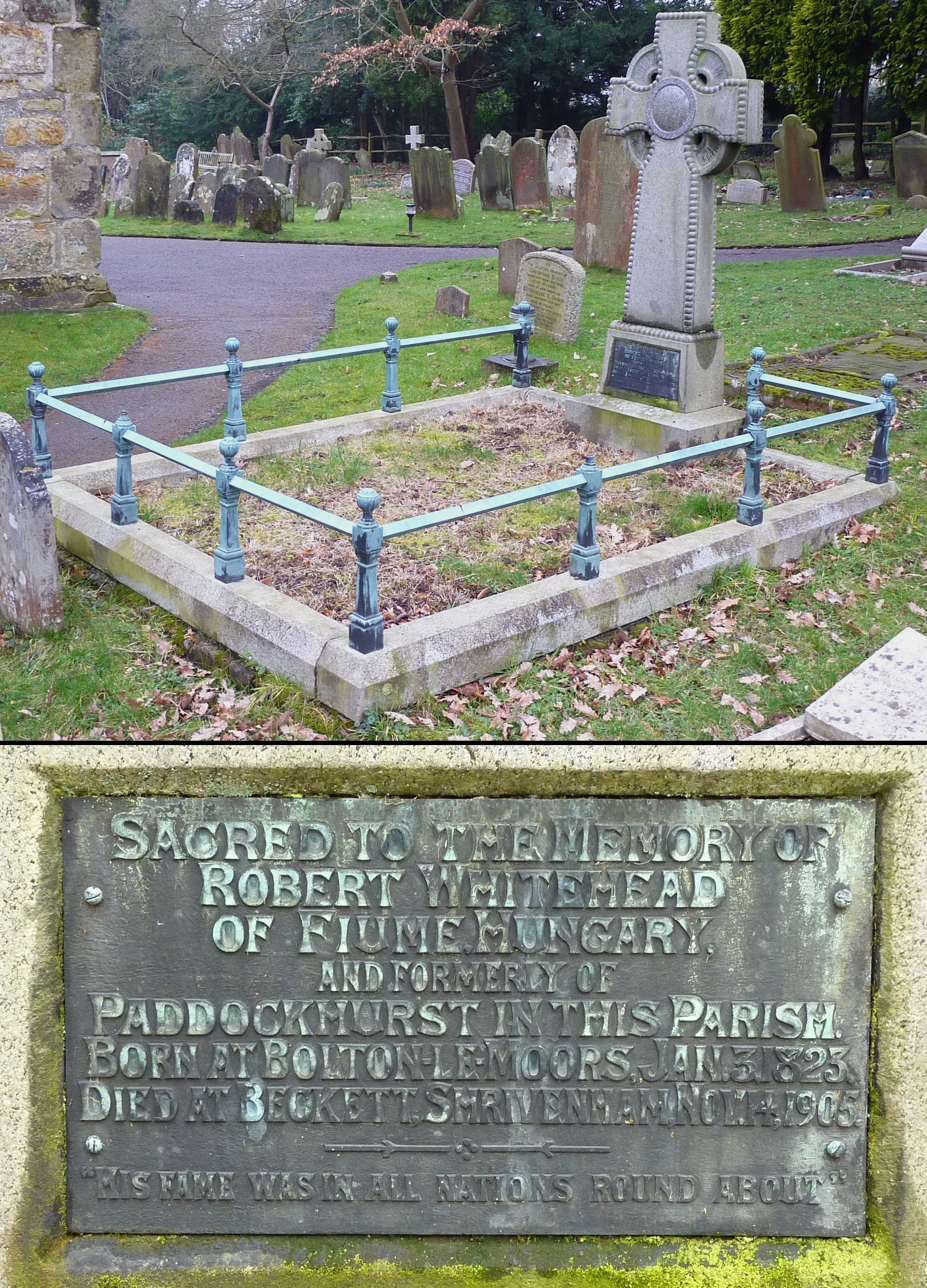
The grave of Robert Whitehead at St Nicholas Church, pictured in 2013

Worth Church is still in use as a parish church today, - and is thought to be the oldest church in continuous use in the country. It has at least two services each Sunday (usually 8am and 10am) and a midweek Eucharist on Thursdays at 10.30am. It has a band of bellringers and a church choir.

The churchyard includes the grave of Robert Whitehead, inventor of the modern torpedo. In a plot bordered with blue railings, his epitaph reads "His fame was known by all nations hereabouts". Also in the churchyard are the Commonwealth war graves of four British Army soldiers and a Royal Navy officer of World War I and a British Army officer and an Indian Army officer of World War II.

== See also ==
- Grade I listed buildings in West Sussex
- List of places of worship in Crawley
- Listed buildings in Crawley
- List of church restorations and alterations by Anthony Salvin

== Sources and further reading ==
- Nairn, Ian; Pevsner, Nikolaus (1965). Sussex. The Buildings of England. Harmondsworth: Penguin Books. pp. 641–642. ISBN 0-14-071028-0.
- Salzman, L. F., ed. (1940). A History of the County of Sussex, Volume 7: The rape of Lewes. Victoria County History. pp. 192–200.
- Wakelin, Roy (1988). Worth Church, Sussex. Crawley: Worth Publishing. pp. not cited. ISBN 0-9513451-0-9.
