= Langley Green, West Sussex =

Area of Crawley, England

Coordinates: 51.1317°N 0.1911°W

Langley Green
- Location within West Sussex
- OS grid reference: TQ265385
- District: Crawley
- Shire county: West Sussex
- Region: South East
- Country: England
- Sovereign state: United Kingdom
- Post town: CRAWLEY
- Postcode district: RH11
- Dialling code: 01293
- Police: Sussex
- Fire: West Sussex
- Ambulance: South East Coast
- UK Parliament: Crawley

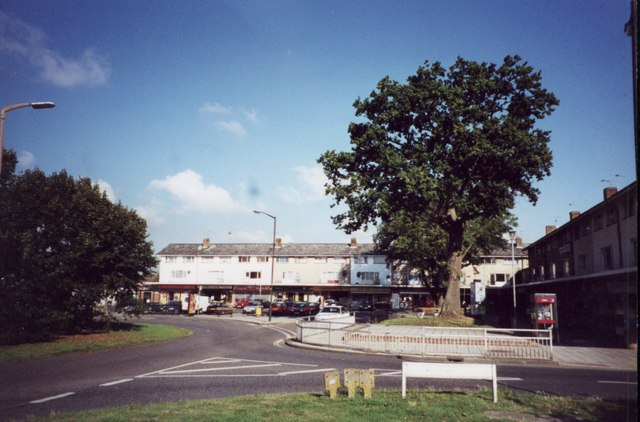
The shopping parade in 2001

Langley Green is a one of 14 neighbourhoods within the town of Crawley in West Sussex, England. Langley Green is in the north-west of the town and is bordered by Manor Royal to the east, Northgate to the south east, West Green to the south across the ring road and Ifield to the west. The main streets running through the community are Stagelands, Martyrs Avenue and Langley Drive. Many of the streets are named after trees and plants (Honeysuckle Lane, Hawthorn Close) animals (Hare Lane, Fox Close) or birds (Jackdaw Close, Swallow Road, Raven Lane). A small shopping parade, St Leonards Church, The Dr. Johnson Pub and Langley Green Primary School formed the centre of the community.

== History ==
=== 20th century ===
Work started on Langley Green in the early 1950s with workers being brought down from London by train and living in huts on site. After nine months workers were entitled to a council house, and many of the early population of Langley Green were builders by profession. As Langley Green was within walking distance of the new factory estate, many of the factory workers brought down from London with firms such as APV settled here. Houses in Langley Green ranged from two to four bedrooms, with a small number of flats and bungalows. Heating was by coal, with the coal being stored under the staircase. In some houses water was also heated by solid fuel burners. Many of Langley Green's residents became private house holders in the 1980s when the Margaret Thatcher government had a policy of selling council houses to tenants. Over the years virtually every house on the estate had been improved. The addition of central heating has been almost universal. Other common improvements include double glazing, insulation of walls and roofs and removal of walls and doors to create bigger rooms.

=== Today ===
Today the small neighbourhood is one of the most multi cultural in Crawley and has a lively and friendly community. There were few ethnic-minority families living in Langley Green before the late 1960s. The first families tended to buy their own property and as these were limited at the time, the new immigrants concentrated in areas around Denchers Plat and Beckett Lane. Langley Green is now home to the Crawley Islamic Centre and Mosque.

Two of the neighbourhood's most notable residents were Roy Whiting and boxer Alan Minter. In 1972 he won an Olympic bronze medal and went on to become world middleweight champion. Whiting, who was born locally in 1959, was convicted of one of the most high-profile murder cases in Britain in modern times in December 2001; the murder of Sarah Payne, who went missing in Littlehampton on the West Sussex coast on 1 July 2000 and whose body was found near Pulborough 16 days later.

Gatwick Airport is also within the Langley Green Area and provides another important source of employment.
