= Manor Royal =

Industrial area of Crawley, West Sussex, England

Coordinates: 51.13181°N 0.19347°W

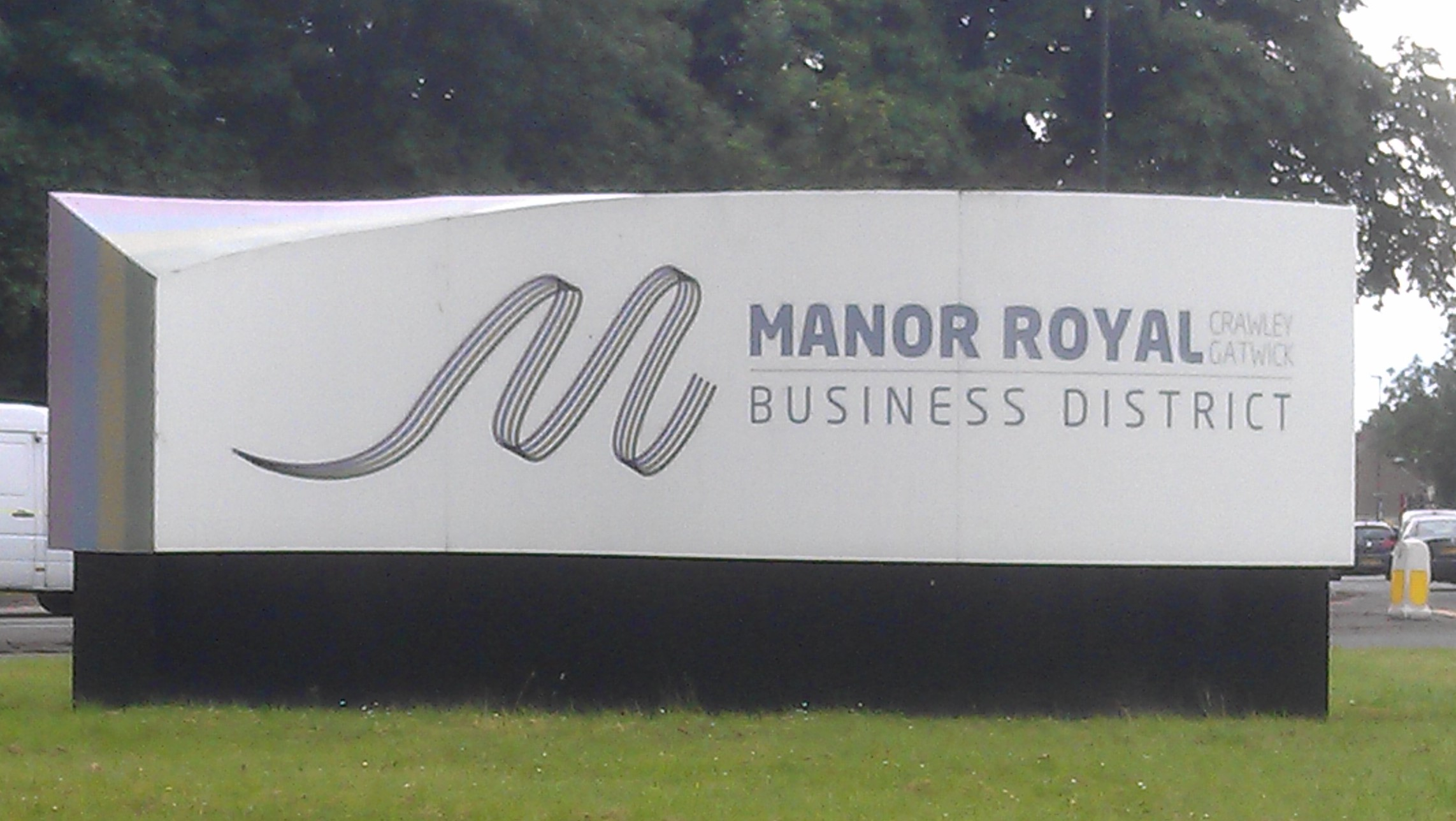

- Location within West Sussex
- OS grid reference: TQ265385
- District: Crawley
- Shire county: West Sussex
- Region: South East
- Country: England
- Sovereign state: United Kingdom
- Post town: Crawley
- Postcode district: RH10
- Dialling code: 01293
- Police: Sussex
- Fire: West Sussex
- Ambulance: South East Coast

Manor Royal is an industrial zone within the town of Crawley in West Sussex, England. Manor Royal is in the north of the town near to Gatwick Airport. The area is devoted to light industry and offices and was designed for industry as part of the Crawley new town project. Manor Royal was officially named and opened by Princess Elizabeth (later Queen Elizabeth II) on 25 January 1950.

It is bordered by Northgate and Three Bridges to the south, Langley Green to the west, Gatwick Airport to the north and the Brighton Main Line to the east. The area falls largely within the local government ward of Northgate.

Major companies with offices and factories in Manor Royal include:

- ABB
- Acron Aviation
- Amey
- B&CE
- Boeing Flight Services
- British Airways Holidays
- BOC
- Camelot Chilled Foods
- CGG
- Doosan Power Systems
- Elekta
- ERGOS Technologies Limited
- G4S
- Grant Thornton
- Invensys APV / Invensys Foxboro
- Jeppesen
- Metrobus
- National Federation of Builders
- Ocado
- Oxford Aviation Academy
- Suzuki GB
- Thales
- TUI Travel
- Unilever
- Varian Medical Systems
- Vent-Axia
- Virgin Atlantic

Manor Royal is served by the Crawley Fastway 24-hour bus service, providing regular services to Gatwick Airport, Crawley and Three Bridges stations, as well as many other local areas.
