= Worth, West Sussex =

Parish in West Sussex, England

Coordinates: 51.11301°N 0.14698°W

Worth
- Location within West Sussex
- Area: 19.95 km^{2} (7.70 sq mi)
- Population: 9,888 2001 Census; 10,378 (2011 Census)
  - Density: 496/km^{2} (1,280/sq mi)
- OS grid reference: TQ298364
  - London: 27 miles (43 km) N
- Civil parish: Worth
- District: Mid Sussex; Crawley
- Shire county: West Sussex
- Region: South East
- Country: England
- Sovereign state: United Kingdom
- Post town: CRAWLEY
- Postcode district: RH10
- Dialling code: 01293
- Police: Sussex
- Fire: West Sussex
- Ambulance: South East Coast
- UK Parliament: Crawley
- Website: http://worth-pc.gov.uk/

Worth is either a civil parish in the Mid Sussex District of West Sussex, or a distinct but historically related village in Crawley.

== Civil parish ==
Worth is a civil parish in the Mid Sussex District of West Sussex, a county in southeast England. It includes the villages of Copthorne and Crawley Down, and covers an area of 1,995 hectares (4,930 acres). The population at the time of the 2001 census was 9,888. In the 2011 census it had increased to 10,378.

The parish of Worth was one of the larger West Sussex parishes, encompassing the entire area along the West Sussex/Surrey border between the town of Crawley, east of its High Street, and East Grinstead. The creation of Turners Hill civil parish brought Worth to a third of its original size.

Despite their names, neither Worth Abbey, an English Benedictine monastery, nor Worth School are located in the modern Worth civil parish. They are in what is now Turners Hill civil parish.

== Village ==
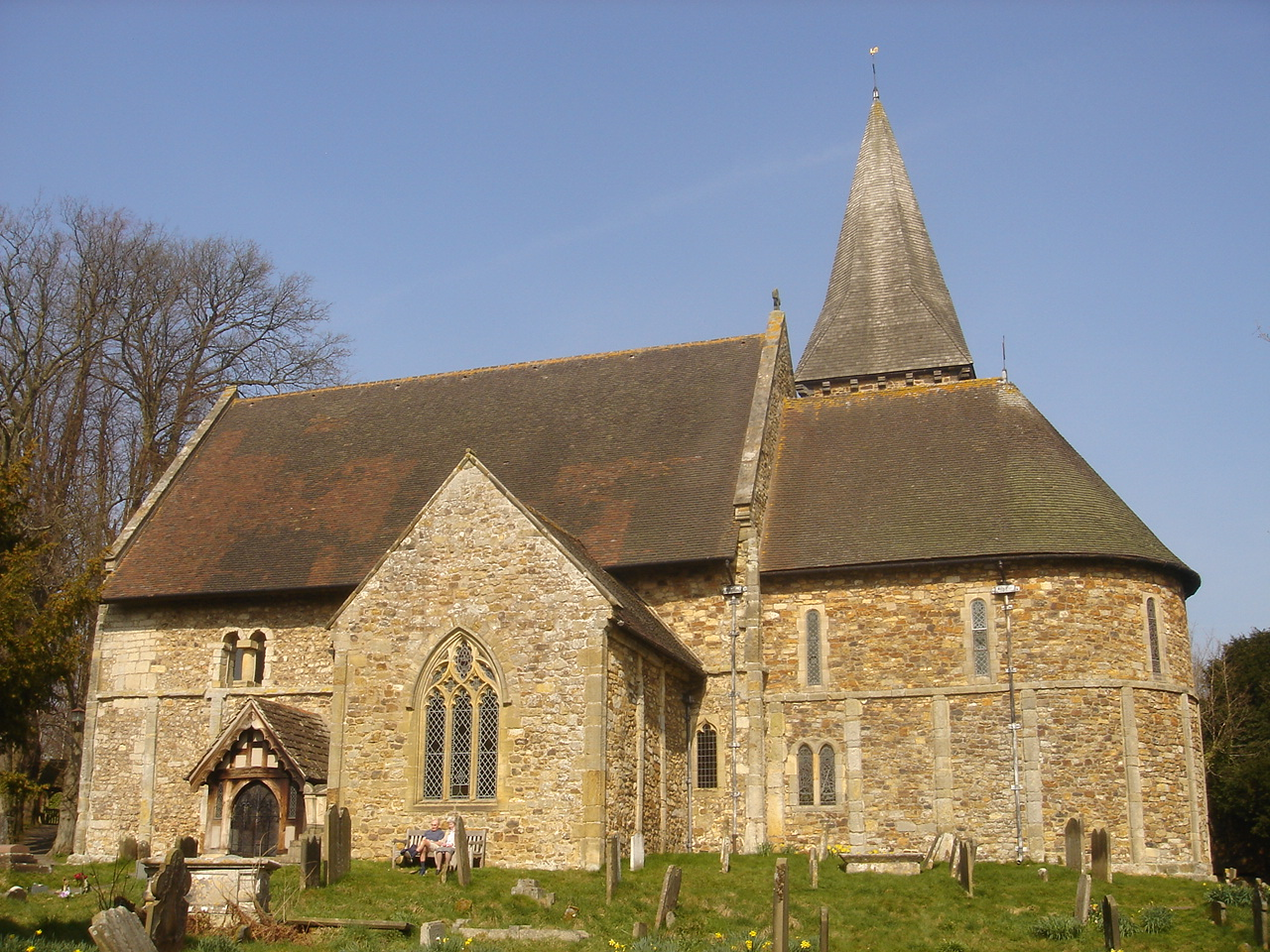
St Nicholas' Church, the ancient parish church of Worth, has Saxon origins.

Worth village is now an area within the neighbourhood of Pound Hill in the borough of Crawley. It was formerly a separate village, and its name is still used for the civil parish in which it was originally situated.

Worth village has Saxon origins: Worth Church still retains its Saxon floor plan. The Wealden iron industry flourished here in the 17th and 18th centuries. The coming of the railway in 1855 brought more employment to the area, but the line closed in 1967.

The place appears under Surrey in the Domesday book, with the old spelling "Orðe" (pronounced with a silent initial 'w' as in 'one', and including the Saxon letter 'ð' which sounds a soft 'th'. The Domesday book's entries for Sussex, by comparison, list Worthing as "Ordinges" and Petworth as "Peteorde").

With the creation of Crawley New Town, Worth village became part of it, in the Pound Hill ward; the title of the ward was changed in 2004 to Pound Hill South and Worth. It is common for signposts to be altered to use the Worth name instead of Pound Hill by local residents.

The ecclesiastical parish, part of the Diocese of Chichester, maintains the distinction, and is formally entitled "The Parish of Worth, Maidenbower and Pound Hill."

Worth Park House, a large country house, once stood on the Milton Mount housing estate, now part of Pound Hill, Crawley. The house was home to Sir Joseph Montefiore and his family. The gardens have recently been restored.

== Notable Parish Register ==
The 1654-1751 parish register for Worth is notable for recording the burials of unbaptized infants. This gives a much fuller picture of the rate of new born deaths than is usually visible in records of the time.
