= Friary Church of St Francis and St Anthony, Crawley =

St Francis and St Anthony Church
- Friary Church of St Francis and St Anthony
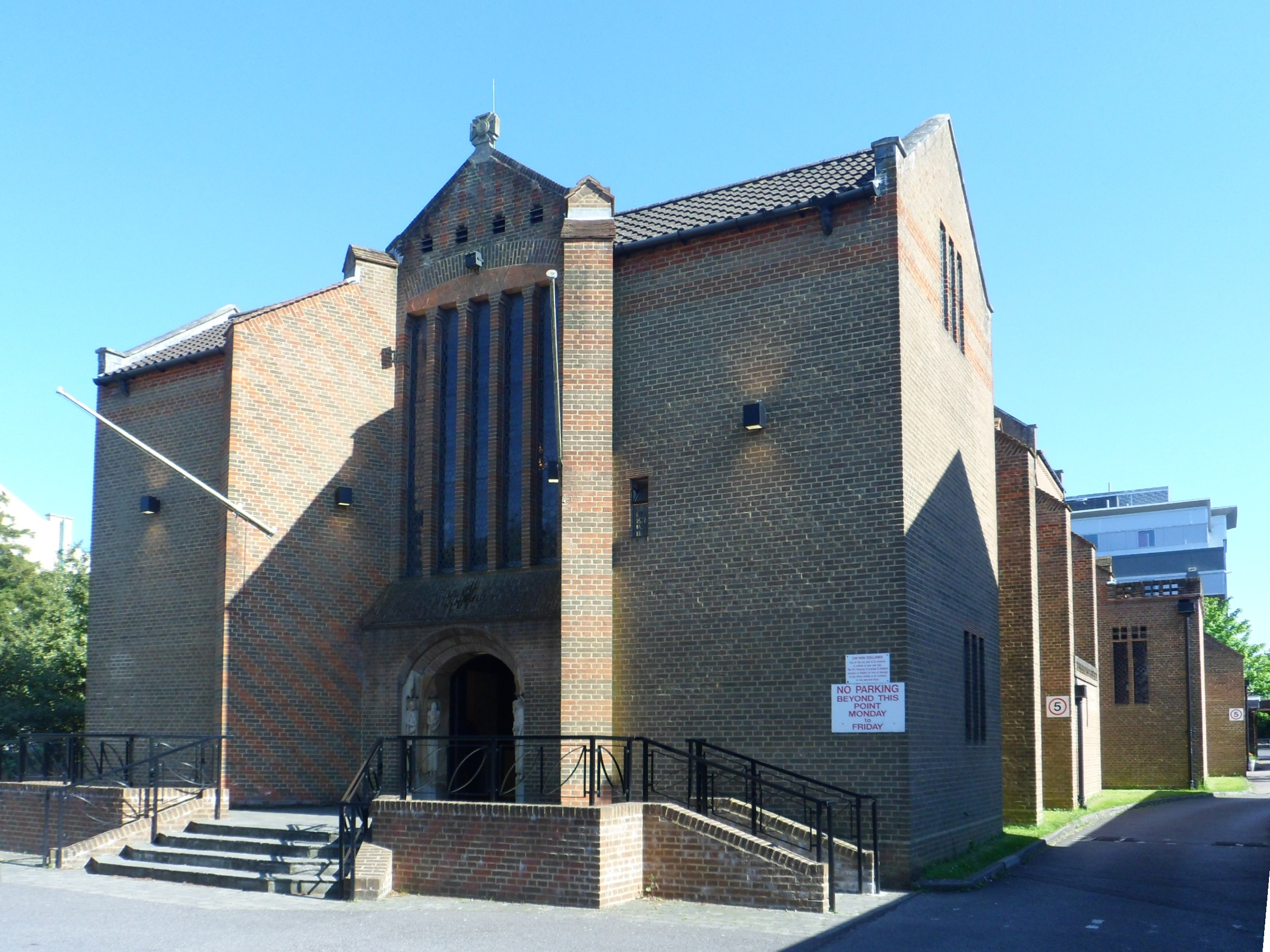
- The church from the north–northwest in June 2013
- St Francis and St Anthony Church
- 51.1133°N 0.1878°W
- Location: Haslett Avenue West, Crawley, West Sussex RH10 1HR
- Country: England
- Denomination: Roman Catholic
- Website: http://crawleycatholic.church/

History
- Status: Parish church
- Founded: 12 October 1861
- Founder: Francis Scawen Blunt
- Dedication: Francis of Assisi and Anthony of Padua
- Dedicated: 1861 (original church)

Architecture
- Functional status: Active
- Heritage designation: Grade II-listed
- Designated: 25 October 2007
- Architect: Harry Stuart Goodhart-Rendel (present church)
- Groundbreaking: 1958 (present church)
- Completed: 18 November 1959 (present church)
- Demolished: 1955 (original church)

Administration
- Province: Southwark
- Archdiocese: Southwark (formerly)
- Diocese: Arundel and Brighton
- Deanery: Crawley
- Parish: Crawley

The Friary Church of St Francis and St Anthony is a Roman Catholic church in Crawley, a town and borough in West Sussex, England. The town's first permanent place of Roman Catholic worship was founded in 1861 next to a friary whose members, from the Order of Friars Minor Capuchin, had been invited to the area by a wealthy local family of Catholic converts. Crawley's transformation from a modest market town to a rapidly growing postwar New Town in the mid-20th century made a larger church necessary, and in the late 1950s the ecclesiastical architect Harry Stuart Goodhart-Rendel was commissioned to build a new church. The friary closed in 1980 and has been demolished, but the large brick church still stands in a commanding position facing the town centre. English Heritage has listed the building at Grade II for its architectural and historical importance.

== History ==
Crawley was founded in the early 13th century as a market town, and a church dedicated to St John the Baptist was founded a century later. The town lay partly in the parish of Ifield, a neighbouring village: the parish boundary ran up the middle of the wide High Street.

After the English Reformation, Anglicanism predominated in the area, Protestant Nonconformity also became well established, and Roman Catholicism was almost unknown. A survey in 1582 found that two inhabitants of Ifield parish were recusants. By the mid-19th century, the centuries-old hostility towards Roman Catholicism held by many Anglicans in Sussex had faded, and conversions from the established Church to Catholicism were becoming more common. Prominent local examples of this included several members of the Blunt family, the wealthy owners of the Crabbet Park estate just outside Crawley.

The Blunts (some members took the spelling Blount) and the Gales had been important members of local society for many generations. Leonard Gale senior moved to the area in the 1640s and became an ironmaster; he built up a large business and owned much land and property, all of which was inherited by his son Leonard junior. He bought the Crabbet Park estate in 1698 with £9,000 (£1,341,000 as of 2025) of his inheritance. He became richer and more influential through the 18th century, despite the decline of the local iron industry, and on his death in 1750 Crabbet Park passed to his youngest daughter Sarah, who by then had married into the Blunt family. Upon her death in 1758 Crabbet Park passed to her widower Samuel Blunt, who later married Winifred Scawen. Their granddaughter, Mary Scawen Blunt, was a friend of the Roman Catholic convert Cardinal John Henry Newman, and converted from Anglicanism to Catholicism herself. Her sons, Francis and Wilfrid, also converted in 1852.

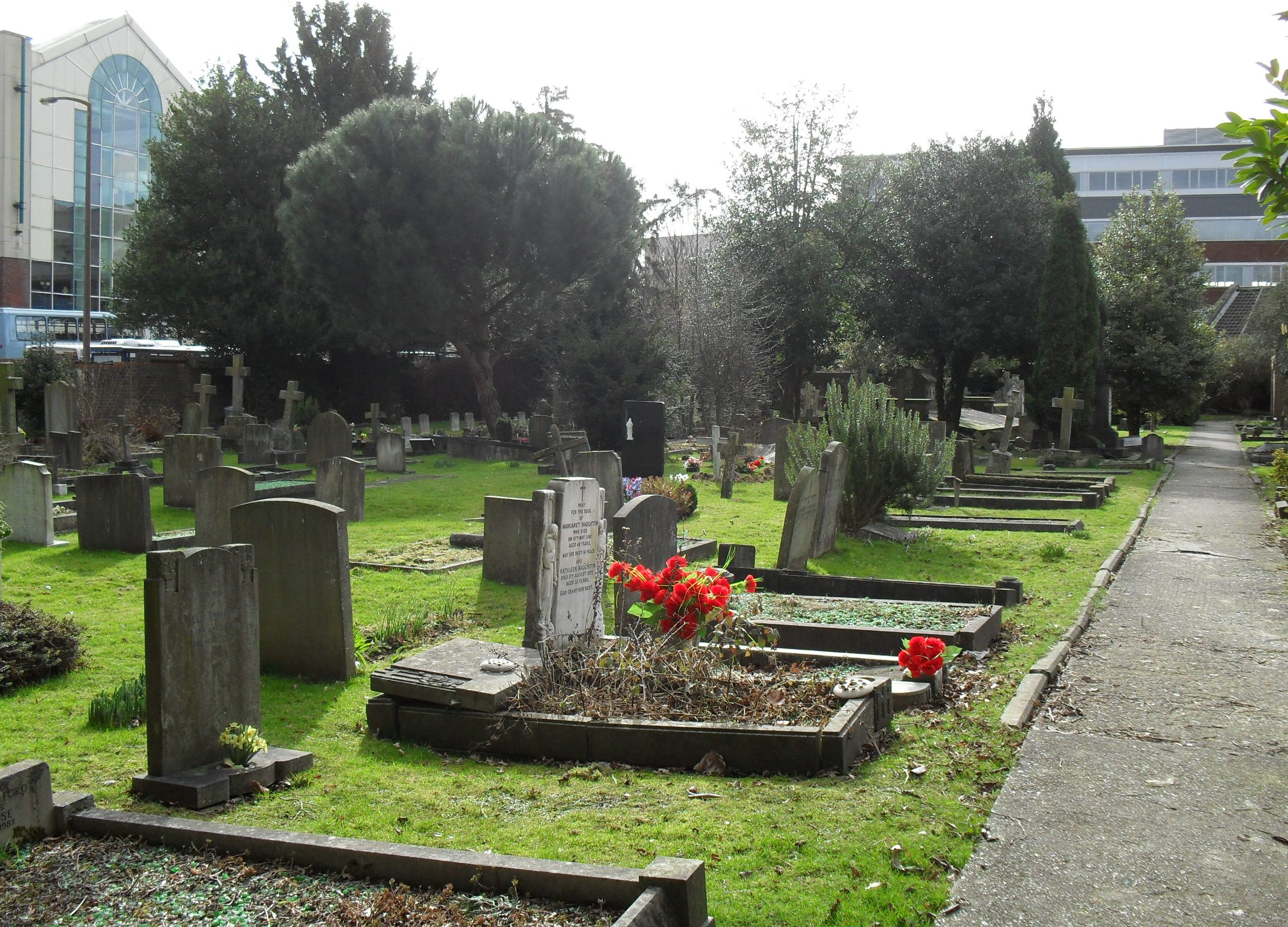
The burial ground seen from the northwest corner

In 1859, at the invitation of a Mrs. Montgomery (a relative of Mary Scawen Blunt), Italian Capuchin friars arrived in Crawley. They stayed at her house on the Horsham Road (in the present-day Gossops Green neighbourhood) and celebrated Mass in its coach-house, which was reordered to make a chapel and dedicated to St Philip. Soon afterwards, Mary Scawen Blunt died; she asked her sons to found a permanent Roman Catholic church to serve Crawley and the surrounding area and a friary for the Capuchins. In 1860, Francis bought 3 acres (1.2 ha) of land near Crawley railway station and the town centre and arranged the design and construction of a friary and adjoining church; the builder was recorded as a Mr Ockendon. The friary formed three sides of a square around a courtyard; the north side was formed by the church, which was dedicated to St Francis. All buildings were in the Early English Gothic style and were built of stone and brick, and the church itself had a bellcote on the roof. The church and friary were dedicated and opened on 12 October 1861.

The church was one of the earliest Roman Catholic places of worship in Sussex, and it served a large area in its early years—as far as the villages of Rudgwick and Nuthurst to the west, Copthorne in the northeast and Lindfield in the southeast. The town of Horsham was also covered. The friars became an important and well-respected part of the Crawley community: they undertook missionary work locally and in other countries, and were often seen around the town in their simple brown robes. Anselm Kenealy, a former friar, became the first Archbishop of the Metropolitan Archdiocese of Simla—the predecessor of the present Roman Catholic Archdiocese of Delhi in India.

On 23 November 1895, the Very Rev. Father Elzear of Risca (Daniel Clement Hanley) founded the Guild of St Anthony of Padua at the church, which became its world headquarters on the instruction of Pope Pius X. The Guardian of the friary established the guild on the 700th anniversary of Anthony of Padua's birth after a portrait in the church was identified as a 15th-century depiction of the saint. It had formed part of Mrs Montgomery's bequest to the church and friary, which included an ornate altar of marble and alabaster and an accompanying altarpiece, both of which came from a chapel in her Italian villa. These, and the portrait, were placed in a side chapel in the church, which became a shrine to St Anthony. On 26 July 1946, at the request of the friars, Pope Pius XII formally rededicated the church to St Francis and St Anthony.

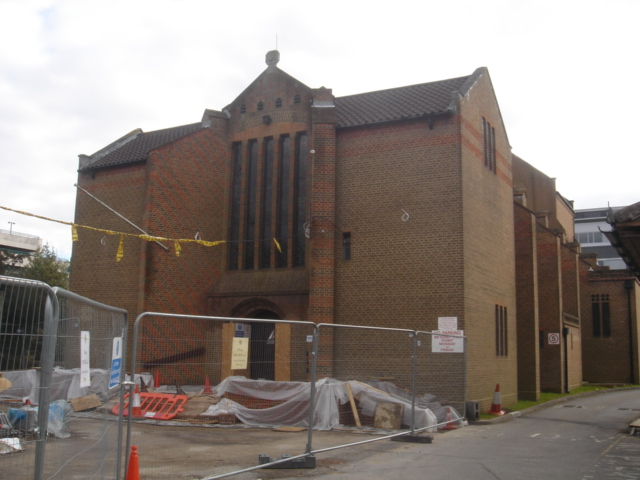
The church undergoing renovation in February 2009

Crawley was designated as a New Town on 9 January 1947 by Lewis Silkin, the Minister of Town and Country Planning in Clement Attlee's postwar Labour Government. The plans included increasing the population of about 9,500 to 50,000 by 1963 by building a series of residential neighbourhoods around an expanded town centre. By 1960, this target population had been exceeded, and plans were underway for further expansion. The friary church was not large enough to cater for the increased number of worshippers, and some structural problems were discovered. Local ecclesiastical architect Harry Stuart Goodhart-Rendel was commissioned to design a new church. On 14 June 1958, the 119th anniversary of Francis Scawen Blunt's birthday, the foundation stone was placed, and two days later demolition of the old church began. The new church was arranged at a right-angle to its predecessor, which allowed old tombs to be incorporated into the building's foundations instead of being destroyed. The sanctuary was built on the site of the old nave. Local construction firm James Longley and Company built the church.

The new building was consecrated and opened on 18 November 1959, the 100th anniversary of the Capuchin friars' arrival in Crawley. The friars left the town in 1980 and moved to Canterbury, after which the church was no longer the headquarters of the Guild of St Anthony.

The friary buildings behind Goodhart-Rendel's church were demolished, but the large adjacent burial ground remains. A 19th-century burial vault for members of the Blunt/Blount family stands alongside the graves of Catherine "Skittles" Walters—Wilfrid Blunt's mistress and the subject of some of his poems—and Lord Alfred Douglas, Oscar Wilde's lover "Bosie", who was buried here in 1945 alongside his mother. Francis Blunt's tomb stands inside a private chapel (the Blunt Chapel) behind the altar, next to that of his sister Alice; both died in 1872. Wilfrid Blunt carved a stone effigy of his brother in friar's robes, which rests on top of the tomb. The burial ground also contains three war graves of an Army Chaplain and Sergeant-Major of World War I and a Royal Army Service Corps Driver of World War II.

An internal reorganisation and rebuilding was carried out in 1988, which opened up the interior and changed the small sanctuary. Another refurbishment took place between October 2008 and March 2009, during which time the church was closed. Architect Deirdre Waddington's work, which cost £750,000, won a Royal Institute of British Architects prize. As well as structural work and improved disabled access, a mural of Pope Benedict XVI's coat of arms was added.

== Architecture ==
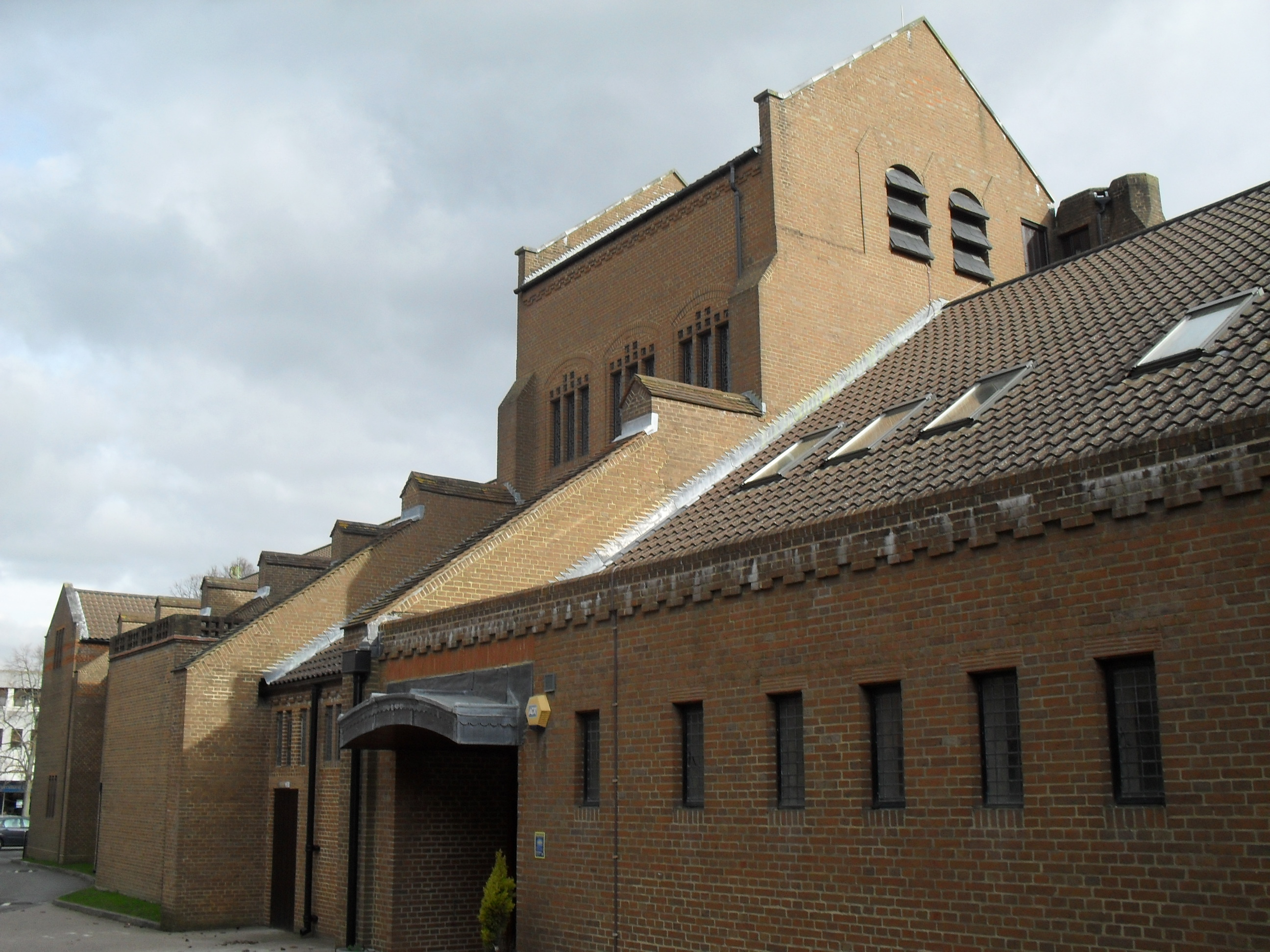
Side view of the church looking northeastwards, showing the tower and polychromatic brickwork

Harry Stuart Goodhart-Rendel was an "eclectic, imaginative and inventive" architect whose designs were rational rather than whimsical, but still had decorative touches and variety. Brick was his favoured building material, and the Friary Church is "instantly recognisable" as one of his designs. Ian Nairn and Nikolaus Pevsner described it as "a composition of oddly assembled parts". The cruciform structure is a large but low-set building of dark greyish brick with some intricately detailed red-brick courses. The roof is laid with pantiles. The main entrance, a round-arched doorway in a slightly recessed bay, sits below five tall, narrow windows with elaborate tracery; the brickwork surrounding these is diapered.

Inside, the ceiling of the long nave is of concrete, painted and laid out in a hexagonal pattern. The nave is flanked by aisles with plain arches, above which runs a tunnel vault. A small, slightly offset tower sits on top of the crossing, which originally had an arch leading through to the nave. This was removed as part of the reordering work in 1988, and a hidden steel structure had to be inserted instead to support it. The shrine to St Anthony of Padua was moved from the old church and is in the south aisle. There is an array of wooden fixtures throughout the church, including screens, galleries and pews, but Goodhart-Rendel's altar and altar rails were lost when the reordering of the sanctuary took place. Part of the painted ceiling was also destroyed by this work. A new altar was obtained from a church in Woking, Surrey, which no longer required it.

== The church today ==
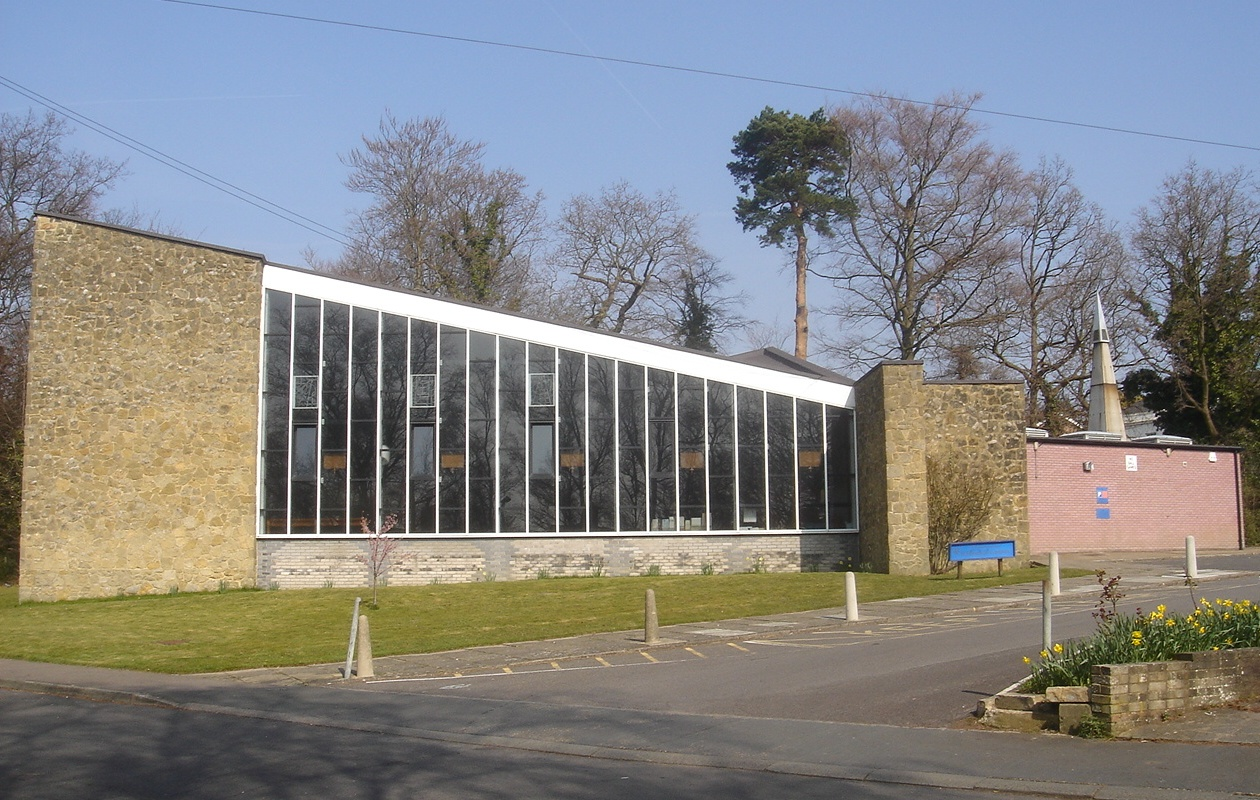
St Edward the Confessor's Church in Pound Hill

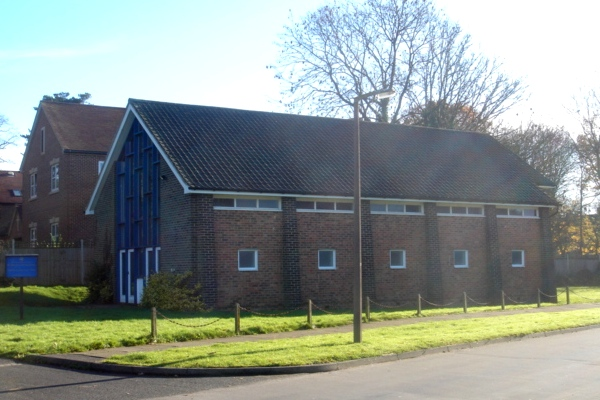
St Theodore of Canterbury Church in Gossops Green

The Friary Church was listed at Grade II by English Heritage on 25 October 2007; this defines it as a "nationally important" building of "special interest". As of February 2001, it was one of 85 Grade II structures, and 100 listed buildings and structures of all grades, in the Borough of Crawley. English Heritage regards it as architecturally important as it is one of the best works by Goodhart-Rendel, an "eminent" ecclesiastical architect, and historically significant both as an "important component of the dramatic expansion of the town in the mid-20th century" and as a piece of postwar planning.

The five other Roman Catholic churches in Crawley are administered centrally from the Friary Church, which is the headquarters of Crawley parish. The regular expansion of the town from the 1950s to the 1980s, which saw new neighbourhoods being planned and built around the core of the old town every few years, increased the demand for additional churches. The first of these was the Church of Our Lady Queen of Heaven in Langley Green, the most northwesterly neighbourhood. Crawley New Town's Development Corporation provided land for the concrete and brick structure, which opened in 1959. Three years later, St Bernadette's Church was built in Tilgate, in the south of the town, and in 1965 St Edward the Confessor's Church was provided in Pound Hill, to the east. The latter, by architect Alexander Lane, is of reinforced concrete with pale brick and large areas of glass. The development of the Gossops Green neighbourhood on the southwestern side prompted the construction of St Theodore of Canterbury's Church in 1971; the cruck-framed, brick-walled structure with tall brick buttresses has a stone carving of the saint on the exterior. In 1982, the Church of Christ the Lord in Broadfield, another southwestern neighbourhood, was licensed for Roman Catholic worship; originally an Anglican church when built in 1980, it became a multi-denominational place of worship for the two faiths and for followers of the United Reformed Church. A convent chapel in nearby Copthorne, demolished in 2009, was also included within the parish.

Four Sunday Masses are celebrated at the Friary Church: the First Mass of Sunday takes place on the preceding Saturday evening, and there are two morning services and one in the evening on Sunday. Two Masses are said on Holy Days of Obligation. There is also a daily Mass, and Confession is heard weekly.

St Francis of Assisi Primary School, which opened in 1950 and relocated to the Southgate neighbourhood in 1956, and the nearby St Wilfrid's Catholic School, which opened in 1952 and became a comprehensive secondary school in 1967, are associated with the church.

== See also ==
- List of places of worship in Crawley
- Listed buildings in Crawley

== Bibliography ==
- Bastable, Roger (1983). Crawley: A Pictorial History. Chichester: Phillimore & Co. ISBN 0-85033-503-5.
- Bastable, Roger (1986). Crawley: The Making of a New Town. Chichester: Phillimore & Co. ISBN 0-85033-613-9.
- Elleray, D. Robert (2004). Sussex Places of Worship. Worthing: Optimus Books. ISBN 0-9533132-7-1.
- Gwynne, Peter (1990). A History of Crawley (1st ed.). Chichester: Phillimore & Co. ISBN 0-85033-718-6.
- Lowerson, John (1980). Crawley: Victorian New Town. Falmer: University of Sussex, Centre for Continuing Education. ISBN 0-904242-14-5.
- Nairn, Ian; Pevsner, Nikolaus (1965). The Buildings of England: Sussex. Harmondsworth: Penguin Books. ISBN 0-14-071028-0.
