= Lowfield Heath =

Coordinates: 51°8′45″N 0°10′47″W

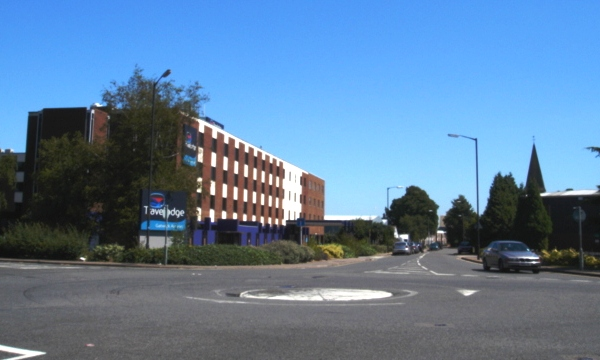
- The village crossroads, looking east along Church Road
- District: Crawley
- Shire county: West Sussex
- Region: South East
- Country: England
- Sovereign state: United Kingdom
- Post town: CRAWLEY
- Postcode district: RH11
- Dialling code: 01293
- Police: Sussex
- Fire: West Sussex
- Ambulance: South East Coast
- UK Parliament: Crawley

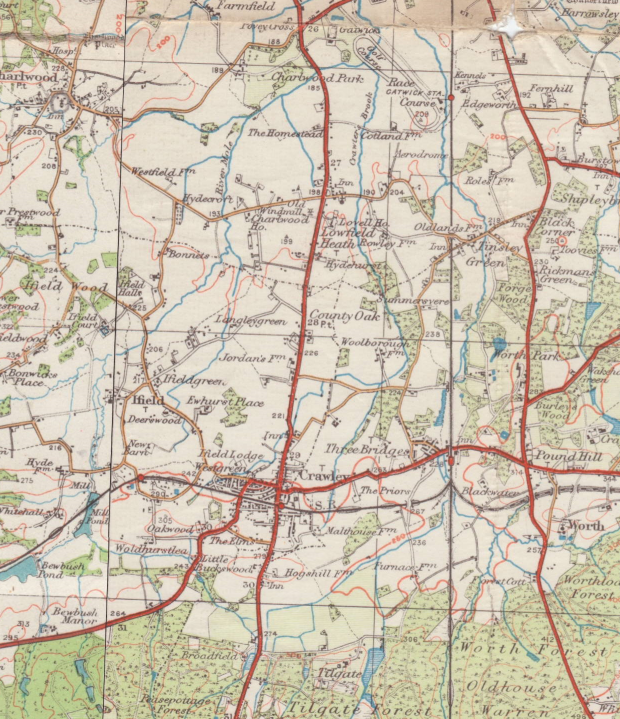
This 1932 map shows the crossroads, inn, church and "Old Windmill"

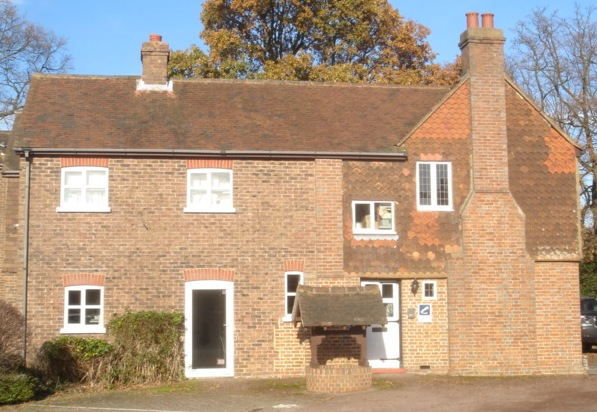
County Oak Cottage; the part built around 1700 is on the right

Lowfield Heath is a former village within the boundaries of the Borough of Crawley, West Sussex, England. Situated on the main London to Brighton road approximately 27 miles (43 km) south of London and 2 miles (3.2 km) north of Crawley, it was gradually rendered uninhabitable by the expansion of London Gatwick Airport immediately to the north.

Houses and village amenities were steadily demolished between the 1950s and the 1970s, and only one original building – St Michael and All Angels Church, built in 1867 – remains, although there are various buildings on the site which serve the airport. The village took its name from an area of heathland of the same name, parts of which still survive, and a few houses and farms away from the old village centre survive and are still described as being in Lowfield Heath. A windmill stood in the area until it was moved to nearby Charlwood in 1987, and is also still referred to as the Lowfield Heath windmill.

== Origins ==
A large area of common land, consisting of heathland on top of Weald Clay, straddled the border between the counties of Surrey and Sussex north of Crawley. An ancient oak tree, the "County Oak", stood on the heath for centuries and marked the traditional boundary. This tree was eventually cut down in the 1840s, but its name survives in a retail park and industrial area near the present Manor Royal estate in the north of Crawley. The timber was used to make an oaken screen for the nearby St Margaret's Church in Ifield. Most of the heath, including the section in which the village developed, was north of the county boundary, on the Surrey side, and this area was in the Parish of Charlwood. The small section which lay within Sussex—consisting of the part southwest of the County Oak—was in the Parish of Ifield. The land is low-lying, flat and often damp, as the River Mole rises nearby and is fed by many tributaries.

Although it was known about in the Domesday era, Lowfield Heath does not appear to have been named until the 14th century, when a man called Lowe lived locally. "Lowe Heath" became corrupted into "Lowfeild Heath" [sic], "Lovel Heath" and "Lovell Heath" by the 18th century. In the early 18th century, an Act of Parliament granted by King William III authorised the construction of 10 miles (16 km) of roadway from Reigate to Crawley. This crossed the heath, thereby encouraging development. The road was widened and made into a turnpike road in 1755, and became part of the main London to Brighton route in 1770 when an Act of Parliament was passed to widen and improve the road all the way from "the County Oak on Lovell Heath" to Brighton. For the first time, the London to Brighton route was fully turnpiked.

== Development of the village ==
Intermittent and haphazard development around the heath, consisting of farms and individual houses, had begun by 1700, when Oak Cottage and County Oak Cottage were built. These were at the extreme southwest corner of the heath, west of the London Road, and still survive as listed buildings; they have been converted into offices in the Amberley Court development within the County Oak industrial area. However, the core of the village was much further north, around the crossroads between the London to Brighton road (running from north to south) and the Charlwood road and its eastward continuation as the village street, Church Road. This only started to develop as a proper settlement after the common land began to be enclosed in 1827. The first section of land to be enclosed was around the windmill; the expectation of increased development of the land led to the miller applying for an injunction stopping the enclosure, which was unsuccessful. More land was enclosed in 1846, and by 1855 the routes of the roads across the heath became fixed.

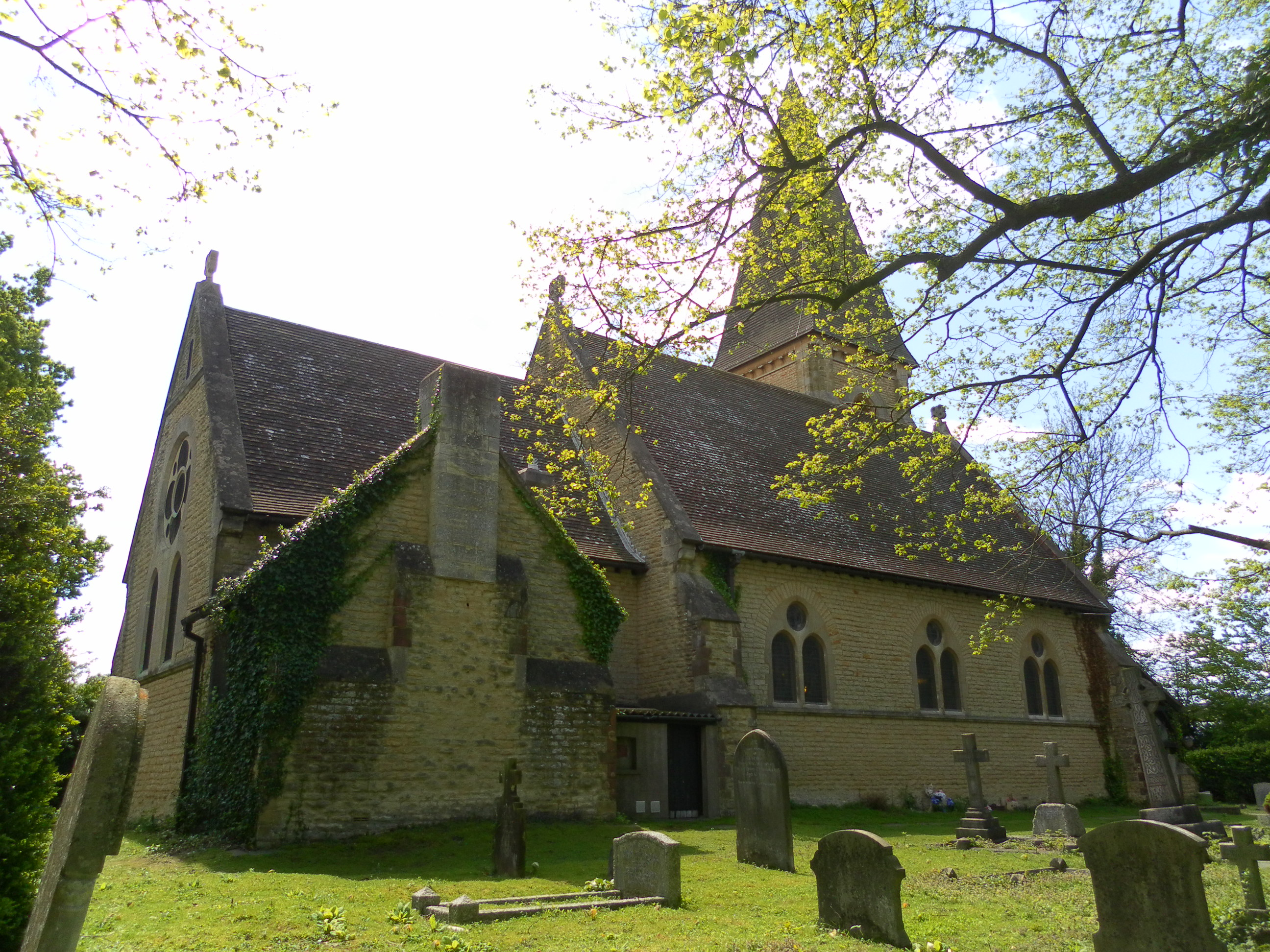
St Michael and All Angels Church from the northeast

Gradually, a small village developed around the crossroads. Many of its buildings were timber-framed, but its "architectural highlight", St Michael and All Angels Church, was built of yellow sandstone in 1867 by the architect William Burges. By 1900, the hamlet had reached its greatest size: it consisted of several houses, a public house (the White Lion), a tearoom, a school, a shop and post office, the church, some small manufacturing businesses and the windmill, which had stopped working around twenty years earlier. Also at this time, when Crawley was experiencing a period of Victorian-era growth, demand for bricks led to temporary brickyards being set up in and around the village.

Little changed until the 1950s; the creation in the mid-1930s of Gatwick Aerodrome, as it was then, had no significant effect on the village. The facility was small, and the focus of activity was around the "Beehive" terminal building which was some distance to the northeast. However, the decision to expand it into an international airport, resulting from its designation as London's second airport behind Heathrow, quickly resulted in Lowfield Heath's decline and demise. The aerodrome, as it still was, had been effectively at risk of closure until 1948, despite the local council's promise to develop it, and Stansted was expected to be chosen by the Government as the site for London's second airport. The new chairman of British European Airways, Peter Masefield, preferred Gatwick, however, and by 1950 the council had been told to prepare for Gatwick's redevelopment and expansion. The Government announced this in 1952, but by that time locals knew what was going to happen.

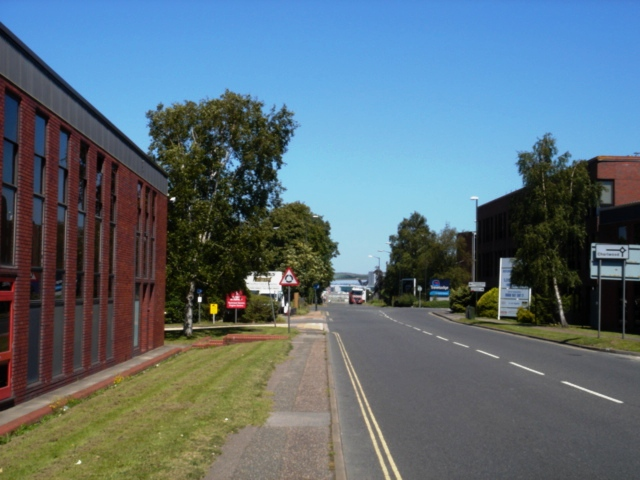
Looking north towards the runway, immediately behind the lorry (centre). This road was part of the main route from London to Brighton until the 1950s

The expansion required the building of a full-size runway on an approximately east–west alignment, immediately north of the Charlwood Road and Church Road. Throughout the 1950s, houses and other buildings were compulsorily purchased and demolished; houses unaffected by this (mainly those on the south and east sides of the village) were gradually depopulated as well as the village became an increasingly unattractive place to live. Property developers saw potential for the land to be used for warehousing and light industrial development; proximity to the airport and the main road were advantageous. The road was diverted and upgraded in 1956, the same year as construction work started on the airport: the section running northwards from Crawley became a dual carriageway, and approximately 200 yards (180 m) south of the village crossroads, the road was diverted sharply to the east at a new roundabout, continuing straight across an undeveloped section of the heath and around the newly defined perimeter of the airport until it met the London–Brighton railway line, at which point it turned north again. Other access roads were severed at the same time, and the old course of the London Road was blocked by a gate next to the runway. The only access to Lowfield Heath village was then along the downgraded "Old Brighton Road" from the new roundabout, or from the rural road from Charlwood. This further increased its isolation, and the remaining buildings were hemmed in between the diverted road and the airport perimeter fence. Apart from the church, the last vestiges of the old village disappeared in the early 1970s, when the White Lion public house and a few remaining houses were demolished.

The boundary between Surrey and West Sussex (Note: The former county of Sussex was divided into West Sussex and East Sussex by the same Act of Parliament.) was amended in 1974 as a result of the Local Government Act 1972 and its follow-up Act, the Charlwood and Horley Act 1974. Charlwood village remained in Surrey, but a large part of its former parish was transferred to West Sussex, including all of the land covered by Gatwick Airport. The whole of Lowfield Heath was included in this transfer. From 1 April 1974, therefore, Lowfield Heath became part of the Borough of Crawley and the county of West Sussex.

== The area today ==
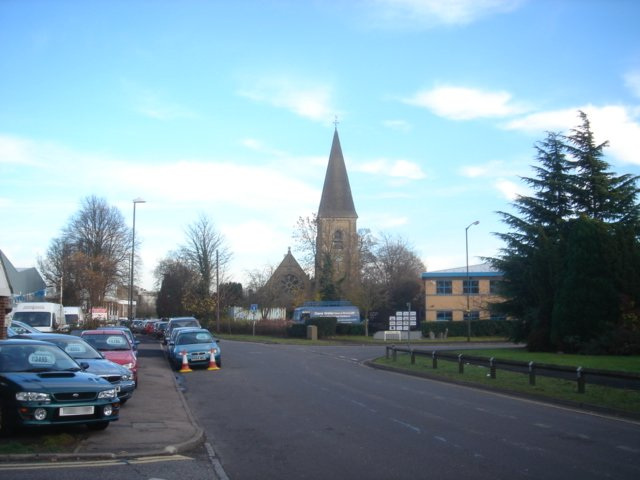
Eastward view along Church Road

Lowfield Heath still appears on maps. The name defines both the development around the old church, where the nucleus of the former village was, and the area of mostly undeveloped heathland whose approximate boundaries are the County Oak industrial area, Poles Lane, the airport's southern perimeter road and the main London Road (the A23).

St Michael and All Angels Church is the only building surviving from before the expansion of Gatwick Airport. It is surrounded by a mixture of warehouses, car showrooms, light industrial units, small offices and storage units. The largest building is a Travelodge hotel, marketed as "Travelodge Gatwick Airport", on the northeast corner of the crossroads. Along the Charlwood Road there are large car parks for airport passengers.

The church is nominally within the Anglican parish of Crawley, under the parish church of St John the Baptist's, but it is no longer used as an Anglican place of worship. After the last service in 2004, the Diocese of Chichester retained the building until March 2008, when it allowed a Seventh-day Adventist congregation to move in. It is now the venue for the Horley Seventh-Day Adventist Church, which was formally established in January 2008. The building had been listed at Grade II* in 1948, giving it some protection against demolition or significant alteration.

A Royal British Legion social club survived at Lowfield Heath until 2008. Built in 1948 on the Charlwood Road, the club attracted members from the village and surrounding areas, but slowly declined as the population fell. For many years, even after the village became depopulated, airport workers could walk straight off the runway and on to the road by the clubhouse, but increased airport security led to the permanent blocking of that route. The club closed in July 2007 and was sold a year later.

== See also ==
- Listed buildings in Crawley
- List of places of worship in Crawley
