= List of places of worship in Crawley =

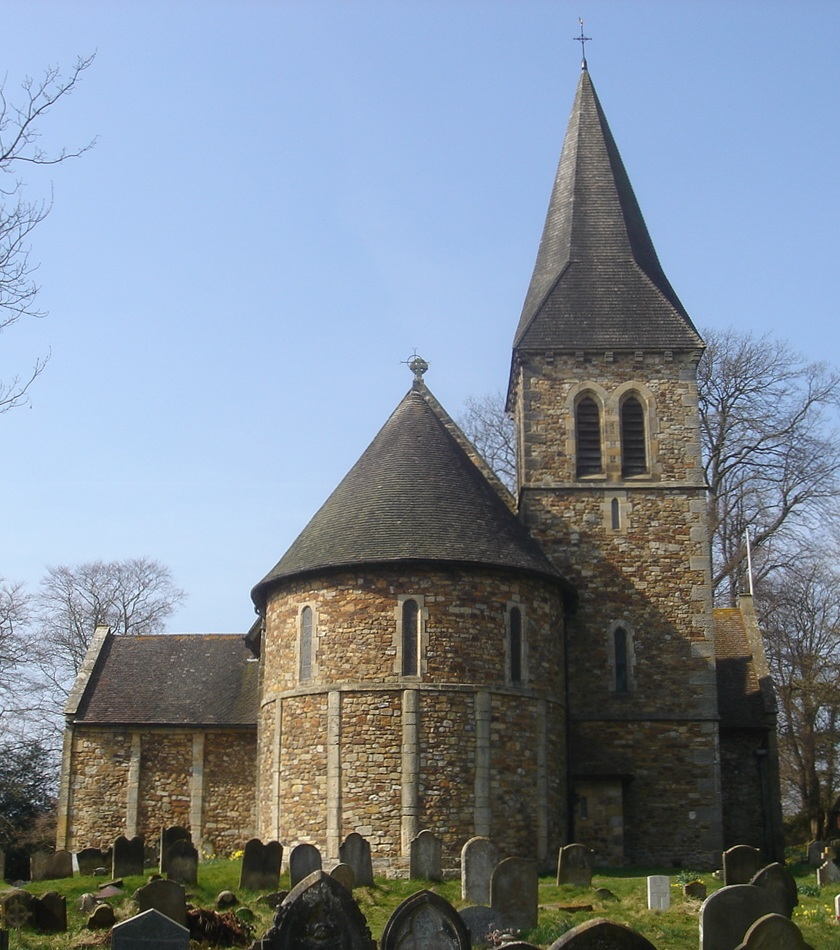
The liturgical east end of St Nicholas' Church, a Grade I-listed Saxon-era church

The borough of Crawley, in West Sussex, England, has 45 churches, chapels and other buildings used specifically for worship. Other religious communities meet in community centres, schools and other buildings whose primary function is secular. Four other former places of worship are no longer used by their original congregation, although only two of these have fallen out of use entirely. The borough covers the New Town of Crawley, whose development began in the late 1940s, and Gatwick Airport—an international airport which has two multi-faith chapels of its own. The New Town absorbed three villages with a long history of Christian worship, and later extensions to the boundary have brought other churches into the borough.

Although not forming a majority, the largest proportion of Crawley's residents are Christian; but it has a much larger proportion of Muslim and Hindu residents than England overall. There are two Hindu temples and a Hindu centre (Swaminarayan Manor), two Sikh gurdwaras and three mosques. A Quaker meeting house in the Ifield area is one of the oldest in the world.

Several churches have listed status in view of their architectural and historical importance, but most places of worship date from the postwar era when the New Town was developed, and are of modest architectural merit: Nikolaus Pevsner stated in 1965 that those built up to that time were "either entirely uneventful or more often mannered and contorted, with odd spikes and curvy roofs".

== History and development ==
Most of the borough's 44.97 km^{2} (17.36 sq mi) area is covered by Crawley New Town. The area around the villages of Three Bridges, Crawley and Ifield was selected by the British Government as the site for one of the developments proposed in the New Towns Act 1946. The Government set up a Development Corporation, headed by Sir Thomas Bennett, to coordinate the work. Anthony Minoprio designed the plans, and building work started in the late 1940s and continued until the late 1980s. The New Town consisted of self-contained neighbourhoods, each of which had at least one Anglican church. The Development Corporation's intention was for one to be placed at the centre of each neighbourhood, and for churches of other Christian denominations to occupy sites where they could serve a larger area covering several neighbourhoods. This plan was followed as far as practicable. The Corporation provided the freehold of the land on which churches were built at 25% of the price that applied for residential land use.

The old villages of Three Bridges, Crawley and Ifield lay within the ancient parishes of Crawley and Ifield. Both of their medieval parish churches are still used for Anglican worship: respectively, St John the Baptist's in Crawley town centre (much altered in the 19th century, and now surrounded by modern development) and St Margaret's Church in the old village of Ifield. The latter was rebuilt in the 14th century and retains most of its features from that time, although some fabric is older. Expansion of the borough's boundary has brought more churches into Crawley, including the early 11th-century church at Worth—formerly an isolated Wealden village at the centre of its own large parish. A large, architecturally sophisticated building, it has been called "one of the most powerful Anglo-Saxon churches" in England. Growth in the Victorian era prompted the construction of two more Anglican churches: St Michael and All Angels Church in 1867, to serve the village of Lowfield Heath (then in Surrey, and now obliterated by Gatwick Airport; the church survives and is used by Seventh-day Adventists), and St Peter's Church at West Green in Ifield parish (1892–93). The New Town-era churches were all newly built apart from the most recent, St Mary Magdalene's Church at Bewbush—a 17th-century barn retained from a farm which was built over when the neighbourhood was laid out and converted into a church in the 1990s.

An Capuchin friary was founded in the town centre in 1860, and the opening of the friary and church the following year gave local Roman Catholics a place to worship. The site was cleared in the 1950s when the new Friary Church of St Francis and St Anthony, Crawley was built. Additional churches were built to serve some of the neighbourhoods: Langley Green (1959), Tilgate (1962), Pound Hill (1965), Gossops Green (1971) and Broadfield (jointly used by Anglicans, Nonconformists and, from 1982, Catholics).

Ifield was a centre of Nonconformism in the 17th century: its Friends Meeting House was built in 1676, when more than 25% of the village's residents were Dissenters. There were Congregational and Baptist chapels near Crawley High Street from 1863 and 1883 respectively, a Free church mission hall in Three Bridges from 1876 and a Brethren Gospel hall from 1916. With the postwar growth of Crawley, other denominations became established: a Methodist church opened in 1953, Congregational churches in 1957 and 1963 (the latter replacing the 19th-century chapel), a Latter-day Saints meetinghouse in 1964, Spiritualist churches in 1965 and 1969, Pentecostal churches in 1971 and 1981, a Gospel hall in 1957 (replacing the earlier one), Kingdom Halls for Jehovah's Witnesses in 1963 and 1983, and Baptist churches in 1954 (at West Green, replacing the Victorian chapel, and itself rebuilt in 2003), 1970 (Tilgate) and 2001 (Maidenbower).

Two mosques were established in the town in the mid-1980s, and the Ahmadiyya community founded a third in the former Elim Pentecostal church in Langley Green in 2012. A Gurjar Hindu community became established in Crawley in 1968 and opened a mandir (temple) and community centre in a building in West Green in 1998. A new temple in the Ifield area was expected to open in December 2009, but construction was delayed and it opened on 23 May 2010. It is the largest such temple in South East England, at 230 m^{2} (2,500 sq ft), and also has a 1,216 m^{2} (13,090 sq ft) community centre, offices, gardens and sports facilities. There is no synagogue in Crawley, although a small Jewish community—followers of the Liberal Judaism—meet regularly. Planning permission for a synagogue had been granted in 1964, but it was never built. There is a Sikh gurdwara at Ifield and a smaller one at West Green. In January 2009 planning permission was granted for its demolition and replacement with a larger two-storey structure, but as of 2026 no work has started.

== Listed status ==
Historic England or its predecessor English Heritage have awarded listed status to seven church buildings in the borough. A building is defined as "listed" when it is placed on a statutory register of buildings of "special architectural or historic interest" in accordance with the Planning (Listed Buildings and Conservation Areas) Act 1990. The Department for Digital, Culture, Media and Sport, a Government department, is responsible for this; English Heritage, a non-departmental public body, acts as an agency of the department to administer the process and advise the department on relevant issues. There are three grades of listing status. Grade I, the highest, is defined as being of "exceptional interest"; Grade II* is used for "particularly important buildings of more than special interest"; and Grade II, the lowest, is used for buildings of "special interest". As of February 2001, there were three Grade I-listed buildings, 12 with Grade II* status and 80 Grade II-listed buildings in the borough of Crawley. Additionally, Crawley Borough Council grants locally listed building status to buildings which have historical or architectural interest at a local level, but which are not of sufficient quality to merit listing at a national level. As of November 2010, five churches in the borough were on the local list.

Grade	Criteria
Grade I	Buildings of exceptional interest, sometimes considered to be internationally important.
Grade II*	Particularly important buildings of more than special interest.
Grade II	Buildings of national importance and special interest.
Locally listed (L)	Buildings considered by the council to be "an important part of [the local] heritage due to [their] architectural, historic or archaeological significance".

== Religious affiliation ==
According to the 2021 United Kingdom census, 118,793 lived in Crawley. Of these, 42.62% identified themselves as Christian, 9.72% were Muslim, 5.14% were Hindu, 0.72% were Sikh, 0.45% were Buddhist, 0.08% were Jewish, 0.54% followed another religion, 35.07% claimed no religious affiliation and 5.67.12% did not state their religion. The proportions Muslims and Hindus in Crawley were considerably higher than the figures in England as a whole; while the proportions of Christians, Sikhs, Jews and people with no religious affiliation were lower, and the proportion of Buddhists roughly equal, compared to the national average. In 2021, 46.32% of people in England were Christian, 36.67% claimed no religious affiliation, 6.73% were Muslim, 1.81% were Hindu, 0.92% were Sikh, 0.48% were Jewish and 0.46% were Buddhist.

== Administration ==
All Anglican churches in Crawley are part of the Diocese of Chichester, whose cathedral is at Chichester in West Sussex. All are in the Horsham Archdeaconry, one of three archdeaconries which make up the next highest level of administration, and the Horsham Deanery – one of eight deaneries in the archdeaconry.

The Roman Catholic Diocese of Arundel and Brighton, whose cathedral is at Arundel, administers the borough's six Roman Catholic churches. The diocese has 11 deaneries, each with several churches. Crawley Deanery is responsible for St Francis and St Anthony's Church in the town centre, St Bernadette at Tilgate, Our Lady Queen of Heaven at Langley Green, St Edward the Confessor at Pound Hill, St Theodore of Canterbury at Gossops Green and the Church of Christ the Lord at Broadfield, all of which are part of a single parish, as well as the churches in the nearby villages and towns of Billingshurst, East Grinstead, Henfield, Horley, Horsham, Lingfield, West Grinstead and West Hoathly and the church at Worth Abbey.

Crawley Baptist Church in West Green and Green Fields Baptist Church at Tilgate are administratively part of the Gatwick Network of the South Eastern Baptist Association.

== Current places of worship ==
Current places of worship
Name	Image	Area/ Coordinates	Denomination/ Affiliation	Grade	Notes	Refs
Broadfield Islamic Centre and Mosque (More images)		Broadfield; 51.0975°N 0.2136°W	Muslim (Sunni)	–	A house in Broadfield had been used as a mosque since the early 1980s. An Islamic community centre, incorporating the new Quwwat-ul-Islam Mosque, was built c. 1989 to the design of Wakelin Associates in an "unusual and fairly successful" style blending Islamic motifs with vernacular architecture. Extensions were built between 2006 and 2012. Also known as Crawley Mosque, it follows the Sunni tradition of Islam.	
ChristChurch		Southgate; 51.1081°N 0.1847°W	Non-denominational	–	The building houses an independent Christian congregation which is associated with New Covenant Ministries International. Originally opened and registered in April in 1957 as Southgate Hall, a Plymouth Brethren meeting room (replacing a Gospel hall registered in September 1951 on Three Bridges Road), it became the Brewer Road Evangelical Church in the 1980s. Its registration under this name was cancelled in July 2008. A later identity was Gateway Church International.	
Christ the Lord Church (More images)		Broadfield; 51.0972°N 0.2031°W	Anglican, Roman Catholic, Evangelical	–	The brick building of polygonal design, built between 1980 and 1981 as an integral part of the new Broadfield neighbourhood's community centre, is a combined church and community centre shared by the Broadfield Christian Fellowship (an Evangelical congregation), Anglicans and Roman Catholics. The Anglican community is included in the parish of Southgate under St Mary's Church. It was registered for worship and for marriages in May 1982.	
Church of Jesus Christ of Latter-day Saints (More images)		Southgate; 51.1092°N 0.2008°W	Latter-day Saint	–	Sir Thomas Bennett, the principal architect of Crawley New Town, designed this chapel and its associated hall himself. It opened in 1964 and was registered for worship and for marriages in July of that year.	
Crawley Baptist Church (More images)		West Green; 51.1194°N 0.1942°W	Baptist	–	The first Baptist Church in Crawley was established in Station Road in 1883. It was severely damaged by a bomb during World War II, and new premises were built in the West Green neighbourhood in 1954. These were in turn demolished in 2002 to allow the present building to be constructed on the site; this was completed in 2003.	
Crawley Community Church		West Green; 51.1186°N 0.1977°W	Evangelical (Charismatic)	–	This Charismatic church is part of the Newfrontiers movement. Its worship and pastoral centre was originally a former private house in Southgate, but the church now owns The Charis Centre in West Green—a combined church, community facility and conference venue. It was registered for marriages in August 2012.	
Crawley Spiritualist Church and Healing Centre (More images)		Gossops Green; 51.1102°N 0.2158°W	Spiritualist	–	A Spiritualist community emerged in Crawley in 1950. Worshippers used private houses, halls in West Green and the town centre, and (between 1965 and 1969) the now demolished Goffs Hall in Southgate. The present wooden church in Gossops Green was registered for worship in April 1969 and for marriages a year later.	
Crawley United Reformed Church (More images)		Pound Hill; 51.1192°N 0.1572°W	United Reformed Church	L	This was founded in 1955 as a Congregational church called Christ Church. Architects Lomas and Pooley designed the building, which opened in 1957. It was registered for worship in February of that year and for marriages a year later. The Congregational and Presbyterian churches united in 1972 to form the United Reformed Church. In December 2010, Christ Church reformed under its present name when the congregation of Trinity Church in Ifield joined.	
Elim Church Crawley (More images)		Ifield; 51.1217°N 0.2058°W	Elim Pentecostal	–	This community church moved to this building after the former United Reformed Church congregation for which it was built in 1963 moved to Pound Hill. Trinity United Reformed Church closed in December 2010 and was sold to the Elim Pentecostal Church, who left their old church in Langley Green.	
Green Fields Baptist Church (More images)		Tilgate; 51.1019°N 0.1750°W	Baptist	–	Services were initially held in a temporary building on a site bought by the Baptist community in 1957. For a time during the 1960s the church was linked with the main Crawley Baptist Church in West Green. The present building dates from 1970; in April of that year it was registered for worship and for marriages under the name South Crawley Baptist Church.	
Holy Trinity Church (More images)		Tilgate; 51.1011°N 0.1803°W	Anglican	–	Tilgate's Anglican church was built in 1959 and is included in the parish of Southgate under St Mary's Church. Two services are held every Sunday morning. The west-facing entrance rises to a short tower topped with a flèche.	
Ifield Friends Meeting House		Ifield; 51.1267°N 0.2117°W	Quaker	I	Built in 1676, the "lovable" ashlar-walled building is one of the oldest purpose-built Quaker places of worship. William Penn and Elizabeth Fry were associated with it in its early years. The roof is gabled and hipped, and an even older cottage is attached. The plain interior is characteristic of old Nonconformist chapels. Extensive repairs have been carried out since 2010.	
Kingdom Hall		Northgate; 51.1206°N 0.1817°W	Jehovah's Witnesses	–	This opened in 1983 as one of three Kingdom Halls in Crawley. The others had been established in a room on The Broadway in the town centre in 1958 (this is no longer extant) and in Three Bridges in 1965. It was registered for worship in April 1983 and for marriages in January 1991, and is used by the Broadfield and Ifield Congregations of Jehovah's Witnesses.	
Kingdom Hall (More images)		Three Bridges; 51.1169°N 0.1658°W	Jehovah's Witnesses	–	First registered in May 1965, the Three Bridges neighbourhood's Kingdom Hall is the older of the two that remain in Crawley. It is used by the Three Bridges and Tilgate Congregations of Jehovah's Witnesses.	
Langley Green Islamic Centre and Mosque (More images)		Langley Green; 51.1308°N 0.1864°W	Muslim (Sunni)	–	The mosque, which follows the Sunni tradition, was founded in a converted house (link to picture) on the London Road near the County Oak industrial area in 1984. It was registered in June of that year. In 2008, members applied to redevelop the site and build a larger, purpose-built facility. The house was demolished, construction work started in 2012 and the "spectacular" new mosque opened on 8 June 2014.	
Maidenbower Baptist Church (More images)		Maidenbower; 51.1084°N 0.1531°W	Baptist	–	A Baptist church plant was established in a disused chapel in the town centre in the 1970s. Redevelopment resulted in its closure, and the congregation moved to Crawley's newest neighbourhood, Maidenbower. The community centre was used between 1996 and 2001, when the present church was opened.	
Noor Ahmadiyya Mosque (More images)		Langley Green; 51.1264°N 0.1927°W	Muslim (Ahmadiyya)	–	This building was bought by Crawley's Ahmadiyya community in April 2012 and has been reordered to form a mosque which opened in 2014. It was the first permanent church used by the Elim Pentecostal community of Crawley when it opened in 1971, but went out of use when the congregation moved to Ifield.	
Our Lady Queen of Heaven Church (More images)		Langley Green; 51.1247°N 0.2019°W	Roman Catholic	–	The brick and concrete church, registered for worship in November 1957 and for marriages in June 1958, is part of the Diocese of Arundel and Brighton's Crawley Parish, consisting of six churches in Crawley and a convent chapel in Copthorne. The building is a simple hall with a west façade of "jolly yellow tiles".	
St Alban's Church (More images)		Gossops Green; 51.1106°N 0.2175°W	Anglican	L	This brick building with a tall bell tower is part of the parish of Ifield under St Margaret's Church. It was designed by Thomas S. Ford and opened in 1962, although Anglican worship in the neighbourhood had begun four years earlier in a temporary building. Stained glass windows by Goddard & Gibbs are contemporary with the church, which was reordered internally in 1990.	
St Andrew's Church (More images)		Furnace Green; 51.1081°N 0.1686°W	Anglican	–	The original St Andrew's church was built between 1968 and 1969 and was part of the parish of Southgate under St Mary's Church. In 2009 the original church was demolished and replaced with a new building. The cross from the original church hangs on the outside.	
St Barnabas' Church (More images)		Pound Hill; 51.1181°N 0.1547°W	Anglican	–	Built either in 1955 or between 1956 and 1957 (sources vary) to the design of Arthur W. Kenyon, this large church is a brick structure with an attached hall.	
St Bernadette's Church (More images)		Tilgate; 51.1019°N 0.1831°W	Roman Catholic	–	Built in 1962 and registered for marriages in May of that year, the church is in the Diocese of Arundel and Brighton's Crawley Parish, consisting of six churches in Crawley and a convent chapel in Copthorne.	
St Edward the Confessor's Church (More images)		Pound Hill; 51.1166°N 0.1485°W	Roman Catholic	L	This church was constructed from reinforced concrete in 1965 to the design of Alexander Lane and has an integrated church hall. It is part of the Diocese of Arundel and Brighton's Crawley Parish, consisting of six churches in Crawley and a convent chapel in Copthorne. It was registered for worship and for marriages in April 1965.	
St Elizabeth's Church (More images)		Northgate; 51.1206°N 0.1819°W	Anglican	–	Northgate's Anglican church was built in 1958 and enlarged in 1965. Since weekly services stopped in 2005, one Sunday service has been held per month, and the building is also used by The Louise Ryrie School of Dance and Drama. A Performing Arts Sunday school is held every week. Architecturally, the church is a simple hall, tall and long with high-level clerestory windows and a small flèche.	
St Francis and St Anthony's Church (More images)		Crawley Town Centre; 51.1133°N 0.1878°W	Roman Catholic	II	Harry Stuart Goodhart-Rendel built this church on the site of a Capuchin Franciscan friary. Reordering and renovations took place in 1988 and 2008–09. The church is in the Diocese of Arundel and Brighton's Crawley Parish. Work took place between 1955 and 1959, and the new church was registered for worship and for marriages in November 1959. It is a large building of polychromatic brick, combining various architectural styles in "a composition of oddly assembled parts".	
St John the Baptist's Church (More images)		Crawley Town Centre; 51.1141°N 0.1888°W	Anglican	II*	Crawley's parish church was originally a chapel of ease in the parish of St Mary's Church, Slaugham. It was first mentioned in this context in 1291, and some 13th-century fabric survives. The dedication was first recorded in 1408. Extensive restoration in 1879–80 by Henry Woodyer followed the building of the tower in 1807.	
St Margaret's Church (More images)		Ifield; 51.1239°N 0.2194°W	Anglican	I	Ifield's parish church was built in the 13th century on the site of a 10th-century church and was subsequently extended. Mark Lemon is buried in the extensive churchyard. The exterior is roughcast. The broach spire-topped tower dates from 1883 and has "perplex[ing] ... odd and very effective" details such as three tall lancet windows.	
St Mary's Church (More images)		Southgate; 51.1055°N 0.1865°W	Anglican	L	Henry Braddock and D.F. Martin-Smith's 1958 building is designed so that the adjoining church hall can be used as an extension of the main church. The roof has a centrally-positioned flèche on top of a small, boxlike bell tower. One wall consists of concrete slabs pierced with decorative shards of blue glass. It became a parish church in 1959; the churches at Broadfield, Furnace Green and Tilgate are linked to it as part of a Team Ministry.	
St Mary Magdalene's Church (The Barn Church) (More images)		Bewbush; 51.0989°N 0.2294°W	Anglican	II	Part of the parish of Ifield, under St Margaret's Church, this is a small "barn church" with strong community involvement. The "very attractive" 17th-century building, part of the now vanished Bewbush Manor Farm, was converted into a church between 1989 and 1999 by architect Clive Mercer with support from the National Lottery Heritage Fund. It was consecrated in July 1999. Services in Bewbush had begun before 1984 in another building.	
St Michael and All Angels Church (Gatwick SDA Church) (More images)		Lowfield Heath; 51.1458°N 0.1797°W	Seventh-day Adventist	II*	William Burges built this French Gothic Revival church in 1867 as the Anglican parish church of the village of Lowfield Heath. Boundary changes moved it from Surrey into the Borough of Crawley in 1974, but by then the village had been rendered uninhabitable by the expansion of Gatwick Airport. The Diocese of Chichester allowed the Seventh-day Adventist Church to take over the building in 2008.	
St Nicholas' Church (Worth Church) (More images)		Worth; 51.1103°N 0.1416°W	Anglican	I	The parish church of Worth is now within the Borough of Crawley. It is of Saxon origin (probably 11th-century); Nikolaus Pevsner called it "one of the most powerful of Anglo-Saxon churches". It was extended in the 13th century and restored in 1871 (by Anthony Salvin, who added the tower) and 1986.	
St Paul's Methodist Church (More images)		Northgate; 51.1203°N 0.1803°W	Methodist	–	The present church was built to a polygonal brick design in 1966, and replaced an adjacent building of 1953 which then became the church hall. The new building has extensive timberwork inside and a copper roof. The church was registered for worship in January 1954 and for marriages four years later.	
St Peter's Church (More images)		West Green; 51.1150°N 0.1956°W	Anglican	L	This large church was designed between 1892 and 1893 by W. Hilton Nash and built by Richard Cook, owner of a large building firm in the town. It replaced a nearby chapel of ease to St Margaret's Church. The Gothic Revival building has a bellcote and sandstone walls. There is some dalle de verre stained glass designed by Pierre Fourmaintraux in 1969. The chancel was screened off in 1991 to form a hall for community use.	
St Richard of Chichester's Church (More images)		Three Bridges; 51.1175°N 0.1736°W	Anglican	–	The first St Richard of Chichester's Church was built in 1952 by N.F. Cachemaille-Day and Partners. It was found to be structurally unsound, declared redundant as from 1 January 1994 and demolished. In November 1993, Crawley Borough Council granted planning permission for a new church on a nearby site, which was completed in 1995 to the design of G. Claridge.	
St Theodore of Canterbury's Church (More images)		Gossops Green; 51.1131°N 0.2136°W	Roman Catholic	–	Built in 1971, the church has a brick exterior and a timber internal structure with cruck framing. It is part of the Diocese of Arundel and Brighton's Crawley Parish. An earlier chapel with this dedication, built in 1959 to the design of Clayton, Black and Daviel, was registered for worship in December 1959 and for marriages five months later. The carved relief of St Theodore by Joseph Cribb was retained from the old church and was placed on the east wall.	
Sanatan Mandir (More images)		Ifield; 51.1300°N 0.2109°W	Hindu	–	This temple replaced the Gurjar Hindu Union's building in West Green, which has been demolished. Work at Apple Tree Farm, a 8.5-acre (3.4 ha) site on the Ifield/Langley Green border, began in May 2008. Planning permission was temporarily withdrawn, but work restarted in 2009 and continued until May 2010, when the temple opened. It was registered for marriages in October 2012.	
Siri Guru Singh Sabha Gurdwara (Ifield) (More images)		Ifield; 51.1293°N 0.2145°W	Sikh	–	Members of Crawley's Sikh community worshipping at the town's existing gurdwara in West Green bought a building (previously used as a social club and sports centre) at Ifield Green in June 2012. Planning permission for conversion into a place of worship was granted in August 2015, and the new gurdwara was registered the following January.	
Siri Guru Singh Sabha Gurdwara (West Green) (More images)		West Green; 51.1136°N 0.1939°W	Sikh	–	This is the original place of worship for the town's Sikhs. The single-storey structure was built in 1982, registered for worship in March of that year and granted a marriage certification in November 1988. Up to 250 worshippers regularly attend from a wide area: the temple serves Sikhs across a 25-mile (40 km) radius. Crawley Borough Council granted permission in 2009 for the building to be demolished and replaced with a new temple, prior to the Ifield site being acquired.	
Sri Swarna Kamadchy Amman Temple		Three Bridges; 51.1136°N 0.1664°W	Hindu	–	This Hindu temple is based on the Stephenson Way industrial estate. Its founder was Swami Sri Suntharesa Kurukal.	
Swaminarayan Manor Gatwick (More images)		Langley Green; 51.1358°N 0.2098°W	Hindu	–	This Swaminarayan Hindu centre opened in 2006 on Bonnetts Lane near Ifield village. It was converted from a hotel, and accommodation is still provided on site.	
The Meeting Room		Povey Cross; 51.1660°N 0.1817°W	Plymouth Brethren Christian Church	–	A small building was registered for worship under this name on Povey Cross Road near Horley. It is just on the West Sussex side of the Surrey county boundary. Planning permission for its construction was granted in October 1999. It is associated with the Plymouth Brethren Christian Church's main meeting hall for the area in Whitmore Way, Horley.	
Three Bridges Free Church (More images)		Three Bridges; 51.1169°N 0.1647°W	Evangelical	–	This church was built in 1963 on land purchased in 1958 to replace the nearby Worth Mission Hall, which was built in 1876 and extended in 1884. It was registered for worship and for marriages in March 1964.	
Three Bridges Spiritualist Church and Psychic Centre (More images)		Three Bridges; 51.1180°N 0.1650°W	Spiritualist	–	When the former Worth Mission Hall was vacated by Three Bridges Free Church, who had built a new church nearby, a Spiritualist community took over the building. They re-registered it for worship (originally as New Town Psychic Centre) and for marriages in October 1966.	
Transformation Community Church (More images)		Furnace Green; 51.1069°N 0.1717°W	Assemblies of God	–	This Pentecostal church, which offers a weekly service on Sundays, is affiliated with the Assemblies of God denomination. It was built in 1981, before which the community used rooms in Crawley town centre. The building was registered for worship in September 1982, and a certification for solemnising marriages was granted eight months later. Until 2026 it was known as Crawley New Life Church.	
Voice of Deliverance Full Gospel Church of God (More images)		Langley Green; 51.1278°N 0.1972°W	Pentecostal	–	Soon after St Leonard's Anglican church closed, a Pentecostal group with a mostly Mauritian and Diego Garcian congregation acquired it and converted it into a church. Previously they worshipped in the adjacent church hall. The first service took place on 29 March 2014.	

== Former places of worship ==
Former places of worship
Name	Image	Area/ Coordinates	Denomination/ Affiliation	Grade	Notes	Refs
Elim Church (More images)		Langley Green; 51.1264°N 0.1927°W	Elim Pentecostal	–	This was the first permanent church used by the Elim Pentecostal community of Crawley. Opened in 1971 and registered in October of that year, it served until 2011 when the community moved into the former Trinity United Reformed Church in Ifield. It was then sold and became the Ahmadiyya mosque.	
St Leonard's Church		Langley Green; 51.1278°N 0.1972°W	Anglican	–	Langley Green's Anglican church, built of brick in 1954–55, was latterly is in the parish of Ifield under St Margaret's Church. Falling congregations and a high maintenance bill forced it to close in 2013; the remaining congregation joined other Anglican churches. The last service was on 29 December 2013.	
Salvation Army Citadel		West Green; 51.1139°N 0.1953°W	Salvation Army	–	The Salvation Army opened and registered this place of worship at 51 Spencers Road in 1902. It was still in use in 1985, but after that the building was sold and worship moved to the community centre in Ifield Drive, Ifield (under the name Crawley Outreach Centre). Its worship certification was cancelled in October 2003, and later uses included a furniture warehouse.	
Trinity Church		Ifield; 51.1217°N 0.2058°W	United Reformed Church	–	The church had its origins in the Trinity Congregational church, built in Robinson Road in 1863. The Gothic Revival building was demolished in 1962 and this new church was provided the following year in Ifield Drive. It was registered for worship and for marriages in April 1963, but in December 2010 it closed and the congregation moved to Christ Church at Pound Hill, which was reformed as Crawley United Reformed Church. The building is now the home of Elim Church.	

== Communities with no dedicated building ==
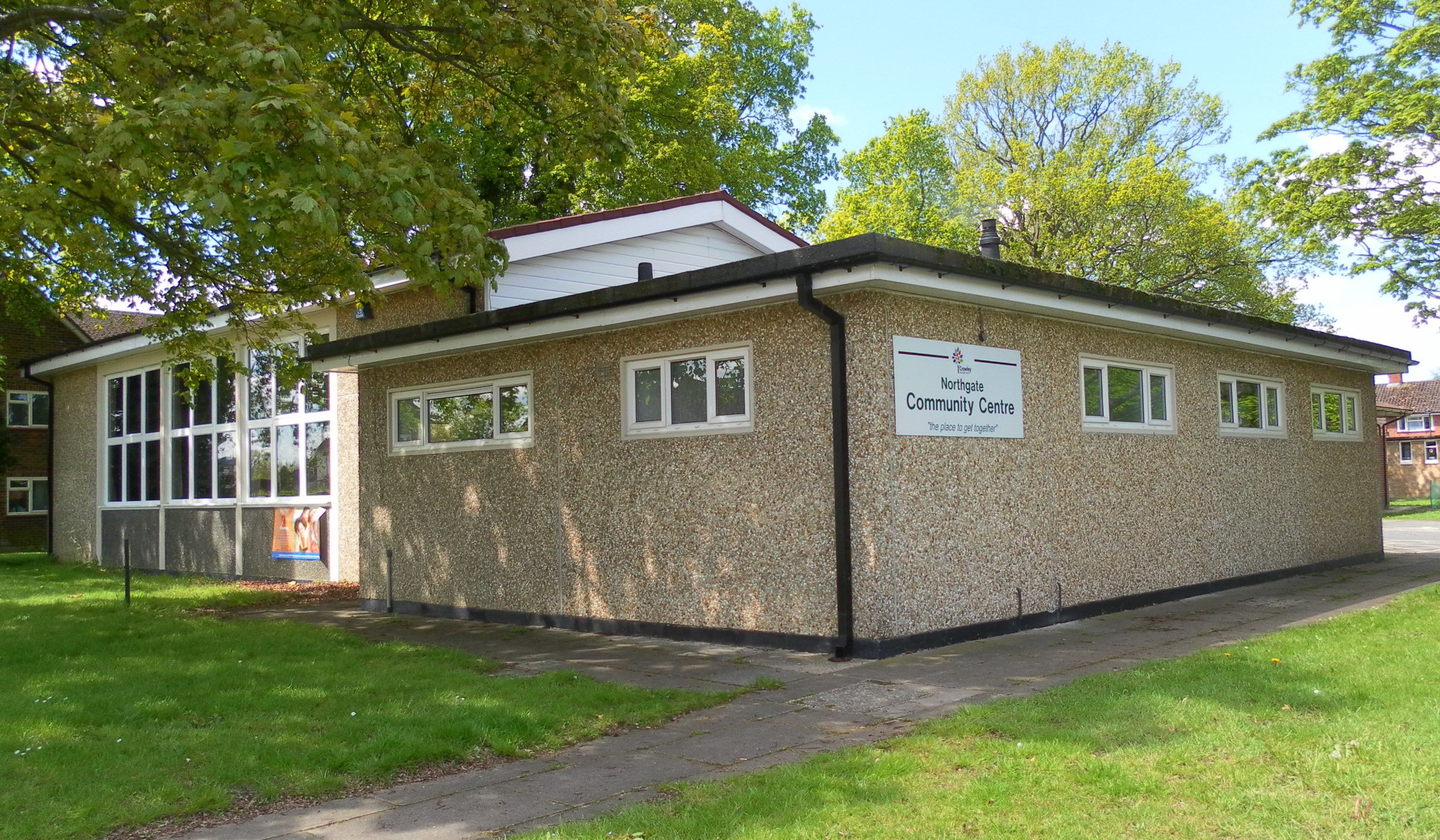
Northgate Community Centre is home to the non-denominational Solution Chapel International.

There are several communities in Crawley that do not worship at a building used solely for religious purposes. The non-denominational Crawley Family Church uses Waterfield Primary School, which opened in 1985 in Bewbush. Also in Bewbush, an Elim Pentecostal congregation meets weekly at Bewbush Community Primary School; regular prayer meetings, study groups and other social activities take place elsewhere in the neighbourhood. The congregation was established in May 2005. This church is associated with the Elim church in Langley Green. The Crawley Gatwick Church of Christ, an independent, non-denominational congregation formed in 1996, meets at the community centre in Gossops Green. The Salvation Army established a barracks in 1902 in West Green, but the Crawley branch is now based in Ifield: worship takes place at the neighbourhood's community centre. The Kingdom Faith church, affiliated with a group of churches based in nearby Horsham, meets at Oriel High School in the Maidenbower neighbourhood and at Roffey Place, just over the borough boundary at Faygate. Also in Maidenbower, Anglican services are held in the community centre and at the neighbourhood's infant school. In 2006, a Pentecostal community founded the Exodus Pentecostal Church, which worships at Tree House—Crawley's ancient manor house, now owned by the Borough Council. The weekly services cater especially for residents from Diego Garcia and Mauritius. Also in the town centre, the Potter's House Church uses the church hall of St John the Baptist's Church. It is part of the London Fellowship of Potter's House Christian Fellowship churches. The Solution Chapel International, a non-denominational church founded in January 2009 by Pastor Adama Segbedji with just 2 adults and 1 child has grown to become the largest non denominational, multi cultural church, is based at Northgate Community Centre. The Powerhouse Revival Centre meets for worship at the community centre on Ifield Drive in the Ifield neighbourhood.

== Gatwick Airport ==
One of London's international airports, Gatwick Airport, was moved into the Borough of Crawley in 1974. A year earlier, a multi-faith chaplaincy had been established in the terminal building (now the South Terminal). The chaplaincy is coordinated by the Anglican minister, whose licence was renewed in November 2008. Roman Catholic and Free Church ministers are also on site. When the North Terminal was built, a similar chapel was provided there. Both chapels are open at all times for prayer and meditation, and offer regular services throughout the week.

== See also ==
- List of demolished places of worship in West Sussex
- Listed buildings in Crawley
- Locally listed buildings in Crawley
