= St Michael and All Angels Church, Lowfield Heath =

St Michael and All Angels Church
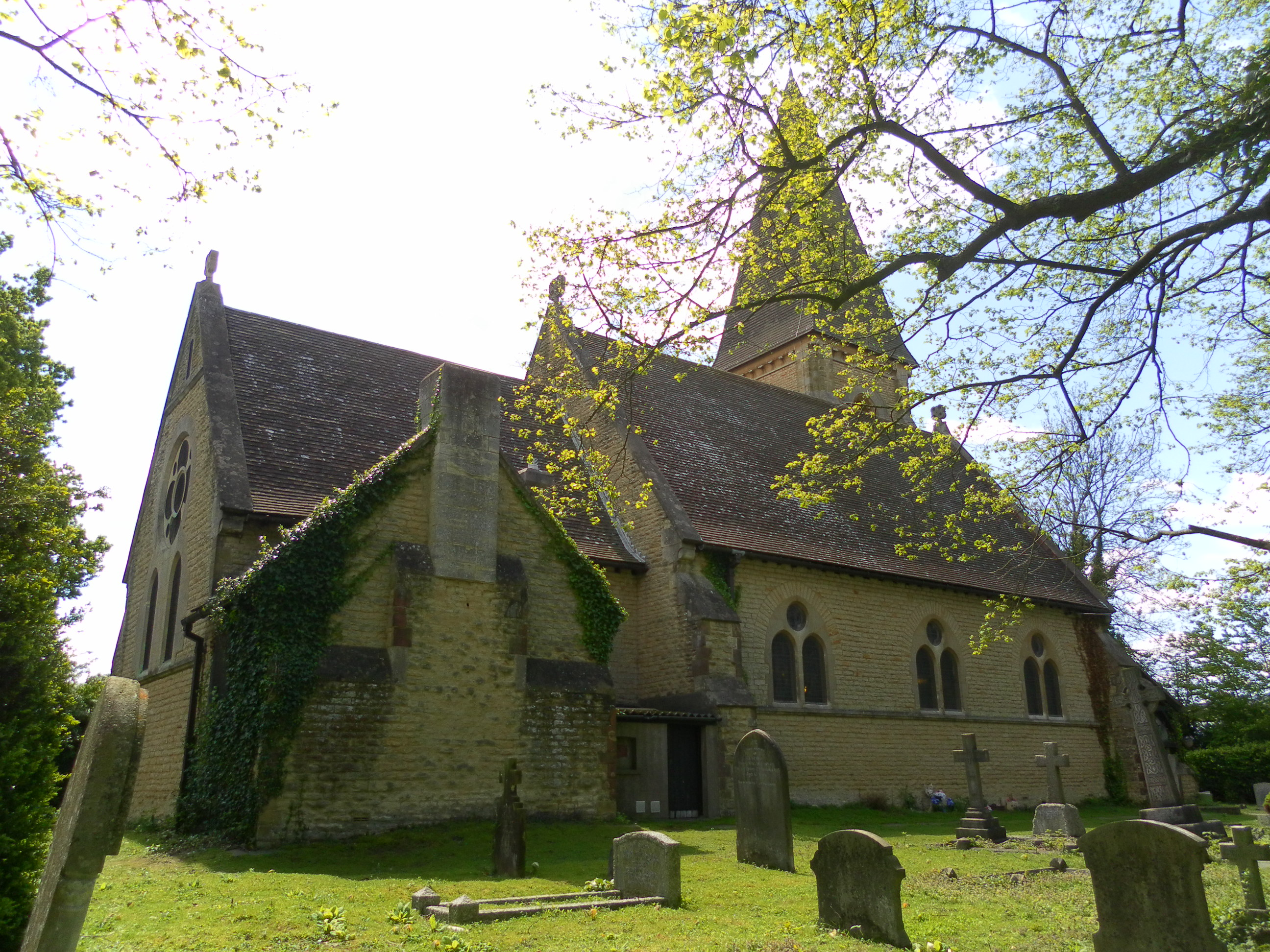
- The church from the north

- Location within the Borough of Crawley
- 51°8′45″N 0°10′47″W
- Location: Church Road, Lowfield Heath, Crawley, West Sussex, RH11 0PQ
- Country: England
- Denomination: Seventh-day Adventist
- Previous denomination: Church of England
- Website: https://gatwick.adventistchurch.org.uk/

History
- Founded: 15 July 1867
- Dedicated: 1 December 1868

Architecture
- Heritage designation: Listed building – Grade II*
- Architect: William Burges
- Style: French Gothic
- Years built: 1867–1868
- Closed: 2004 (reopened 2008 as Horley Seventh-day Adventist Church)

Administration
- Diocese: Área 4
- Parish: South England Conference of the Seventh-day Adventist

St Michael and All Angels Church is a church in Lowfield Heath, a depopulated former village in the Borough of Crawley, West Sussex, England. Built by the Gothic Revival architect William Burges in 1867 to serve the village, it declined in importance as Lowfield Heath was gradually appropriated for the expansion of London Gatwick Airport and of its related development. The last Anglican service was held there in 2004, but the church reopened in 2008 as a Seventh-day Adventist place of worship. The building has Grade II* listed status, which identifies it as a "particularly important building of more than special interest" and of national importance. It is also the only building remaining in the former village from the era before the airport existed: every other structure was demolished, and the church now stands among warehouses, depots and light industrial units.

== History ==
The hamlet of Lowfield Heath began to develop on the heath of the same name, 2 miles (3.2 km) north of Crawley, after 1770 when the London to Brighton road was turnpiked. The road ran across the heath on its way to Crawley, and a few farms and houses were built close to it. The heath, which had been common land, was enclosed in 1827 and 1846, encouraging more residential development. Lowfield Heath grew into a small village, with amenities such as a school, public house and post office.

Lowfield Heath village, and the heath itself, straddled the county boundary between Surrey and Sussex, but the village was administratively part of Surrey and for ecclesiastical purposes lay within the Parish of Charlwood. A merchant donated some land in the centre of the village, which had been used to grow damsons, for the construction of a church. Architect William Burges, who had worked on The Great Exhibition in London and St Finbarre's Cathedral in Cork and who later built Cardiff Castle and Castell Coch in Wales, was employed to build a church on the site.

Work started in 1867, and the foundation stone was laid on 15 July of that year. The consecration ceremony took place on 1 December 1868. Despite its small size, the village continued to thrive for the next 80 years, and the church was considered its "architectural highlight". Its architectural merit received official recognition on 21 June 1948, when it was listed at Grade II*.

The village fell into steady decline in the 1950s when Gatwick Aerodrome was expanded to become London Gatwick Airport—London's second international airport. Between the early 1950s, when the Government announced its decision, and the early 1970s, when the White Lion public house and the last few houses were demolished, every original building in the village, except the church, was destroyed. Following the rapid expansion of nearby Crawley, and the extension of its ancient parish to include several churches and large parts of the New Town, St Michael and All Angels was transferred from the Parish of Charlwood to the Parish of Crawley, thereby coming under the control of the parish church of St John the Baptist's and the Diocese of Chichester. This happened despite the church and the remains of the village still being administratively in Surrey. (The area was transferred to the newly created county of West Sussex in 1974, removing this anomaly. Since 1 April 1974, therefore, the church has been within the Borough of Crawley.)

A special service was held at the church in 1989 to commemorate the loss of the village. A plaque was unveiled by the entrance door:

In commemoration of a service held in this church at Lowfield Heath on the 30th September 1989 for the occasion of a reunion of those who formed the village community at the outbreak of the Second World War in 1939 and whose homes and village were subsequently displaced by the development of Gatwick International Airport

== Architecture ==
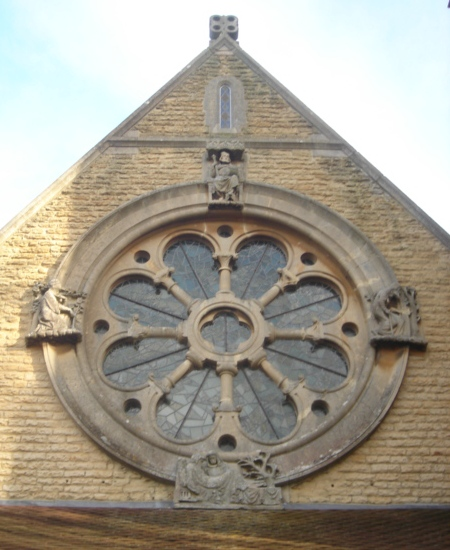
The rose window in the west wall

William Burges adopted a French Gothic style, similar to that popular in the 13th century, for his design for St Michael and All Angels. The exterior is of small, regular blocks of mostly undressed yellow sandstone quarried from the nearby St Leonard's Forest. Bath Stone is also used sparingly as a dressing material. The building has a tower at the southwest corner with a shingled timber spire, a narthex at the western end (with a large rose window in the west face), a vestry on the north side and a chancel and nave. Carved panels surround the rose window, representing the Four Ages of Man. The roofs of the main body of the church are quite steep, and internally are built of pine in an arch formation with tie-beams and supported by king posts. Paired columns mounted on corbels support the chancel arch. Burges was responsible for many of the sculptures and carvings inside the church, and there are some stained glass windows from the 19th and 20th centuries. The east wall has a pair of lancet windows and a small rose window. The churchyard contains the war graves of two soldiers of World War I and a Royal Air Force officer of World War II.

== The church today ==
The Diocese of Chichester stopped using the church for services in 2004, and sought to dispose of the building. In March 2008 it allowed a Seventh-day Adventist congregation to use it as its place of worship. Horley Seventh-Day Adventist Church was formed in May 2005 as a church plant of an Adventist community in the Hackbridge area of London, and was formally established in January 2008.

== See also ==
- List of places of worship in Crawley
- Listed buildings in Crawley
