= St Margaret's Church, Ifield =

Listed church in Crawley, West Sussex, England

St Margaret, Ifield
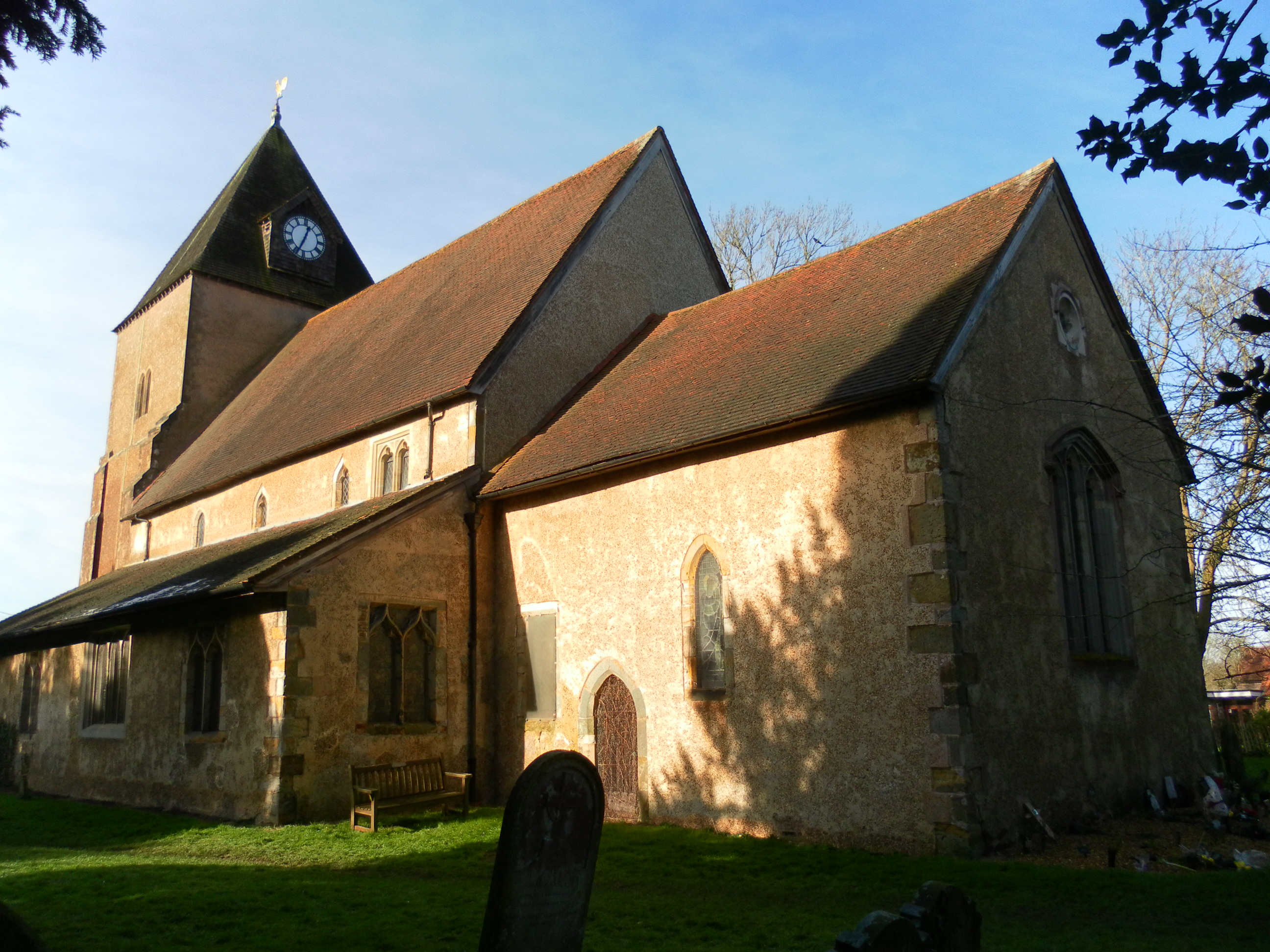
- The church from the east-southeast

- Location within the Borough of Crawley
- 51°7′26″N 0°13′10″W
- Denomination: Church of England
- Website: http://www.ifieldparish.org

History
- Dedication: Margaret of Antioch

Administration
- Province: Canterbury
- Diocese: Chichester
- Archdeaconry: Horsham
- Deanery: East Grinstead
- Parish: Ifield, St Margaret

Clergy
- Priest: The Rev'd Christine Spencer

St Margaret's Church is an Anglican church in the Ifield neighbourhood of Crawley, a town and borough in West Sussex, England. It is the ancient parish church of the village of Ifield; the medieval settlement was expanded to form one of the New Town of Crawley's 13 neighbourhoods, and the church's modern parish now serves several other neighbourhoods as well.

The present building incorporates the chancel from a 13th-century church which may have replaced a wooden building of two or three centuries earlier. Additions in the 14th century included stone effigies representing a knight and his wife, considered to be excellent examples of such sculptures. More structural changes took place at regular intervals, and a major Victorian restoration by architect Somers Clarke included an extension to the nave and a new tower. English Heritage has listed the church at Grade I because of its architectural and historical importance.

The churchyard has many old tombs and monuments, including writer Mark Lemon's grave and an elaborately decorated table tomb, which is listed separately by English Heritage at Grade II. Further memorials adorn the interior walls. Internal fixtures include a 12th-century font with unusual decorative carvings.

== History ==
The ancient parish of Ifield covered about 4,000 acres (1,600 ha) of rural land in the north of Sussex, up to the border with Surrey. It was attached to the priory at nearby Rusper by the mid-13th century. The church was built in the centre of the small settlement of Ifield, which was recorded in the Domesday Book of 1086. The present stone building is believed to stand on the site of an older wooden church—possibly dating from the 10th or 11th century. The earliest record of a vicar being present at the Church was in 1247 but is simply listed as '?' on the Church's list although 'Simon' took over in 1288 and there has been 53 vicars since then.

By the 13th century, the church had a stone-built nave and chancel; the latter survives in the present building, as does a 12th-century font which was probably taken from the building in place at that time. A chancel arch was inserted between the nave and chancel in about 1300. The dedication to Saint Margaret is later: it was first recorded in 1489.

Aisles were added to the nave in the 14th century, first on the north side and then on the south, doubling the seating capacity. More windows were also installed in the nave. A century later, a timber porch was built on the north side, the chancel arch was widened and a rood screen was installed, a standard feature of churches in the medieval era, as were wall decorations and paintings. Ecclesiastical feeling moved in favour of austere, whitewashed walls, screens and pillars by the 17th century, and Parliament decreed these changes in the 1640s. The vicar of Ifield, Reverend Robert Goddin, was a strict Protestant who was strongly opposed to Catholic-style worship, ceremony and church decoration, and he enforced the new style rigorously. The rood screen and all internal decoration were removed at this time.

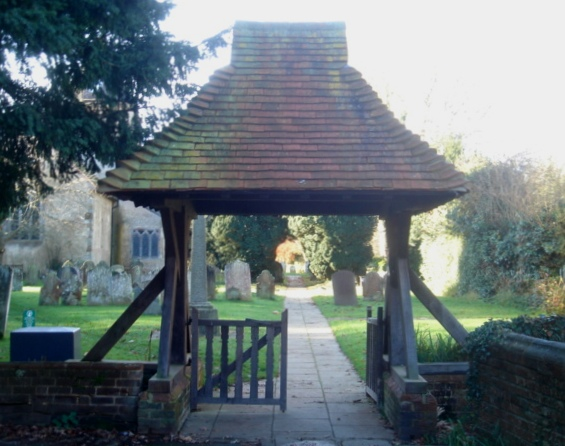
Lychgate at the churchyard entrance

The next major work took place in 1760, when a gallery was built for the choir and the pews were replaced with large box-pews taken from St Margaret's Church, Westminster (the parish church of the Palace of Westminster in London). More restoration took place in 1785. In 1847, the roof was improved and a vestry was built, incorporating wood from one of Crawley's famous old trees, the "County Oak", which had been cut down at that time. (The tree marked the ancient county boundary between Sussex and Surrey.) A barrel organ was installed in 1850. Between 1883 and 1884, architect and archaeologist Somers Clarke and fellow architect J. T. Micklethwaite built a tall, substantial tower at the west end to replace an earlier small tower over the porch (which had itself replaced the much older bell turret); lengthened the nave; and removed a gallery at the west end of the church.

The exterior walls are of rough-hewn stone, but this has been hidden under modern layers of cement. The church is approached from the east through a lychgate at the end of Ifield Street, the ancient village street.

== Architecture ==
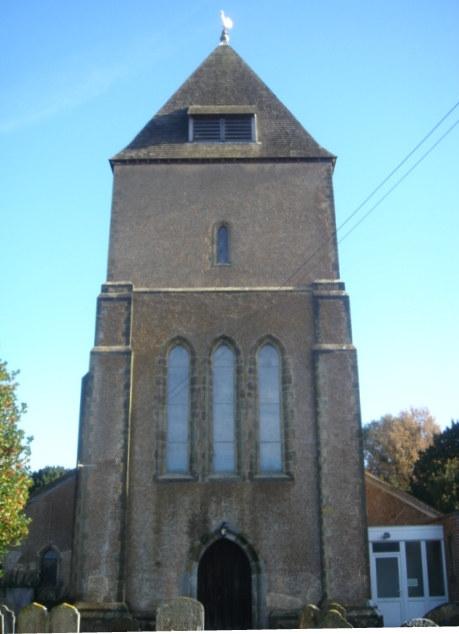
The tower from the west

St Margaret's Church has a chancel, wide nave with a narrow clerestory above and narrow three-bay aisles on the north and south sides, a tall tower (topped with a spire) at the west end and a porch on the north side. The nave, chancel and chancel-arch all date from the 13th century. The aisles and their arcades are largely unaltered from their 14th-century origins: between them they feature various mouldings and designs typical of that period, including chamfered arches, octagonal columns and squinch corners. Many of the windows also date from that century, while others are a century later; trefoil-headed designs predominate, but there are some larger square-headed Perpendicular Gothic windows as well. Several other windows contain stained glass, including 20th-century designs by Brian Thomas. The roof of the nave is tall and steeply pitched, with substantial king posts and tie-beams. It is also of medieval origin.

Architectural historian Nikolaus Pevsner considered the tower to be "perplexing", but described its windows and double internal arch as "odd and very effective details". Unusually, it is rendered with roughcast in the same way as the body of the church, producing a "heavy" effect. It has three tall lancet windows on the lower stage, and a much smaller lancet above. The three lancets depict the Resurrection, Crucifixion and Ascension of Jesus Christ respectively.

Many of the internal fittings date from the 19th-century renovations. The baptismal font is by far the oldest feature of the church, dating from the late 12th century. Made of local marble, it has an intricately carved stem flanked by four columns topped with delicate leaf-like capitals and roll mouldings, ornamentation uncommon on a Norman-era font. Its form is otherwise typical: a deep square bowl supported by a wide central column and four narrower shafts.

== Memorials and churchyard ==
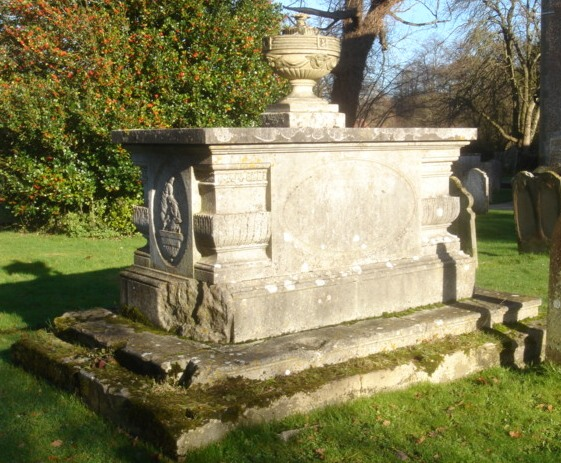
The Hutchinson table tomb

At the east end of the nave are two large 14th-century stone effigies, survivors of the 17th-century upheaval and all subsequent changes to the church, and now considered to be "high quality" examples of their kind. They are life-size representations of a knight in a full suit of armour and a woman, both lying on their backs in prayer. Most sources identify them as John de Ifelde (Sir John of Ifield) and his wife, Lady Margaret. There is some disagreement over their date of death and the date the effigies were carved, although 1340 is most often cited. The figures may have been carved in London rather than locally. Their heads rest on angels and their feet on lions. Pevsner had great praise for the effigies, noting that they were "far above the usual standard" and had an "inimitable sideways sway". Such carved effigies are rare in Sussex—it is more common to find empty plinths or recesses where they once stood—and there are only three other recorded examples in the county.

Mark Lemon, the founding editor of the satirical magazine Punch, lived in the parish in the mid-19th century. He owned Vine Cottage on Crawley High Street, which formed the boundary between Ifield parish and the Crawley parish of St John the Baptist. He often worshipped at St John the Baptist's, which was much closer, but was buried at St Margaret's in 1870.

A large table tomb at the west end of the churchyard is listed separately by English Heritage as a Grade II-listed structure. Dating from about 1800, it contains the remains of George and Mary Hutchinson. The structure is of pale (but heavily weathered) stone, including a two-step plinth, with various inscriptions on the sides, topped with a carved urn decorated with putti. The Grade II listing was given on 23 February 1983.

There are several other large tombs from the 18th century in the churchyard—some of which are good examples of the use of artificial Coade stone, popular at the time—and several brass and stone memorial tablets inside the church from the 16th century onwards. George Hutchinson has a prominent wall memorial in the chancel in addition to his tomb outside; local sculptor Richard Joanes designed it, and there are Coade stone embellishments. Other carved tablets, such as those to Reverend Lewin and Nicholas Spencer, are by obscure London-based mid-19th-century sculptor T. Marsh.

The churchyard also contains ten Commonwealth war graves of British service personnel, seven from World War I and three from World War II.

== Parish and church today ==
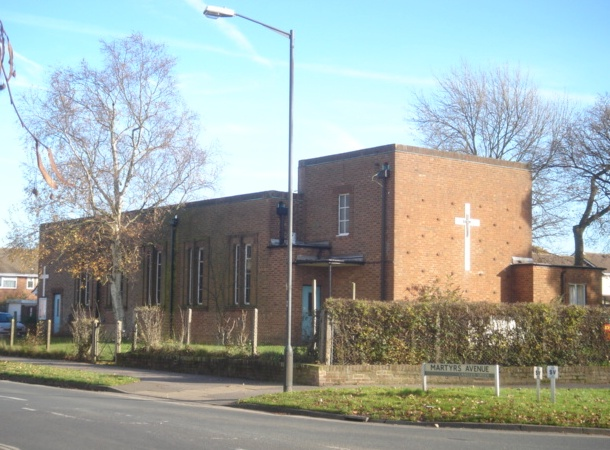
St Leonard's Church, Langley Green

St Margaret's was listed at Grade I by English Heritage on 23 February 1983. It is one of the three Grade I buildings, and 100 listed buildings of all grades, in the Borough of Crawley. Buildings classified as Grade I are considered to be of "exceptional interest" and national importance.

The present-day parish of Ifield covers the west of Crawley and its rural hinterland. The A23 and A2220 roads, between County Oak and the A264, form the eastern and southern boundaries. Beyond the edge of the Ifield West estate, the boundary extends to Faygate and the farms and rural roads around that hamlet. The northern border is close to the county boundary with Surrey and the southern edge of Gatwick Airport.

St Margaret's serves as the parish church of Ifield parish, which has four churches—one in each of the neighbourhoods it covers—and a church plant venue at Ifield West (part of the Ifield neighbourhood). A team rector, responsible for the running of all four churches and their pastoral care, is based at St Margaret's. Bewbush is served by St Mary Magdalene's Church in the far southwest of the parish. St Alban's Church, a brick building with a tall bell tower, is in nearby Gossops Green, and Langley Green is served by St Leonard's Church. All of these churches were built after the Second World War, when the new town was designed.

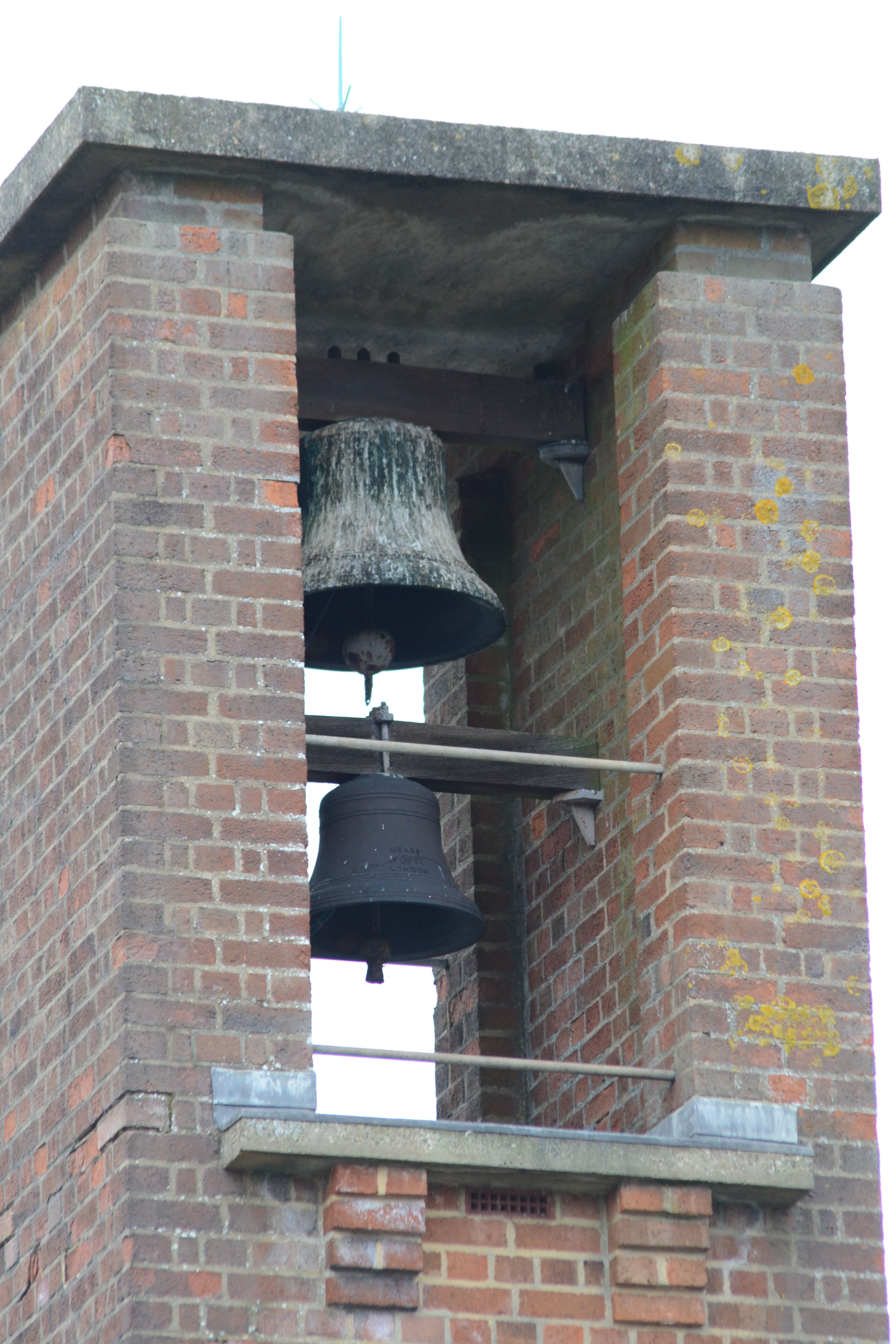

== See also ==
- List of places of worship in Crawley
- Listed buildings in Crawley
