= Mark Lemon =

English playwright and Editor of Punch

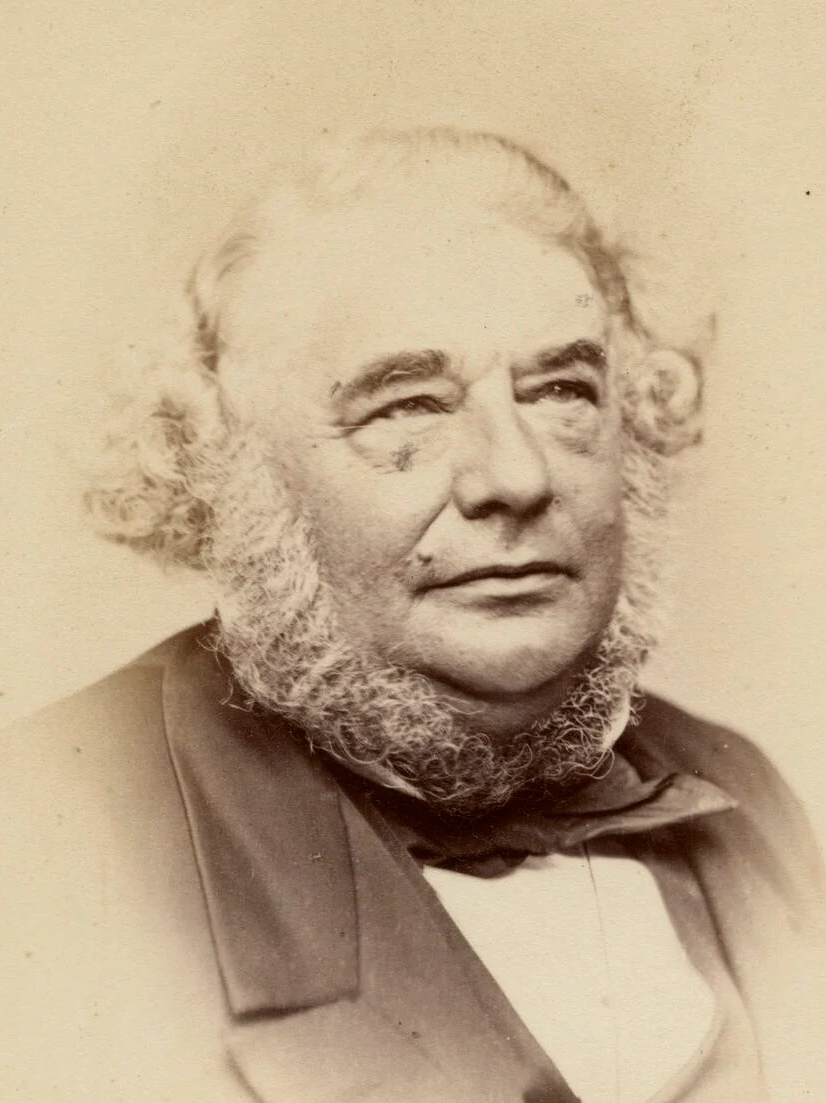
- Carte-de-visite by Elliott & Fry, 1860s.
- Born: 30 November 1809; London, England
- Died: 23 May 1870 (aged 60); Crawley, West Sussex, England
- Resting place: St Margaret's Church, Ifield
- Known for: Founding Punch magazine

Mark Lemon (30 November 1809, in London – 23 May 1870, in Crawley) was the founding editor of both Punch and The Field. He was also a writer of plays and verses.

== Biography ==
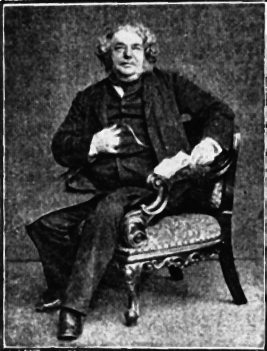
From M. H. Spielmann's The History of "Punch", 1895

Lemon was born in Marylebone, Westminster, Middlesex, on 30 November 1809. He was the son of Martin Lemon, a hop merchant, and Alice Collis. His parents married on 26 December 1808 at St Mary, Marylebone, Westminster. His father died in Hendon in 1818, and between 1817 and 1823 Lemon lived at Church Farmhouse, where a blue plaque commemorates him.

Lemon was educated at Cheam School, then in Surrey. This was then strictly for the sons of gentlemen only, and a boy had to leave when his father was found to be a tradesman, with a shop in London selling cutlery. It seems that the family background of young Lemon was not discovered.

At the age of 15, Lemon was sent to live in Boston, Lincolnshire, with his mother's brother Thomas Collis.

Lemon had a natural talent for journalism and the stage, and at 26 retired from less congenial business to devote himself to the writing of plays. More than sixty of his melodramas, operettas and comedies were produced in London, whilst at the same time he was contributing to a wide variety of magazines and newspapers.

He married Helen (Nelly) Romer, on 28 September 1839 in Kensington, London and had eight children – sons Mark, Frank and Henry, and daughters Alice, Betty, Helen, Mary and Kate. Frank died shortly after he was born. Betty married Sir Robert Romer and their son was Mark Lemon Romer.

In 1841 Lemon and Henry Mayhew conceived the idea of a humorous weekly paper to be called Punch, and when the first number was issued, in July 1841, were joint editors and with the printer and engraver equal owners. The paper was for some time unsuccessful, Lemon keeping it alive out of the profits of his plays. On the sale of Punch, Lemon became sole editor for the new proprietors. It remained under his control until his death, achieving remarkable popularity and influence.

Two other long-running magazines in which Lemon played a significant part were the Illustrated London News, the first publication to make use of pictures as well as text in reporting, which was founded by his friend Herbert Ingram, and The Field, of which he was founder editor (1853–57).

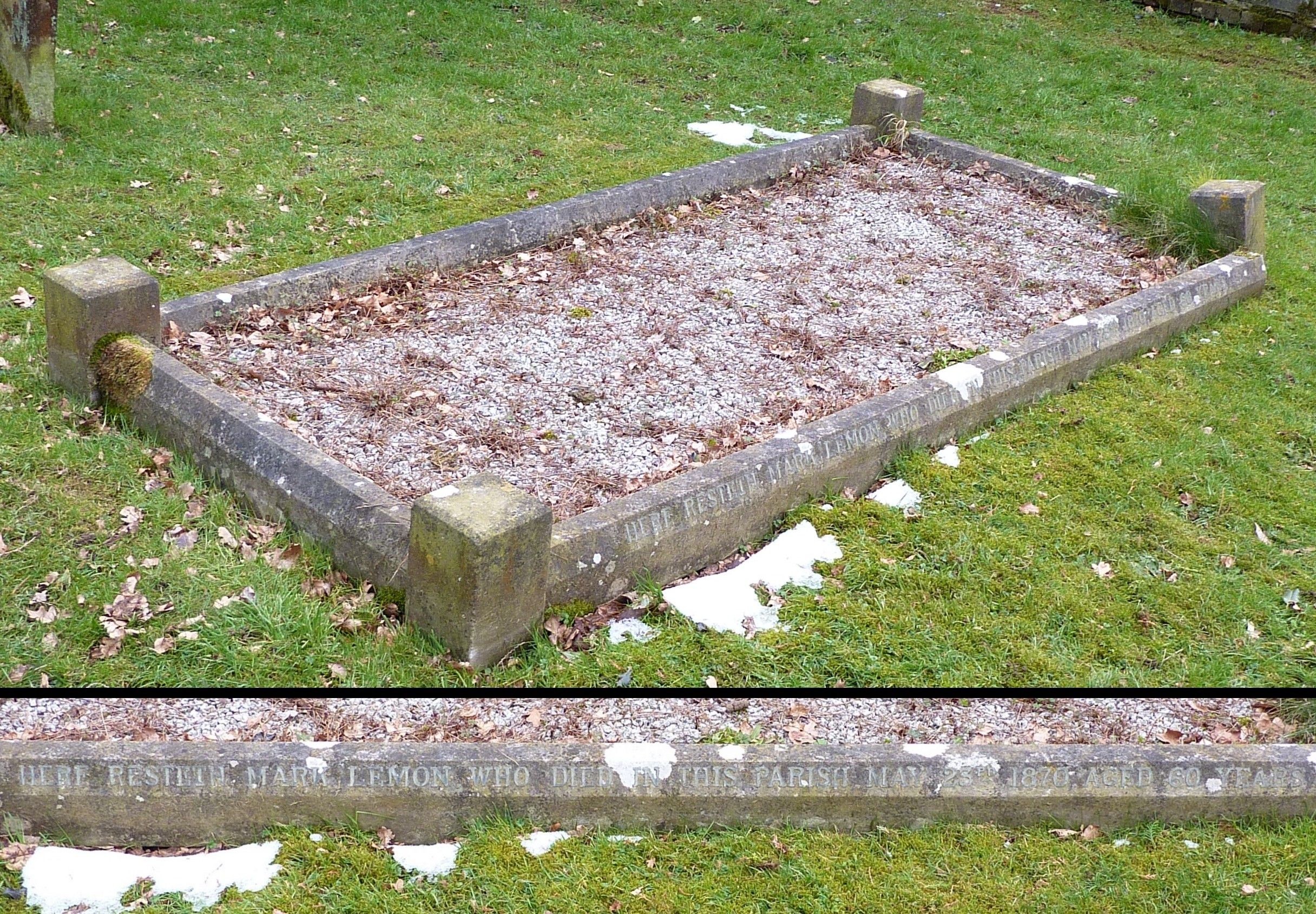
Mark Lemon's grave, St Margaret's Church, Ifield, West Sussex.

Lemon was an actor of ability, a pleasing lecturer and a successful impersonator of Shakespearian characters. He played in the 1851 production of Not So Bad As We Seem, a play written by Edward Bulwer featuring many notable Victorians, including Charles Dickens. He also wrote novelettes and lyrics, over a hundred songs, a few three-volume novels, several Christmas fairy tales and a volume of jests. He was a stalwart of the London gentlemen's Savage Club.

Lemon died in his adopted home town Crawley, West Sussex on 23 May 1870 and was buried in St Margaret's Church, Ifield. A blue plaque commemorates him outside The George Hotel, Crawley.

His daughter, Mary Mark-Lemon, was a successful songwriter, noted for "Daddy", with music by Arthur Henry Behrend.

== Works ==
- The Boys of London - The Steam Boat Call Boy (1844) Published in The Illuminated Magazine pp. 340–342

Attribution
