= List of conservation areas in Crawley =

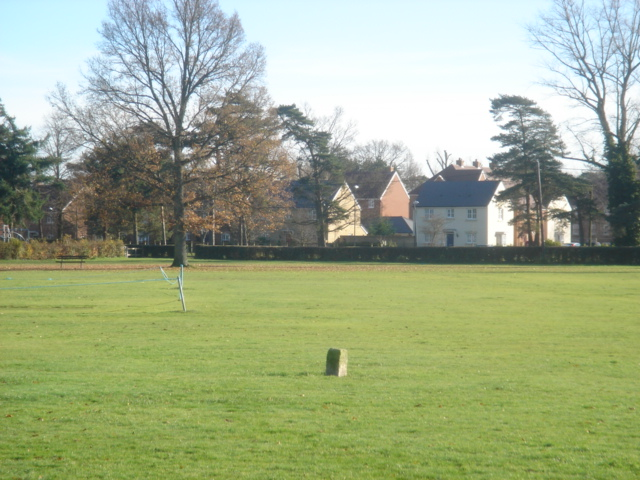
The Ifield Village conservation area consists of buildings of the 13th to 19th centuries around a village green.

As of April 2013, there are 11 conservation areas in the borough of Crawley in West Sussex, England. Crawley has ancient origins as a market town, but following centuries of gradual growth it was transformed in the postwar era when it was selected as a New Town. The population is now over 100,000. Several areas retain their long-established character and buildings of historic interest, and some postwar parts of the town have been designated as conservation areas because of their architectural and social importance.

The definition of a conservation area is a principally urban area "of special architectural or historic interest, the character or appearance of which it is desirable to preserve or enhance". Such areas are identified according to criteria defined by Sections 69 and 70 of the Planning (Listed Buildings and Conservation Areas) Act 1990. Crawley Borough Council is responsible for creating conservation areas within its boundaries. As well as following the statutory definition, it states that conservation area status is granted on the basis of "a number of factors and does not solely relate to the age of the buildings; for instance architectural interest and setting of an area are also important factors." Specific features of interest include historic street patterns, materials used in buildings, paths and boundaries, the character of the public realm, the relationship between buildings and surrounding open space, and "a strong sense of place". Conservation area status regulates but does not preclude new construction, demolition or redevelopment work.

== Overview ==
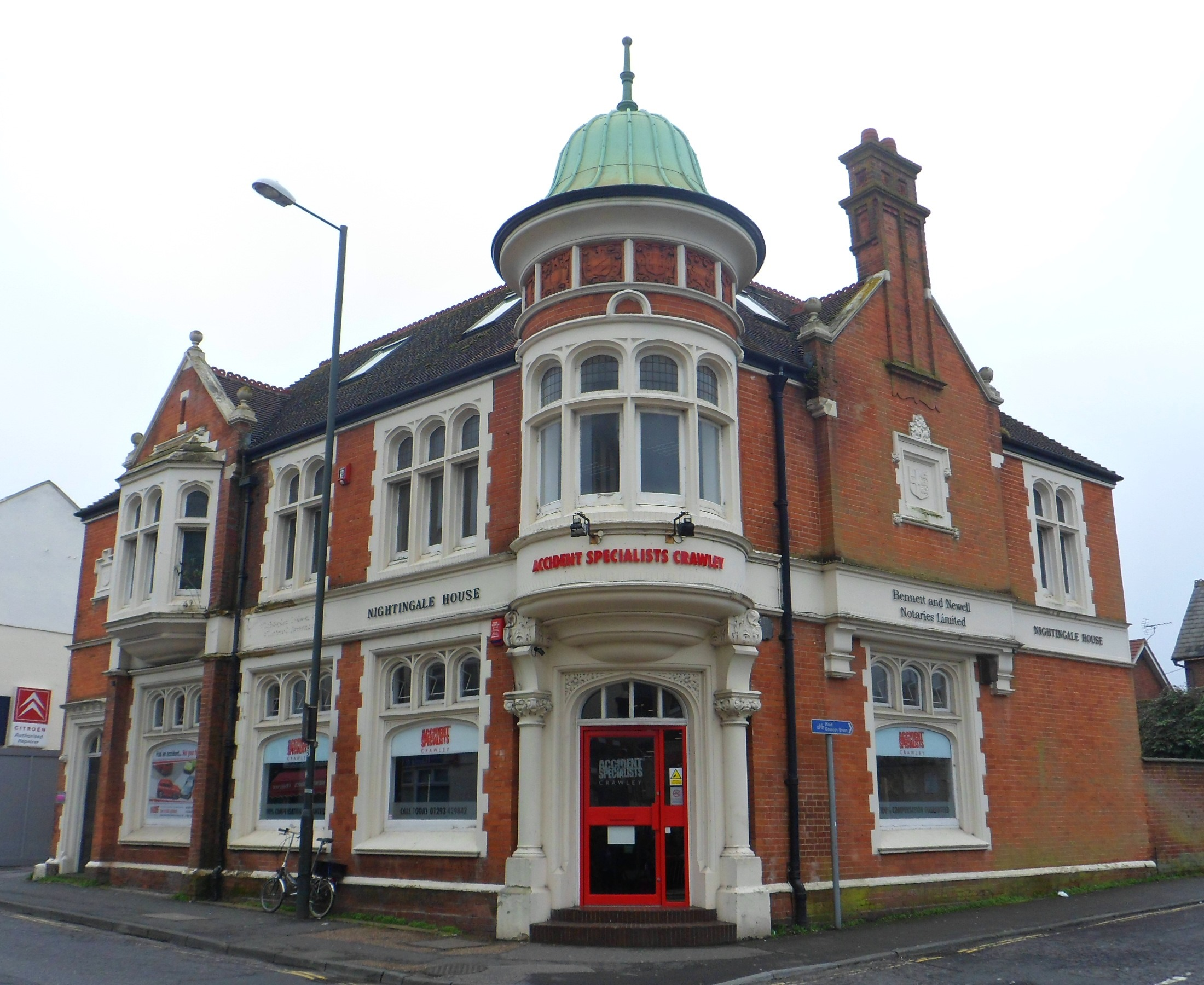
Buildings in the Brighton Road conservation area include Nightingale House (1901), which survived a demolition threat in 2008.

Present-day Crawley, whose population was 106,597 at the time of the 2011 United Kingdom census, was formed by the merging of the small market town of Crawley (which lay astride the main London–Brighton road), the village of Ifield to the west, the railway settlement of Three Bridges to the east, and the ancient village of Worth to the southeast, whose Saxon church was at the heart of a vast parish. This gradual and haphazard development was greatly accelerated from 1947 when a detailed masterplan was drawn up by the Commission for New Towns, which aimed to rehouse large numbers of people from war-damaged London slums in a series of self-contained new towns around the city. Crawley was the second such town to be designated, and over the next few decades 13 residential neighbourhoods, a large industrial estate, a new town centre and many other facilities were built around the existing development. Local governance—split across several county, district and parish councils—was consolidated into a new entity which took its present form, Crawley Borough Council, in 1974.

The council created its first conservation area in 1981 when it designated Ifield Village. Although Ifield became one of the 13 New Town neighbourhoods, the ancient village centre's character as a "small, scattered rural settlement" remained. It was recorded in the Domesday Book and had several ancient manors, inns and houses; and St Margaret's Church, the Anglican parish church, had 13th-century origins and replaced an even older wooden place of worship.

The Worth and High Street conservation areas also reflect the importance of the ancient features, buildings, townscapes and open space which survive from the medieval era and earlier in those parts of the borough. Worth's church, St Nicholas', is a "remarkable example of a pre-Conquest building" with a 10th- or 11th-century cruciform layout and apsidal east end. On the approach to it are 17th-century buildings of traditional local materials such as Street House (a former inn) and a timber-and-stone lychgate. Several other old houses, a moat and ancient trees contribute to the setting of the village, which until the late 20th century was still rural and isolated but which has now been surrounded by urban development (including, at close quarters, the M23 motorway). Crawley High Street, the natural halfway point between London and the fashionable seaside resort of Brighton, has been important since King John granted a charter for a weekly market there in 1202. No buildings of that antiquity survive, but St John the Baptist's Church (part of the High Street conservation area, although set back along a narrow path) has 14th-century fabric. Surviving medieval and later buildings, some of which are timber-framed hall houses, include the Ancient Priors, the Old Punch Bowl, Tree House, the Brewery Shades, the George Hotel ("Crawley's most celebrated building") and the White Hart Inn. Especially after it was turnpiked in 1770, the street became a popular stopping point for refreshment, entertainment, the changing of horses and other activities; inns, cafés and (later) cycling shops and garages proliferated among the mix of houses and shops which had developed over several centuries.

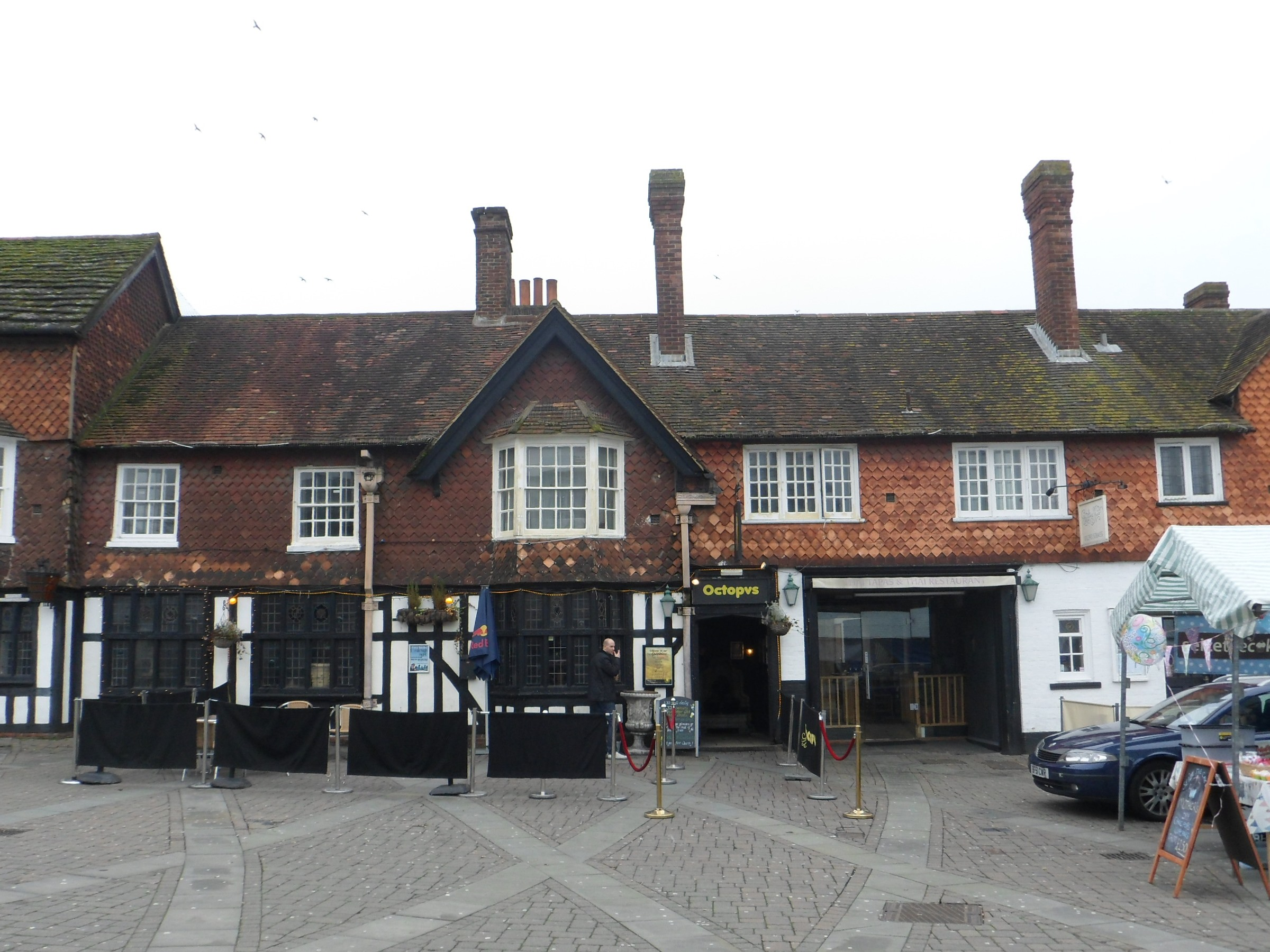
The George Hotel, part of the High Street conservation area, was first mentioned in 1579 and has expanded greatly since.

The Brighton Road and St Peter's conservation areas reflect the Victorian development of Crawley into a comfortable suburban town and its further expansion in the Edwardian era. "Charming" well-built houses in various styles, mostly by the two local building firms of James Longley and Richard Cook, spread down the Brighton Road and along nearby streets between 1870 and the early 20th century, after Crawley railway station was built. Distinctive buildings such as the Railway Hotel—now a pub—Nightingale House, built as a bank in 1901, the Grade II-listed railway signalbox and the former Imperial Cinema (with its "typical 1920s cinema architecture" of Classical-style arched windows, stone balustrade and open pediment) added to the area's character. Meanwhile, West Green was developing into a modest residential community around the core of an ancient settlement of "a few villagey cottages" on the Crawley–Ifield road. Typical Victorian housing was built in the second half of the 19th century, and St Peter's Church (1892–93, by W. Hilton Nash) was provided to serve the area. These older houses were retained when West Green was built up as Crawley New Town's first neighbourhood from the late 1940s, and together with the church they form the basis for the present conservation area.

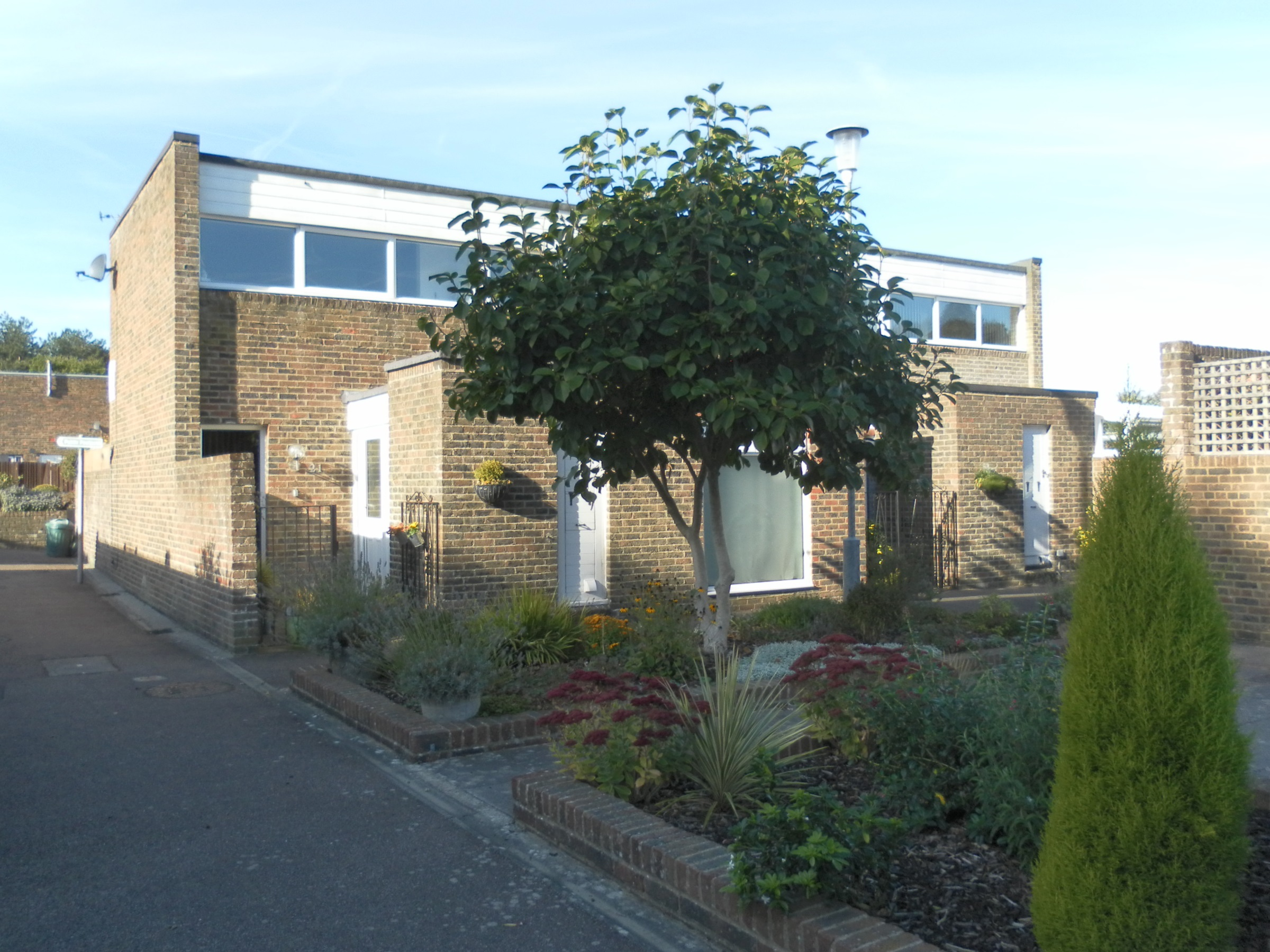
Distinctive flat-roofed dark brick houses set among landscaped pathways characterise the Forestfield area.

The other three conservation areas cover small areas of residential buildings of the 1930s (Dyers Almshouses), 1950s (Sunnymead Flats) and 1970s (Forestfield and Shrublands). The Dyers Almshouses moved to Crawley from London in 1939, and more were added over the next four decades. There are now 30 of the distinctive Arts and Crafts-style brick and tile buildings, all set round a formal quadrangle on a road behind the town centre. The six blocks of flats in the Sunnymead development were some of the first residential buildings of the New Town era: they were provided for construction workers. Crawley Borough Council still maintains them. In the Furnace Green neighbourhood (one of the later New Town developments, started in the late 1960s), Forestfield and Shrublands were designed by architecture firm Phippen Randall Parkes as two self-contained residential communities consisting of houses which were sold on a leasehold basis to residents by the housing association for which they were built. With their south-southeastward orientation and large areas of glazing, the architecturally distinctive pale concrete houses of Shrublands receive plenty of natural light, and each house and garden has a close relationship with the central area of green space. Forestfield's houses are grouped around areas of open space with pathways, and are of contrasting dark and pale brick. Car parking is extensive but well disguised. The layout was also designed with proximity to the ancient Tilgate Forest in mind: the houses have views into it, and paths lead directly in.

In 2010, Crawley Borough Council commissioned a study to investigate locally listed buildings and other heritage assets. This study examined several areas which had been suggested as possible conservation areas. Six were put forward for further investigation. In November 2010, one (Gossops Green Neighbourhood Centre) was withdrawn, but the other five (Hazelwick Road, Langley Lane, Malthouse Road, Southgate Neighbourhood Centre and West Street) were accepted. Three were to be entirely new conservation areas, and the other two would be extensions to existing areas. Public consultation took place in 2012 and revealed strong support for the council's proposals. After some amendments and further consultation, the final report was produced in March 2013. The proposals were accepted on 3 April 2013, and the council began the legal process of designating the new conservation areas. Hazelwick Road and Malthouse Road date from the Victorian and Edwardian periods and are principally residential, while the Southgate Neighbourhood Centre was one of the mixed-use areas created as part of the New Town masterplan. Langley Lane in Ifield, which has ancient origins, has been included within the Ifield Village conservation area, and the Victorian houses of West Street have now been added to the Brighton Road area.

== Conservation areas ==
Symbol	Key
(†)	This is classed as an extension to an existing conservation area rather than a separate area.

Name	Image	Area	Year	Notes	Refs
Brighton Road		Southgate	2009	This area consists of Victorian and Edwardian buildings immediately south of the level crossing where the Arun Valley Line meets the London–Brighton road. Large houses and commercial buildings of various types, mostly of brown and red brick and some with elements of the Classical style, are typical. Modern buildings, refronted shop units and ill-defined areas of car parking are considered to affect the area's appearance, though.	
Dyers Almshouses		Northgate	1996	This group of 30 architecturally distinctive almshouses are one of many works by local building firm Longley and Company. Built in three phases between 1939 and 1971, they combine the Arts and Crafts style with elements "reminiscent of rural Dutch cottage[s]". Large tile-hung gables, stock brick and intricate tall chimneys are prominent features. The houses were built for the Worshipful Company of Dyers, a London Livery Company.	
Forestfield and Shrublands		Furnace Green	1996	Architects Phippen Randall Parkes designed these two small and distinctive estates between 1965 and 1971. Shrublands was completed first, in 1968, and its design was based on suggestions made by members of the housing association for which it was built. These future residents were asked questions based on sociological theory. Open space was planned as an integral part of each estate, and the relationship between the houses and their surroundings (in particular the nearby ancient woodland of Tilgate Forest) is important. Forestfield has 125 houses in five equally sized clusters; Shrublands has 71 in a more informal layout. Both estates won design awards.	
Hazelwick Road		Three Bridges	2013	After Three Bridges railway station became a junction in the 1840s, the village of Three Bridges to the east of Crawley grew in importance. Fields were developed with terraced and semi-detached houses and some larger villas; Hazelwick Road, dating from the end of the 19th century and the first decade of the 20th, is an example of higher-class housing alongside the smaller accommodation for railway workers. Features include bay windows, brickwork in various colours and original sash windows.	
High Street		Town Centre	1986	The High Street and its buildings have been renewed and reconstructed regularly over the centuries, but it has always been of central importance to the town. The street widens halfway along, but no trace remains of the buildings that once occupied a central "island". Some houses became coaching inns when coach traffic thrived, and hotels or restaurants after it declined; others are now shops. Purpose-built shops such as Grand Parade followed in the 20th century. Several medieval hall houses survive.	
Ifield Village		Ifield	1981	The conservation area covers what was originally the central settlement in the large rural parish of Ifield, around the 13th-century St Margaret's Church (a replacement for a pre-Norman building). Many of the surrounding buildings are nationally or locally listed: the vicarage, the former school, the current and former Plough Inns, a house associated with Elizabeth Fry, and a 17th-century barn and granary which have been converted into a theatre. The village green, which retains an old boundary stone, is also within the conservation area.	
Langley Lane (†)		Ifield	2013	This long lane, no more than a tree-lined cul-de-sac, was built up from the 15th century and has buildings from that era to the present. The Grade I-listed Ifield Friends Meeting House (pictured) is 17th-century, and other listed buildings include Apple Tree Farm (at which substantial residential development took place in the early 21st century), Langley Grange, Finches Cottage and Old Inn Cottage. The lane forms an eastward extension to the Ifield Village conservation area.	
Malthouse Road		Southgate	2013	The building firm James Longley and Company was based in the vicinity of this road, and it was responsible for most of the terraced cottages, semi-detached houses, detached houses and large villas which still characterise it. The street curves from north to west, following ancient field boundaries. Development started in 1899. The five semi-detached villas at numbers 108–122 (pictured) have locally listed status.	
St Peter's		West Green	1996	The hamlet of West Green was named by 1532. Housing development in the second half of the 19th century caused it to merge with Crawley town centre to the east, and the growth prompted the opening of the "spacious" sandstone-built St Peter's Church in 1893. This forms the centre of the present conservation area. Brick cottages with contrasting quoins, porches and bargeboards are typical, and many open out straight on to the narrow streets. The area also has a commercial feel: some houses now have shop units at ground-floor level. Two pubs (including the locally listed Swan Inn) and a range of old trees enhance the area.	
Southgate Neighbourhood Centre		Southgate	2013	Each New Town neighbourhood centre had the same general set of buildings—a church, pub, shopping parade and a community centre. The planners tried to vary their designs and grouping as much as possible; the mid-1950s shops at Wakehams Drive in Southgate take the form of an arcade with flats above, and St Mary's Church (1958) is a striking concrete and glass Modernist building with a large metal spire and a tunnel-vaulted roof. The council describes it as "one of the most successful neighbourhood centres".	
Sunnymead Flats		West Green	1997	Inspired by the Festival of Britain in 1951 and some contemporary flats in Stockholm, these six y-shaped blocks of three-storey flats are built of brightly painted rendered concrete and were erected to house the builders who were working on early New Town residential developments. They are set in lawned grounds with trees and shrubs.	
West Street (†)		Southgate	2013	Like the Brighton Road area, of which this proposed conservation area forms a westward extension, West Street developed in the late Victorian era. Terraced and semi-detached houses with multicoloured brickwork are typical of the street. The extension would stretch into part of Springfield Road, whose houses are larger and have features such as sash windows and bargeboards.	
Worth		Worth	1987	The centrepiece of the conservation area, the ancient village and its vast parish is "one of the most powerful of Anglo-Saxon churches", St Nicholas' (pictured). Other than a tower added in 1871 by Anthony Salvin, little has changed for 1000 years. The ancient Forest of Worth spread across southern Surrey and northern Sussex, and ancient trees (some protected by TPOs) are important in the conservation area. The former rectory and a former toll house are among the other important buildings.	

== Map ==
Location of conservation areas in the Borough of Crawley. 1 = Brighton Road; 2 = Dyers Almshouses; 3 = Forestfield and Shrublands; 4 = Hazelwick Road; 5 = High Street; 6 = Ifield Village; 7 = Malthouse Road; 8 = St Peter's; 9 = Southgate Neighbourhood Centre; 10 = Sunnymead Flats; 11 = Worth

== See also ==
- List of conservation areas in Brighton and Hove
- Listed buildings in Crawley
- Locally listed buildings in Crawley
