= Dyers Almshouses =

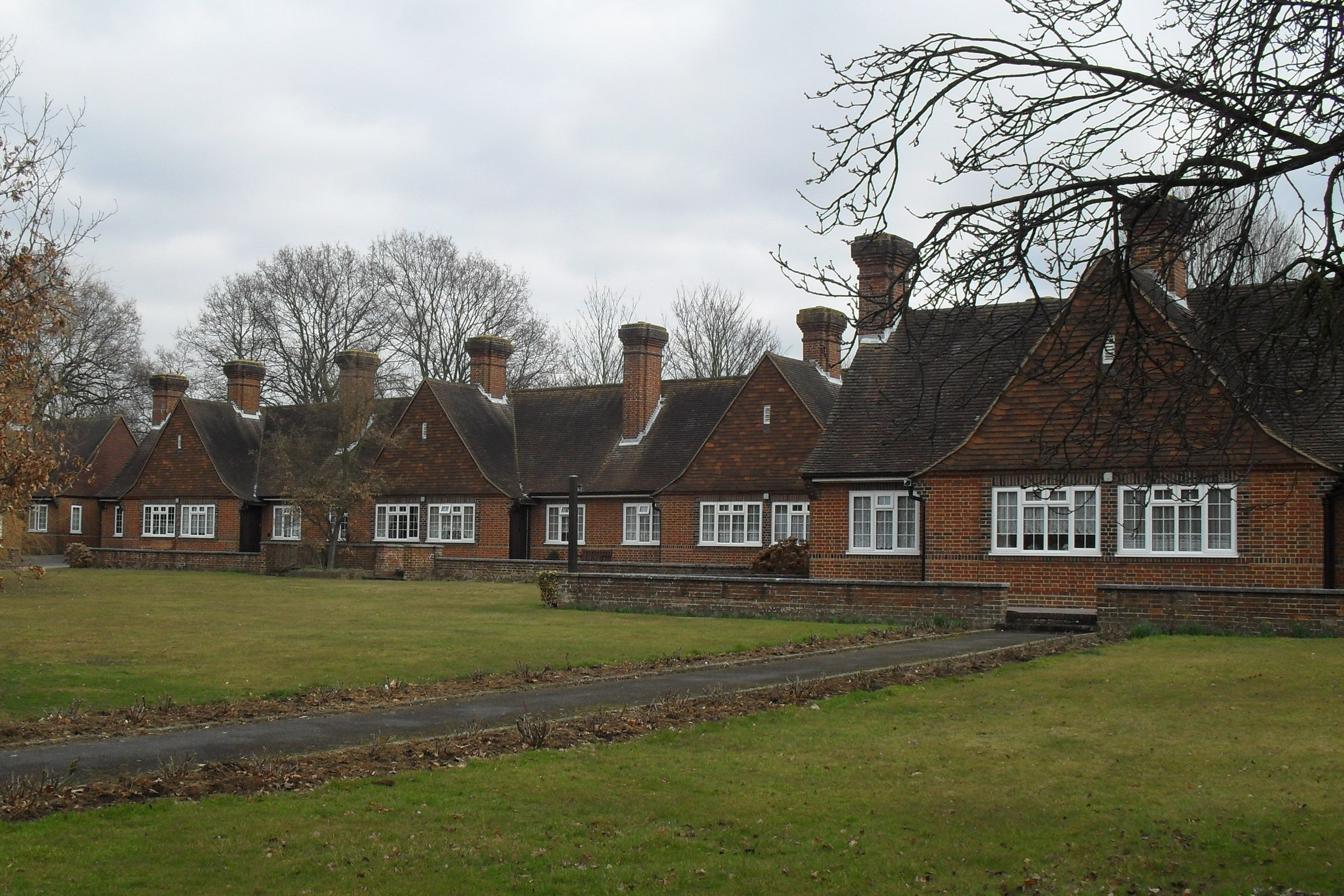
- The north side of the almshouses

- Location of the almshouses within Crawley

General information
- Type: Almshouse
- Architectural style: Dutch Vernacular/Arts and Crafts
- Location: Northgate Road, Northgate RH10 1YD, Crawley, England
- Coordinates: 51.1184°N 0.1870°W
- Groundbreaking: 1939
- Opened: October 1940 (first block)
- Owner: Worshipful Company of Dyers

Design and construction
- Architecture firm: Bertram and Company (W.H. Hatchard-Smith)
- Main contractor: Longley and Company
- Designations: Locally listed building

The Dyers Almshouses are a group of 30 almshouses belonging to the Worshipful Company of Dyers, a London Livery Company. Built in three stages between 1939 and 1971, they are located close to the town centre of Crawley, a New Town and borough in West Sussex, England. The distinctive Arts and Crafts-influenced buildings are arranged around a courtyard on a street close to Crawley town centre, and have been granted conservation area and locally listed building status.

== History ==
The Worshipful Company of Dyers received its royal charter in 1471, but the profession had a presence in the City of London from the late 12th century. The company's first almshouse dated from 1545, when Robert Tyrwhitt MP gave the company a messuage in London. Over the next 200 years, another 25 houses were built across London. In 1840, a group of 26 almshouses were built in Islington in North London to replace these older buildings.

Before World War II, Crawley was a slowly growing market town based around a north–south High Street. Beyond the buildings fronting the road, ancient fields and allotments survived. Towards the north end of the street, a footpath ran southeastwards between buildings and through the fields. In the 1930s this footpath was upgraded into a long cul-de-sac called Northgate Road, taking its name from the nearby northern tollgate on the High Street—part of the main London–Brighton road which was turnpiked in the 18th century.

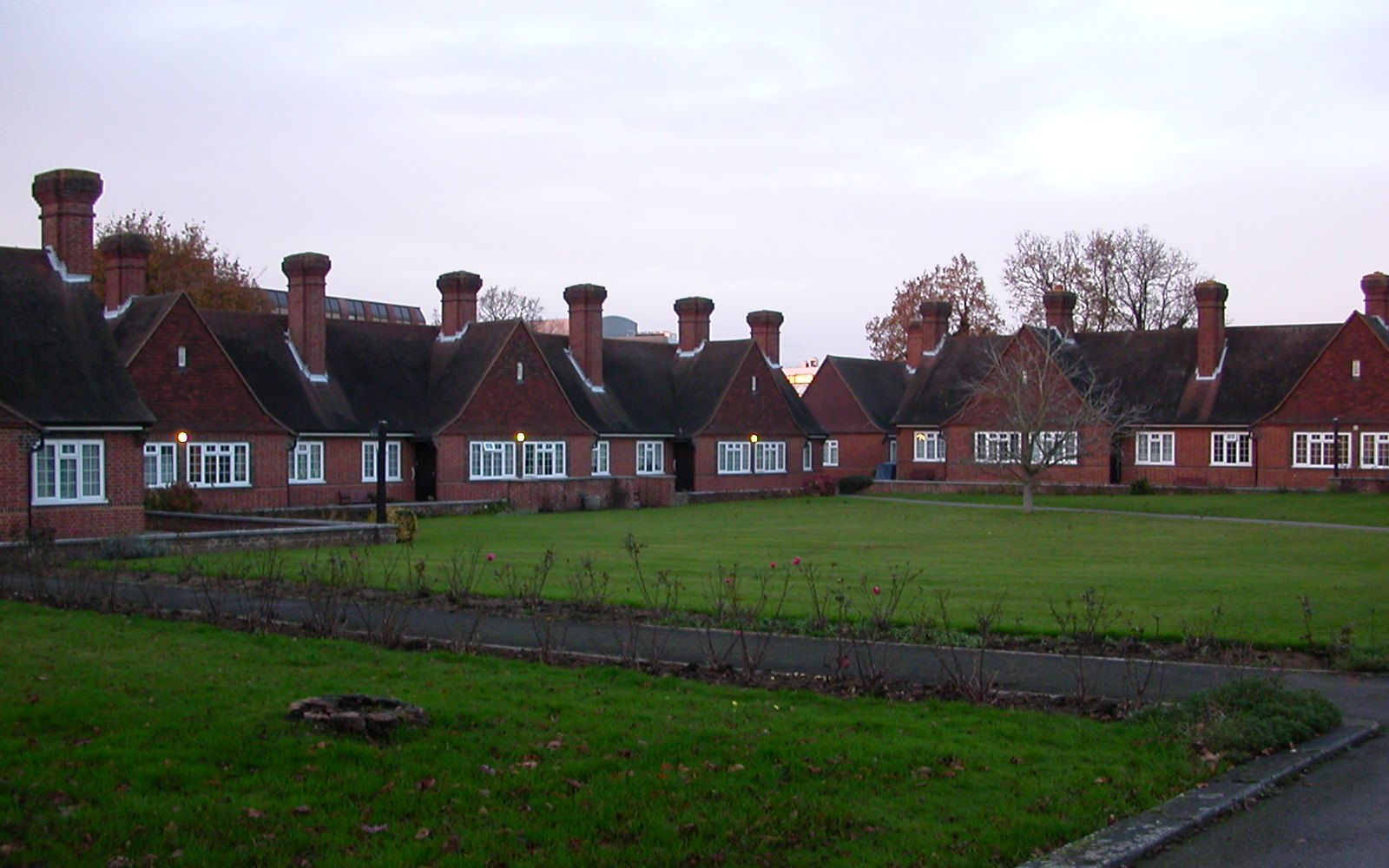
The almshouses are arranged around a landscaped courtyard.

The road was mostly developed with "typical 1930s" terraced and semi-detached houses, but a site on the north side was acquired by the Worshipful Company of Dyers in 1939 with money received from the sale of the Islington almshouses. They commissioned London-based architects Bertram and Company (the scheme architect was W.H. Hatchard-Smith) to design, and Crawley firm Longley and Company to build, ten new houses and accommodation for a warden. Construction was stopped temporarily when World War II broke out, but Longley and Company resumed a few weeks later when it became clear that "the expected bombing and gassing" was not imminent. These first houses were finished in October 1940. Another 16 houses were built in the same style in 1952 when money was left to the company, and in 1971 (the quincentennial of the granting of the royal charter) another four houses were added. Two are now used for other purposes (a common room and accommodation for a matron), leaving 28 in use by residents. A mixture of couples and single people occupy the houses; the criteria set by the company are that applicants should be "of good character and modest means". Applicants must write to the Company clerk and go through an interview, after which they are placed on a list for a house. Most residents are retired people who have previously lived in Crawley or who have family connections to the town.

Modernisation work in the early 21st century has included the replacement of all windows with double glazing, a new heating system, rewiring and improvements to the drains. A planning application was made in 2011 to convert some of the landscaped area in front of the almshouses into a gravel car park for up to ten vehicles. Parking in the area had long been a problem: a "controlled parking zone" was put in place on Northgate Road in 2002, limiting parking to 16 spaces. The almshouses were excluded from this because few residents had cars and Crawley town centre was considered close enough to be accessible: it is 440 yards (400 m) away. Subsequently, four parking permits were granted for almshouse residents, and some visitor permits were allocated as well—but this facility was taken away in 2010 because of increasing demand for spaces. Extension of the adjacent Three Bridges controlled parking zone was discussed as an alternative.

== Architecture ==
W.H. Hatchard-Smith of London architects Bertram and Company designed the Dyers Almshouses, which are "a good example of a comprehensively planned group of residential buildings" and are a significant historical feature in relation to Crawley's transition from market town to carefully planned postwar New Town. In design, they share features with "rural Dutch cottages" while being mostly in the Arts and Crafts style. There are no other buildings of this style either in Crawley or in nearby areas of Sussex. At the time they were built, local building firm Longley and Company were working on dozens of commissions in the area, particularly for the Crawley Development Corporation in relation to the New Town masterplan, but most of their work was architecturally unassuming: New Town buildings were typically "run-of-the-mill, curtain-walled ... [with] a reassuring uniformity with nothing regimented about it". Accordingly, the almshouses stand out: they have large and ornate brick chimney-stacks, steep roofs reaching nearly to ground level, deep tile-hung gables and stock brick walls in two shades of red (darker brick is used around the windows). Heavy Tudor-style oak doors with iron door furniture survive. Some of the iron drainpipes from the old almshouses at Islington were apparently recovered when they were sold and were reinstated on the new buildings: several bear the date 1852. The buildings surround a quadrangle-style courtyard with formal planting, low walls, fences and hedges, telephone boxes and a former boiler-house.

== Heritage ==
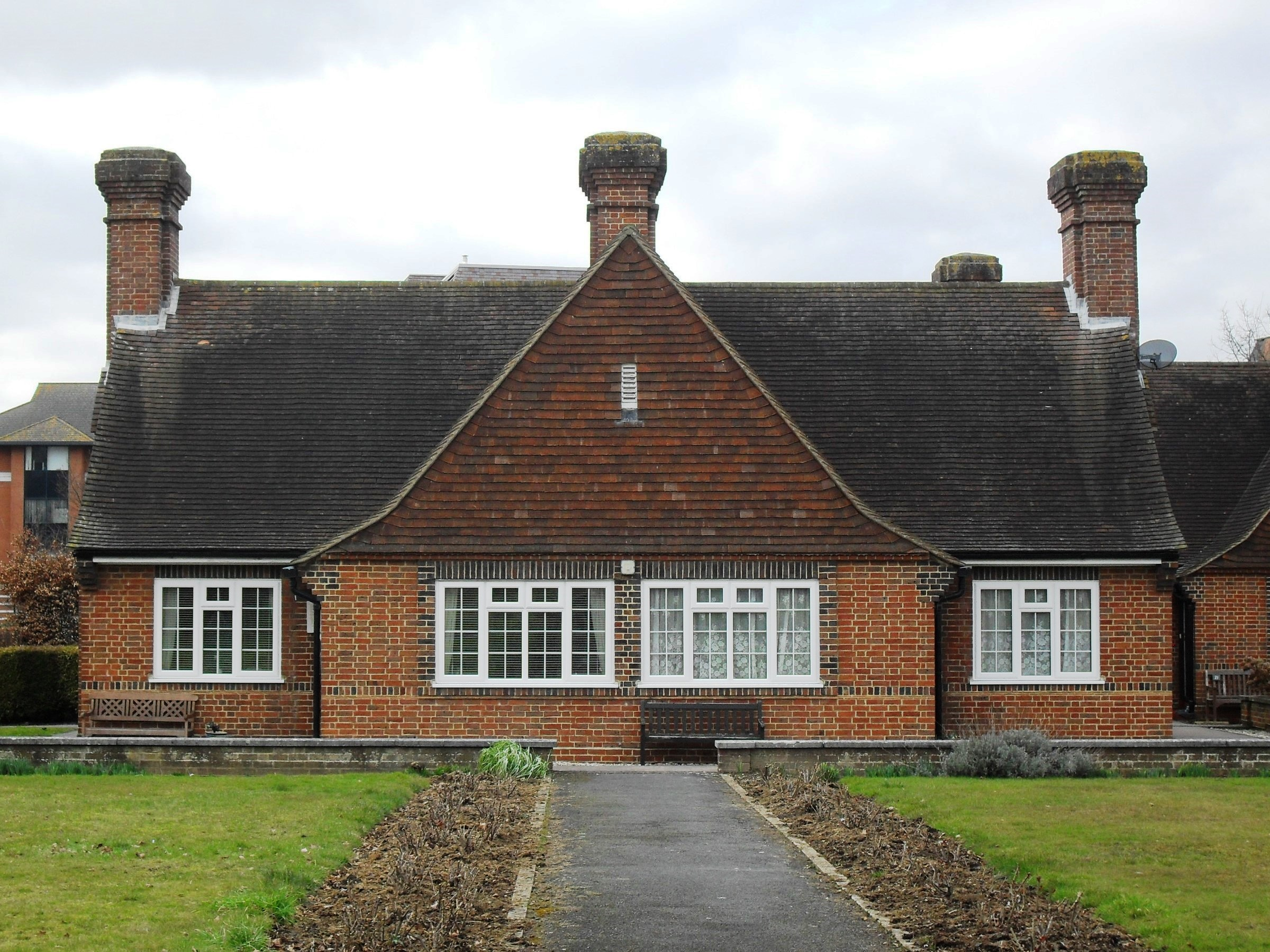
The houses have large tile-hung gables and chimney-stacks.

Crawley Borough Council designated the Dyers Almshouses as a conservation area on 15 October 1996, and its formal conservation area character statement was ratified on 18 November 1997. As of March 2013, it is one of eight conservation areas in the borough of Crawley, although a consultation is ongoing which could result in five new areas being designated (two of which are extensions to existing conservation areas). The definition of a conservation area is a principally urban area "of special architectural or historic interest, the character or appearance of which it is desirable to preserve or enhance". Such areas are identified according to criteria defined by Sections 69 and 70 of the Planning (Listed Buildings and Conservation Areas) Act 1990. Crawley Borough Council adds to the statutory definition by stating that the status is granted on the basis of "a number of factors and does not solely relate to the age of the buildings; for instance architectural interest and setting of an area are also important factors." In granting conservation area status, the council aimed to "protect the distinctive character and appearance of the Almshouses and their landscaped trees and gardens" and to ensure that any development in the surrounding area was appropriate and had no negative impact—especially as to the east lies a site earmarked for large-scale residential development.

Collectively, the almshouses are also one of 58 locally listed buildings in Crawley. This defines them as "building[s ...] that, whilst not statutorily listed by the Secretary of State, the council considers to be an important part of Crawley's heritage due to [their] architectural, historic or archaeological significance". Crawley Borough Council administers the selection and deselection process, defines the criteria for inclusion, and produces and updates the local list.

== See also ==
- List of almshouses in the United Kingdom
- List of conservation areas in Crawley
- Locally listed buildings in Crawley
- Media related to Dyers Almshouses at Wikimedia Commons
