= Northgate, West Sussex =

Neighbourhood in Crawley, England

Coordinates: 51.1314°N 0.1768°W

Northgate
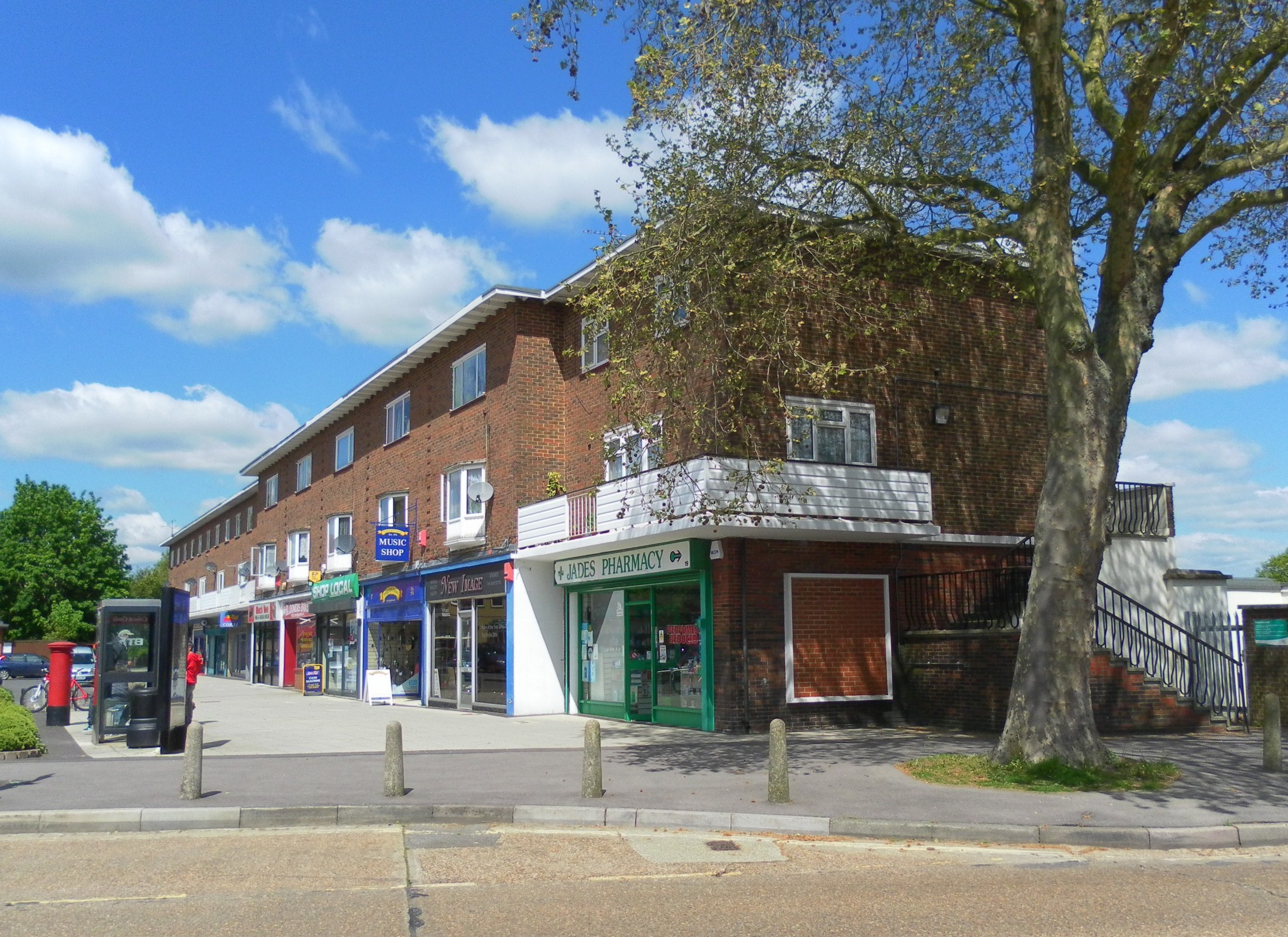
- The early 1950s shopping parade at Woodfield Road, Northgate

- Location within West Sussex
- OS grid reference: TQ275385
- District: Crawley
- Shire county: West Sussex
- Region: South East
- Country: England
- Sovereign state: United Kingdom
- Post town: Crawley
- Postcode district: RH10
- Dialling code: 01293
- Police: Sussex
- Fire: West Sussex
- Ambulance: South East Coast
- UK Parliament: Crawley

Northgate is one of the 14 residential neighbourhoods in Crawley, a town and borough in West Sussex, England. Crawley was planned and laid out as a New Town after the Second World War, based on the principle of self-contained neighbourhoods surrounding a town centre of civic and commercial buildings. Northgate was one of the four in the "inner ring" closest to the town centre, and was the second to be completed: almost all building work on the 168-acre (68 ha) site took place in the first half of the 1950s.

Northgate is bordered by West Green to the west, Langley Green to the north, Three Bridges to the east and the town centre and Southgate to the south. It is one of the smaller neighbourhoods in the town, but has the standard range of buildings as proposed in the 1940s masterplan: churches, a pub, a shopping parade, a primary school, and housing of various styles and layouts. Some older, pre-New Town buildings remain, including three with listed status and the locally listed Dyers Almshouses, which form part of the surviving interwar development in this part of the town.

== History ==
For most of its history, Crawley was a slowly growing market town whose focus was the north–south High Street, part of the main London to Brighton road. This was turnpiked in 1770, and at the northern and southern limits of the parish tollgates were erected—the North Gate and the South Gate. The section of road north of Crawley, called London Road, was widened in the early 1930s and bypassed a few years later to form the present A23. The tollgate was close to Boscobel House, a 17th-century timber-framed house which is now a listed building, and a long-established coaching inn called the Rising Sun. In the New Town era the inn was converted into a restaurant and later demolished, along with most of the other buildings along this section of London Road (including a public hall called Victoria Hall and a London Transport bus garage).

The area now covered by the Northgate neighbourhood was, until World War II, an area of mostly open land lying northeast of the town centre, whose focus was still the ancient High Street and its northward continuation London Road. Much of the area was covered by Woolborough Farm, part of the Crabbet Park estate which had been owned by Wilfrid Scawen Blunt and his family. (Note: The Blunts were a prominent Roman Catholic family. At the request of their late mother, Wilfrid and his brother founded the Friary Church of St Francis and St Anthony in Crawley town centre.) Most of the estate was auctioned in 1916. The farm and its facilities were described in the auction catalogue as comprising "a picturesque farmhouse, two cottages and homestead of agricultural buildings, together with 138 acres (56 ha) of arable land, 71 acres (29 ha) of well-timbered and shaded pastures and cool meadows, [and] two pieces of woodland". None of this survives, apart from in the name of Woolborough Road: postwar housing now covers the land.

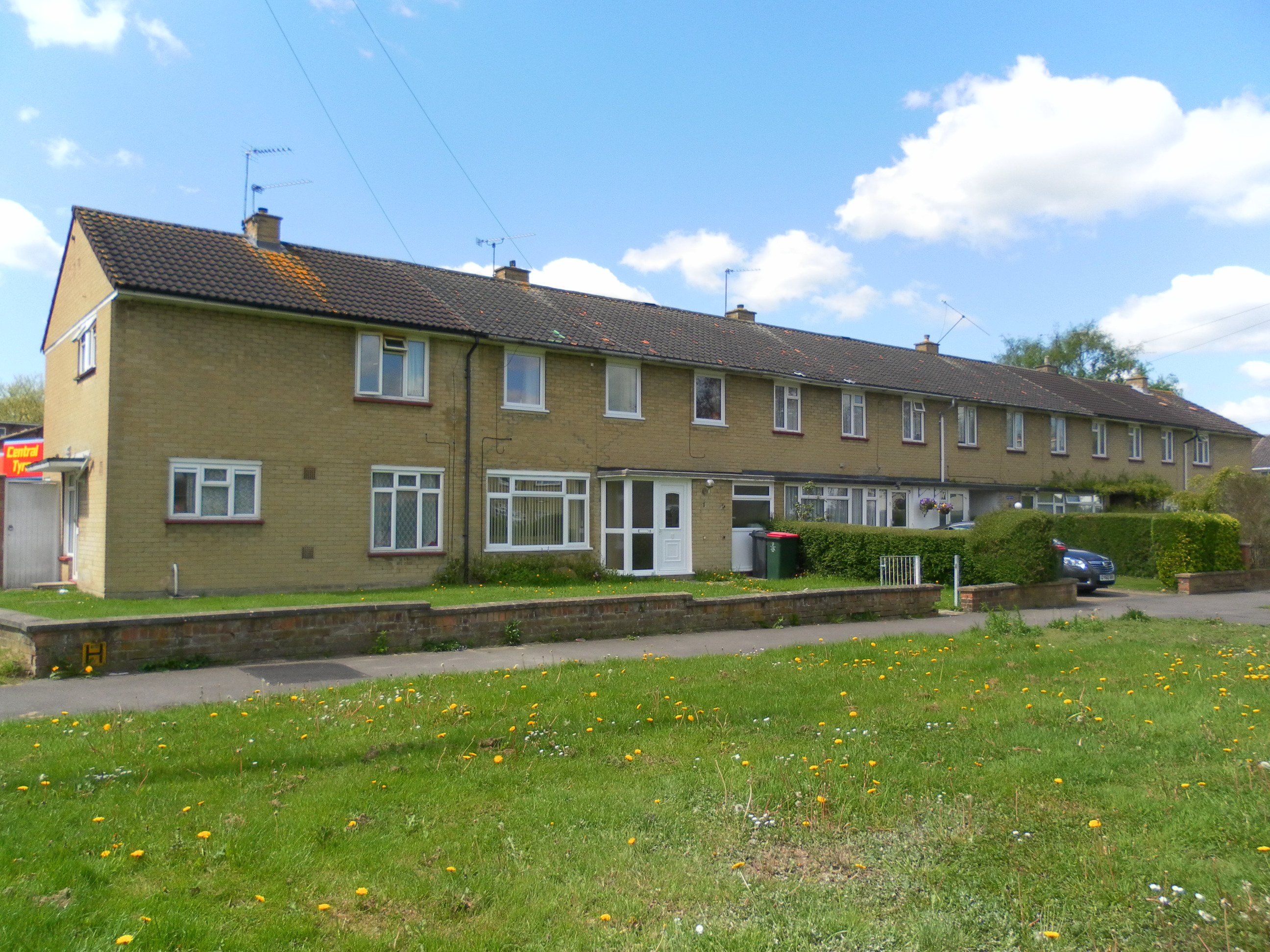
Early 1950s terraced housing on Woodfield Road, with extensive green space in front

The fields of the Crabbet Park estate were interspersed with allotments, and after the estate was broken up some housing was built, mostly directly off the London Road: Tushmore Lane, Cobbles Crescent and Woolborough Road had interwar ribbon development, there was some opposite The Sun Inn at the south end of London Road before it became Crawley High Street, and some "typical 1930s housing" on Green Lane. Altogether, 229 houses existed in the designated area at the start of World War II. A group of almshouses were built in 1939–40 on Northgate Road for the Worshipful Company of Dyers, a London livery company, which had moved from an older building in Islington.

Crawley was designated as a New Town in January 1947 after the New Towns Act 1946 identified it as a suitable site for one. Crawley Development Corporation was formed, led by the architect Thomas Bennett, and planner Anthony Minoprio provided a master plan for the town's development. He proposed a double ring of nine neighbourhoods surrounding an extended town centre. Northgate was to form the northern part of the inner ring, between the town centre and the northern section of the planned Crawley ring road.

Crawley Development Corporation's second annual report (1949) stated that Northgate was the second planned neighbourhood of nine, after West Green. Although 13 neighbourhoods were built in the end, (Note: A fourteenth, Forge Wood, is under construction as of 2025.) the order of construction of the early neighbourhoods remained unchanged. Work got underway in 1950, when 162 houses were built. A higher proportion of flats was provided than elsewhere in Crawley: one-quarter of the residential units built in the early years were flats, and flats eventually made up 13% of Northgate's housing stock overall. Crawley Development Corporation also built 142 concrete houses, unique in the town, in 1955.

Each New Town neighbourhood was to have a "neighbourhood centre" with shops, one or more churches, a pub, a primary school and a community centre. Work started on Northgate's in 1952 and the 13 shops were completed in 1953. Northgate suffered from the same problems and inconveniences in its first years as the other early neighbourhoods. No pavements were provided; streets lacked lighting and were either dusty or muddy; and potholes were common. There were also design errors at the main shopping parade: the pillar box was erected outside a chemist's shop instead of the post office, and all of the flats above the shops were mistakenly given the same door lock and key.

Queen Elizabeth II visited Crawley in June 1958, principally to open Gatwick Airport; but she visited Northgate and toured the Territorial Army centre in Kilnmead among other places.

== Location within Crawley ==
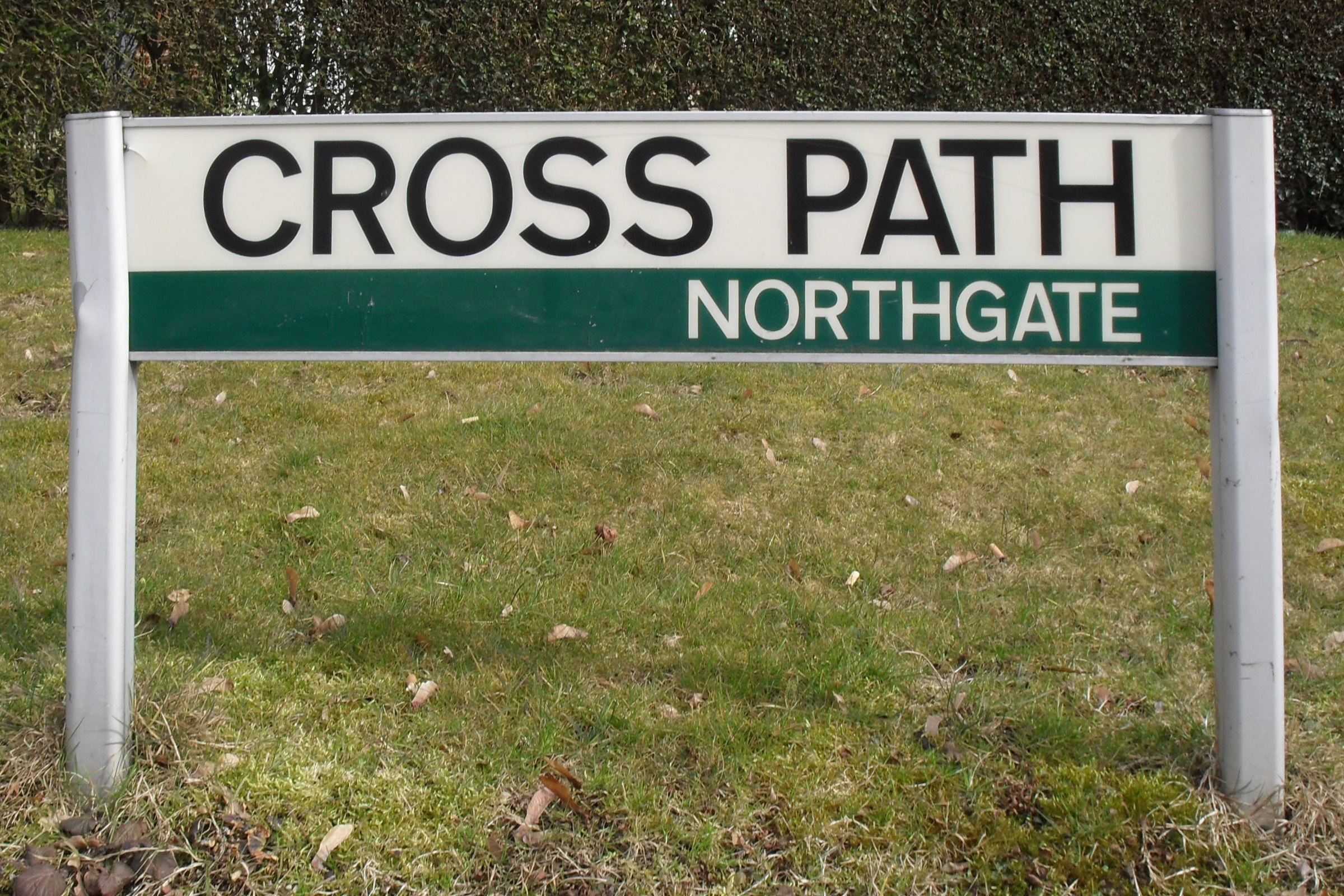
Northgate street sign

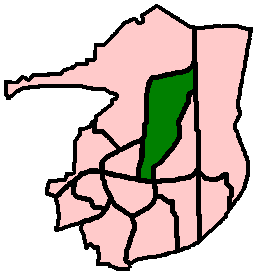
The Crawley Borough area, showing the 13 neighbourhoods; Northgate (including the town centre and Manor Royal industrial estate) is shown in pine green

The designated area of Crawley New Town according to Anthony Minoprio's masterplan was 5,920 acres (2,400 ha), of which 4,000 acres (1,600 ha) was to be developed at first. Northgate was to cover 168 acres (68 ha) immediately north of the expanded town centre. Anticlockwise from the south, the neighbourhood is bounded by The Boulevard (forming the northern limit of the town centre), Northgate Avenue (the A2004), Crawley Avenue (the A2011) and London Road, historically the main north–south route through the town but now bypassed and downgraded.

When the New Town was planned, each neighbourhood was allocated a colour, which appears on street name signs together with the neighbourhood's name. Northgate's colour is pine green.

== Governance ==
When Crawley Urban District was formed in May 1956, it was divided into eight wards whose boundaries were identical with those of eight of the extant and planned neighbourhoods. By 1983, nine years after the district became a borough, the town had thirteen wards. This position remained the same until an electoral review in 2002, which created two new wards. Throughout these changes, Northgate's ward boundaries remained the same. As well as the residential part of the neighbourhood, they cover the town centre to the south and the Manor Royal industrial estate to the north. The ward elects two councillors. In 2002 it was stated that the electorate in Northgate was 3,515 people, rising to an expected 3,918 in 2006; this made it one of the smallest wards in the town.

== Demography ==
The administrative ward of Northgate covers the residential neighbourhood, the town centre and Manor Royal industrial estate. Wards are used for collecting census and other statistical and demographic data. Northgate's population was 5,298 at the time of the 2011 United Kingdom census. The ward covers 430.7 hectares (1,064 acres), giving a population density of 12.3 inhabitants per hectare (5.0/acre), but much of the area covered by the ward is non-residential. (Note: If Northgate's residential area is defined as the 168 acres (68 ha) designated in the masterplan, the population density would be 77 inhabitants per hectare (31/acre).) At the time of the 2011 census Crawley as a whole had 106,597 residents and a population density of 23.7 inhabitants per hectare (9.6/acre).

At the census date there were 2,259 households in Northgate, of which 1,041 (46%) were owned by the occupier, 592 (26%) were rented from Crawley Borough Council or another public-sector landlord, 550 (24%) were rented privately and 33 (1.5%) were occupied rent-free. These proportions were significantly different from the housing tenure mix of Crawley as a whole, where 59% of residences were owned by the occupier, 24% were socially rented (from the council or another public body), 14.5% were privately rented and 1.2% were occupied rent-free. Housing types in Northgate were also different from in Crawley as a whole. Detached, semi-detached and terraced houses made up 8.3%, 17% and 38.4% respectively of the housing in Northgate, 32.9% of residences were flats in purpose-blocks, 2% were flats above commercial premises, and 1.3% were converted premises such as bedsits. In Crawley overall, detached, semi-detached and terraced houses made up 13.9%, 20.7% and 41.6% of the housing stock respectively; 22.3% of residences were in purpose-built flats; 0.5% were flats above commercial premises, and 0.9% were converted premises of other types.

According to the census, 74% of Northgate residents were White, 18.9% were Asian or Asian-British, 3.2% were Black or Black-British, 2.6% were mixed-race and 1.2% were from another ethnic background. The proportion of white people was lower, and that of Asian people higher, than in Crawley overall; other proportions were comparable to Crawley as a whole. Northgate's age profile at the census date was slightly older than that of Crawley as a whole, in common with the other inner neighbourhoods: 19.1% of residents were under 18 years old, 21.8% were between 18 and 29 years old, 41.4% were between 30 and 59, and 17.8% were 60 or older. The corresponding proportions for the borough overall were 23.3%, 17.1%, 42.3% and 17.4%. The mean and median ages were both about one year higher in Northgate than in Crawley as a whole.

Northgate was the second of the three earliest New Town neighbourhoods, all of which "were intended to house the builders of the New Town and the earliest unskilled settlers". The mix of occupations in the neighbourhood still reflects this: there are lower proportions of residents working in the highest categories of the census-defined hierarchy of occupations, (Note: Managers, directors and senior officials; professional occupations; and associate professional and technical occupations.) and higher proportions in the lowest categories, (Note: Sales and customer service occupations; process plant and machine operatives; and elementary occupations.) than in the borough as a whole.

== Buildings and facilities ==
St Elizabeth's Church was built in 1958 for Northgate's Anglican worshippers. It was part of the parish of St John the Baptist's Church, Crawley. The building was extended in the mid-1960s. It is a simple brick hall with windows in the clerestory and a small flèche on the roof. Its role as a church has been downgraded since 2005, when weekly services ceased; occasional services are still held, but its principal use is now by New Generation Performing Arts, formerly the Louise Ryrie School of Dance and Drama. The parish of St Richard's Church, Three Bridges now covers Northgate and is involved with New Generation, which it describes as "a Christian performing arts group for children and young people". Crawley's main Methodist church, St Paul's, was built in the neighbourhood centre in 1953–55. A new church was built alongside in 1966 and the original building became the church hall. The 1966 building is polygonal and has a multi-gabled copper roof. There is exposed timberwork inside. A Kingdom Hall was built for Jehovah's Witnesses on a nearby site in 1983. It was registered for worship in April 1983 (originally on behalf of the Ifield Congregation of Jehovah's Witnesses) and for marriages in 1991.

Separate infants and junior schools were opened by West Sussex County Council in 1954, replacing a temporary school provided two years previously. They became a first school and a middle school respectively when education facilities in the town were reconfigured in 1971. Like the other New Town schools, it was designed by West Sussex county architect F.R. Steele. The schools have now been amalgamated into one entity called Northgate Primary School; it takes children from ages 3 (nursery class) to 11 (Year 6).

Many of the neighbourhood pubs made architectural reference to the Regency style and have been altered over the years. The example at Northgate, the Black Dog, has a "jolly Regency bow". A temporary hut for community activities was built in Northgate by 1954; it was replaced by the present community centre, a permanent building, in 1963. The following year, its lease was one of the first to be taken on by the Crawley Council for Voluntary Service, which operated all the neighbourhoods' community centres by the mid-1980s. Also in 1964 a separate youth club building was erected.

There is a Territorial Army centre on Kilnmead. It is the battalion headquarters of 103 Battalion, Royal Electrical and Mechanical Engineers. The building also houses an Army Careers Information Office.

Buildings in Northgate
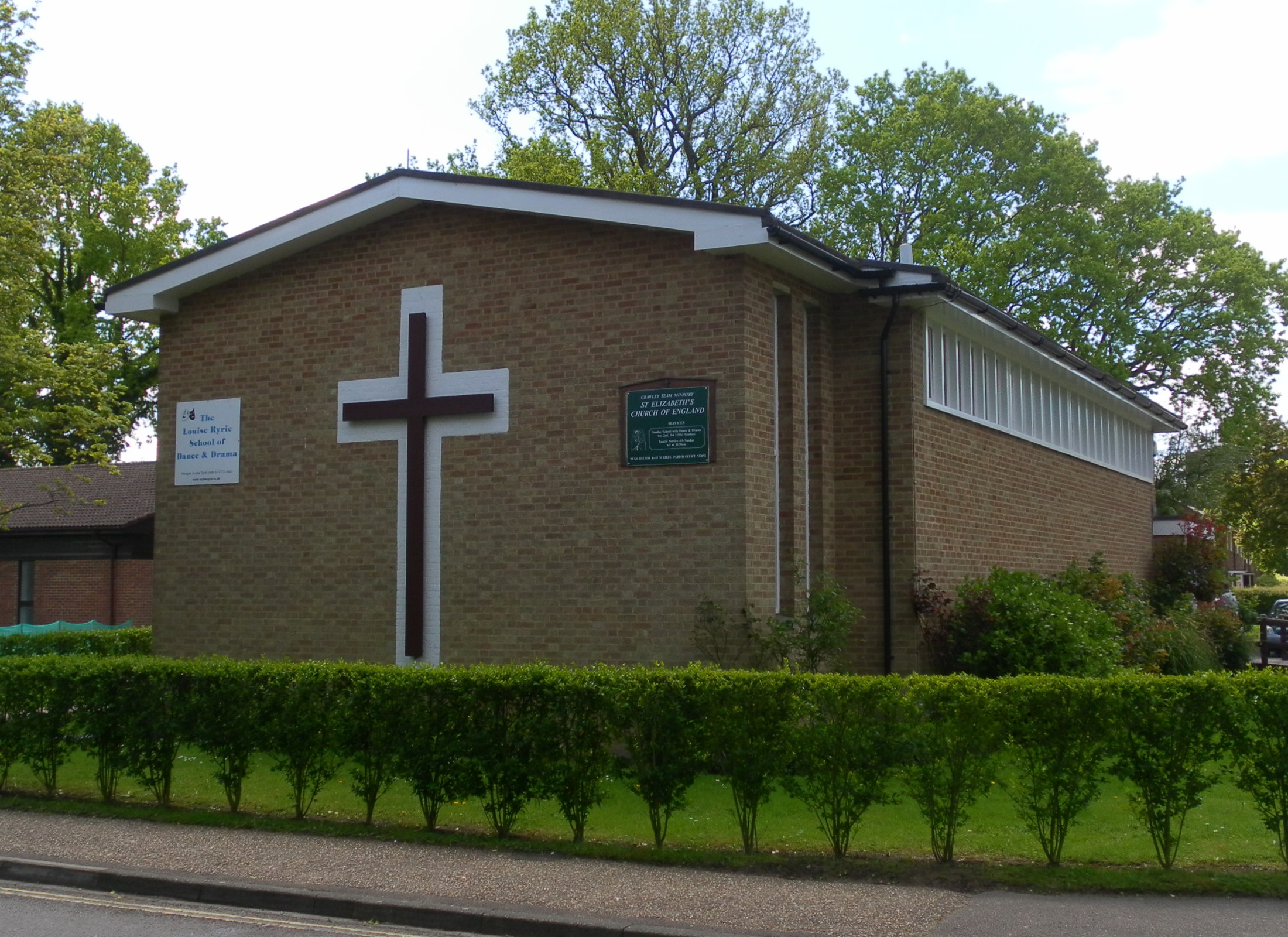
St Elizabeth's Church

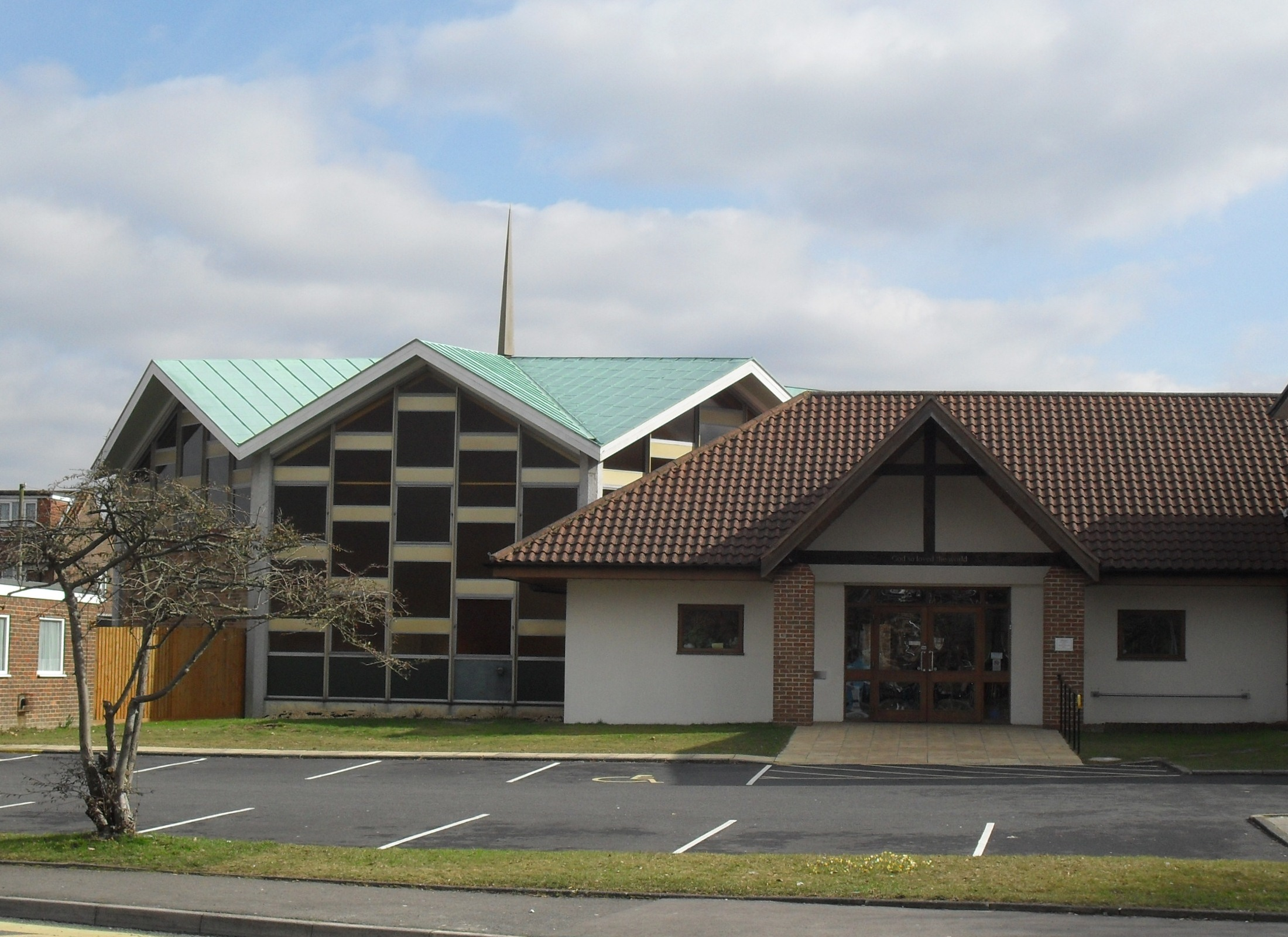
St Paul's Methodist Church

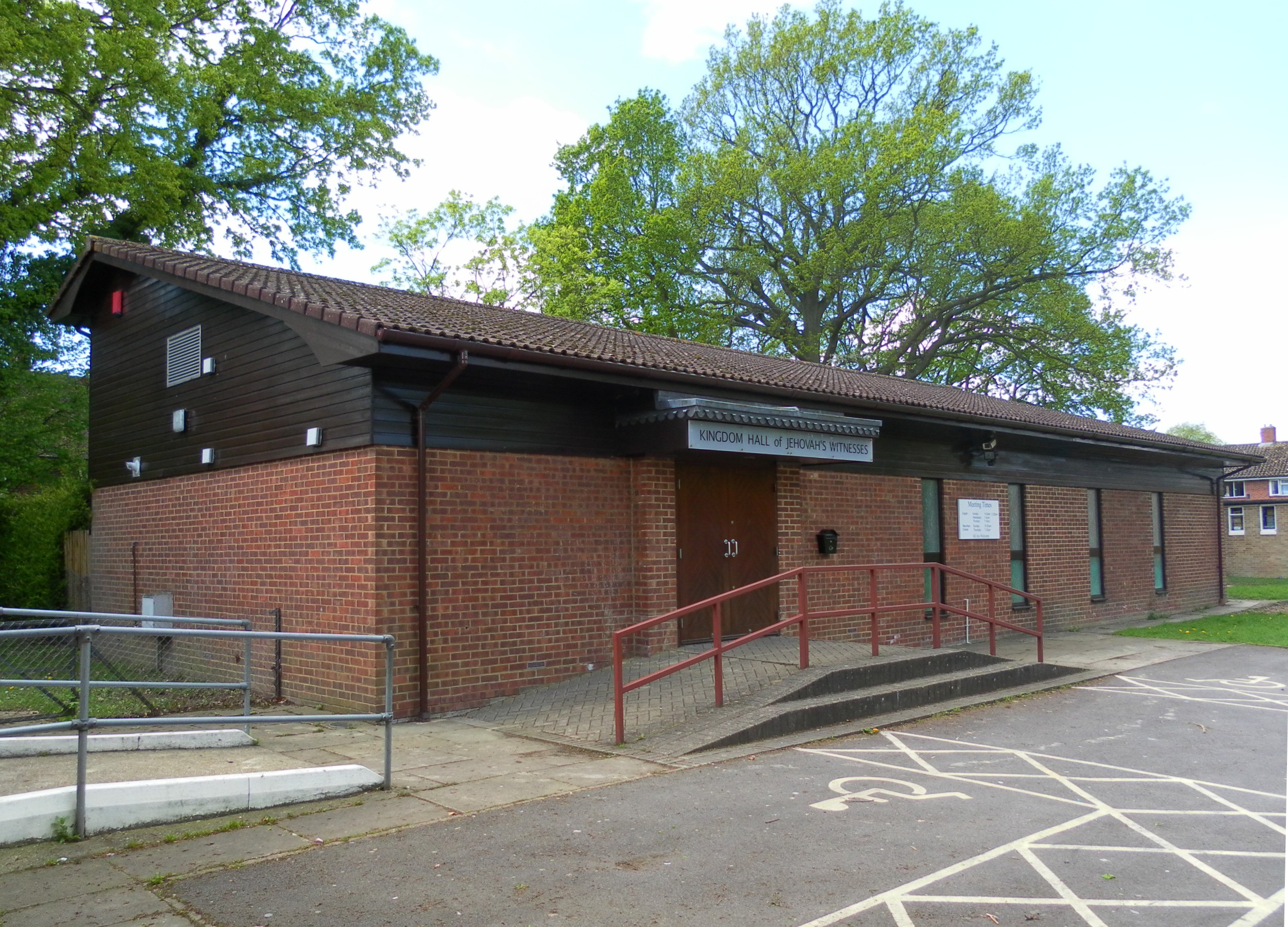
Kingdom Hall of Jehovah's Witnesses

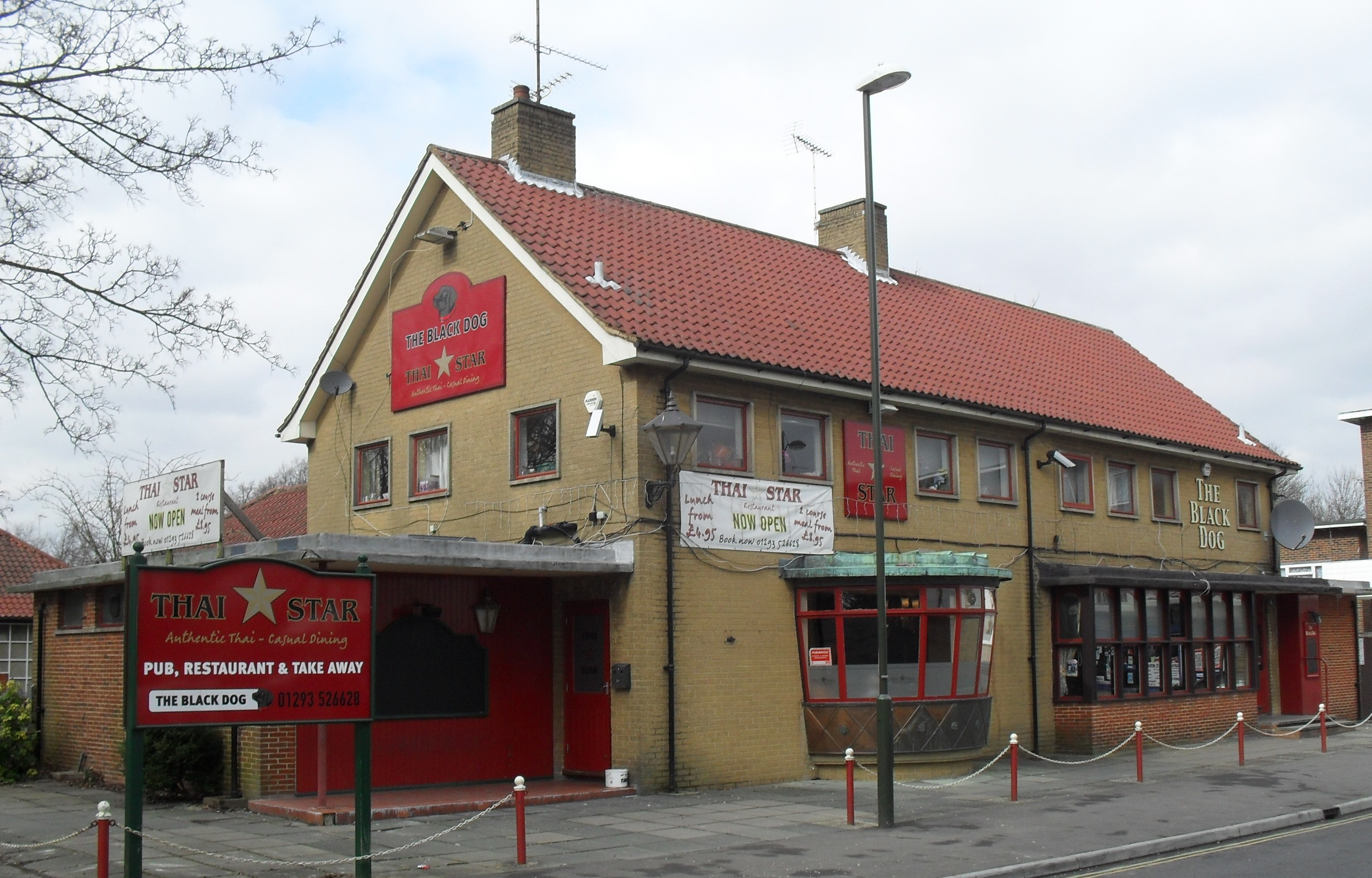
Black Dog pub

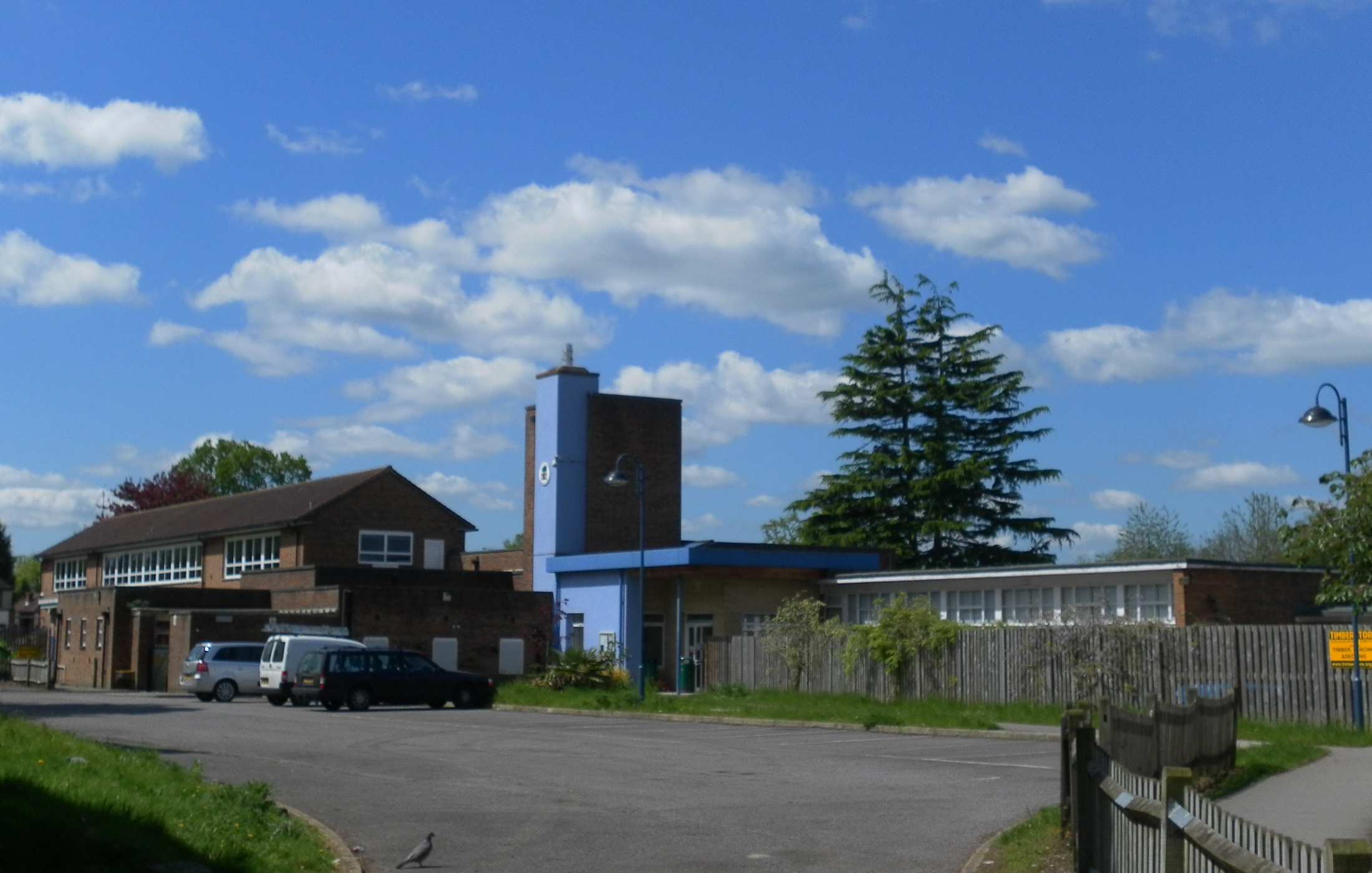
Northgate Primary School

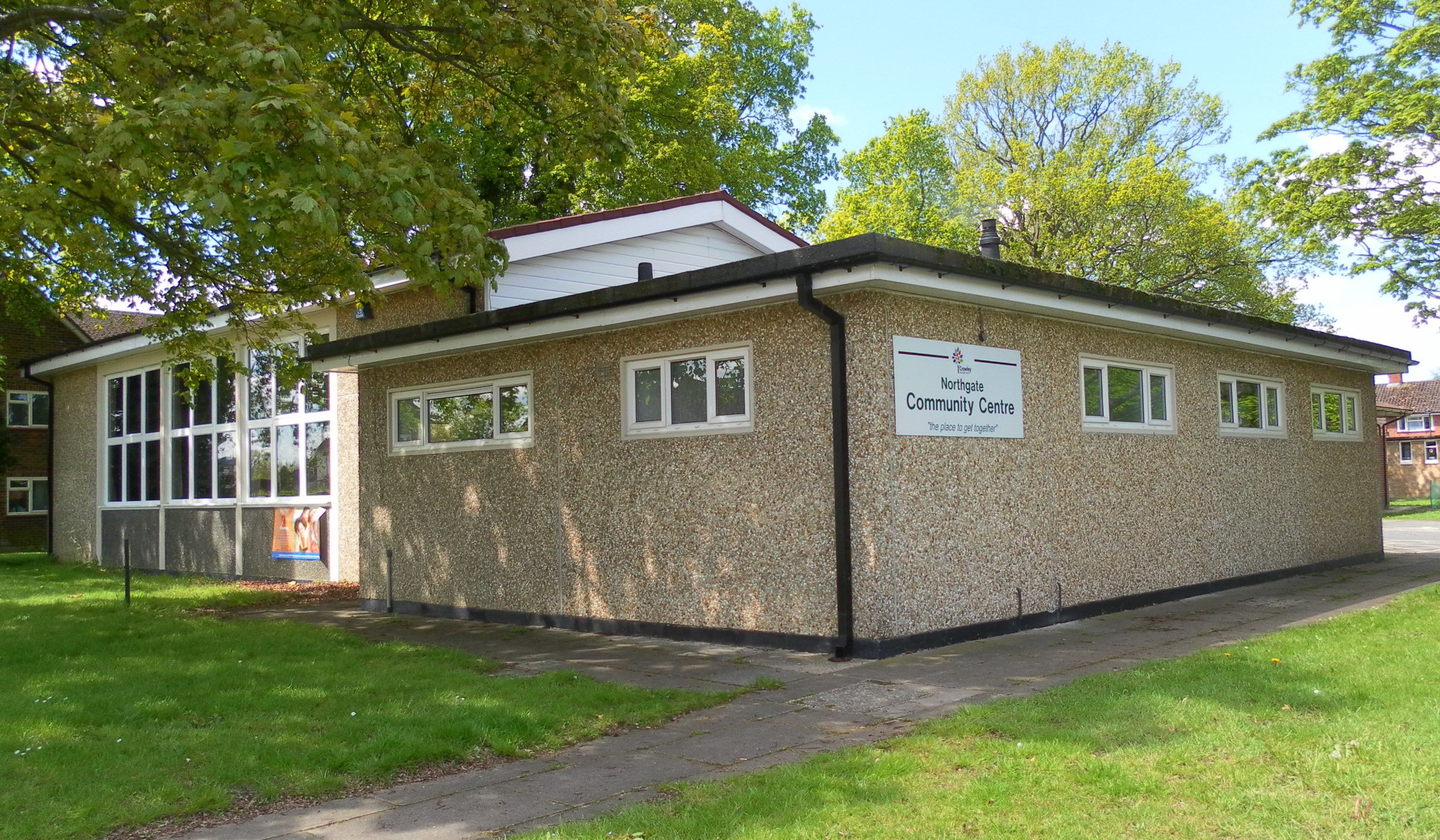
Northgate Community Centre

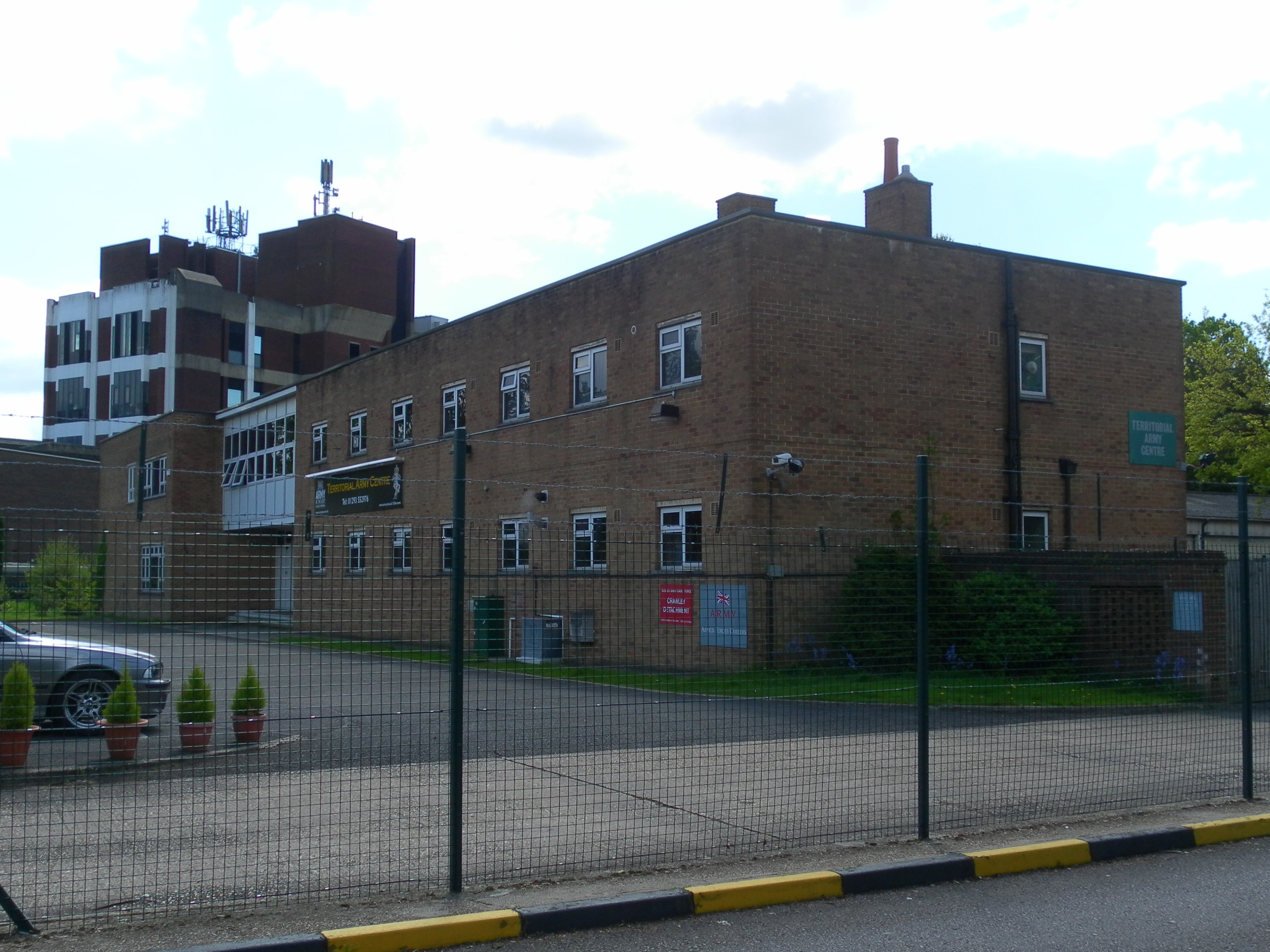
Territorial Army Centre

== Heritage ==
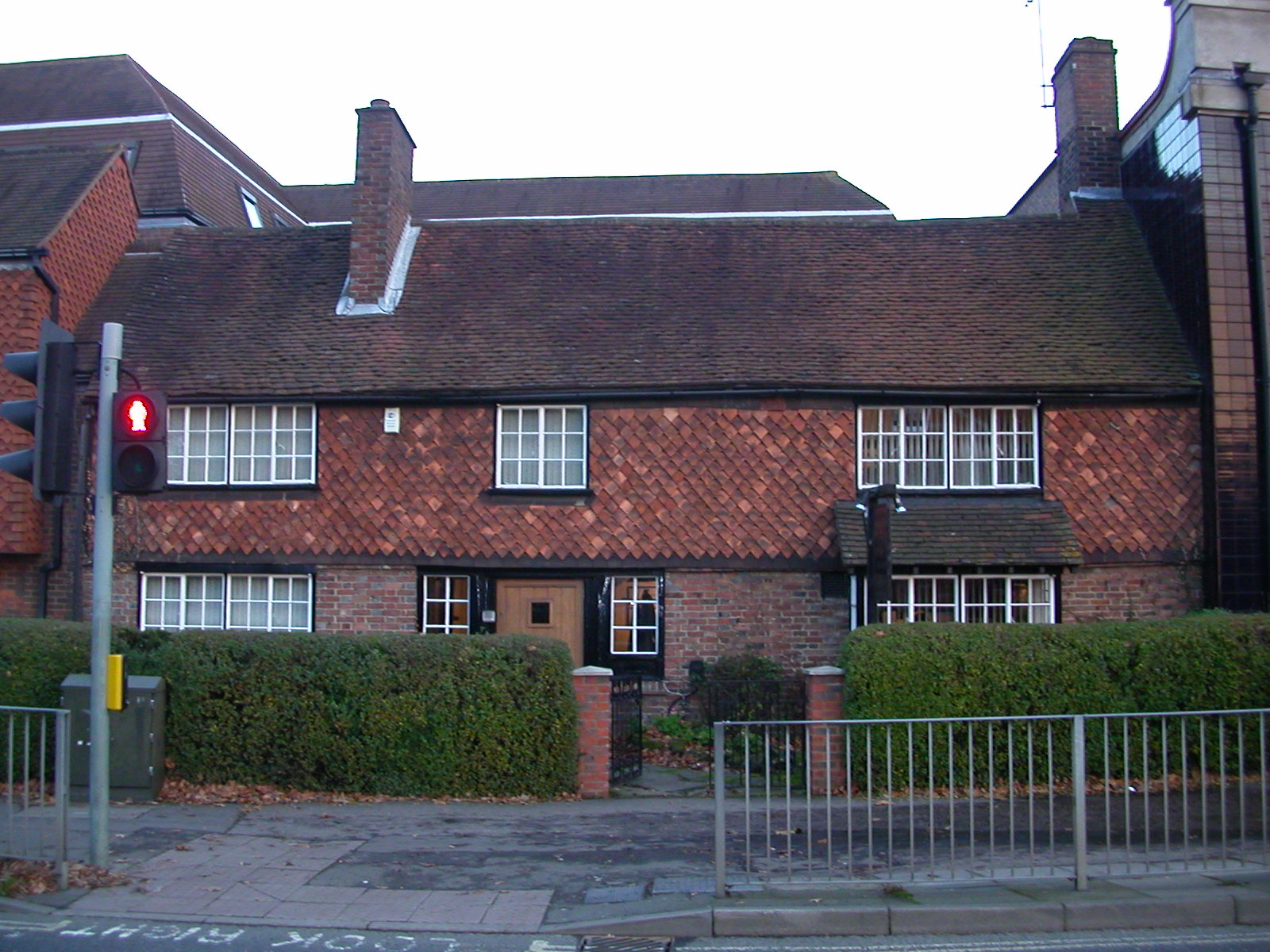
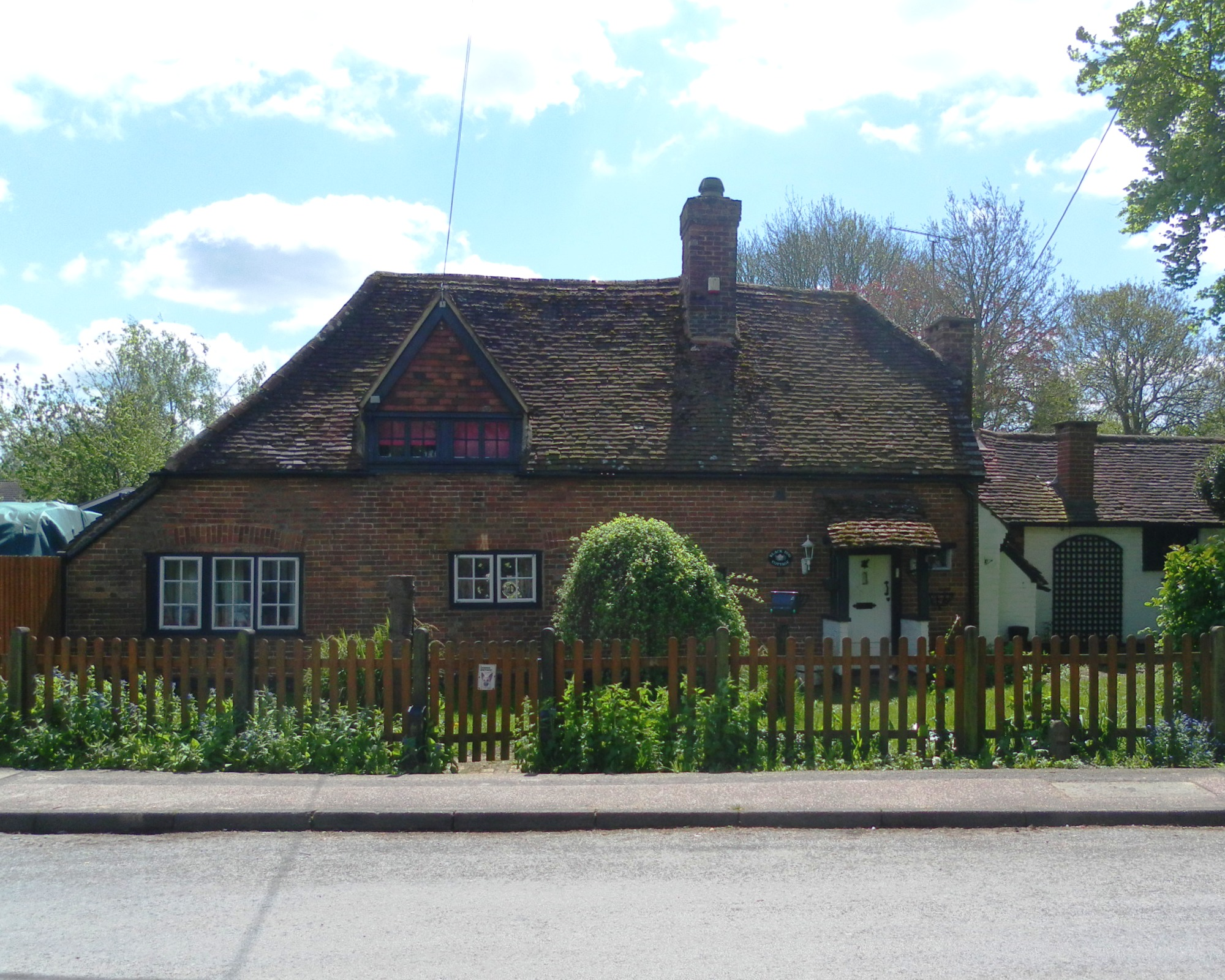
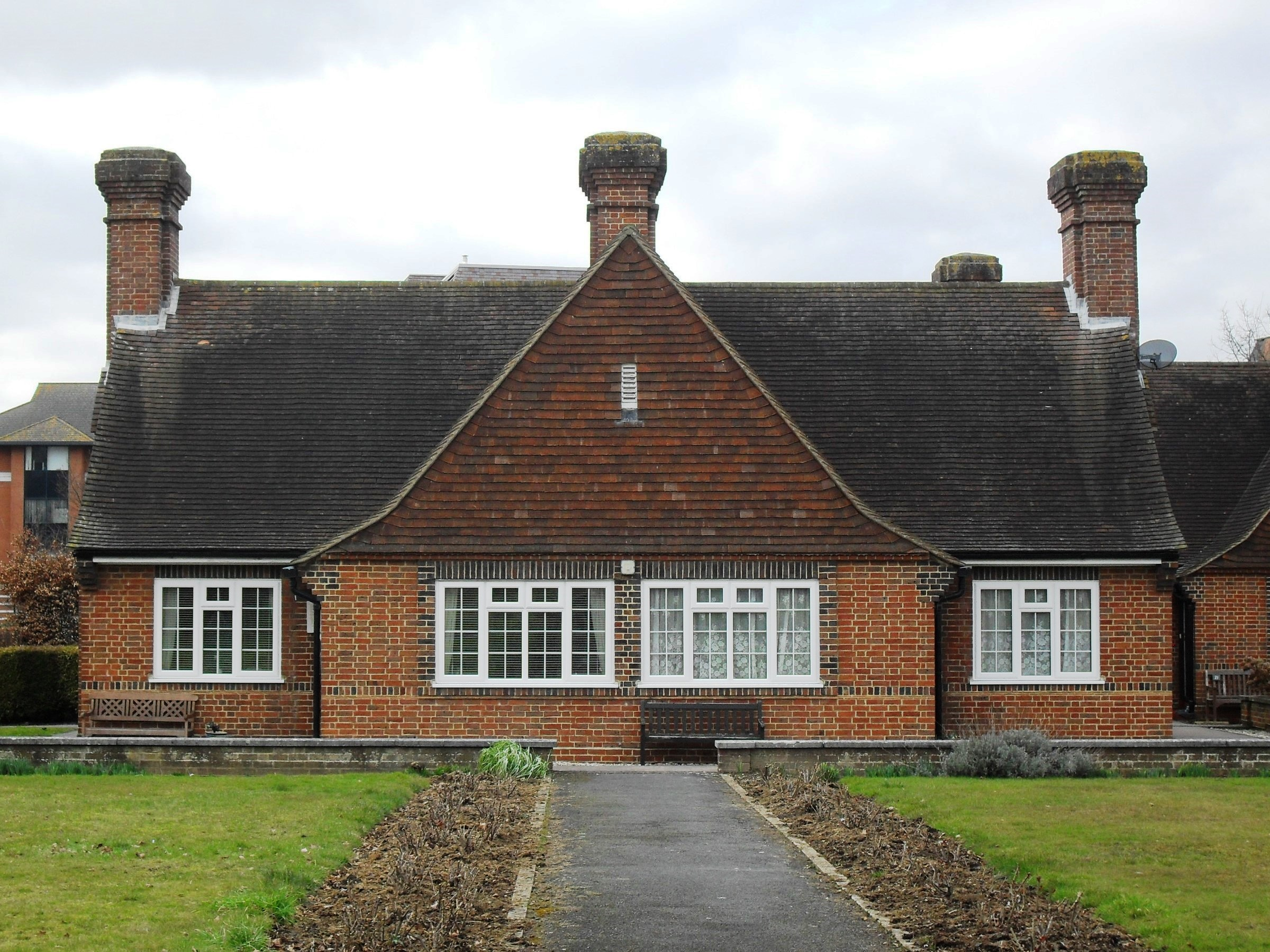
Left to right: Boscobel House, Black Dog Cottage and one of the Dyers Almshouses

Three of the 100 listed buildings and structures in the borough of Crawley are in Northgate. (Note: This excludes the town centre, part of which is described in Crawley Borough Council's heritage and conservation documents as lying in Northgate.) Boscobel House is at the south end of London Road close to where it becomes Crawley High Street, very close to the former Northgate tollgate. The building, which is now an office, was built as a two-storey timber-framed cottage in the late 17th century and was given a brick and tile façade a century later. The roof is also tiled. Black Dog Cottage is a 16th-century farmhouse which retains its original timber framing, although it was given a brick façade in the 19th century. Another original feature is the chimney, which sits on the steep tiled hipped roof. The rear elevation is weatherboarded. Fir Tree Cottage is another timber-framed building, although it is later: it was built in the late 17th or early 18th century. By 1792 it was in use as the Crawley parish workhouse. A mixture of brickwork, tiles, stucco and exposed timberwork can be seen on the exterior of the building, which (like Black Dog Cottage) is now a private house. It is on the east side of London Road.

There were 59 locally listed buildings in Crawley as of 2010, including one in Northgate. Dyers Almshouses are a "charming" complex of single-storey almshouses designed in the Arts and Crafts style by architect W.H. Hatchard-Smith of the Bertram & Co. firm in 1939–40. Their prominent tiled gables are "reminiscent of rural Dutch cottages", and each is topped with a large chimney. Only ten of the houses, which are set in a quadrangle around a garden, are original; another 16 were built to the same design in 1952, and four more were added in 1971. They were among the many buildings built in Crawley and the surrounding area by local building firm James Longley and Co. The buildings are also part of the Dyers Almshouses Conservation Area, one of 11 conservation areas in the borough.

== Transport ==
Metrobus route 100, part of the Crawley Fastway network, runs through Northgate along Woodfield Road, calling at several stops in the neighbourhood. The route serves Maidenbower, Three Bridges, Crawley town centre, the Manor Royal industrial estate and business district, Lowfield Heath, Gatwick Airport and the Surrey towns of Horley and Redhill. Several stops along London Road, the western boundary of the neighbourhood, are served by routes 4 and 5 (Gatwick Airport–Lowfield Heath–Langley Green–Crawley town centre–Three Bridges–Pound Hill) and 10 (Gatwick Airport–Manor Royal–Crawley town centre–Southgate–Broadfield–Bewbush).

== Bibliography ==
- Bastable, Roger (1983). Crawley: A Pictorial History. Chichester: Phillimore & Co. ISBN 0-85033-503-5.
- Bastable, Roger (1986). Crawley: The Making of a New Town. Chichester: Phillimore & Co. ISBN 0-85033-613-9.
- Cole, Belinda (2004). Crawley: A History & Celebration. Salisbury: Frith Book Company. ISBN 1-904938-19-1.
- Crawley Borough Council (November 2010). Crawley Local Building List (PDF) (Report). Crawley Borough Council. Archived from the original on 29 August 2012.
- Goepel, J. (1980). Development of Crawley. Crawley: Crawley Borough Council.
- Green, Jeffrey; Allen, Peter (1993). Crawley New Town in Old photographs. Stroud: Alan Sutton Publishing. ISBN 0-7509-0472-0.
- Gwynne, Peter (1990). A History of Crawley (1st ed.). Chichester: Phillimore & Co. ISBN 0-85033-718-6.
- Harris, Roland B. (December 2008). Crawley Historic Character Assessment Report. Sussex Extensive Urban Survey (EUS) (Report). English Heritage in association with Crawley Borough Council. Archived from the original (PDF) on 9 October 2012.
- Minoprio, Anthony (1949). A Master Plan for Crawley New Town (Report). London: Her Majesty's Stationery Office.
- Williamson, Elizabeth; Hudson, Tim; Musson, Jeremy; Nairn, Ian (2019). Sussex: West. The Buildings of England. New Haven and London: Yale University Press. ISBN 978-0-300-22521-1.
