= Worshipful Company of Dyers =

Livery company of the City of London

Coordinates: 51.51096°N 0.09121°W

Dyers' Company
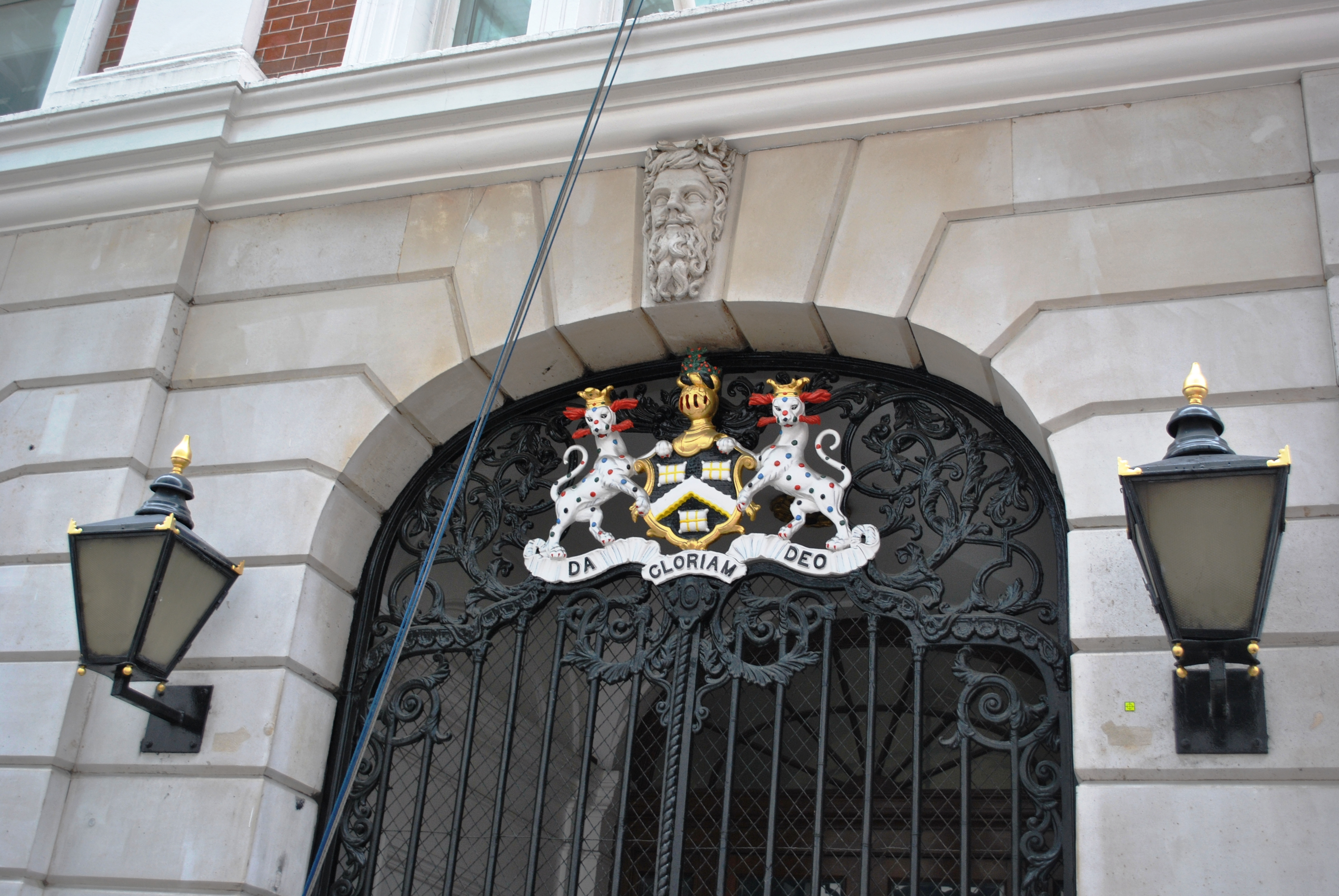
- The current hall, designed by Charles Dyer in 1839–40, at 10–13 Dowgate Hill
- Motto: Da Gloriam Deo; Latin for Give Glory to God
- Location: Dyers' Hall, Dowgate Hill, City of London
- Date of formation: 12th-century guild 1471 royal charter
- Company association: Dyeing
- Order of precedence: 13th
- Website: www.dyerscompany.co.uk

The Worshipful Company of Dyers is one of the Livery Companies of the City of London. The Dyers' Guild existed in the twelfth century; it received a Royal Charter in 1471. It originated as a trade association for members of the dyeing industry but is now mainly a charitable institution. Each year the company participates in the ceremony of Swan Upping along the River Thames.

The Dyers' Company ranks thirteenth in the order of precedence of Livery Companies. The company's motto is Da Gloriam Deo, Latin for "Give Glory to God".

== Current activities ==
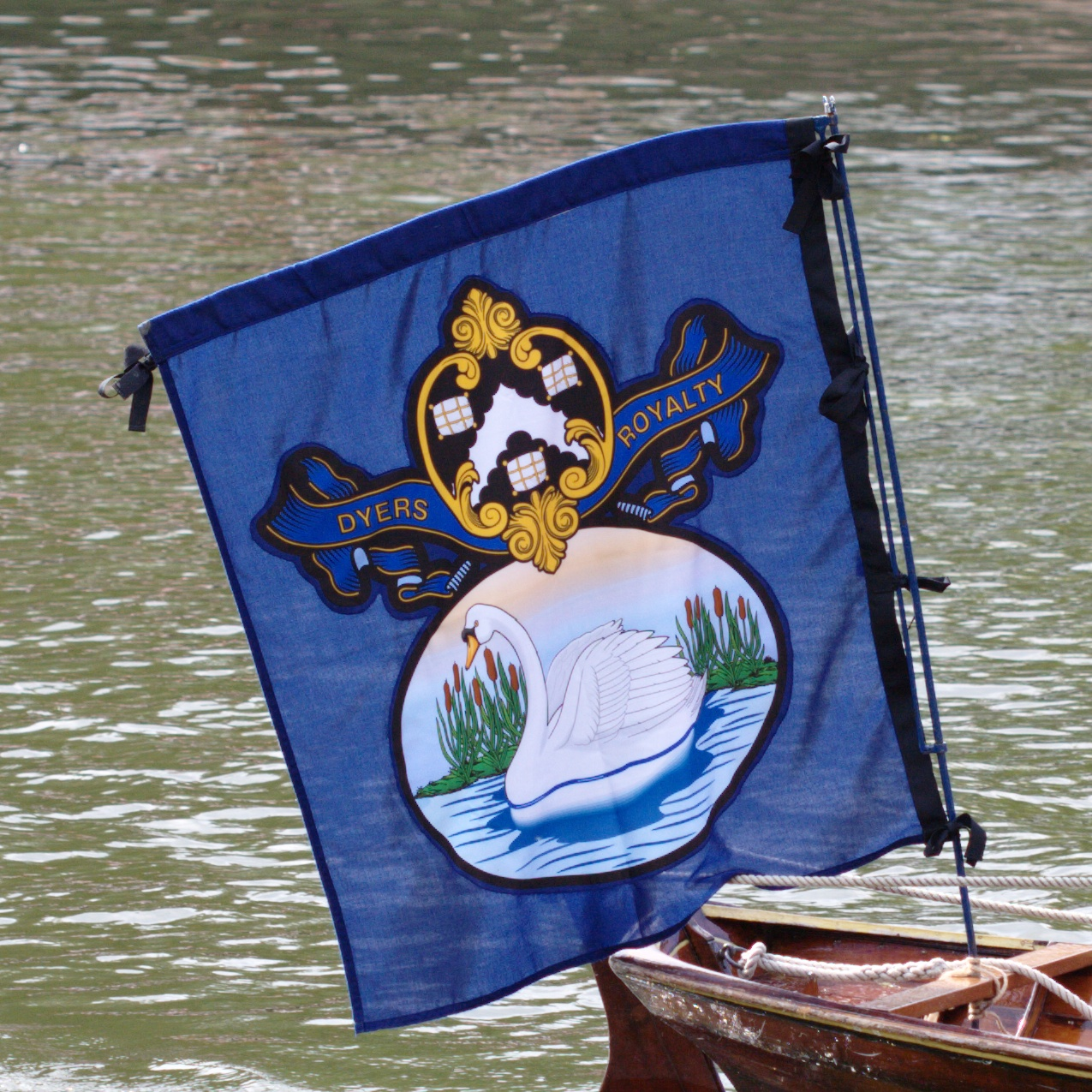
Dyers' Company flag during Swan Upping

The activities of the company are focused on the development of dyeing techniques and the support of various charitable causes. The Dyers' are associated with several organisations, including the Society of Dyers and Colourists, the University of Leeds and Heriot Watt University. The company also maintains the Dyers Almshouses, a group of 28 almshouses built between 1939 and 1971, in the Northgate area of Crawley, West Sussex. In education, the company is associated with several schools including Boutcher School, Norwich School and St Saviour's and St Olave's Church of England School.

== Dyers' Hall ==
The hall of the Dyers was originally located west of London Bridge, but was destroyed in the Great Fire of 1666. The current hall, designed by Charles Dyer and constructed in 1839–40, is at 10–13 Dowgate Hill in the City of London.

== Coat of arms ==
The blazon for the coat of arms is: Sable, a chevron engrailed argent, between three bags of madder of the last, corded or. Crest, on a wreath of the colours, three sprigs of a graintree erect vert, fructed gules. Supporters, two panthers incensed rampant guardant argent, spotted various colours, fire issuing from their ears and mouths proper, both ducally crowned or.

== Gallery ==
Worshipful Company of Dyers: Da Gloriam Deo (Give Glory to God)

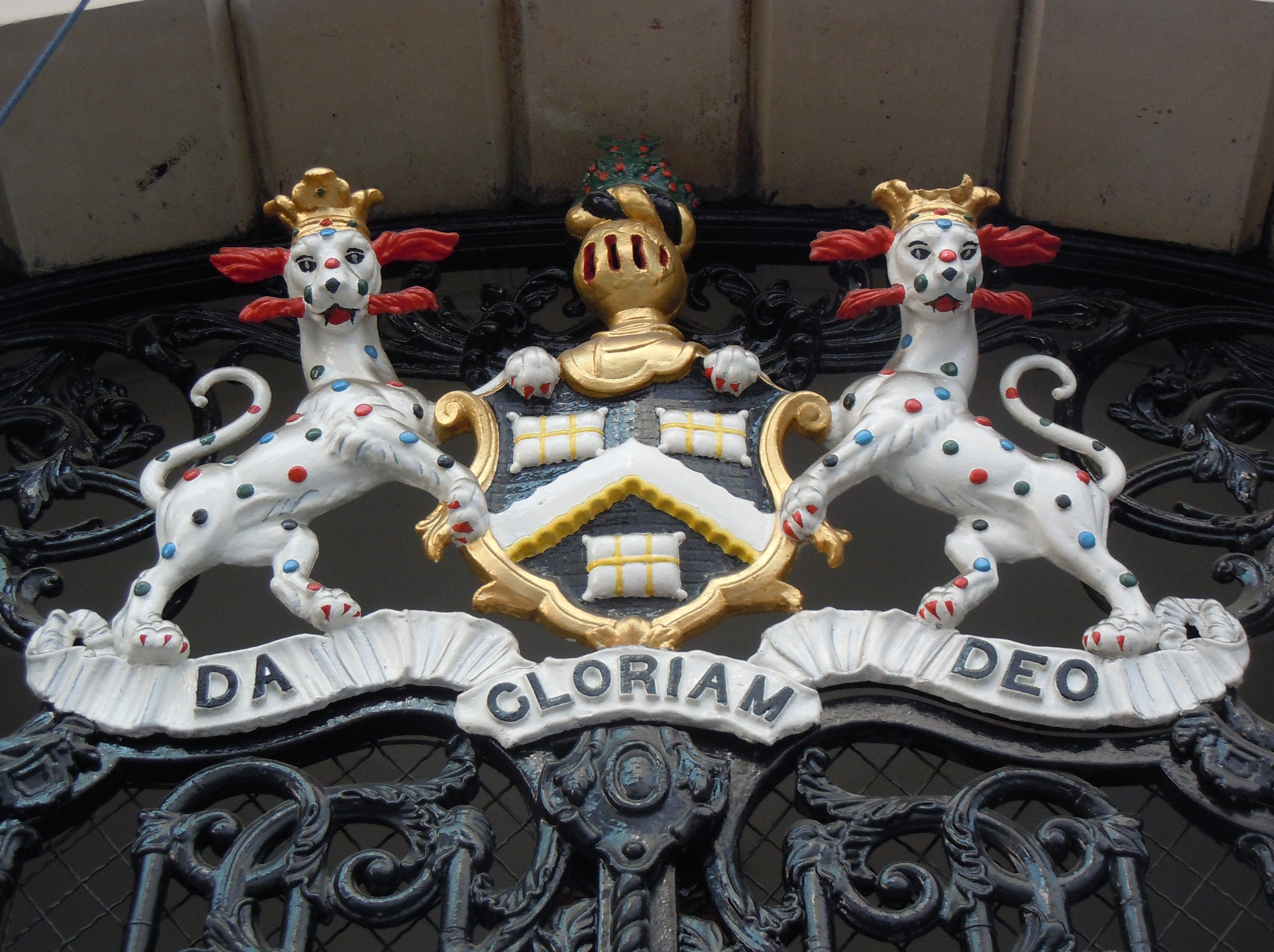
Worshipful Company of Dyers: Da Gloriam Deo (Give Glory to God)

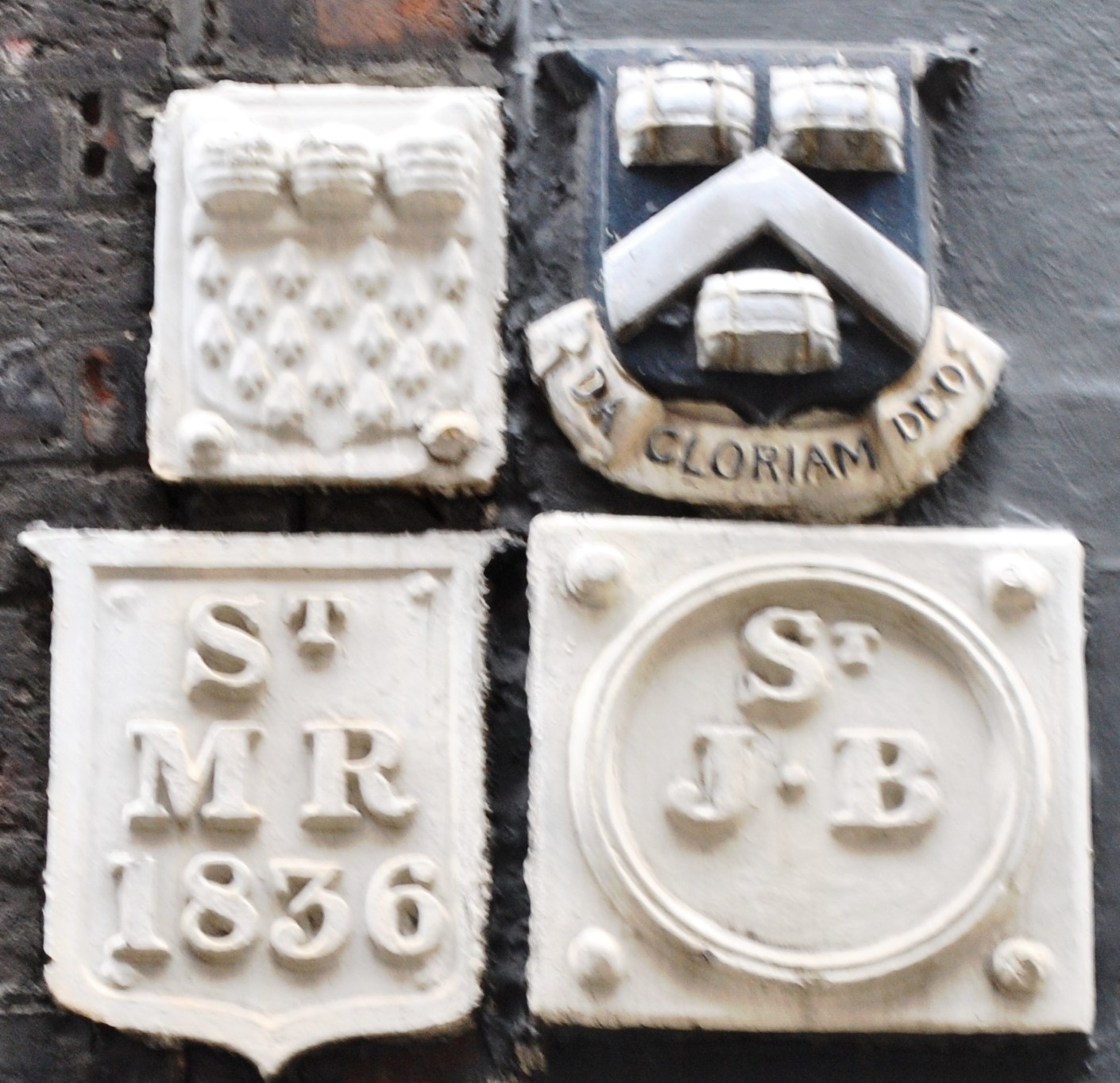
Worshipful Company of Dyers: Da Gloriam Deo (Give Glory to God)
