= Brewery Shades =

Brewery Shades Inn
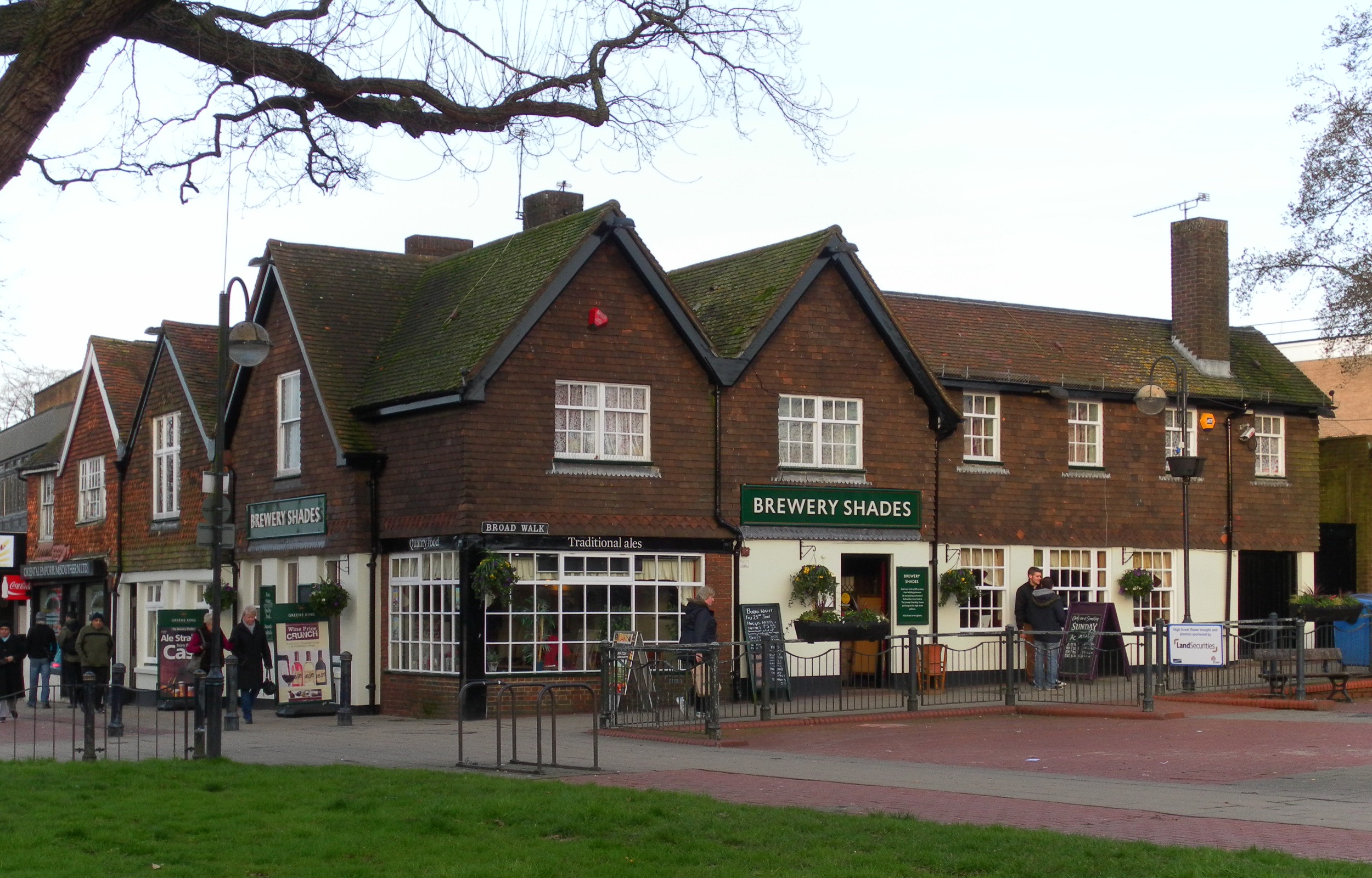
- The Pub from the southwest

- Location within Crawley
- 51.1156°N 0.1899°W
- Location: 85–87 High Street, Crawley, West Sussex RH10 1BA, England

History
- Built: 15th century

Site notes
- Architectural style: Timber-framed open hall-house

Listed Building – Grade II
- Official name: No 85 (Brewery Shades Inn)
- Designated: 21 June 1948
- Reference no.: 1279715

The Brewery Shades Inn is a public house on the High Street in Crawley, a town and borough in West Sussex, England. The building, which stands on a corner site at the point where the town's ancient High Street meets the commercial developments of the postwar New Town, has been altered and extended several times; but at its centre is a 15th-century timber-framed open hall-house of a type common in the Crawley area in the Middle Ages. Few now survive, and the Brewery Shades has been protected as a Grade II listed building.

== History ==
Crawley was granted a charter for a weekly market in 1202. Thereafter, what had been a village, on the London–Brighton road halfway between the two places, slowly grew into a market town and a centre for agriculture and ironworking. As the area became more prosperous, several timber-framed open hall-houses were built on both sides of the High Street (the name given to the part of the London–Brighton Road running through the town centre). These "Wealden hall-houses"—the design of which allowed smoke from open fires to rise through the hall and disperse readily—were common in the Weald of Kent and Sussex, and five have been documented in Crawley. One such building was the Shades (perhaps its original name), which was built in the 15th century. Estimates of the date range from "1450 or a little earlier" to c. 1500.

After chimneys were invented, the open hall-house design fell out of favour, and many such buildings had chimneys and fireplaces inserted. This happened at the Brewery Shades in the 17th century. At the same time, another storey was added internally and the façade was given two gable ends. Further changes were made over the next two centuries, such that the external appearance of the building was completely changed. The ground floor was affected most by the alterations.

Crawley was designated a New Town in the 1940s, and a new shopping area was built east of the High Street. One of the first projects was the creation of a pedestrian precinct, Broadwalk, between the main square (Queen's Square) and the High Street immediately south of the Brewery Shades. This opened in 1954, and the inn now occupied a prominent corner position. Buildings demolished to make way for this pedestrian link included Crawley's former post office and a blacksmith's forge.

The inn had subterranean passages leading to the George Hotel opposite, and cells where prisoners would be kept before being hanged at the gallows which stood outside the George for several centuries. The cells and passageways were not built at the same time as the inn, but were added soon afterwards. Reputed hauntings are a common feature of Sussex inns, and a wide variety of alleged paranormal activities at the Brewery Shades have been documented: a woman and child (a boy) associated in particular with one room in which a bed was once found alight for no reason; a doorbell ringing by itself during the night; and a man haunting the ladies' toilet. Historically, the word "shade" meant "ghost"—a possible explanation for the inn's name.

The Brewery Shades was designated a Grade II Listed building on 21 June 1948.

== Architecture ==
Although the medieval origins are now obscured behind a modern façade, substantial parts of the timber-framed original open hall-house layout remain inside. The oldest part of the building is the north–south range, parallel to the High Street. This has a gigantic tie-beam holding up a king post ceiling. The king post's structure includes purlins, chamfers and decorative mouldings. This façade has three modern gable ends and a tiled upper storey. Around the corner, facing Broadwalk, there is a twin-gabled modern façade, again with a tile-hung first floor and a stucco-faced ground floor. This part is a modern extension. At the northern end, there is another original wing running west to east: it has substantial timberwork with chamfering, visible from one of the bars.
