= English vernacular architecture =

Local architectural styles in England

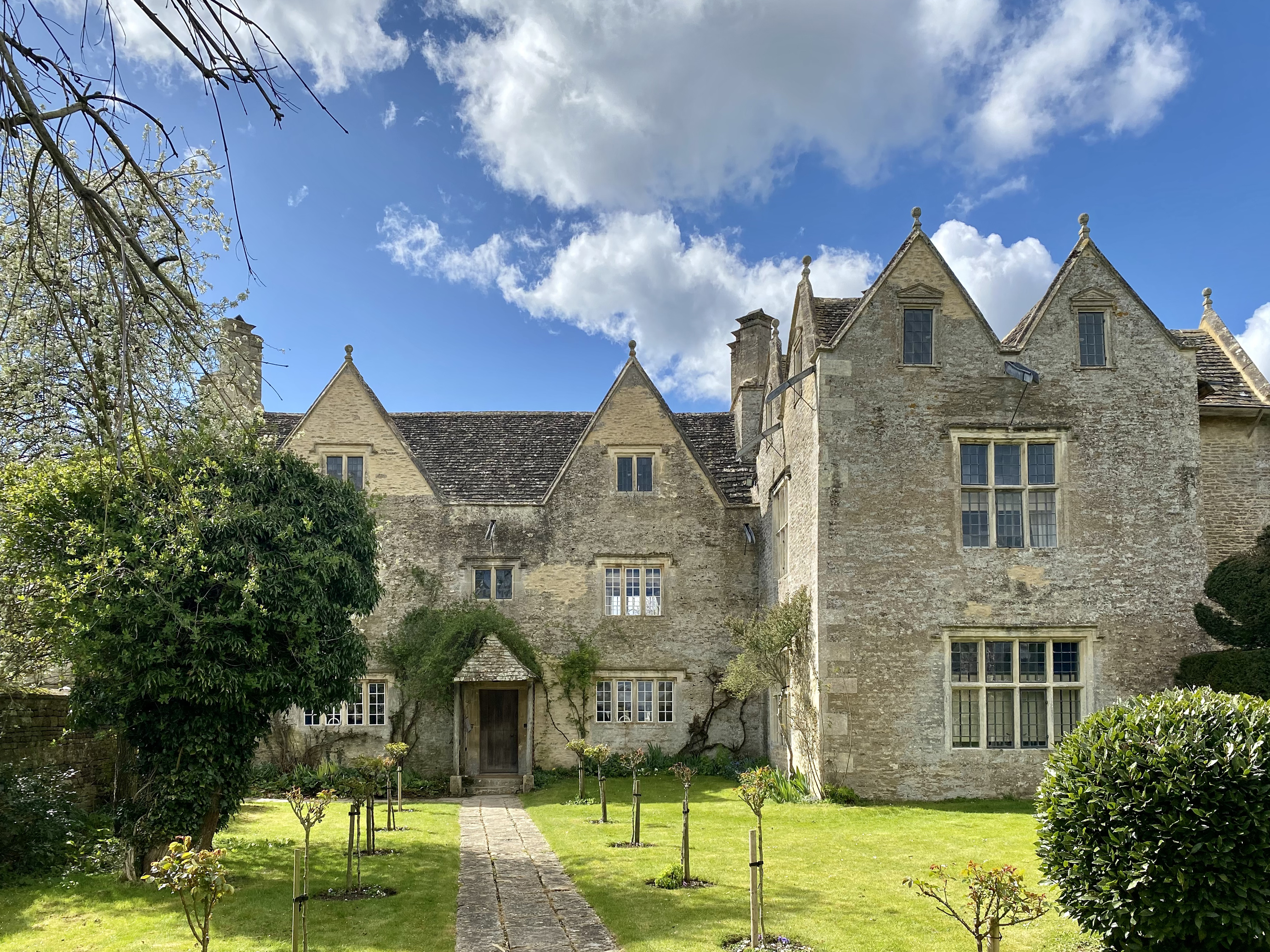
Kelmscott Manor, an example of Cotswolds vernacular architecture

English vernacular architecture is the vernacular architecture built in England, especially between the Middle Ages and the Industrial Revolution. Vernacular architecture is that designed and built by people without formal academic training, following local precedents and using locally available materials. This includes manor houses, farmhouses, cottages, agricultural buildings, mills, some industrial buildings and chapels, but generally excludes castles, palaces, factories and churches. Due to the great geological and economic variation within England, vernacular buildings in different regions of the country appear very different.

== History ==
While earlier examples exist, English vernacular houses begin to survive in large numbers after the Great Rebuilding. This hypothesised event was when farmers began to construct their houses in materials durable enough to survive to the present, due to increased wealth and security. It is believed to have begun in the prosperous south-east in the 16th century, and to have lasted in the poorer north-west into the 18th century. The ephemeral buildings before this time have been referred to as 'primitive architecture', though the developed nature of the plans of surviving vernacular buildings suggests that the Great Rebuilding reflected changes in building materials, not form. The boundary between 'primitive architecture' and surviving vernacular architecture is the 'vernacular threshold', while the boundary between vernacular and 'polite' (professionally-designed) architecture is the 'polite threshold'. Both these thresholds are blurred, as archaeology has show that some medieval peasants' houses were solidly built, while polite architecture could still exhibit local variation, due to fashion or available materials. Both thresholds also varied by social class, such that most houses of the nobility were polite by the 16th century, and farmhouses by the 19th century, whereas in some regions labourers' cottages seldom survive before the 19th century. In addition, houses were generally built in a permanent form before agricultural or industrial buildings, giving them an earlier vernacular threshold.

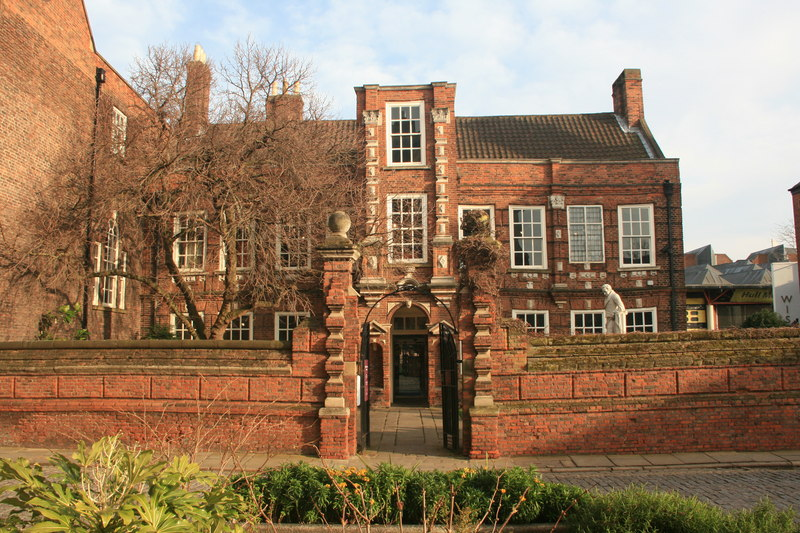
Wilberforce House, Hull, c.1656. An example of pattern-book architecture - while the individual details are Classical, their arrangement resembles no Roman building.

Early vernacular architecture was based on medieval Gothic architecture, i.e. ornamented features like doors and open roofs used pointed arches. Houses were generally based on a full-height hall, heated from an open hearth. The introduction of Renaissance architecture in the 16th century was largely ignored at the vernacular level, but there were important changes. The increased use of chimneys and fireplaces meant that the open hall could be ceiled over, creating a house of multiple floors and enclosed rooms. From the 17th century, printed architectural pattern books became widely available to craftsmen (who would both design and construct buildings), disseminating classical details. However, the proportional systems behind classical architecture were misunderstood by local builders, leading to the sub-medieval or Artisan Mannerist styles, which freely combined Gothic, Classical and wholly invented forms. In the 18th century, the growth of the professional architect and the publication of more competent pattern books led to middle-class Georgian houses looking increasingly similar, though still with the variety that came from using local materials. Following the Industrial Revolution, mass-production of materials and improved railway transportation meant that similar building materials were used across the country, particularly brick and Welsh slate, meaning that vernacular building generally ceased in the 19th century.

== Materials ==
=== Timber ===
In most parts of England, timber was historically abundant and was the most common structural material, though its susceptibility to decay means that it is now under-represented in surviving buildings. In the vernacular period, timber was used as a structural frame, rather than in logs walls like Scandinavia. Most regions used box framing, in which the roof structure sits atop the walls. The gaps between the timbers were then usually filled with wattle and daub, though other materials like brick could be used. In eastern England, the timbers were set close together so that these panels were long and thin, while in the west the panels were usually squarer. Western England also used cruck framing, in which paired timbers formed A-frames carrying a steep roof, with low, structurally independent side walls. Timber framed walls could be finished with a variety of treatments, including plain limewash, pargeting, tile-hanging (in a variety of patterns), slate-hanging, mathematical tiles (to simulate brick) and weatherboarding.

=== Masonry ===
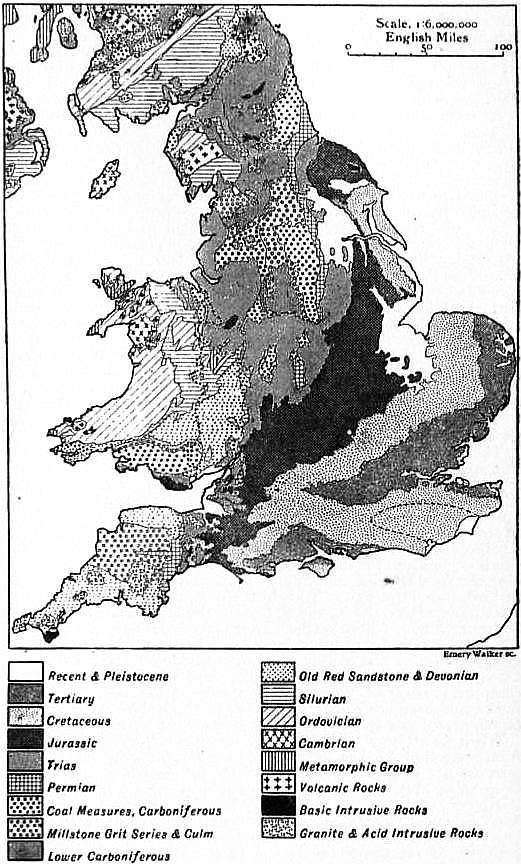
Map showing the underlying geology of England and Wales. The black band is the limestone belt, with generally older formations to its north-west and newer ones to its south-east.

For its size, England has a great variety of building stones. The country is diagonally divided by a belt of good limestone, running from Dorset to Yorkshire. To its north-west, there are sandstones in Devon, the West Midlands and Durham, and then hard volcanic granites and slates in Cornwall and Cumbria. To its south-east, there are soft chalks and unworkable flints, overlaid by clay. In vernacular buildings, stone was generally used as rubble, though many better-quality houses had ashlar walling, and the Cornish even cut granite into neat blocks, for example at Cotehele. Because south-east England lacks good building stones but has abundant clay, it was the first part of the country to make bricks, starting on a small scale in the 12th century (Coggeshall Abbey, Essex), but expanding after the 15th century. As well as superseding timber framing, brick began to displace stone, due to its ease in construction and use in high-status buildings like Hampton Court Palace.

=== Earth ===
As well as being used for various forms of daub and plaster, earth was used in some regions to make walls, including cob in the West Country, clay dabbins in north Cumbria, mud and stud (a crude variant of wattle and daub) in Lincolnshire and Lancashire, clay lump (adobe) in East Anglia, and wychert in Buckinghamshire. Except for cob, earth walling was generally used for lower-quality buildings, and has not survived well. As earth walls have less structural capacity than masonry, they were often combined with cruck roofs.

=== Roofing ===
Traditionally, reed or straw thatch was the main roof covering in England. However, its flammability and short lifespan led to other materials being sought. Where stones that could be split were available, these were used: genuine slates in Cumbria and the West Country, flagstones in the north-west, and various stone 'slates' (such as Horsham in Sussex and Collyweston in Northamptonshire) elsewhere. Where suitable stone was not available, clay tiles (south-east and central England) or pantiles (east and north-east England) were used. When a pantiled roof is steeply pitched and has flagstone courses at the eaves, it has often replaced a thatched covering. Timber shingles are now seldom seen, except on some church spires around Sussex.

== Regional variations ==
Ronald Brunskill divided English vernacular architecture into thirteen regions, each with their own distinct architecture, as follows:

=== South-East England ===
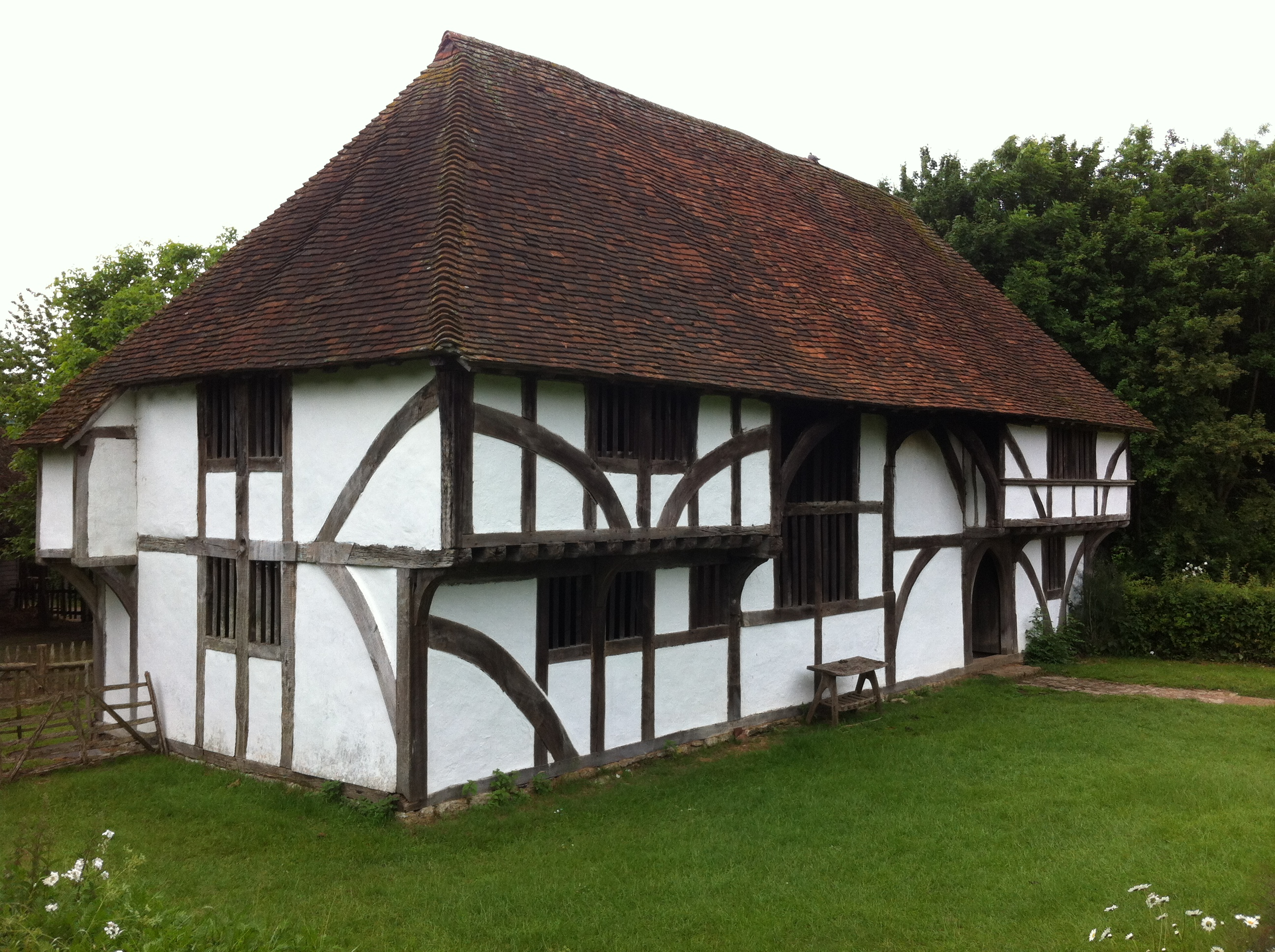
Bayleaf, a reconstructed Wealden house

The lack of good stone meant that brick generally followed timber framing (though also some flintwork). Chequered flint and chalk walling can be seen in some parts of Dorset and Wiltshire. Bungaroosh, a loose agglomeration of rubble and brick which has been described as "the worst building material in the world", was used around Brighton in the 18th and 19th centuries. The Wealden house was a common late medieval form, efficiently combining hall and side chambers under one hipped roof, often with gablets to allow the smoke to escape. Medieval buildings also often had decorative crown post roofs. Timber could be clad in various forms of tile hanging, though in Tenterden weatherboarding was used even on Classical-style buildings. The oast house was a common industrial building, used for drying local hops; many examples have now been converted to houses.

=== South-West England ===
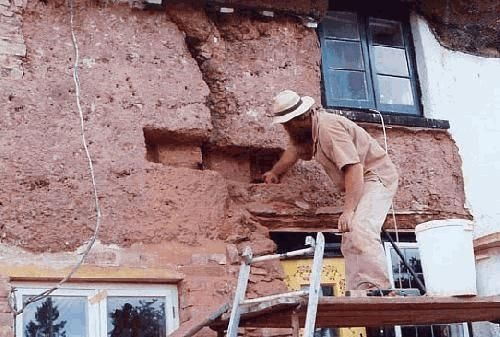
Cob walling in Halberton, Devon

In Devon, cob and rounded straw thatch were common. Roofs were often half-hipped, rather than gabled. Jointed crucks (where the curved blade is formed of two timbers, not one) were used in east Devon and west Dorset and Somerset. There could be distinctive bulbous projections from chimney-breasts, to house ovens. Houses with chimneys on the front wall were concentrated in north Devon. In Cornwall, some manor houses used massive, laboriously cut granite blocks, though sandstone was more common. Even stone walls were often covered with slate hanging, to protect against the Atlantic weather. Early farms were often longhouses, with people and animals under one roof. Chall barns (a form of bank barn) were occasionally used to combine crops and livestock. The ruined engine houses of former tin mines are a UNESCO-listed feature of the Cornish landscape.

=== East Anglia ===
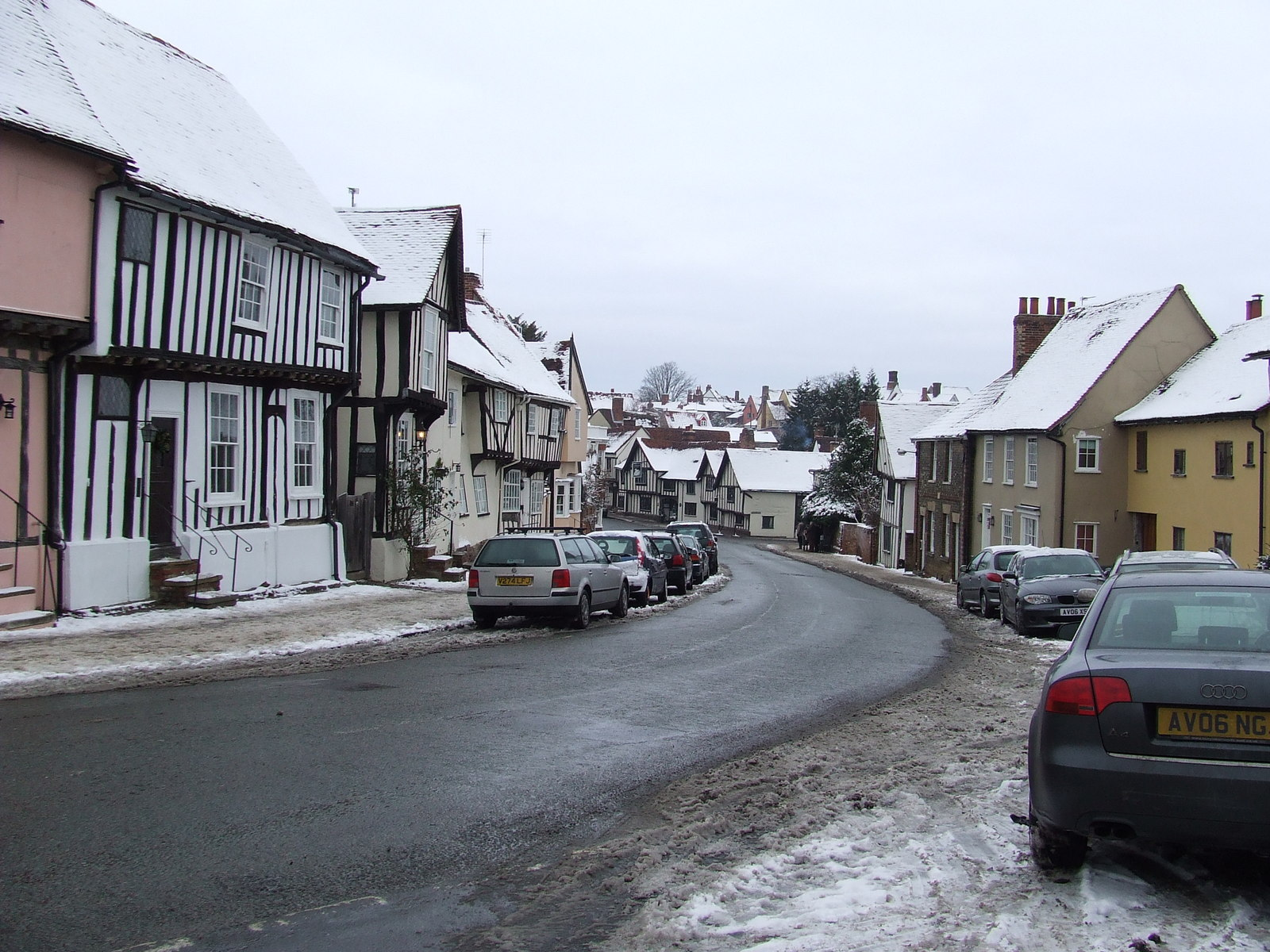
Close-studding in Lavenham, Suffolk

Churches and other high-status buildings were generally built of flint, due to the lack of better stone. This could be combined with expensively-imported freestone to form ornamental flushwork patterns. Most houses were timber framed with close studding, which could be used decoratively, as at Paycocke's House, Essex. Roofs were steep and gabled. Suffolk is distinctive for its 'Suffolk pink' limewash, coloured with berries or oxblood. Limewash could also be decorated with incised pargeting, or even moulded plasterwork, as at the Ancient House, Ipswich. Brick was used early, and could be used to dress flint walls or infill timber framing, as well as on its own. In the Fens, brick production combined with trading connections to the Low Countries and extensive use of pattern books to give rise to the 'Fen Artisan' style in the mid-17th century. The baffle-entry house plan, in which the front door leads to a lobby beside the central chimney, was common from the 16th century. Barns, of which Essex has some very large and early aisled examples, were weatherboarded and tarred. Thatching was steep, of Norfolk reed, a prized material.

The low-lying nature of the Norfolk Broads means that water must be pumped out to keep the land dry; this was traditionally done by windpumps (often erroneously termed windmills), of which the surviving examples are brick tower mills. Earlier 'true' windmills in the region could also be timber post or smock mills.

=== Home Counties ===
The Home Counties combined the features of the surrounding regions, with poor flinty or chalky stone often covered with limewash. Wychert, a mixture of chalk, clay and straw, was also used.

=== The Cotswolds and the Limestone Belt ===
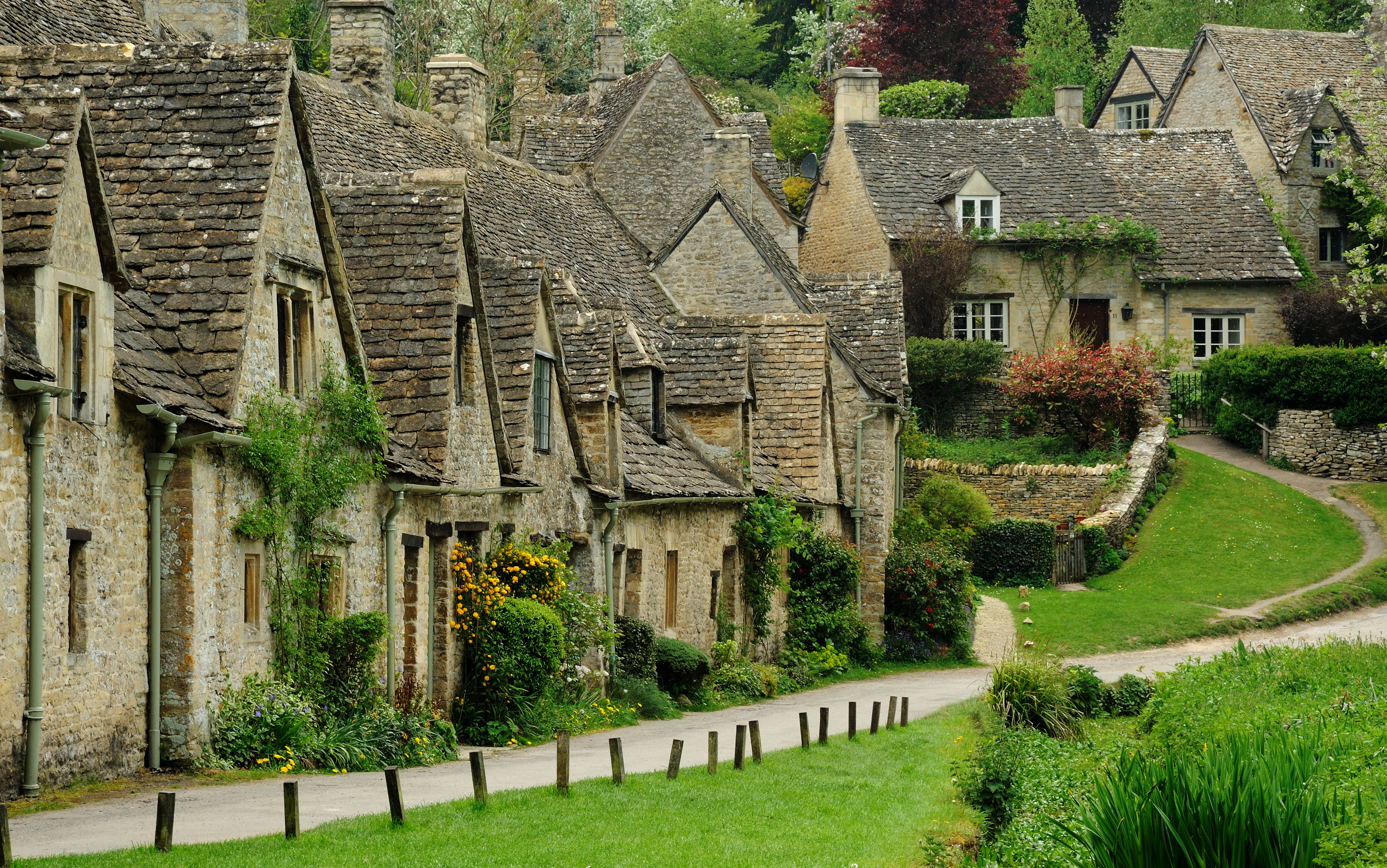
Arlington Row, Bibury, Glos.

This region has the best building stone in England, including the Portland, Purbeck, Ham, Bath, Cotswold, Barnack, Clipsham, Ketton, Ancaster and Tadcaster limestones. These vary in colour from the rich gold oolitic limestones of Bath to the near-white magnesian of Tadcaster. Much of the region has also been prosperous throughout its history, giving a consistent series of high-quality vernacular buildings, concentrated in towns like Stamford, Lincolnshire. The better farmhouses could even be built of ashlar, where a nearby quarry kept stone transport costs down. Roofs were generally of steeply-pitched stone 'slates', such as those mined at Collyweston. Windows were mullioned, often with hood moulds. Chimneys were square, and could come in pairs or groups.

=== West Midlands ===
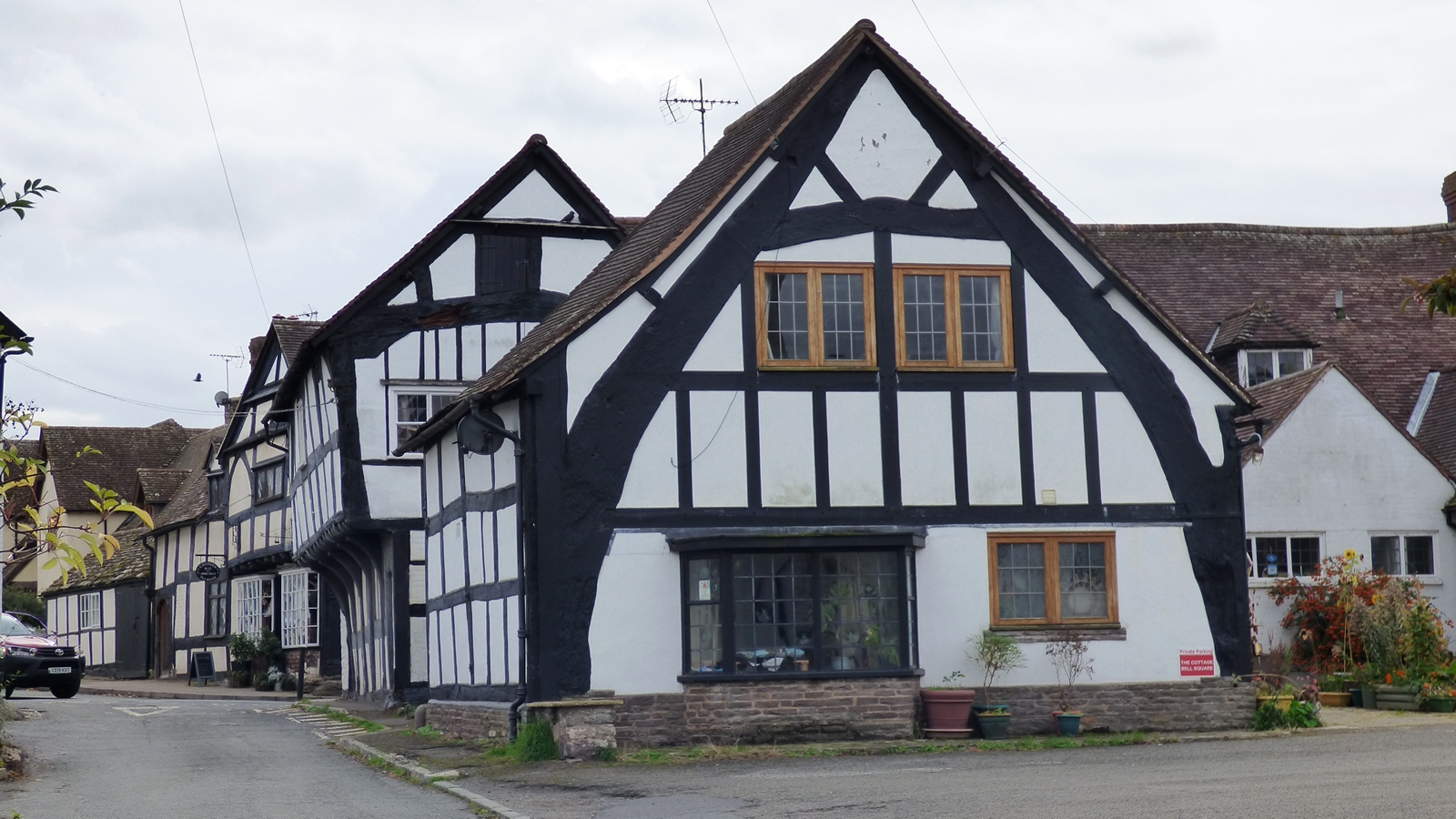
Square-panel and cruck-framed buildings in Weobley, Herefs.

Cruck and box frame construction sat side by side, with some very large timbers being used. Wattle and daub panels were usually wide and plain. Many cruck buildings have been heightened to allow two full storeys, with the former steeper roof being visible in the gable end. Forms of cruck roofs could even be used for fashionable, high-status buildings, such as Stokesay Castle.

=== East Midlands ===
Red brick and pantile dominated, especially after the 18th century, giving buildings a very uniform appearance. Brick gables could be 'tumbled in' to give a smooth edge. Mud and stud was sometimes used for very low-status buildings.

=== South Pennines ===
The widespread use of gritstone, now blackened with pollution, for walls and roofs, combined with austere square details round windows and doors, can make buildings look harsh and forbidding. Roofing slabs were often massive, meaning that they must be laid to a low pitch. Archaeological examination has revealed a series of late medieval timber framed hall houses, embedded in later buildings.

=== North-West England ===
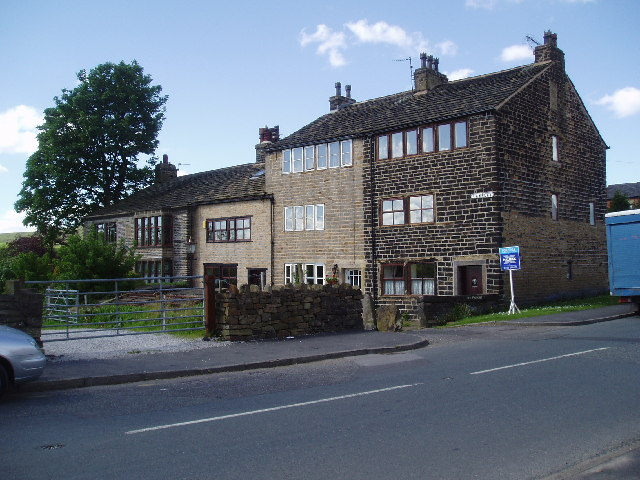
Weavers' cottages in Lawflat, Wardle, Lancs.

In Cheshire and south Lancashire, the panels of timber framing were ornamented with cusping and curved or diagonal bracing, as at Chorley Hall, Little Moreton Hall and Speke Hall. In stone areas, front door lintels were often emblazoned with the date and owners' initials. Roofs were of low-pitched flags, as in the Pennines.

In the early phases of the Industrial Revolution, some cottage industries grew for a time, as only some processes were mechanised. For example, spinning was mechanised before weaving, leading to an explosion of weavers' cottages in the early 19th century, with loomshops on the top floor lit by large mullioned windows.

=== Cumbria ===
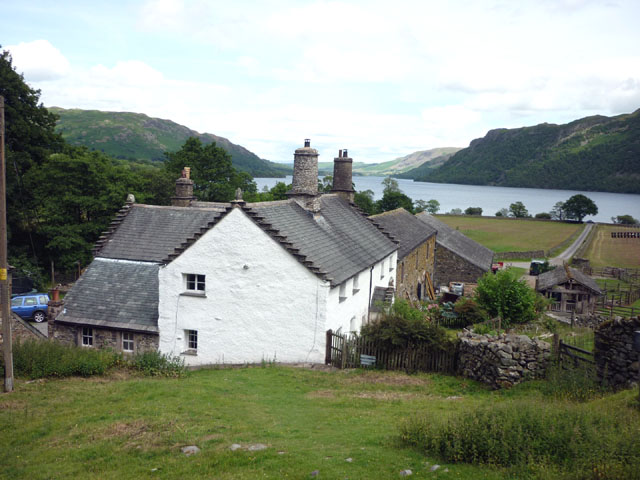
Glencoyne Farm, Cumbria, with Westmorland chimneys

Due to its volcanic geology and geographic isolation, the vernacular architecture of Cumbria is distinct from that of the rest of North-West England. During the medieval Wars of Scottish Independence, pele towers and bastle houses were built to defend against Scottish reivers, while in most parts of England people were settling down in unfortified manor houses. The Great Rebuilding lasted from the mid-17th to mid-18th centuries, when statesman farmers took advantage of their secure tenures (legally confirmed in 1625 and better than those of farmers elsewhere in the country) to build solidly. Houses are generally built of whitewashed stone and roofed in greenish Westmorland slate. The typical 17th century plan was two rooms wide by one deep, with the farm buildings in line but separated by a cross passage (hallan). The main living room (firehouse) had an inglenook backing onto the passage, lit by a small 'fire window'. The main entrance to the house was off the cross passage, through a lobby (mell), separated from the inglenook by a timber partition (heck). In the 18th century, houses moved to a double pile plan, i.e. two rooms deep.

A distinctive feature was the tapered cylindrical Westmorland chimney. In the central Lake District, all drip courses and other details had to be in slate, but ornamented lintels like those in Lancashire and Yorkshire were carved where sandstone could be had, such as in the Eden Valley. While timber framing is almost non-existent, clay buildings with cruck roofs (termed 'clay dabbins') where built on the Solway Plain to the north. The bank barn was a distinctive Cumbrian feature, built into a slope so that the ground floor animal stalls and the first floor barn could both be accessed from ground level. Such barns could be elaborated with a covered pentice or a timber 'spinning gallery'. Quakerism took hold early in Cumbria, and several 17th century meeting houses survive.

=== Yorkshire Dales ===
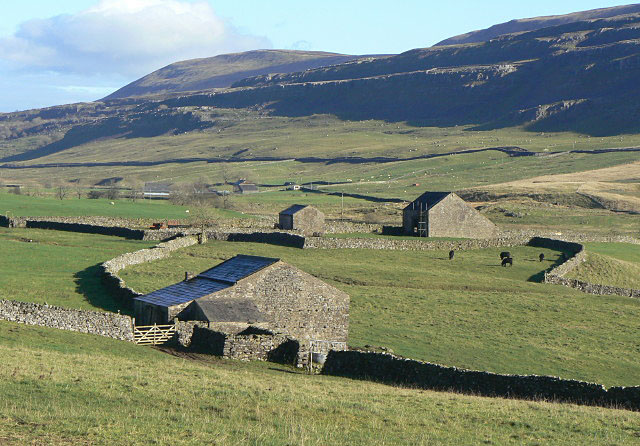
Field barns near Ingleton, N Yorks.

Construction was generally of grey carboniferous limestone, but otherwise details were similar to the Southern Pennines. Mullioned windows in gables were occasionally stepped, with the central light being higher, an effect somewhat similar to a Venetian window. Front door lintels could have a castellated ornamentation in the 17th century. The so-called 'Yorkshire sash', or horizontally sliding sash, may be found across the country, not just in Yorkshire. Isolated field barns, now generally disused, are very common in the Dales.

=== East Yorkshire and Humberside ===
Limestone rubble walling was generally combined with pantiles, replacing thatch. Extensive timber framing survives in the city of York, some as early as the 14th century. Brick was used early, being seen at Hull Minster and city walls in the 14th century.

=== North-East England ===
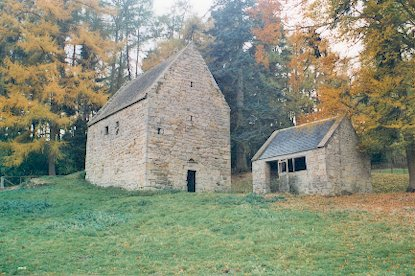
Woodhouses Bastle, Northumb.

As in Cumbria, medieval insecurity led to the construction of fortified towers and bastles. Poverty meant that other vernacular building started late, with survivals being rare before the 18th century. In this respect the vernacular is more akin to that of Scotland than England.

== Publicly accessible examples ==
While most vernacular buildings are still inhabited, some are owned by bodies such as the National Trust and can be visited. These include:

- Alfriston Clergy House, East Sussex
- Avebury Manor, Wiltshire
- Black Middens Bastle, Northumberland
- Berney Arms Windmill, Norfolk
- The Brontë Parsonage, West Yorkshire
- Houghton Mill, Cambridgeshire
- Kelmscott Manor, Oxfordshire
- Lavenham Guildhall, Suffolk
- Little Moreton Hall, Cheshire
- Lytes Cary, Somerset
- Tintagel Old Post Office, Cornwall
- Townend, Cumbria
- Washington Old Hall, Durham

Collections of re-erected vernacular buildings can also be seen at several open air museums, such as the Avoncroft Museum of Historic Buildings, Beamish, the Chiltern Open Air Museum and the Weald and Downland Living Museum.

== Revival ==
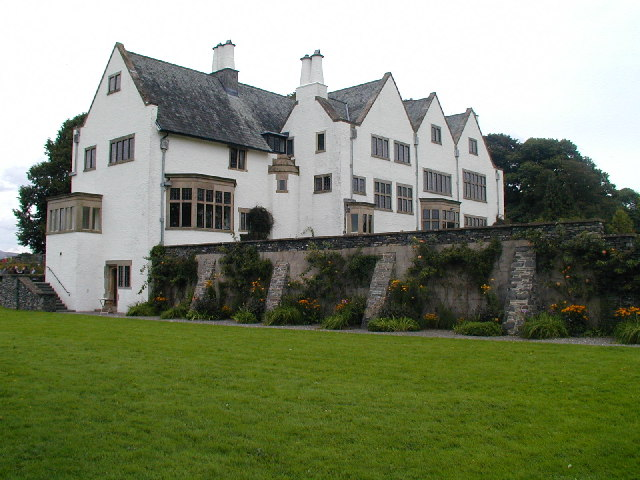
Blackwell, a self-conscious evocation of Cumbrian vernacular architecture, designed by Baillie Scott.

In the later 19th century, vernacular styles again became popular, as a reaction against the increasing industrialisation and homogenisation of the country. This 'vernacular revival' was associated with William Morris, the Arts and Crafts Movement and the utopian ideal of 'Merrie England'. However, it differed from the original vernacular movement because it was promoted by the wealthiest in society, especially industrialists building country retreats, and its buildings were designed by trained architects such as Edwin Lutyens, C.F.A. Voysey and Baillie Scott.

== See also ==
- Vernacular architecture
- Polite architecture
- Architecture of England
- Tudor architecture
- Architectural pattern book
- Georgian architecture
- Arts and Crafts movement
