= Architecture of England =

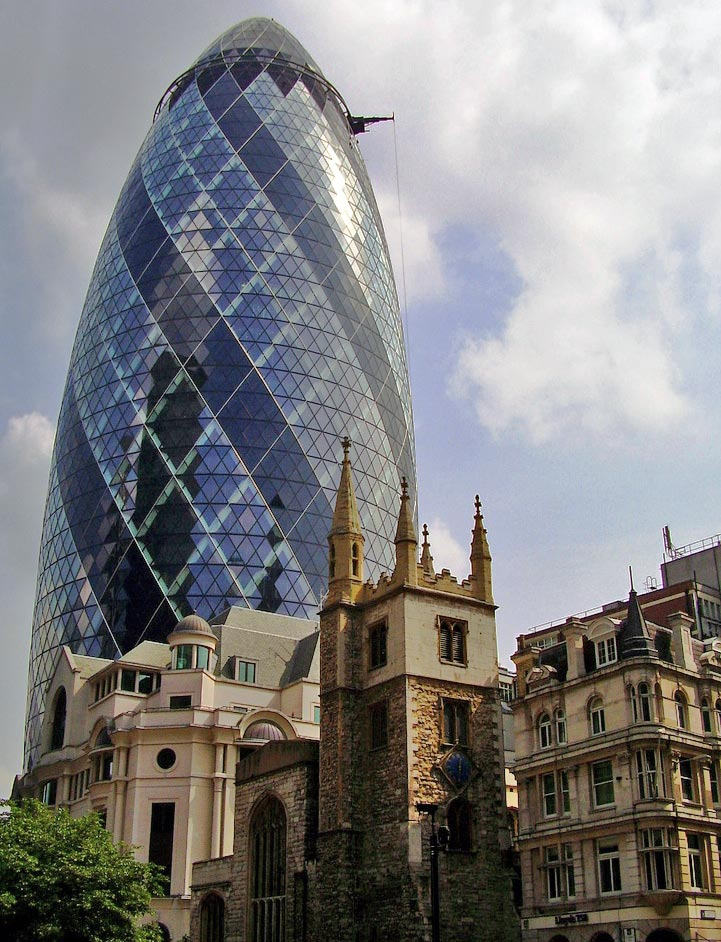
Norman Foster's 'Gherkin' (2004) rises above the sixteenth century St Andrew Undershaft in the City of London.

The architecture of England is the architecture of the historic Kingdom of England up to 1707, and of England since then, but is deemed to include buildings created under English influence or by English architects in other parts of the world, particularly in the English overseas possessions and the later British Empire, which developed into the present-day Commonwealth of Nations.

Apart from Anglo-Saxon architecture, the major non-vernacular forms employed in England before 1900 originated elsewhere in western Europe, chiefly in France and Italy, while 20th-century Modernist architecture derived from both European and American influences. Each of these foreign modes became assimilated within English architectural culture and gave rise to local variation and innovation, producing distinctive national forms. Among the most characteristic styles originating in England are the Perpendicular Gothic of the late Middle Ages, High Victorian Gothic and the Queen Anne style.

== Prehistoric architecture ==
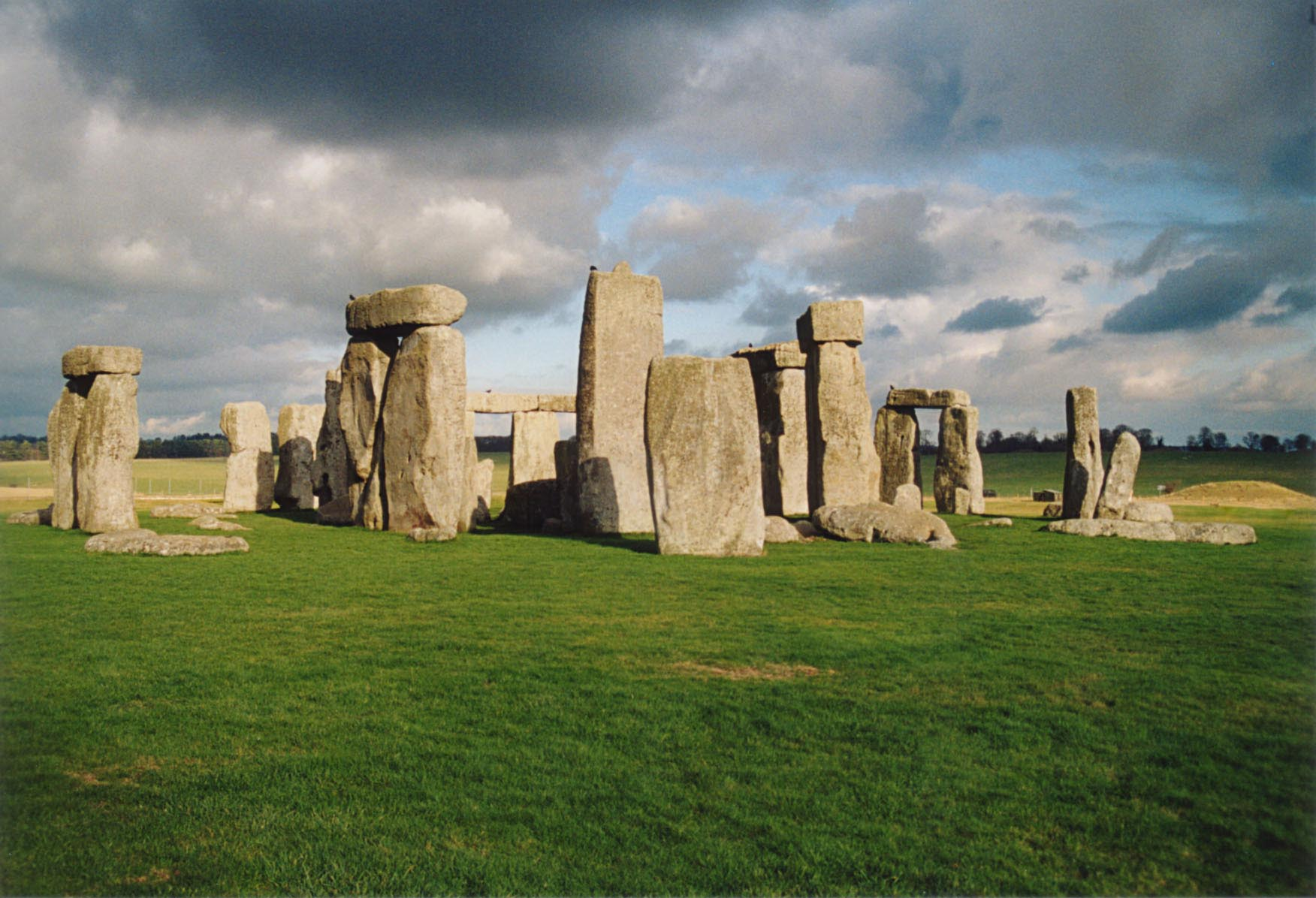
Stonehenge

The earliest known examples of architecture in England are the megalithic tombs of the Neolithic, such as those at Wayland's Smithy and the West Kennet Long Barrow. These cromlechi are common over much of Atlantic Europe: present day Spain; Brittany; Great Britain; and Ireland. Radiocarbon dating has shown them to be, as historian John Davies says, "the first substantial, permanent constructions of man and that the earliest of them are nearly 1,500 years older than the first of the pyramids of Egypt." The Neolithic henges of Avebury and Stonehenge are two of the largest and most famous megalithic monuments in the world. The structure is an annual calendar, but the reason for the massive size is unknown with any certainty, suggestions include agriculture, ceremonial use and interpreting the cosmos. With other nearby sites, including Silbury Hill, Beckhampton Avenue, and West Kennet Avenue, they form a UNESCO World Heritage Site called Stonehenge, Avebury and Associated Sites.

Numerous examples of Bronze Age and Iron Age architecture can be seen in England. Megalithic burial monuments, either individual barrows (also known, and marked on modern British Ordnance Survey maps, as Tumuli,) or occasionally cists covered by cairns, are one form. The other is the defensive earthworks known as hill forts, such as Maiden Castle and Cadbury Castle. Archaeological evidence suggests that British Iron Age domestic architecture had a tendency towards circular dwellings, known as roundhouses.

== Roman architecture ==
The Roman period brought the construction of the first large-scale buildings in Britain, but very little survives above ground besides fortifications. These include sections of Hadrian's Wall, Chester city walls and coastal forts such as those at Portchester, Pevensey and Burgh Castle, which have survived through incorporation into later castles. Other structures still standing include a lighthouse at Dover Castle, now part of a church. In most cases, only foundations, floors and the bases of walls attest to the structure of former buildings. Some of these were on a grand scale, such as the palace at Fishbourne and the thermae at Bath. The more substantial buildings of the Roman period adhered closely to the style of Roman structures elsewhere, although traditional Iron Age building methods remained in general use for humbler dwellings, especially in rural areas.

== Medieval architecture ==
=== Anglo-Saxon architecture ===
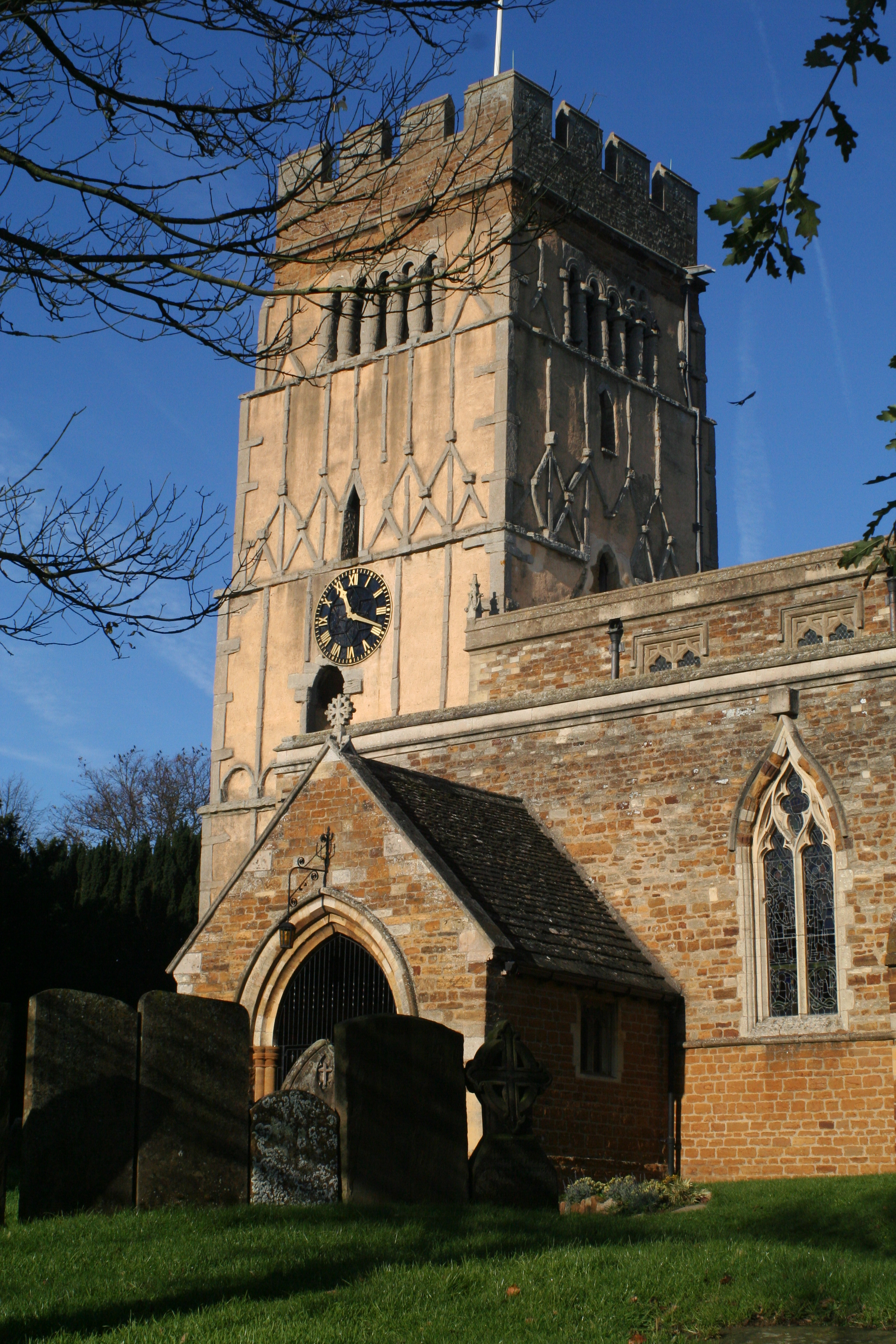
All Saints' Church, Earls Barton

Architecture of the Anglo-Saxon period exists only in the form of churches. The earliest examples date from the 7th century, notably at Bradwell-on-Sea and Escomb, but the majority from the 10th and 11th centuries. Due to the systematic destruction and replacement of English cathedrals and monasteries by the Normans, no major Anglo-Saxon churches survive; the largest extant example is at Brixworth.

The main material is ashlar masonry, sometimes accompanied by details in reused Roman brick. Anglo-Saxon churches are typically high and narrow and consist of a nave and a narrower chancel; these are often accompanied by a west tower. Some feature porticus (projecting chambers) to the west or to the north and south, creating a cruciform plan. Characteristic features include quoins in "long-and-short work" (alternating vertical and horizontal blocks) and small windows with rounded or triangular tops, deeply splayed or in groups of two or three divided by squat columns. The most common form of external decoration is lesene strips (thin vertical or horizontal strips of projecting stone), typically combined with blind arcading. Notable examples of this exist at Earls Barton, Bradford-on-Avon and Barton-upon-Humber.

=== Norman architecture ===
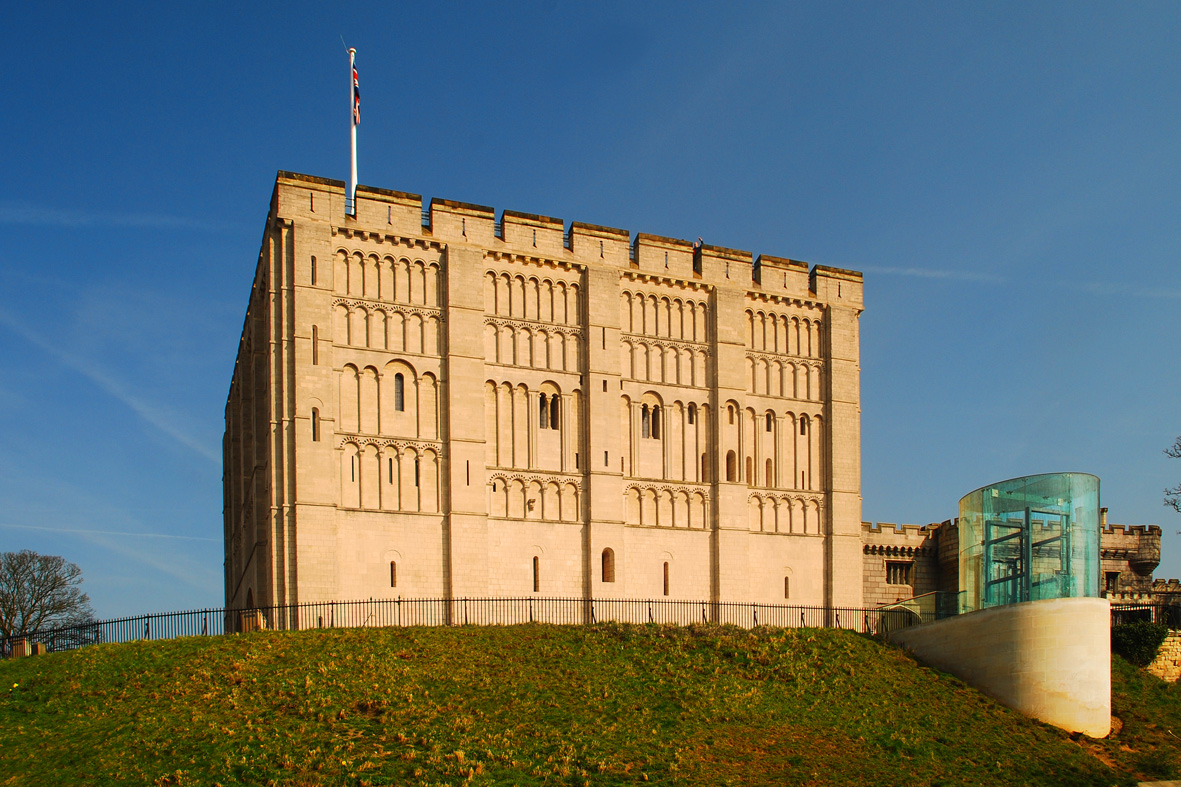
Norwich Castle: round arches are characteristic of the Romanesque style.

In the 11th century the Normans were among Europe's leading exponents of Romanesque architecture, a style which had begun to influence English church building before 1066, but became the predominant mode in England with the huge wave of construction that followed the Norman Conquest. The Normans destroyed a large proportion of England's churches and built Romanesque replacements, a process which encompassed all of England's cathedrals. Most of the latter were later partially or wholly rebuilt in Gothic style, and although many still preserve substantial Romanesque portions, only Durham Cathedral remains a predominantly Romanesque structure (along with St Alban's and Southwell, abbey churches in the medieval period). Even Durham displays significant transitional features leading towards the emergence of Gothic. Romanesque churches are characterised by rounded arches, arcades supported by massive cylindrical piers, groin vaults and low-relief sculptural decoration. Distinctively Norman features include decorative chevron patterns.

In the wake of the invasion William I and his lords built numerous wooden motte-and-bailey castles to impose their control on the native population. Many were subsequently rebuilt in stone, beginning with the Tower of London. There are also a very small number of domestic Norman buildings still standing, for example Jew's House, Lincoln; manor houses at Saltford and Boothby Pagnall; and fortified manor houses such as Oakham Castle.

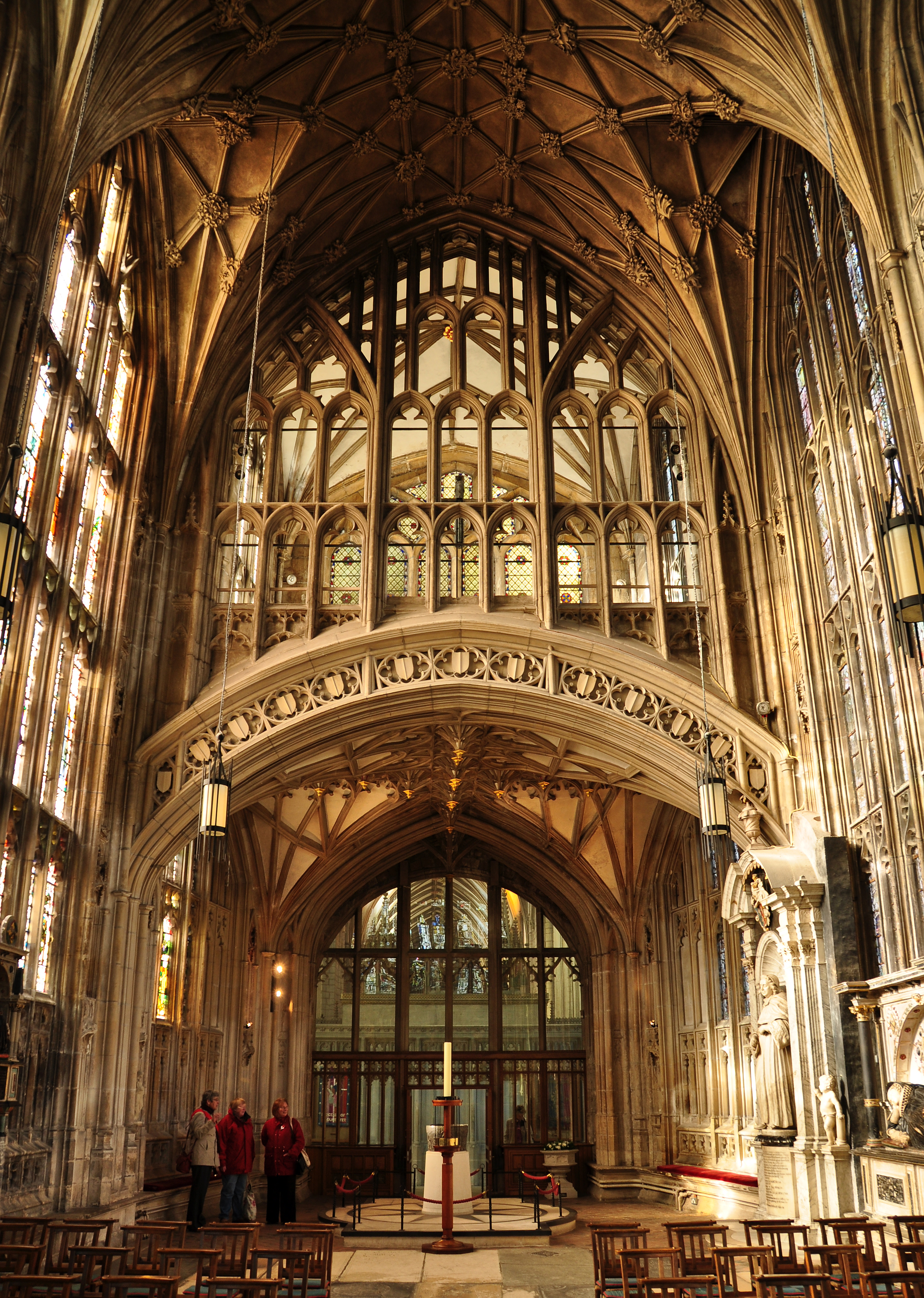
Perpendicular Gothic lady chapel of Gloucester Cathedral

=== Gothic architecture ===
The major buildings of the Late Middle Ages and the first centuries of the Early Modern Period were constructed in the predominant late medieval European style of Gothic architecture. Art-historical periodisations are Early English or First Pointed (late 12th–late 13th centuries), Decorated Gothic or Second Pointed (late 13th–late 14th centuries), and Perpendicular Gothic or Third Pointed (14th–17th centuries). The architect and art historian Thomas Rickman's Attempt to Discriminate the Style of Architecture in England, first published in 1812, divided Gothic architecture in the British Isles into three stylistic periods. Rickman identified the period of architecture from William the Conqueror (r. 1066–87) to Henry II (r. 1154–89) as Norman; from Richard the Lionheart (r. 1189–99) to Edward I (r. 1272–1307) as Early English; the reigns of Edward II (r. 1307–27) and Edward III (r. 1327–77) as Decorated, and from Richard II (r. 1377–99) to Henry VIII (r. 1509–47) as Perpendicular.

From the 15th century, under the House of Tudor, the prevailing Gothic style is commonly known as Tudor architecture, being ultimately succeeded by Elizabethan architecture and Renaissance architecture under Elizabeth I (r. 1558–1603). Rickman excluded from his scheme most new buildings after Henry VIII's reign, calling the style of "additions and rebuilding" in the later 16th and earlier 17th centuries "often much debased". Architect and art historian Edmund Sharpe published in 1851 The Seven Periods of English Architecture, in which he identified a pre-Gothic Transitional Period (1145–90) after the Norman period, in which pointed arches and round arches were employed together. Focusing on the windows, Sharpe dubbed Rickman's first Gothic style the Lancet Period (1190–1245); divided the second into first the Geometrical (1245–1315) and then the Curvilinear (1315–1360); and named the third style Rectilinear (1360–1550).

This last Gothic style was typified by large windows, four-centred arches, straight vertical and horizontal lines in the tracery, and regular arch-topped rectangular panelling. Perpendicular was the prevailing style of Late Gothic architecture in England from the 14th century to the 17th century. Perpendicular was unique to the country: no equivalent arose in Continental Europe or elsewhere in the British Isles. Of all the Gothic architectural styles, Perpendicular was the first to experience a second wave of popularity from the 18th century on in Gothic Revival architecture.

=== Vernacular architecture ===
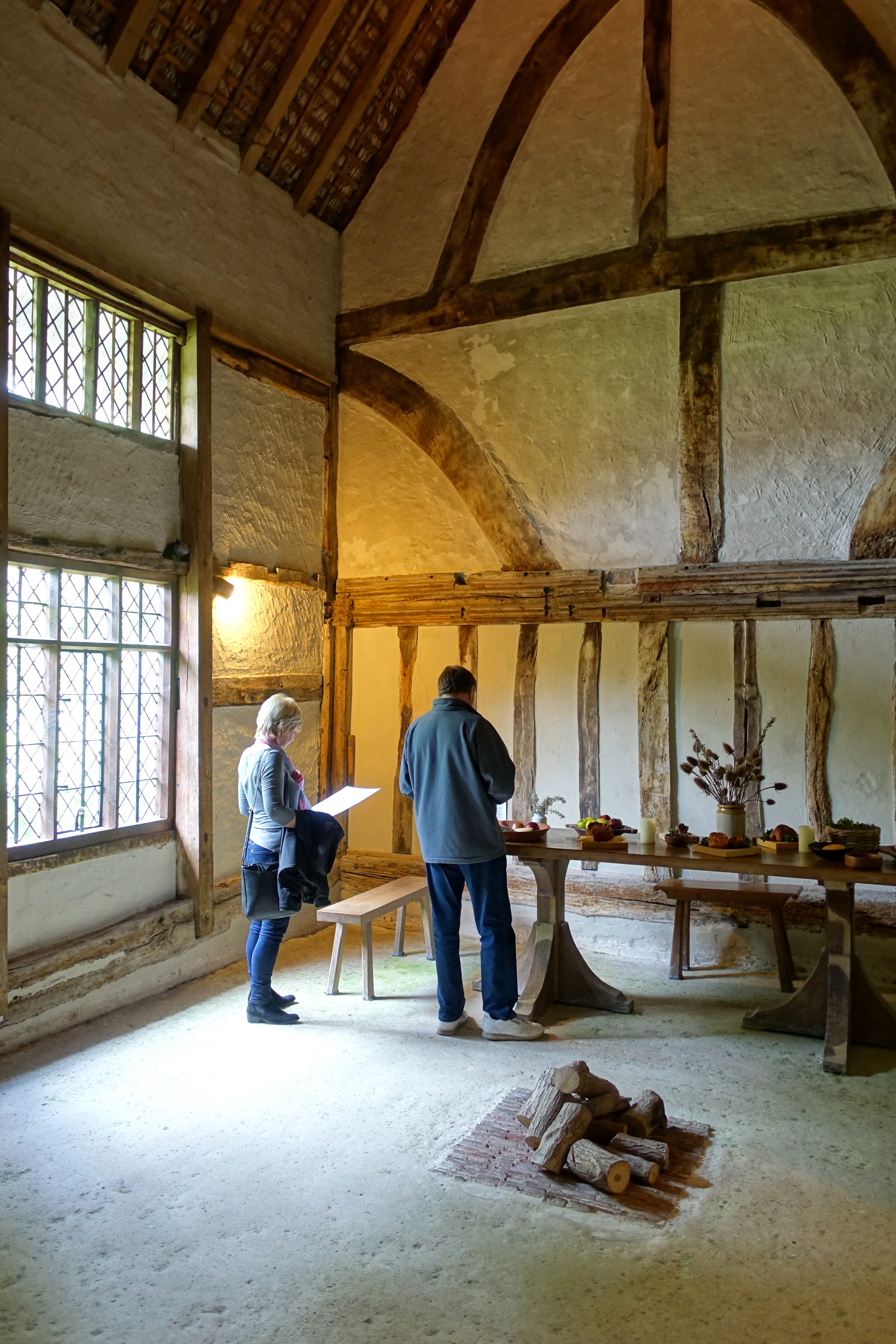
Hall in Alfriston Clergy House, 14th-century

Little survives of the vernacular architecture of the medieval period due to the use of perishable materials for the great majority of buildings. Most domestic buildings were built on timber frames, usually with wattle and daub infill. Roofs were typically covered with thatch; wooden shingles were also employed, and from the 12th century tile and slate came into use in some areas. Also around the 12th century, the cruck frame was introduced, increasing the size of timber-framed vernacular buildings. Typically, larger houses of this period were based around a great hall open from floor to roof. One bay at each end was split into two storeys and used for service rooms and private rooms for the owner. Even quite high up the social scale houses were small by modern standards, except for the very wealthy.

Buildings surviving from this period included moated manor houses of which Ightham Mote is a notable late medieval example, and Wealden hall houses such as Alfriston Clergy House. Tintagel Old Post Office is a 14th-century manor house in a part of the country where stone was the typical building material for better houses. Little Moreton Hall, a large manor house begun in 1504-08 and later extended, is a famous showpiece of decorative half-timbering. Near the dangerous Scottish border, the peel tower was a type of tower house or small castle; in Scotland they were even more common. The bastle house was a two-storey version, continuing what had been a common form of house for the better-off across the country in the late Anglo-Saxon and Norman periods.

== Tudor transition ==
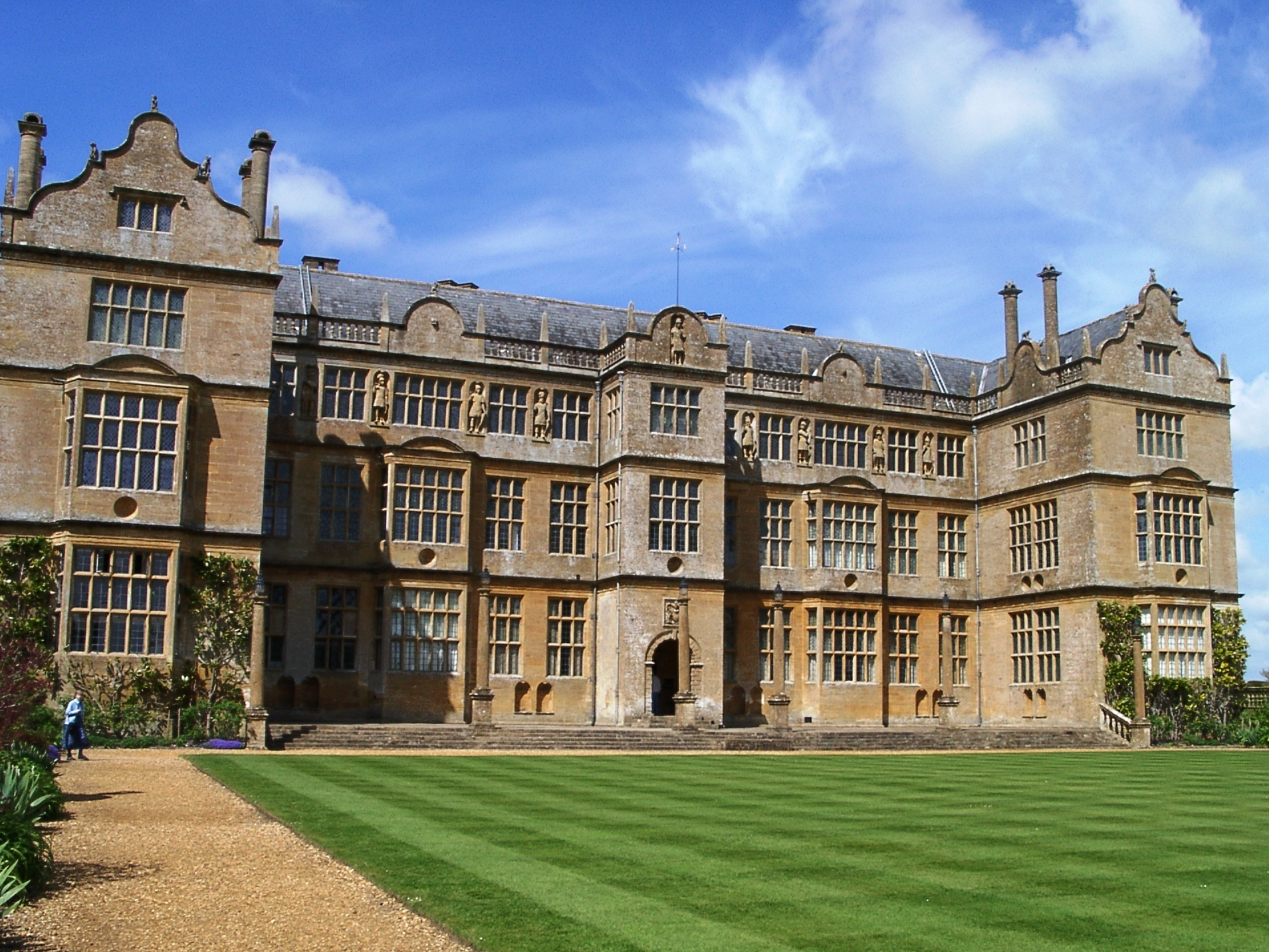
Montacute House, near Yeovil, Somerset. Built 1598

The Tudor period constitutes a transitional phase, in which the organic continuity and technical innovation of the medieval era gave way to centuries in which architecture was dominated by a succession of attempts to revive earlier styles.

The Perpendicular Gothic style reached its culmination in the reign of Henry VII and the early years of Henry VIII, with the construction of King's College Chapel, Cambridge and Henry VII's Chapel at Westminster Abbey. However, the Reformation brought an effective halt to church-building in England which continued in most parts of the country until the 19th century.

By the time of Henry VII's accession castle-building in England had come to an end and under the Tudors ostentatious unfortified country houses and palaces became widespread, built either in stone or in brick, which first became a common building material in England in this period. Characteristic features of the early Tudor style included imposing gatehouses (a vestige of the castle), flattened pointed arches in the Perpendicular Gothic manner, square-headed windows, decoratively shaped gables and large ornate chimneys. Outstanding surviving examples of early Tudor palatial architecture include Hampton Court Palace and Layer Marney Tower.

Over the course of the 16th century Classical features derived from the Renaissance architecture of Italy exerted an increasing influence, initially on surface decoration but in time shaping the entire design of buildings, while the use of medieval features declined. This development gave rise to palatial stone dwellings or prodigy houses such as Hardwick Hall and Montacute House.

At the vernacular level, the Tudor period is traditionally considered to represent the start of the Great Rebuilding. Many manor houses and farmhouses were built or rebuilt at this time, with first floor rooms replacing the traditional open hall.

== Style revivals ==
=== Stuart architecture ===
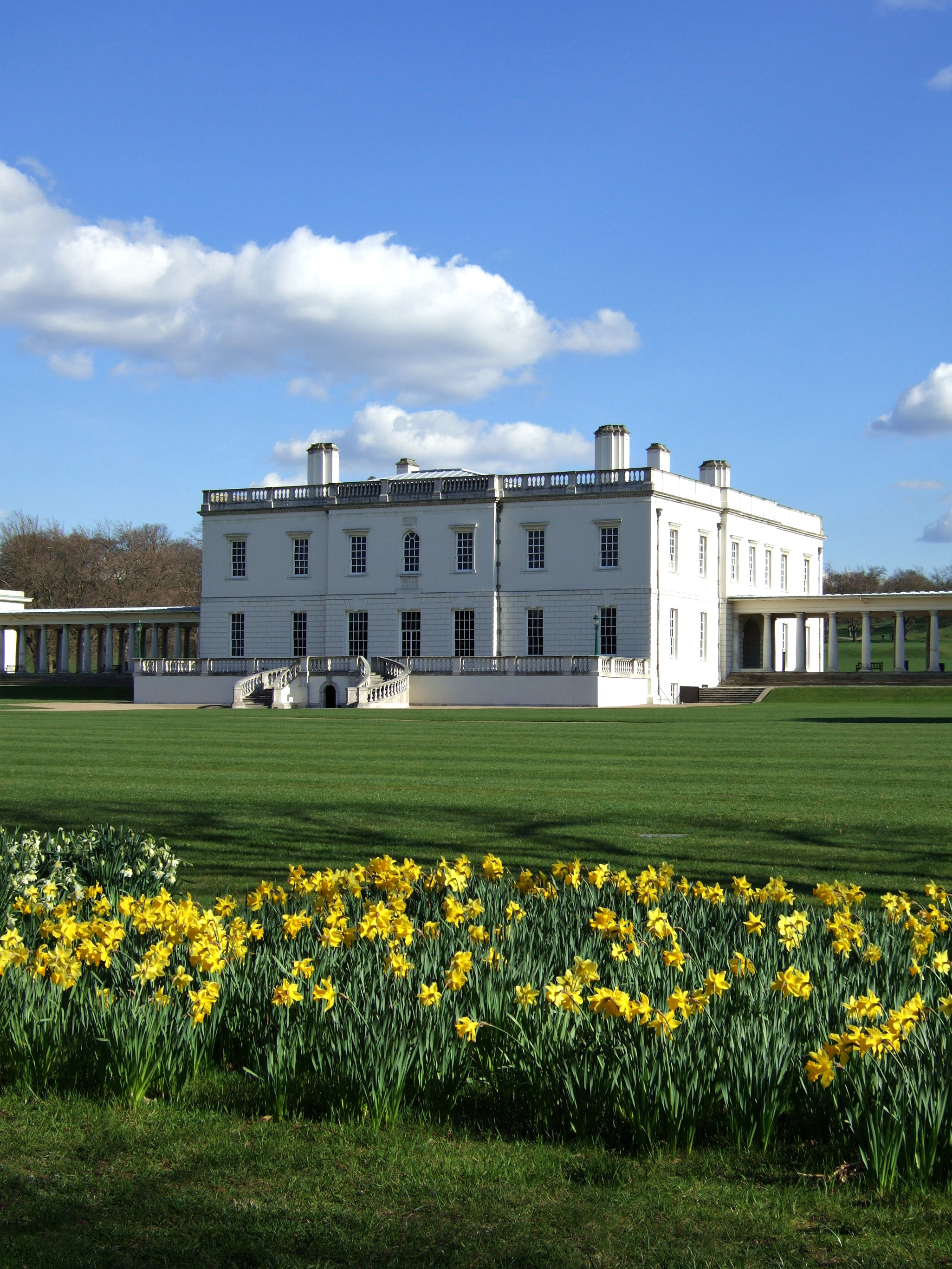
The Queen's House, Greenwich

During the 17th century, the continuing advance of Classical forms overrode the eclecticism of English Renaissance architecture, which gave way to a more uniform style derived from continental models, chiefly from Italy. This entailed a retreat from the structural sophistication of Gothic architecture to forms derived from the more primitive construction methods of Classical antiquity. The style was typified by square or round-headed windows and doors, flat ceilings, colonnades, pilasters, pediments and domes. Classical architecture in England tended to be relatively plain and simple in comparison with the contemporaneous Baroque architecture of the continent, being influenced above all by the Palladian style of Italy. This was first introduced to England by Inigo Jones and typified by his Queen's House at Greenwich.

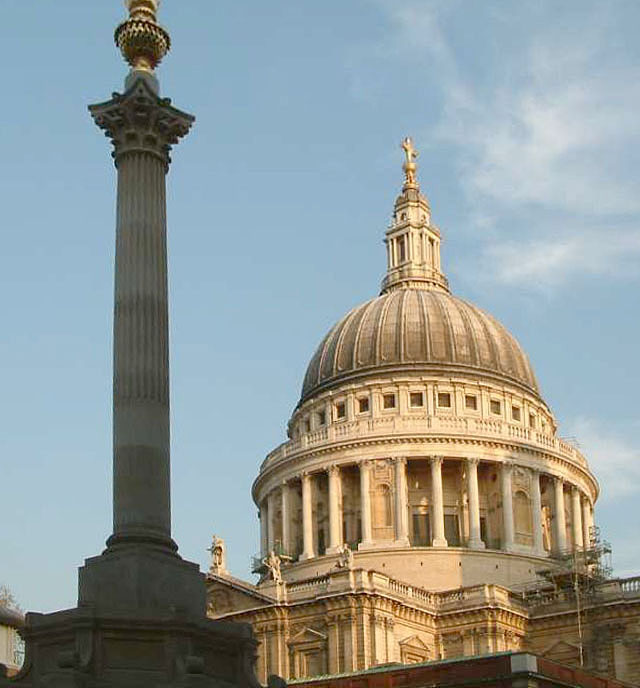
The dome of St Paul's Cathedral, designed by Sir Christopher Wren

The Great Fire of London in 1666 forced the reconstruction of much of the city, which was the only part of the country to see a significant amount of church-building between the Reformation and the 19th century. Sir Christopher Wren was employed to replace many of the destroyed churches, but his master plan for rebuilding London as a whole was rejected. Wren's churches exemplify the distinctive English approach to church-building in the Classical manner, which largely rejected the domes that typified the continental Baroque and employed a wide range of different forms of steeple, experimental efforts to find a substitute for the Gothic spire within a Classical mode. However, a dome featured very prominently in Wren's grandest construction, St Paul's Cathedral, the only English cathedral in any permutation of the Classical tradition.

The later 17th century saw Baroque architecture – a version of Classicism characterised by heavy massing and ostentatiously elaborate decoration – become widespread in England. Grand Baroque-style country houses began to appear in England during the 1690s, exemplified by Chatsworth House and Castle Howard. The most significant English Baroque architects after Wren were Sir John Vanbrugh and Nicholas Hawksmoor, who adapted the Baroque style to fit English tastes in houses such as Blenheim Palace, Seaton Delaval Hall and Easton Neston.

=== Georgian architecture ===
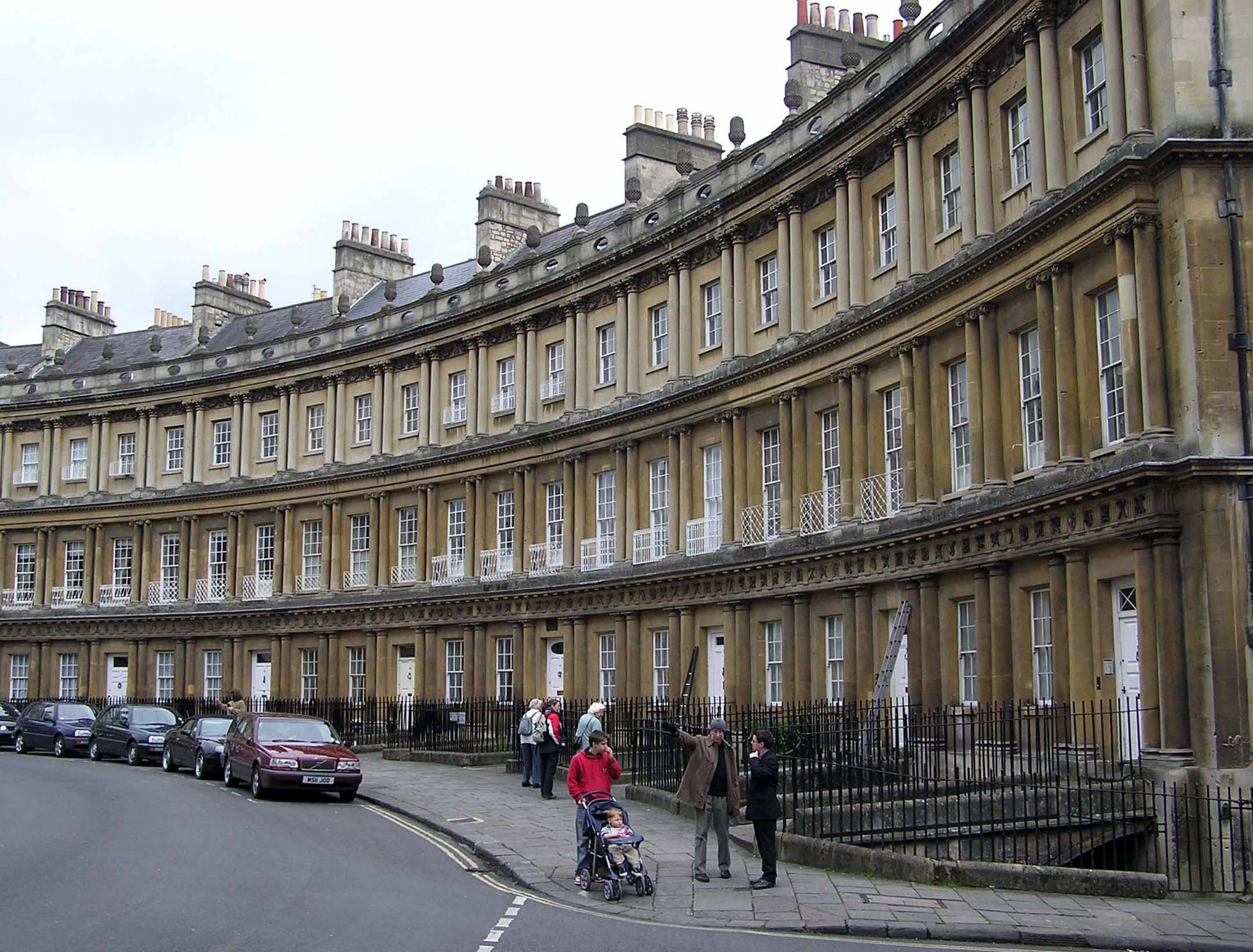
The Circus (Bath)

The 18th century saw a turn away from Baroque elaboration and a reversion to a more austere approach to Classicism. This shift initially brought a return to the Italian Palladianism that had characterised the earliest manifestations of Classical architecture in England. Later Neoclassical architecture increasingly idealised ancient Greek forms, which were viewed as representing Classicism in its original "purity", as against Roman forms. Country houses representing this style include Woburn Abbey and Kedleston Hall. This period also saw the emergence of an increasingly planned approach to urban expansion, and the systematic, simultaneous construction of whole streets or squares, or even of entire districts, gave rise to new forms of domestic construction, the terrace and the crescent, as exemplified in Bath and in Bloomsbury and Mayfair in London. Among the notable architects practising in this era were Robert Adam, Sir William Chambers, John Wood and James Wyatt.

=== Victorian architecture ===
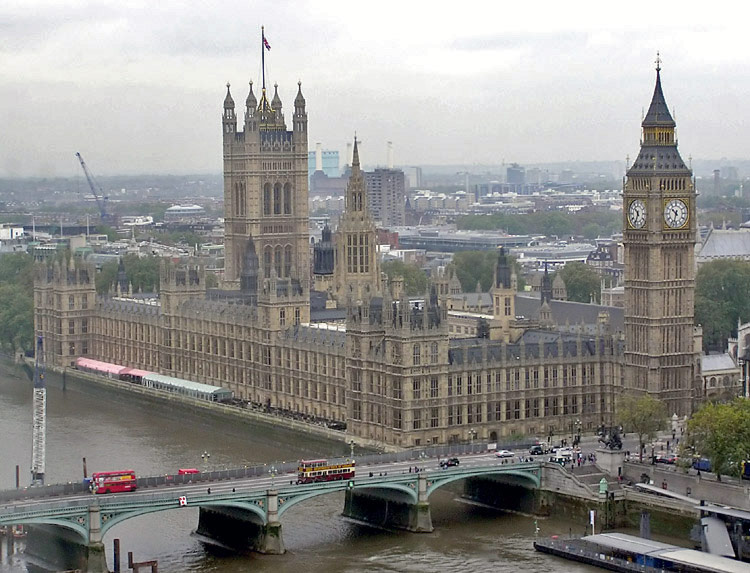
The Palace of Westminster, completed in 1870. Designed by Sir Charles Barry and A. W. N. Pugin

The 19th century saw a fragmentation of English architecture, as Classical forms continued in widespread use but were challenged by a series of distinctively English revivals of other styles, drawing chiefly on Gothic, Renaissance and vernacular traditions but incorporating other elements as well. This ongoing historicism was counterposed by a resumption of technical innovation, which had been largely in abeyance since the Renaissance but was now fuelled by new materials and techniques derived from the Industrial Revolution, particularly the use of iron and steel frames, and by the demand for new types of building. The rapid growth and urbanisation of the population entailed an immense amount of new domestic and commercial construction, while the same processes combined with a religious revival to bring about a resumption of widespread church building. Mechanised manufacturing, railways and public utilities required new forms of building, while the new industrial cities invested heavily in grand civic buildings and the huge expansion and diversification of educational, cultural and leisure activities likewise created new demands on architecture.

The Gothic revival was a development which emerged in England and whose influence, except in church building, was largely restricted to the English-speaking world. It had begun on a small scale in the 18th century under the stimulus of Romanticism, a trend initiated by Horace Walpole's house Strawberry Hill. However, widespread Gothic construction began only in the 19th century, led by the renewal of church building but spreading to secular construction. Early Gothic revival architecture was whimsical and unsystematic, but in the Victorian era the revival developed an abstract rigour and became a movement driven by cultural, religious and social concerns which extended far beyond architecture, seeing the Gothic style and the medieval way of life as a route to the spiritual regeneration of society. The first great ideologue of this movement was Augustus Welby Northmore Pugin, who together with Charles Barry designed the new Houses of Parliament, the grandest work of Victorian Gothic architecture.

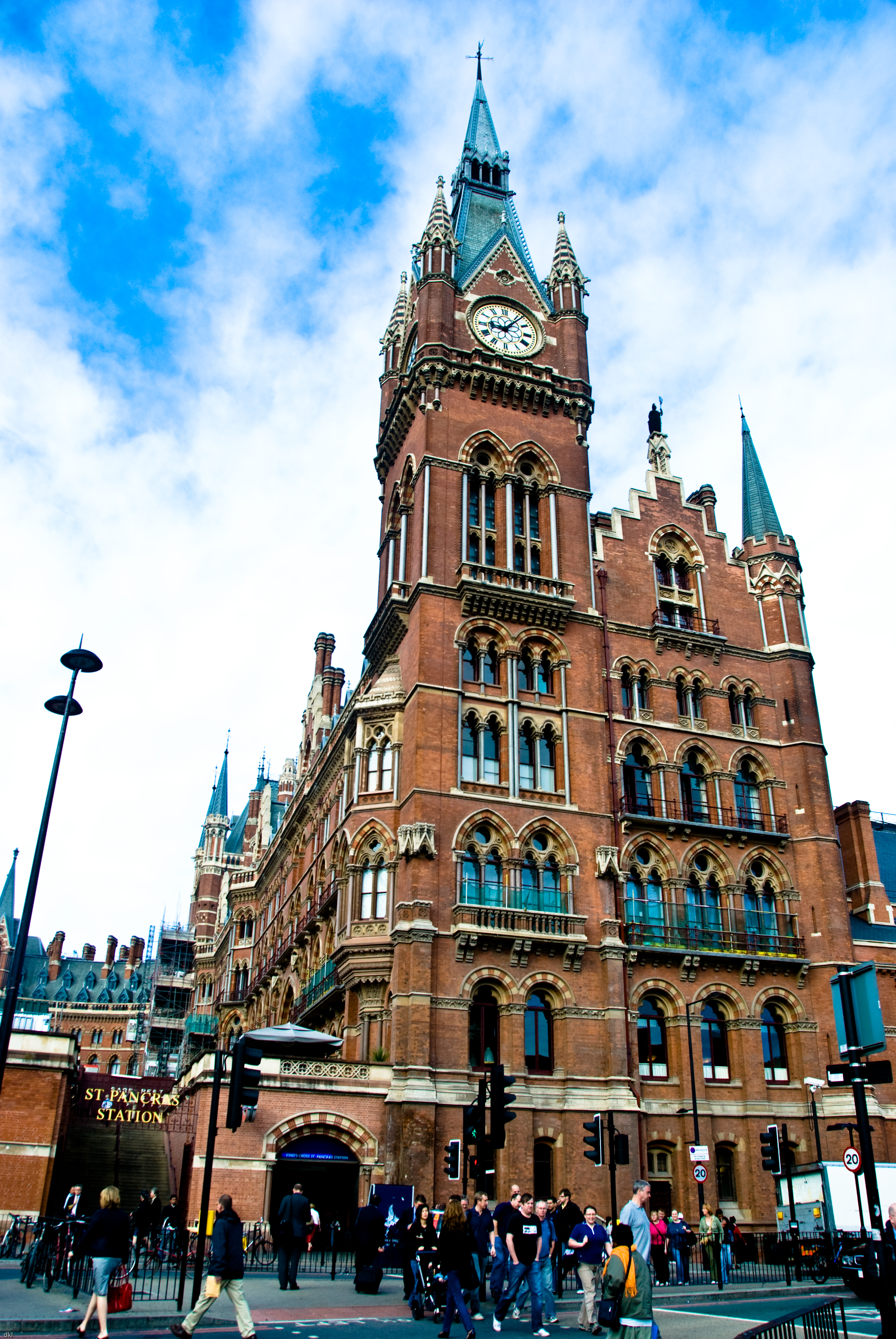
St Pancras Station, designed by George Gilbert Scott

The Parliament building's Perpendicular style reflects the predominance of the later forms of English Gothic in the early Victorian period, but this later gave way to a preference for plain Early English or French Gothic, and above all to a style derived from the architecture of medieval Italy and the Low Countries. This High Victorian Gothic was driven chiefly by the writings of John Ruskin, based on his observations of the buildings of Venice, while its archetypal practitioner was the church architect William Butterfield. It was characterised by heavy massing, sparse use of tracery or sculptural decoration and an emphasis on polychrome patterning created through the use of different colours of brick and stone. The Gothic revival also drove a widespread effort to restore deteriorating medieval churches, a practice which often went beyond restoration to involve extensive reconstruction. The most active exponent of this activity was also the most prolific designer of new Gothic buildings, George Gilbert Scott, whose work is exemplified by St Pancras Station. Other leading Victorian Gothic architects included G. E. Street, J. F. Pearson and G. F. Bodley.

The Victorian period saw a revival of interest in English vernacular building traditions, focusing chiefly on domestic architecture and employing features such as half-timbering and tile-hanging, whose leading practitioner was Richard Norman Shaw. This development too was shaped by much wider ideological considerations, strongly influenced by William Morris and the Arts and Crafts Movement. While its ethos shared much with the Gothic revival, its preoccupations were less religious and were connected with romantic socialism and a distaste for industrialisation and urban life. On the other hand, British industrial architecture both revived old styles and developed new ones. In the later 19th century vernacular elements mingled with forms drawn from the Renaissance architecture of England and the Low Countries to produce a synthesis dubbed the Queen Anne Style, which in fact bore very little resemblance to the architecture of that reign. While some architects of the period were ideologically committed to a particular manner, a tendency personified by Pugin, others were happy to move between styles. An exemplar of this approach was Alfred Waterhouse, whose works included buildings in Romanesque, Gothic and Renaissance styles and eclectic fusions between them.

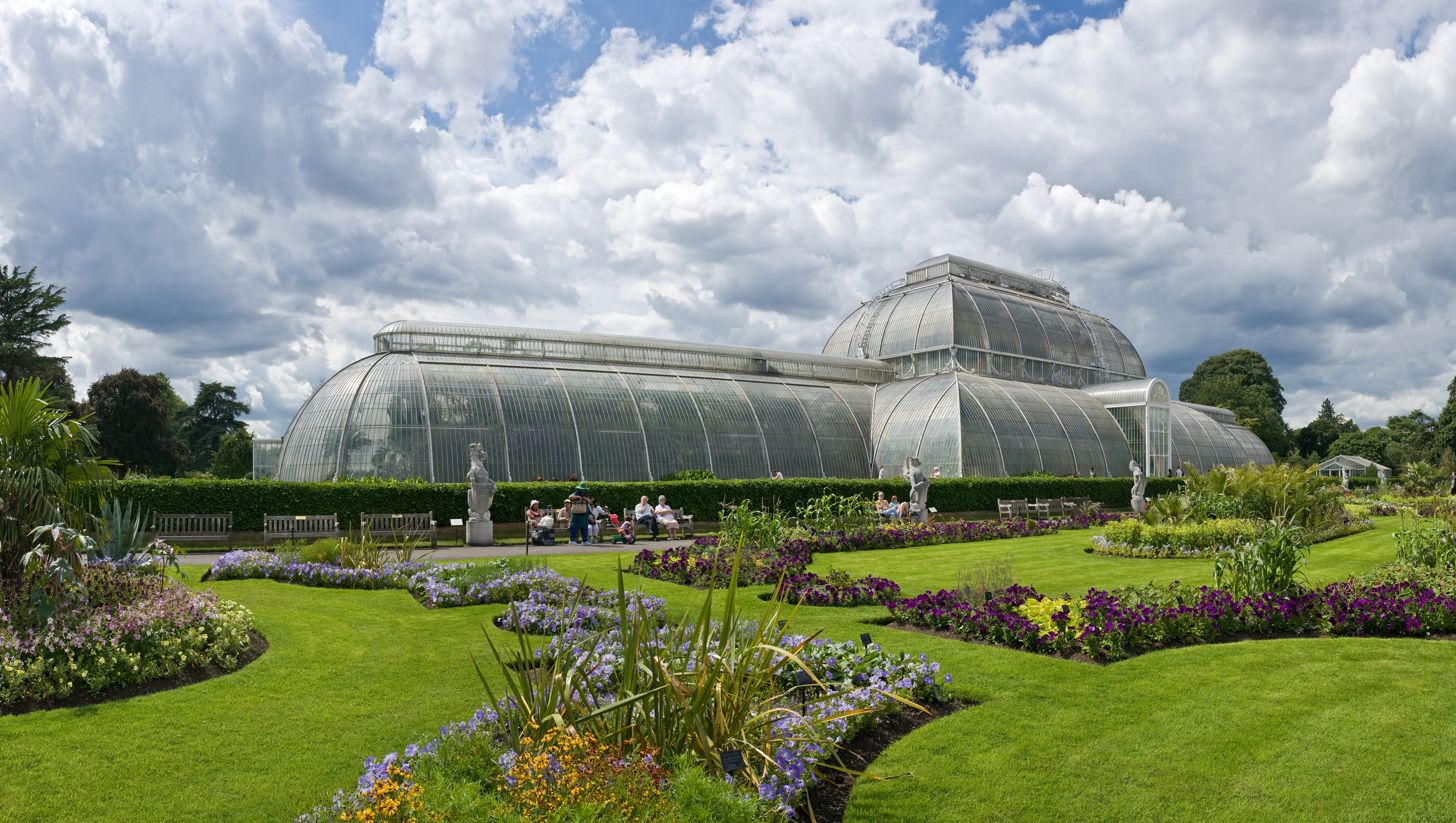
The Palm House at Kew Gardens, a key example of Victorian glasshouse construction

The new technology of iron and steel frame construction exerted an influence over many forms of building, although its use was often masked by traditional forms. It was highly prominent in two of the new forms of building that characterised Victorian architecture, railway station train sheds and glasshouses. The greatest exponent of the latter was Joseph Paxton, architect of the Crystal Palace.

In the 18th century a few English architects had emigrated to the colonies, but as the British Empire became firmly established in the 19th century many architects at the start of their careers made the decision to emigrate, several chose the United States but most went to Canada, Australia or New Zealand, as opportunities arose to meet the growing demand for buildings in these countries. Normally they adopted the style of architecture fashionable when they left England, though by the latter half of the century, improving transport and communications meant that even quite remote parts of the Empire had access to many publications, such as The Builder magazine. This enabled colonial architects to stay abreast of current fashion. Thus the influence of English architecture spread across the world. Several prominent 19th century architects produced designs that were executed by architects in the various colonies. For example, Sir George Gilbert Scott designed Bombay University & William Butterfield designed St Peter's Cathedral, Adelaide.

=== Historical styles in the 20th century ===
The last great exponent of late Victorian free Renaissance eclecticism was Edwin Lutyens, and his shift into the Classical mode after 1900 symbolised a wider retreat from the stylistic ferment of the 19th century to a plain and homogenous Classicism based on Georgian exemplars, an approach followed by many architects of the early 20th century, notably Herbert Baker and Reginald Blomfield. This Neo-Georgian manner, while not greatly favoured in later decades by the architectural profession or architecture critics, has remained popular with clients and conservative commentators, notably Charles, Prince of Wales. Domestic architecture throughout the 20th century and beyond has continued to be strongly influenced by a homogenised version of Victorian vernacular revival styles. Some architects responded to modernism, and economic circumstances, by producing stripped-down versions of traditional styles; the work of Giles Gilbert Scott illustrates this well.

== Modern architecture ==
=== International Style ===
The International Style (also known as Modernism) emerged as a reaction against the world before the First World War, including historical architectural styles. Stylistically it was functional, drawing upon objects that were designed for a specific purpose such as Oceanliners. It emerged as an idea from continental Europe, but was of interest to some English architects. However it the arrival of emigre architects such as Mendelsohn and Lubetkin that galvanised the position of modern architecture within England.

The bombing of English cities created a housing shortage, in the post war years. To meet this many thousands (perhaps hundreds of thousands) of council houses in mock-vernacular style were built, giving working class people their first experience of private gardens and indoor sanitation. The demand was partly sated through the pre-fabrication of buildings within factories, giving rise to the "Pre-fab" .

=== Brutalist architecture ===
The reconstruction that followed the Second World War had a major impact upon English architecture. The austerity that followed the WWII meant that cost dictated many design decisions, however significant architectural movements emerged. One such movement was the native development of Brutalism. Its look was created though the desire to express how buildings were constructed, for example through the use of exposed concrete. Significant "New Brutalist" buildings were the Economist Building, the Hayward Gallery, the Barbican Arts Centre and the Royal National Theatre.

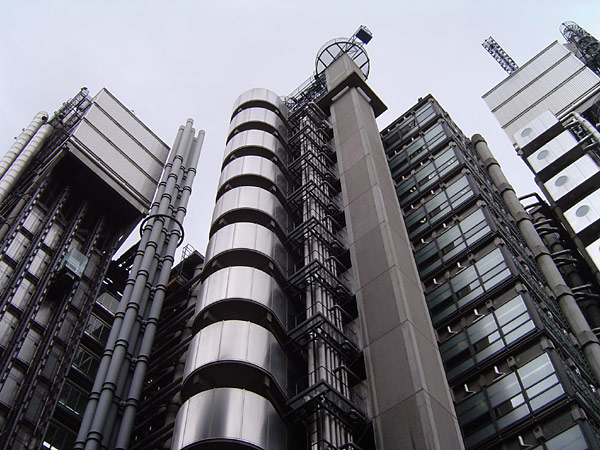
Lloyd's Building, City of London. Designed by Richard Rogers. Late 20th century

=== High-tech architecture ===
High-tech architecture emerged as an attempt to revitalise the language of Modernism, it drew inspiration from technology to create new architectural expression . The theorical work of Archigram provided significant inspiration of the High-tec movement. High-tech architecture is mostly associated with non-domestic buildings, perhaps due to the technological imagery. The two most prominent proponents were Richard Rogers and Norman Foster. Rogers' most iconic English building is the Lloyd's building, situated nearby is Foster's most famous 30 St Mary Axe building (nicknamed The Gherkin). Their respective influence continues into the current century.

=== Postmodern architecture ===
Postmodern architecture also emerged as an attempt to enrich Modern architecture. It was especially fashionable in the 1980s, when Modernism had fallen from favour, being associated with the welfare state. Many shopping malls and office complexes for example Broadgate used this style. Notable practitioners were James Stirling and Terry Farrell, although Farrell returned to modernism in the 1990s. A significant example of postmodernism is Robert Venturi's Sainsbury Wing of the National Gallery.

=== Contemporary architecture ===
Significant recent buildings, in a variety of styles, include: Will Alsop: Peckham Library, North Greenwich tube station; David Chipperfield: River and Rowing Museum, Hepworth Wakefield; Future Systems: Lord's Media Centre, Selfridges Building, Birmingham; Zaha Hadid, London Aquatics Centre; Ian Simpson: Beetham Tower, Manchester, Beetham Tower, Birmingham.

== See also ==
- Architecture of Wales
- British industrial architecture
- List of historic buildings and architects of the United Kingdom
- List of British architects
- Society of Architectural Historians of Great Britain
- Category:Lists of Grade I listed buildings in England by county
- The Georgian Group
- The Victorian Society
- The Twentieth Century Society
- English vernacular architecture

== Sources ==
- Aslet, Clive and Powers, Alan, The National Trust book of the English House Penguin/Viking, 1985, ISBN 0670801755
