= ARGE-SH =

German research institute and publisher

ARGE-SH - the Institute for Sustainable Constructions in Germany has been publishing specialized books on building construction and house building since 1947. (in German: “Arbeitsgemeinschaft für zeitgemäßes Bauen e. V.“)

It was founded in 1946 as a Research Institute for Cob-buildings, and for group-organized and subsidized self-help-construction of home buildings in Kiel, Germany. (Schleswig-Holstein)

ARGE-SH is an official Institute for Rationalization of housebuilding in Germany accredited by the Ministry of Interior of Schleswig-Holstein since 1972.

The main tasks are Consulting and research on sustainable and innovative constructions and building materials and the education and training of engineers, architects and companies of the building sector.

One of the current national projects is the Innovative Technologies of Thermal insulation Network, in international projects for example ARGE-SH is partner of the BEEN-Project (Baltic Energy Efficiency Network).
