= Cob (material) =

Building material made of soil and fiber

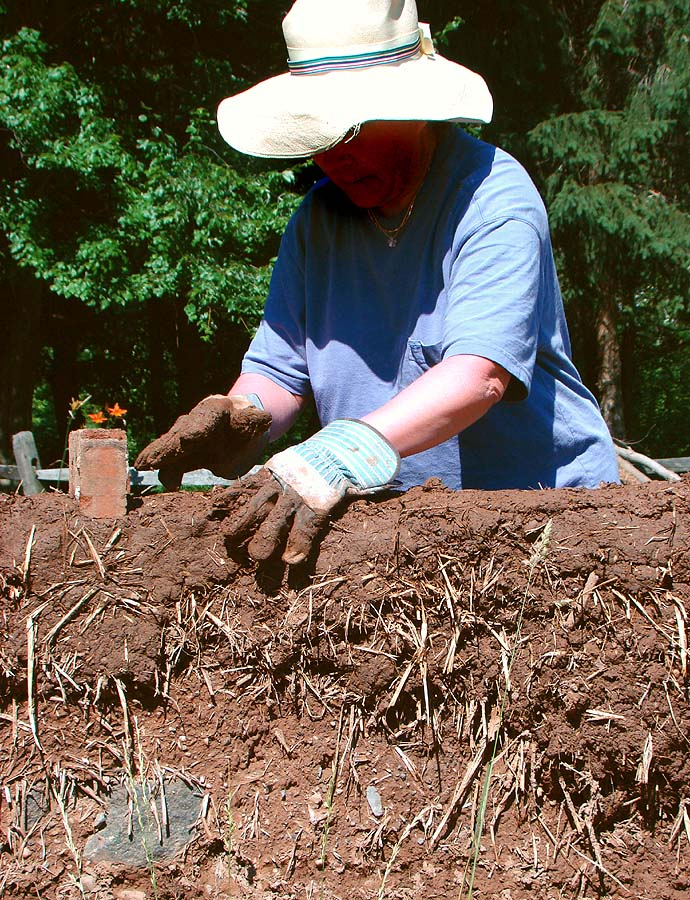
Building a wall out of cob

Cob, cobb, or clom (in Wales) is a natural building material made from subsoil, water, fibrous organic material (typically straw), and sometimes lime. The contents of subsoil vary, and if it does not contain the right mixture, it can be modified with sand or clay. Cob is fireproof, termite proof, resistant to seismic activity, and uses low-cost materials, although it is very labour intensive. It can be used to create artistic and sculptural forms, and its use has been revived in recent years by the natural building and sustainability movements.

In technical building and engineering documents, such as the Uniform Building Code of the western United States, cob may be referred to as "unburned clay masonry," when used in a structural context. It may also be referred to as "aggregate" in non-structural contexts, such as "clay and sand aggregate," or more simply "organic aggregate," such as where cob is a filler between post and beam construction.

== History and usage ==
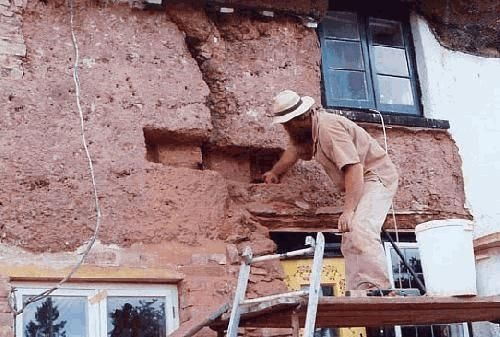
"Cob stitch" repair on old traditional cob cottage in Devon, England

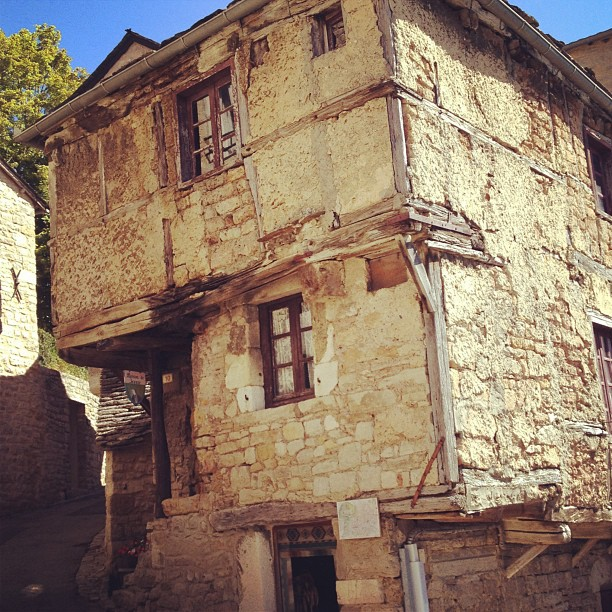
Maison de Jeanne, Sévérac-le-Château. Timber and cob construction

Cob is an English term attested to around the year 1600 for an ancient building material that has been used for building since prehistoric times. The use of this material in Iran is more than 4000 years old. The etymology of cob and cobbing is unclear, but in several senses means to beat or strike, which is how cob material is applied to a wall.

Many similar materials and methods of earthen building are used around the world, such as adobe, lump clay, puddled clay, chalk mud, wychert, clay daubins, swish (Asante Twi), torchis (French), bauge (French), bousille (French mud with moss), beaten clay-pahsa (Central Asia), and cat and clay.

Cob structures can be found in a variety of climates across the globe. European examples include:

- in England, notably in the counties of Devon and Cornwall in the West Country, and in East Anglia (where it is referred to as clay lump)
- in Wales, notably in rural Anglesey
- in Donegal Bay in Ulster and in Munster, South-West Ireland
- in Finisterre and Ille-et-Vilaine in Brittany, where many homes have survived over 500 years and are still inhabited

Some of the oldest human-made structures in Afghanistan are composed of rammed earth and cob. Cobwork (tabya) was used in the Maghreb and al-Andalus in the 11th and 12th centuries, and was described in detail by Ibn Khaldun in the 14th century.

Many old cob buildings can be found in Africa, the Middle East, and the southwestern United States like the Taos Pueblo. A number of cob cottages survive from mid-19th-century New Zealand.

Traditionally, English cob was made by mixing the clay-based subsoil with sand, straw and water using oxen to trample it. English soils contain varying amounts of chalk, and cob made with significant amounts of chalk are called chalk cob or wychert. The earthen mixture was then ladled onto a stone foundation in courses and trodden onto the wall by workers in a process known as cobbing. The construction would progress according to the time required for the prior course to dry. After drying, the walls would be trimmed and the next course built, with lintels for later openings such as doors and windows being placed as the wall takes shape.

The walls of a cob house are generally about 24 inches (61 cm) thick, and windows were correspondingly deep-set, giving the homes a characteristic internal appearance. The thick walls provided excellent thermal mass which was easy to keep warm in winter and cool in summer. Walls with a high thermal mass value act as a thermal buffer inside the home. The material has a long life-span even in rainy or humid climates, provided a tall foundation and large roof overhang are present.

Cob is fireproof, while "fire cob" (cob without straw or fiber) is a refractory material (the same material, essentially, as unfired common red brick), and historically, has been used to make chimneys, fireplaces, forges and crucibles. Without fiber, however, cob loses most of its tensile strength.

== Modern cob buildings ==
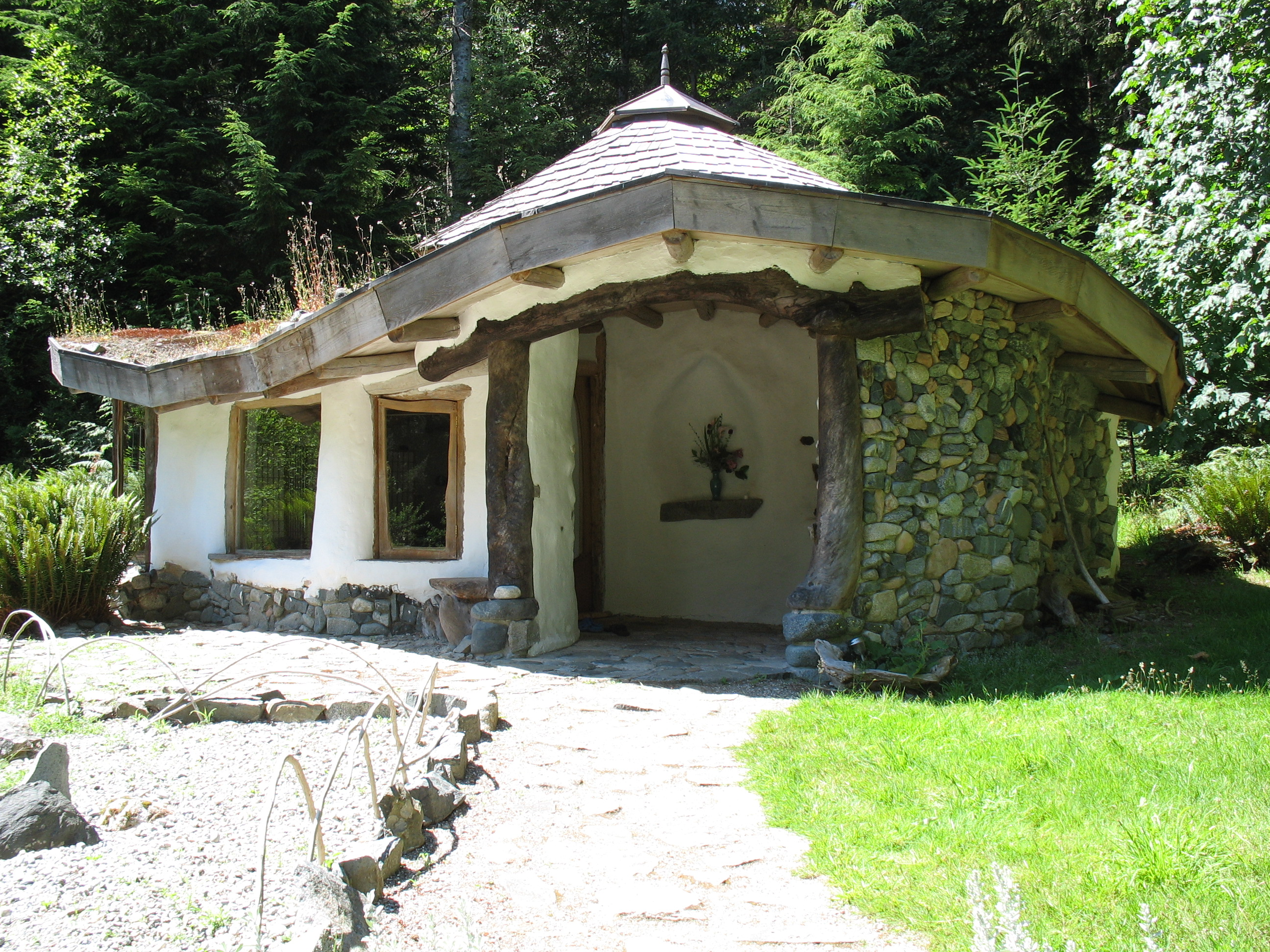
An example of a modern cob building in the Pacific Northwest style. The exterior cob wall is limewashed for an attractive, uniform appearance.

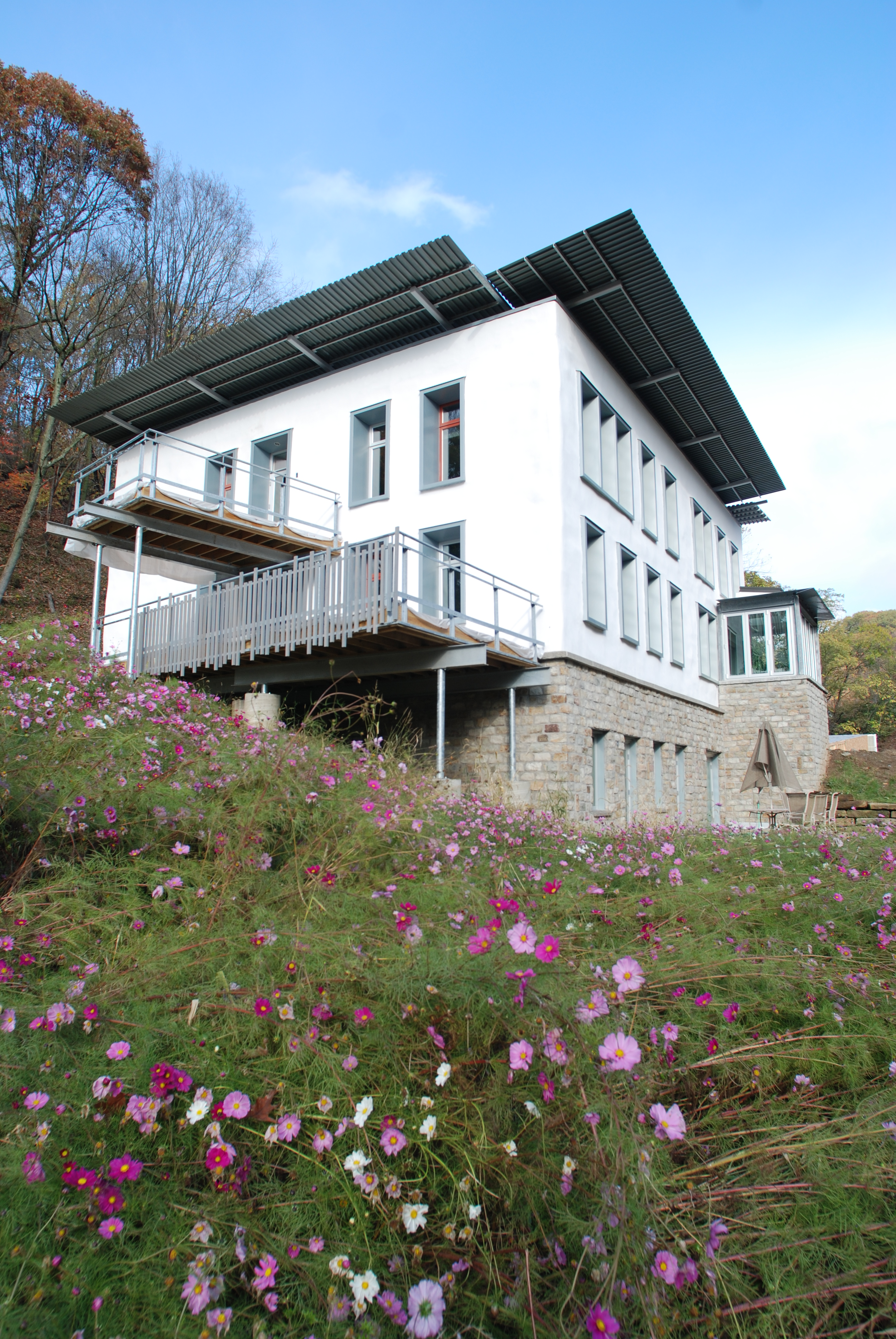
The Sota Construction Services Corporate Headquarters in Pittsburgh, Pennsylvania, United States, constructed of cob walls

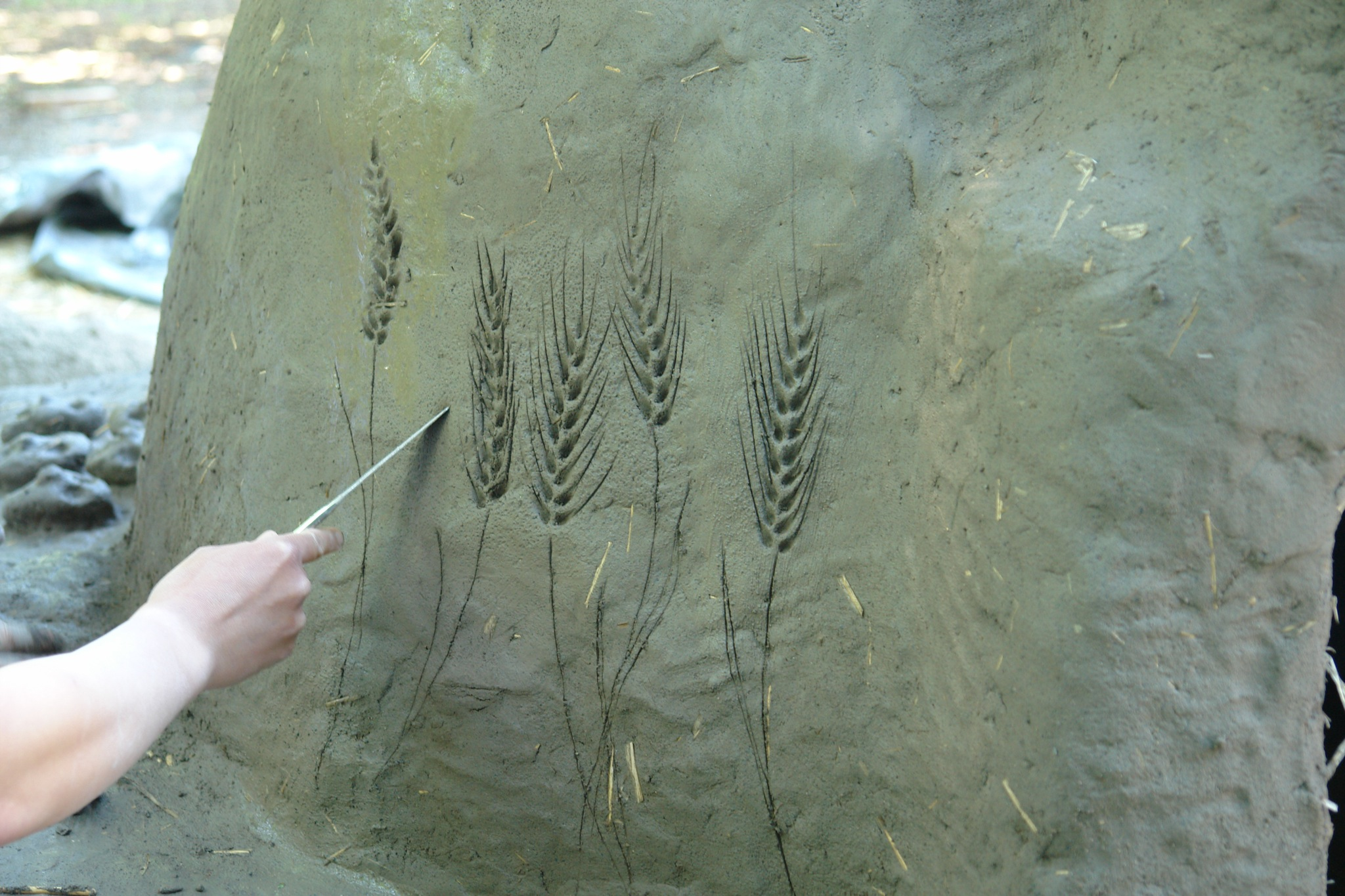
Decorating a cob oven

When Kevin McCabe constructed a two-story, four bedroom cob house in England, UK in 1994, it was reputedly the first cob residence built in the country in 70 years. His techniques remained very traditional; the only innovations he made were using a tractor to mix the cob and adding sand or shillet, a gravel of crushed shale, to reduce shrinkage.

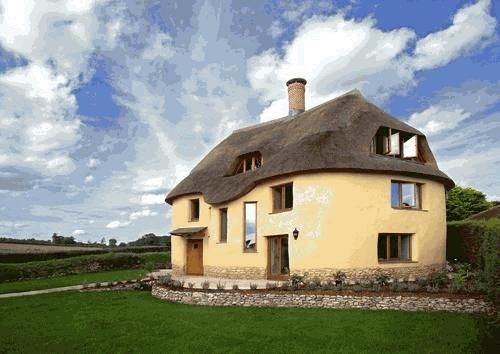
A modern cob house near Ottery St Mary, United Kingdom

From 2002 to 2004, sustainability enthusiast Rob Hopkins initiated the construction of a cob house for his family, the first new one in Ireland in circa one hundred years. It was a community project, but an unidentified arsonist destroyed it shortly before completion. The house, located at The Hollies Centre for Practical Sustainability in County Cork, was being rebuilt as of 2010. There are a number of other completed modern cob houses and more are planned, including a public education centre.

In 2000-01, a modern, four bedroom cob house in Worcestershire, England, UK, designed by Associated Architects, was sold for £999,000. Cobtun House was erected in 2001 and won the Royal Institute of British Architects' Sustainable Building of the Year award in 2005. The total construction cost was £300,000, but the metre (yard) thick outer cob wall cost only £20,000.

In the Pacific Northwest of the United States there has been a resurgence of cob construction, both as an alternative building practice and one desired for its form, function, and cost effectiveness. Pat Hennebery, Tracy Calvert, Elke Cole, and the Cobworks workshops erected more than ten cob houses in the Southern Gulf Islands of British Columbia, Canada.

In 2010, Sota Construction Services in Pittsburgh, Pennsylvania, United States, completed construction on its new 7,500 square foot corporate headquarters, which featured exterior cob walls along with other energy saving features like radiant heat flooring, a rooftop solar panel array, and daylighting. The cob walls, in conjunction with the other sustainable features, enabled the edifice to earn a LEED Platinum rating in 2012, and it also received one of the highest scores by percentage of total points earned in any LEED category.

In 2007, Ann and Gord Baird began constructing a two-storey cob house in Victoria, British Columbia, Canada, for an estimated $210,000 CDN. The home of 2,150 square feet includes heated floors, solar panels, and a southern exposure to enable passive solar heating.

Welsh architect Ianto Evans and researcher Linda Smiley refined the construction technique known as "Oregon Cob" in the 1980s and 1990s. Oregon Cob integrates the variation of wall layup technique which uses loaves of mud mixed with sand and straw with a rounded architectural stylism. They are experimenting with a mixture of cob and straw bale denominated "balecob".

== Cob building code ==
In 2019 an appendix for the International Residential Code (IRC) was approved by a vote in the public comment hearings. Appendix U of the IRC governs use of cob in load-bearing walls of single story residential structures. Based on currently available test data, the appendix limits the conditions under which cob may be used without engineering approval, such as seismic activity.

== See also ==
- Adobe – Building material of earth and organic materials
- Appropriate technology – Concept in the philosophy and politics of technology
- ARGE-SH, a German Research-Institute for Cob-buildings
- Chirpici – Earth blocks for construction (a variant of cob used in southern Romania)
- Composite material – Material made from a combination of two or more unlike substances, the earliest human-made composite materials were straw, combined with mud, to make bricks and walls.
- Compressed earth block – Building material
- Earth structure – Building or other structure made largely from soil
- Earthbag construction – Building method
- LOHAS – Demographic defining a particular market segment
- Mudbrick – Earth blocks for construction
- Rammed earth – Construction material of damp subsoil
- Rice-hull bagwall construction
- Sod – Upper layer of soil and grass
- Sod house – Turf house used in early colonial North America
- Straw-bale construction – Building method that uses bales of straw
- Superadobe – Form of earthbag construction
- Vernacular architecture – Architecture based on local needs, materials, traditions
- Woodway House – Historic house in Devon, England, a typical Devon cob building
