= Polite architecture =

Architectural concept

Polite architecture, or "the Polite" in architectural theory comprises buildings designed to include non-local styles for aesthetically pleasing decorative effect by professional architects. The term groups most named current architectural styles and can be used to describe many non-vernacular architectural styles. Irreconcilable architectural practices include Functionalism and Brutalism. Common styles often associated with polite architecture include Victorian, Gregorian, Gothic and Classical.

== Description ==
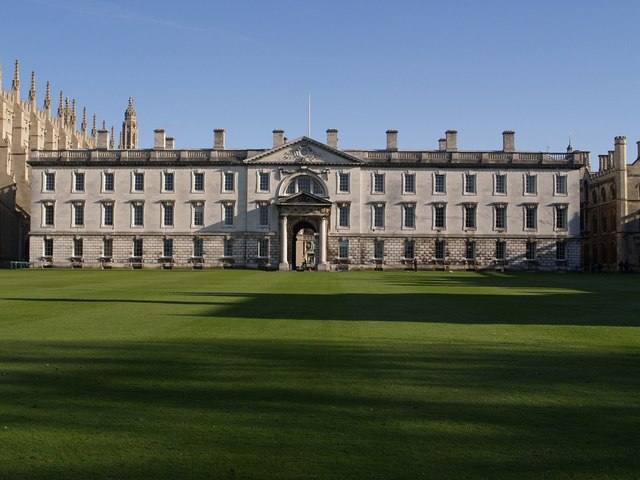
The Gibbs Building, King's College, Cambridge. An example of polite architecture, designed by a nationally famous architect (James Gibbs) in a 'correct' Palladian style derived from Italy, and constructed with Portland stone imported from hundreds of miles away.

Polite architecture is characterised by stylistic features which have been intentionally incorporated by an architect (or similarly academic or professional designer) for aesthetic effect. A building of polite design is conceived to make a stylistic statement which goes beyond its functional requirements. Its design is deferential to national or international architectural fashions, styles, and conventions; paying little or no regard to the conventional building practices and materials particular to a locality.

'The polite' is also a concept of architectural theory used to differentiate from 'the vernacular'. Polite architecture acts as a subcategory of architecture that focuses on the sides of architecture that reinforce the idea of architecture being an advanced, specialized field. Polite architecture places more emphasis on structures designed by those textually instructed architects, whereas, vernacular architecture typically are constructed through direct experiences and express local ideals and needs. In simpler terms, polite architecture refers to architectural designs that had a forethought styles.

== Architectural theory ==
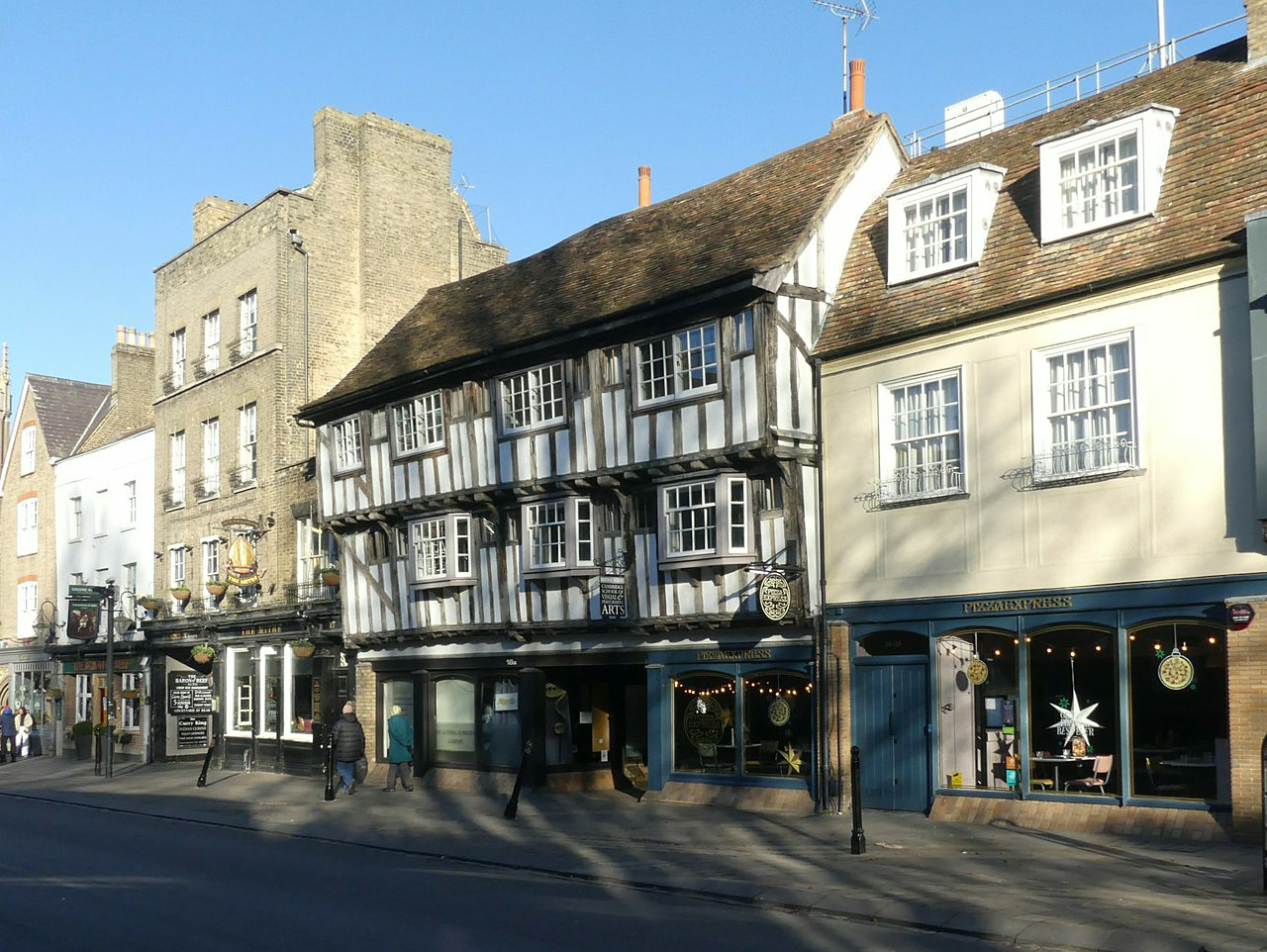
15-16 Bridge Street, Cambridge (centre). An example of vernacular architecture, constructed by an unknown craftsman following local precedents, in local timber.

The term is used by architectural historians to contrast with vernacular architecture, which refers to buildings which are constructed from materials and building conventions particular to their locality.

The architectural historian Ronald Brunskill has offered the following definition:

The ultimate in polite architecture will have been designed by a professional architect or one who has acted as such through some other title, such as surveyor or master mason; it will have been designed to follow a national or even an international fashion, style, or set of conventions, towards an aesthetically satisfying result; and aesthetic considerations will have dominated the designer's thought rather than functional demands.

As a theoretical term, the differences between "the polite" and "the vernacular" can be a matter of degree and subjective analysis. Between the extremes of the wholly vernacular and the completely polite, there are buildings which illustrate vernacular and polite content.

== The growth of polite architecture ==
Although originally only accessible to wealthy individuals and institutions, since the developed world's industrialisation buildings characterised by elements of 'the polite' have become prevalent throughout the building stock of developed countries. The rise in the number of buildings reflecting polite architectural features has been influenced by the expansion of the profession of architecture, the availability of more artistically amenable and often more resilient man-made building materials for most structural and decorative purposes, such as cement render, decorative bricks, plastics, glass and metals, and the availability of transport networks capable of delivering materials produced outside of a building's immediate locality. In 16th century England, towers and castles included both decorative and symbolic components. Such features were not only used in order to convey a grand, majestic appearance, but also were utilized as look out points. Additionally, courtyards were constructed in order to express the concept of community. Courtyards were positioned in the center where activities could be held. Other polite architectural features, such as height and lighting, were employed in order to create an aesthetic surrounding social class. Specific features that further expressed differences in social groupings included moats, gatehouses, emblems, and crenelations. The growth of these elements in the late 18th and 19th centuries, led to an expansion in the proportion of buildings which are of polite design, which may be as a result of aesthetic architects being demanded by choice or by economic convenience. Its growth has continued in the 20th and 21st centuries however has been nuanced by local policy and aesthetic demands to incorporate facets of architectural revivalism in many styles of architecture. With advancements in industrialization and materials, more emphasis could be placed on aesthetics and style.

== Sources and further reading ==
- Brunskill, R.W. (2000) [1971]. Illustrated Handbook of Vernacular Architecture (4th ed.). London: Faber and Faber. ISBN 0-571-19503-2.
- Fletcher, Banister (1996) [1896]. A History of Architecture. Oxford: Butterworth–Heinemann. ISBN 0-7506-2267-9.
- Pevsner, Nikolaus (1951) [2008]. The Buildings of England. Harmondsworth: Penguin Books.
- Watkin, David (2005) [1986]. A History of Western Architecture. London: Laurence King. ISBN 1-85669-459-3.
- Yarnwood, D. (1976). The Architecture of Britain. B.T. Batsford.
