= Wychert =

Building material of chalk, clay, and straw

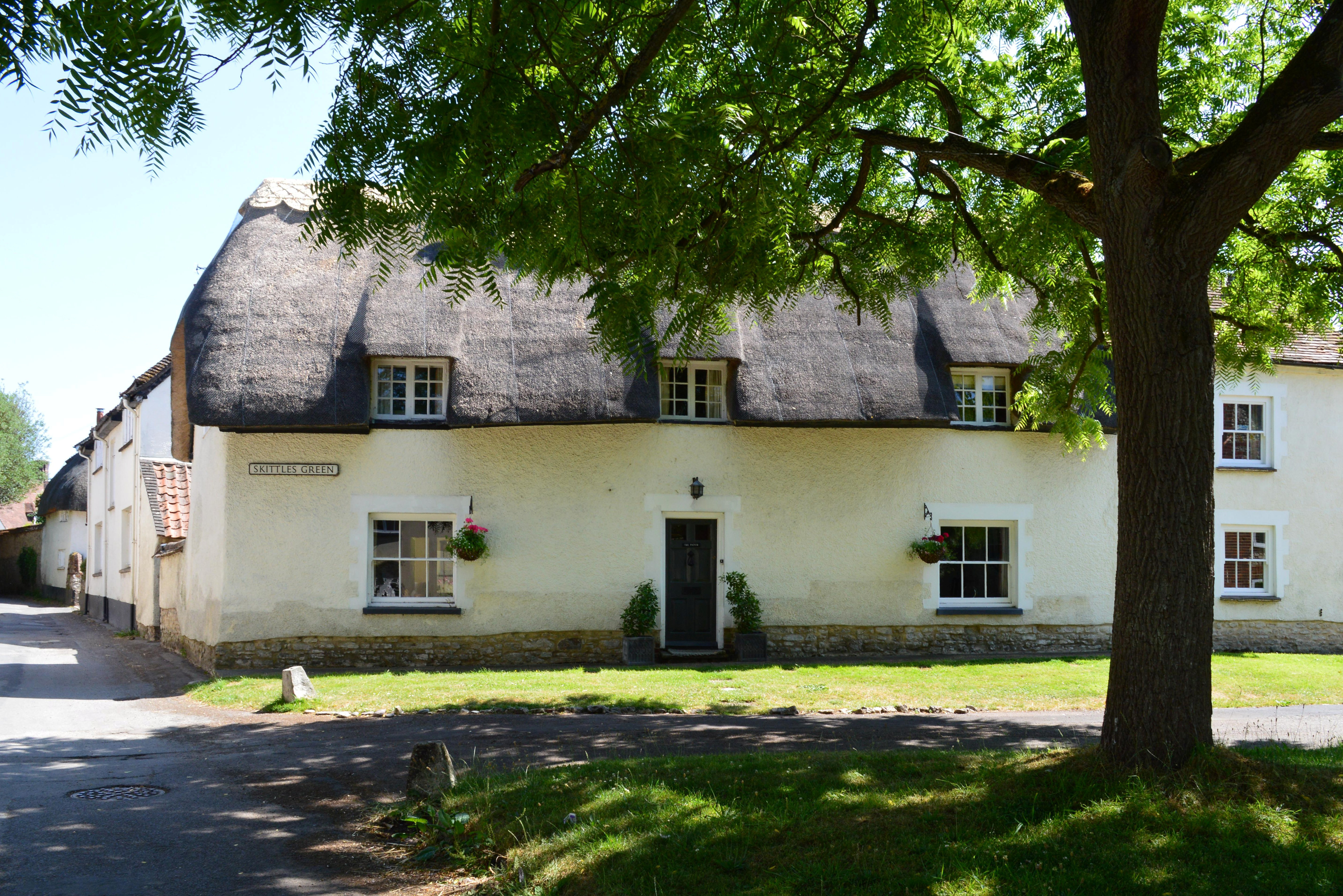
A wychert building in Haddenham

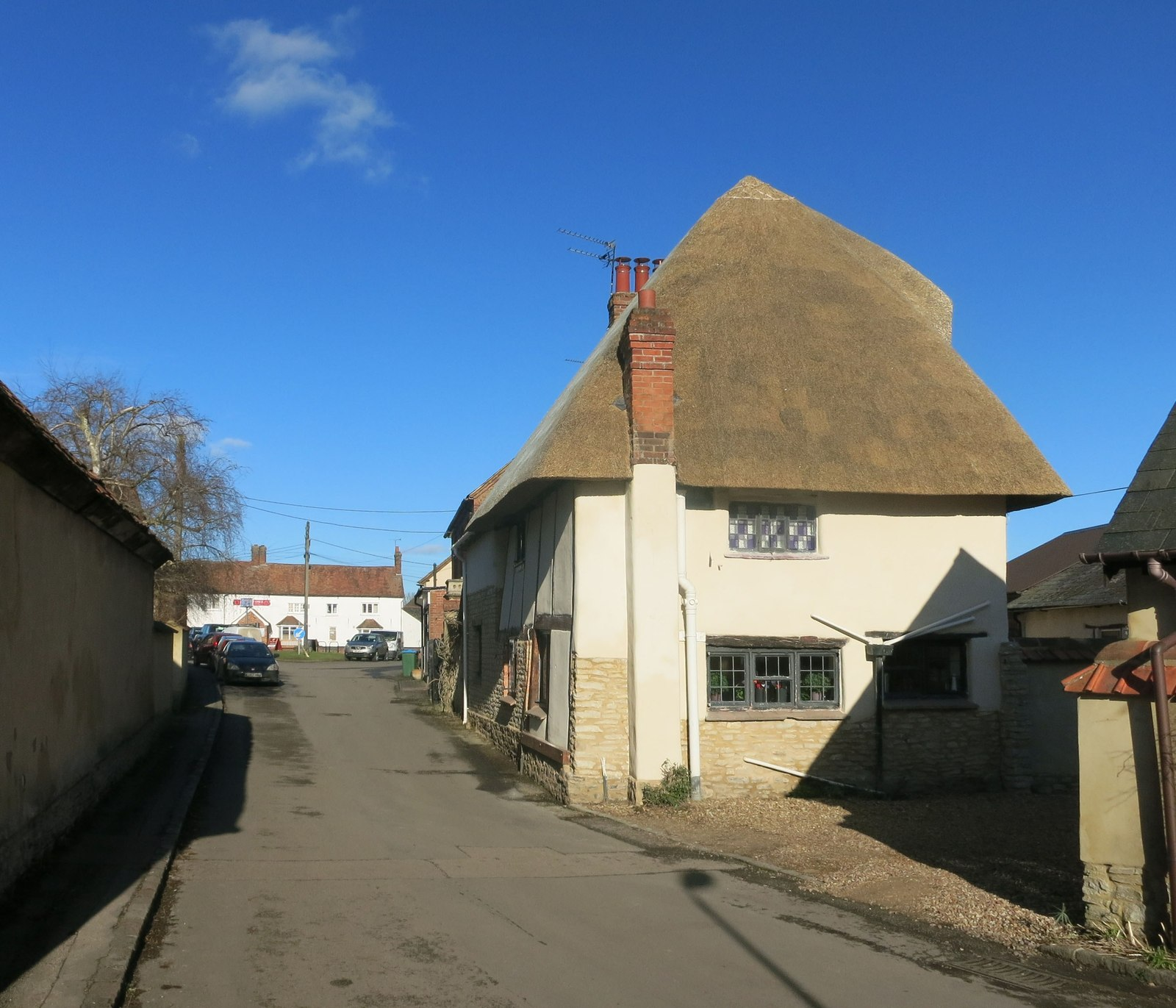
A white wall built with wychert, Haddenham

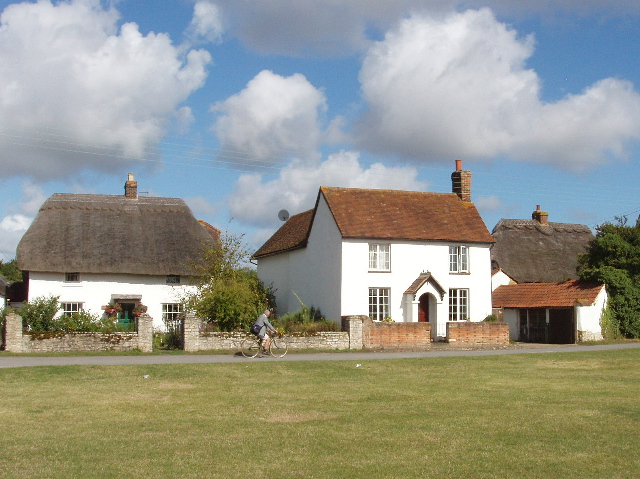
The 17th-century building on the left is built of wychert. 13 and 14, Townsend, Haddenham, Buckinghamshire.

Wychert or witchert (with a number of variant spellings existing and meaning "white earth") is a natural blend of white chalk and clay which is mixed with straw to make walls and buildings, usually then thatched or topped with red clay tiles.

This historic method of building construction is mainly localised to Haddenham and the surrounding local area in Buckinghamshire. Also found, amongst others, as a similar 'slow process' construction is a thatched example of 'mud wall' (made of Liassic subsoil) surrounding two sides of the churchyard at St Luke's Church, Laughton, Leicestershire. One of the largest known wychert structures is Haddenham Methodist Church.

The method of building with wychert is similar to that of a cob building. To maintain the rigid nature of wychert it must not become too dry for risk of crumbling, nor too wet for risk of turning to a slime. Keeping wychert well ventilated and not subject to excess condensation is therefore highly recommended. Any render applied to a wychert wall must therefore be of a breathable material — rendering wychert walls with a lime based render is therefore common practice.

A wychert house has been constructed at Chiltern Open Air Museum in Chalfont St Peter, Buckinghamshire.

== See also ==
- Vernacular architecture
