= List of hall houses in England =

List of hall houses in England is divided by the current ceremonial counties, rather than by historic counties, and listed in alphabetical order by county and then by name of the building. For Sussex, see either East Sussex or West Sussex; for Yorkshire see either East Riding of Yorkshire, North Yorkshire, South Yorkshire or West Yorkshire.

The hall house is a type of vernacular house traditional in many parts of England, Wales, Ireland and lowland Scotland, as well as northern Europe, during the Middle Ages, centring on a hall. Usually timber-framed, some high status examples were built in stone. Most, but not all, were built for domestic use.

Unaltered hall houses are almost unknown. Where they have survived, they have almost always been significantly changed and extended by successive owners over the generations. This list includes examples that have been significantly altered or added to, but that originated as hall houses or were hall houses in an early part of their history.

== Bedfordshire ==
- Moreteyne Manor (previously Moat Farmhouse), Marston Moreteyne.

== Berkshire ==
- Ockwells Manor, Cox Green.

== Buckinghamshire ==
- Dorney Court, Dorney.

== Cambridgeshire ==
- Rectory Farmhouse, Whaddon.

== Cheshire ==
- Bramall Hall, Bramhall.
- Hoole Hall.
- Little Moreton Hall, near Congleton.
- Willot Hall, Prestbury.

== City of London ==
- Crosby Hall, Kensington and Chelsea, London.

== Cornwall ==
- Cotehele, Calstock.
- Cullacott Farm, Werrington.

== Cumbria ==
- Smardale Hall, Smardale.

== Derbyshire ==
- Haddon Hall, Bakewell.
- The Old Manor, also known as Norbury Hall, Norbury.

== Devon ==
- Old Shute House, Shute.

== Dorset ==
- Athelhampton Hall, Athelhampton.

== Durham ==
- Crook Hall, Durham.

== East Riding of Yorkshire ==
- Burton Agnes Manor House, Burton Agnes.

== East Sussex ==
- Alfriston Clergy House, Alfriston.
- Anne of Cleves House, Lewes.
- Bridge Cottage, Uckfield.
- Stone Hill (formerly Stonehill Farmhouse), Chiddingly.

== Essex ==
- Horham Hall, Thaxted.
- The Monk's Barn, Newport.
- Paycocke's House, Coggeshall.

== Gloucestershire ==
- New Hall, Painswick.

== Greater London ==
- The Ancient House, Walthamstow.

== Greater Manchester ==
- Bedford Hall, Bedford, Leigh.

== Hampshire ==
- Hall House, Boarhunt (dismantled in 1970; reconstructed at the Weald and Downland Living Museum in West Sussex in 1981).
- Manor House Farmhouse, Farringdon.
- Medieval Merchant's House, Southampton.

== Herefordshire ==
- The Master's House, Ledbury.

== Hertfordshire ==
- Place House Hall, Ware.

== Kent ==
- Bayleaf Farmhouse, Chiddingstone (dismantled in 1968–1969; reconstructed at the Weald and Downland Living Museum in West Sussex in 1972).
- Great Dixter, Northiam. Great Dixter is a confection in three parts: the original hall house on the site dating from c. 1464–1479, another hall house brought from Benenden in Kent, and a 20th-century wing designed by Edwin Lutyens.
- Hole Cottage, near Cowden (owned by The Landmark Trust).
- Medieval house, North Cray (dismantled in 1965; reconstructed at the Weald and Downland Living Museum in West Sussex in 1984).
- Medieval house, Sole Street (dismantled in 1970; reconstructed at the Weald and Downland Living Museum in West Sussex in 1991 and 2016).
- The Old Bakery, Hamstreet.
- Pattyndenne Manor, Goudhurst.
- Penshurst Place, Penshurst.
- The Plough Inn, Stalisfield.
- Viney's Cottages, Leeds.

== Lancashire ==
- Rufford Old Hall, Rufford.

== Leicestershire ==
- Wygston's House, Leicester.

== Lincolnshire ==
- Gainsborough Old Hall, Gainsborough.

== Merseyside ==
- Speke Hall, Speke.

== Norfolk ==
- Bretts Manor, previously known as Wealden Hall House and the White Cottage, Wacton.

== North Yorkshire ==
- 1 Tanner Row, York.
- Markenfield Hall
- Wealden Hall, York.

== Northamptonshire ==
- Apethorpe Palace, Apethorpe.

== Northumberland ==
- Aydon Castle, Aydon.
- Featherstone Castle, near Haltwhistle. The Historic England listing states 'possibly an early C13 hall-house (now incorporated in west range).'

== Nottinghamshire ==
- The Old House, Bleasby.

== Oxfordshire ==
- Yelford Manor, Yelford.

== Rutland ==
- Quaintree Hall, Braunston-in-Rutland. The Historic England listing states 'The rear wing contains the remnants of an earlier timber hall: Crown post roof an unusual construction, upon base crucks, probably late C13.'

== Shropshire ==
- Stokesay Castle, Stokesay. Stokesay Castle is a fortified manor house, with a hall and solar (c. 1260–1280) which predate the licence to crenellate of 1291.

== Somerset ==
- Lytes Cary, near Charlton Mackrell.
- Whitestaunton Manor, Whitestaunton.

== South Yorkshire ==
- 41-43 Church Street, Barnsley. Initially a hall house, a cross-wing was added a few years later.

== Staffordshire ==
- 5, Brookside Road, formerly known as Wales End Farm, Barton-under-Needwood.
- Pear Tree Farmhouse, Yoxall.

== Suffolk ==
- Ancient House, Clare.
- Grundle House, Stanton.
- Little Hall, Lavenham.
- Ufford Hall, Fressingfield.

== Surrey ==
- Old Surrey Hall, Dormansland

== Tyne and Wear ==
- Washington Old Hall, Washington.

== Warwickshire ==
- The Cottage and Red Roof Farm, formerly known as Hall House, Sawbridge.

== West Midlands ==
- Bromwich Hall - The Manor House Museum, West Bromwich.
- New Hall Manor, Sutton Coldfield.

== West Sussex ==
NB The hall houses displayed at the Weald & Downland Open Air Museum are listed under their original counties.

- Ancient Priors, Crawley.
- The Old Punch Bowl, Crawley.
- Tree House, Crawley, now Crawley Museum.
- Walderton Cottage, Walderton (dismantled in 1980; reconstructed at the Weald and Downland Living Museum in West Sussex in 1982).
- The Yeoman's House, Bignor.

== West Yorkshire ==
- Calverley Old Hall, Leeds.
- Shibden Hall, Shibden.

== Wiltshire ==
- John Halle's Hall, Salisbury.
- King John's House, Tollard Royal.

== Worcestershire ==
- Eastington Hall, Longdon.
- Little Malvern Court, Little Malvern.
