= Whitestaunton Manor =

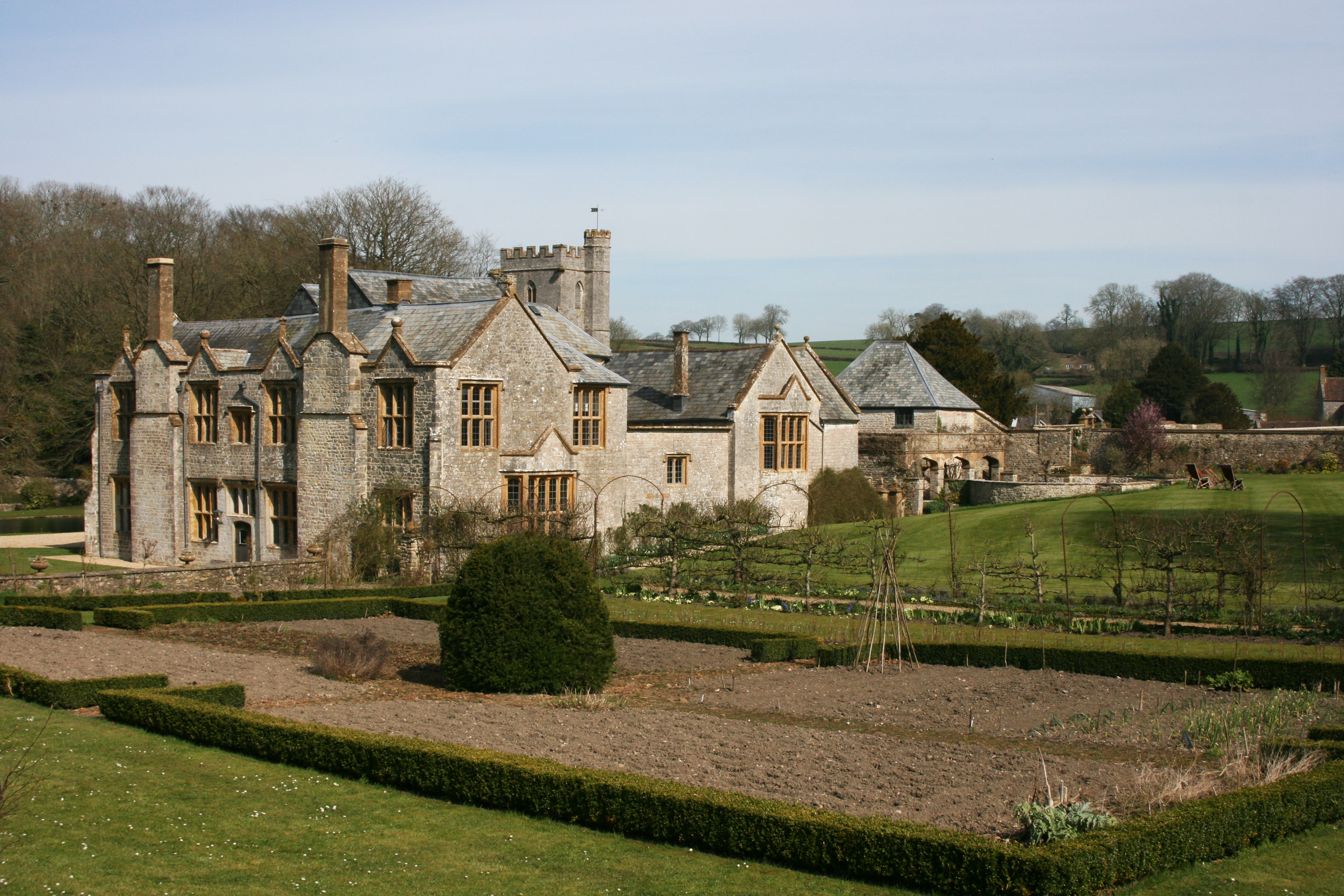

- Location within Somerset
- 50°53′24″N 3°01′28″W
- Location: Whitestaunton, Somerset, England

Listed Building – Grade I
- Designated: 4 February 1958
- Reference no.: 1250783

Whitestaunton Manor in the village of Whitestaunton, Somerset, England was built in the 15th century as a Hall house and has been designated as a Grade I listed building. It consists of an east–west range with two wings which were added later.

The first record of the house dates from 1479 with dendrochronology showing roof timbers dating from 1447 to 1492. It has been altered and expanded several times since, including a major expansion in the 1570s. The stables and coach house were built in the 16th century and are now Grade II listed.

Excavations carried out in 1882, when the house was owned by Charles Elton, had identified a building, thought to be a Roman villa, which had been incorporated into the grounds, and designated as a Scheduled monument. In 2003, archaeological television programme Time Team carried out an excavation in the grounds, which discovered a Roman bath house.

During restoration work, between 2000 and 2011, a Hammerbeam roof was discovered above a Georgian ceiling. The roof dated from 1446 to 1478. It had been damaged by Death watch beetle. The work received an award for the work from the Wood Awards in 2008. Wooden panelling had also been damaged by Death watch and Common furniture beetle. It was removed and restored.

== See also ==
- List of Grade I listed buildings in South Somerset
