= Weald and Downland Living Museum =

Open-air museum in West Sussex, England

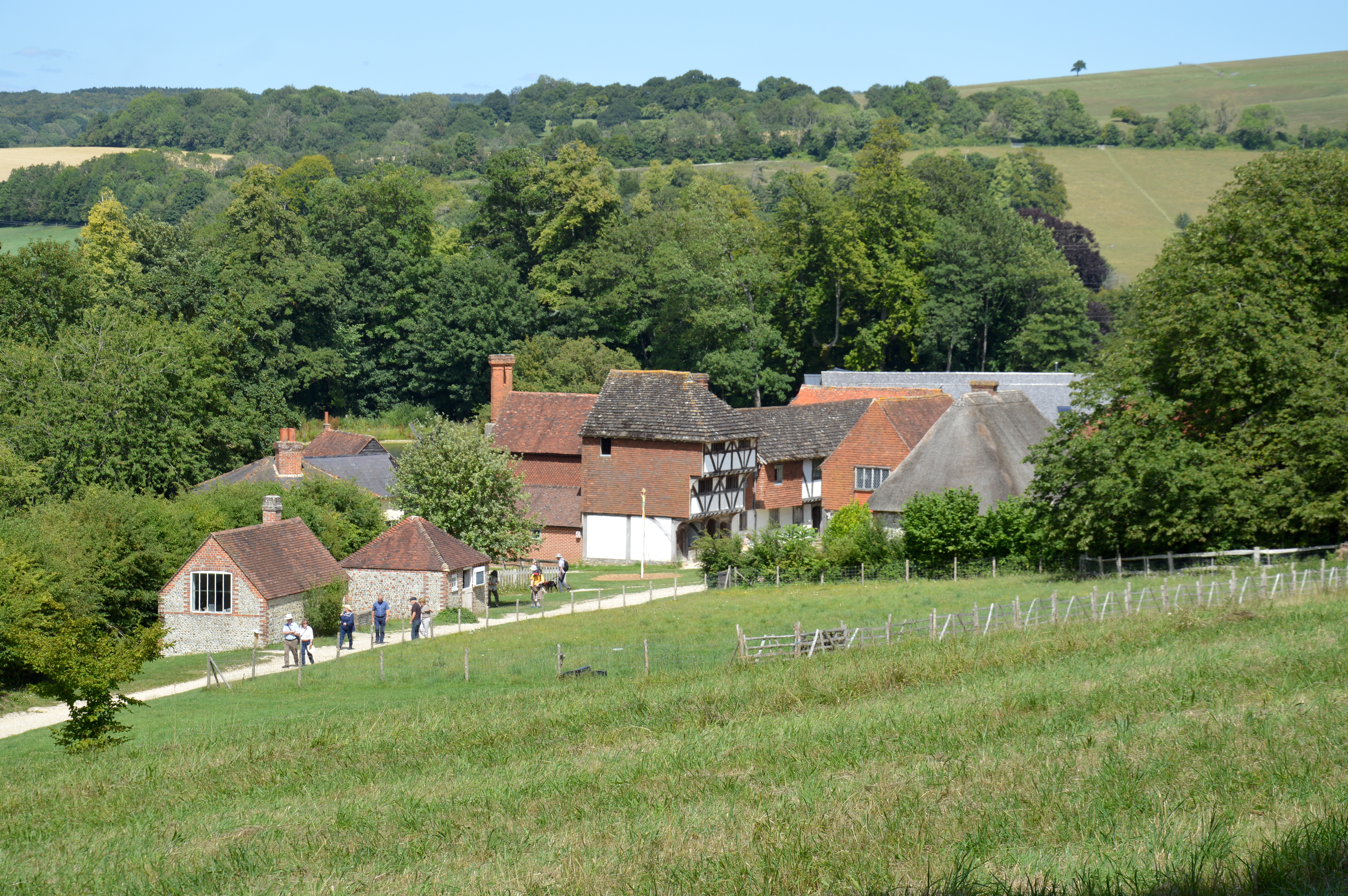
- A group of buildings at the museum's Market Square

- Location within West Sussex
- Established: 1970
- Location: Singleton, West Sussex
- Coordinates: 50°54′31″N 0°45′32″W
- Website: Official website

The Weald and Downland Living Museum (known as the Weald and Downland Open Air Museum until January 2017) is an open-air museum in Singleton, West Sussex. The museum is a registered charity. The museum covers 40 acres (16 ha), with over 50 historic buildings dating from 950AD to the 19th century, along with gardens, farm animals, walks and a mill pond.

The principal aim at the foundation of the museum was to establish a centre that could rescue representative examples of vernacular buildings from South East England, and thereby to generate increased public awareness and interest in the built environment. The museum principally promotes the retention of buildings on their original sites unless there is no alternative, and encourages an informed and sympathetic approach to their preservation and continuing use.

The buildings at the museum were all threatened with destruction and, as it was not possible to find a way to preserve them at their original sites, they were carefully dismantled, conserved and rebuilt in their historical form at the museum. These buildings, plus two archaeological reconstructions, help the museum bring to life the homes, farmsteads and rural industries of the last 950 years. Along with the buildings, there are "hands-on" activities, such as cooking, and weaving, and a number of yearly activities, including seasonal shows, historic gardens weekend and tree dressing.

== History ==
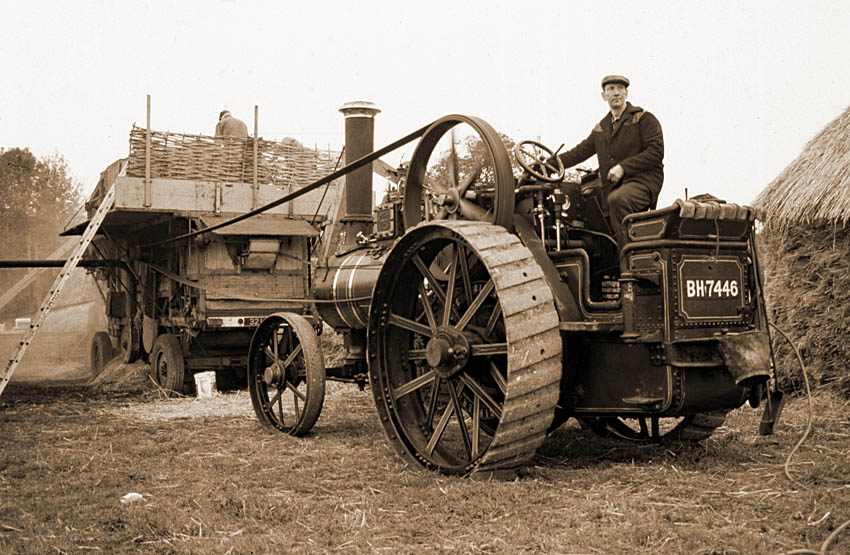
Traction engine driving the museum's Marshall threshing machine

The Weald and Downland Open Air Museum was launched in 1967 by a group of enthusiasts led by the museum's founder, the late Dr. J.R. Armstrong MBE. The land for the museum was provided by a local landowner, Edward James of West Dean at a peppercorn rent. The objective was to rescue vernacular buildings that would otherwise have been demolished. The museum first opened to the public on 5 September 1970.

The principle of an open-air museum was well established in Scandinavia as a way to create a three-dimensional setting for explaining the way of living or working. Open-air museums allowed the buildings to give context to the techniques, equipment, furnishings, clothes and art of the period.

== Buildings ==
=== Aisled Barn ===
The barn was originally built at Prior's Leaze Farm, Hambrook, Sussex, somewhere around 1771. It has a timber frame of oak and elm clad with weatherboards, and a roof thatched with reed. The most characteristic feature of the Hambrook barn is the aisle, which continues round the ends as well as the sides of the building. The eaves thus form a continuous line except for the high barn doors, which were needed on one side to allow loaded wagons to enter. The barn houses an exhibition showing traditional building materials and building methods, including displays on bricklaying, glass work, lead work, iron work, tiling and thatching. During the repair of the barn, the year 1771 was found scratched on an original rafter. The date was covered by a batten from the original thatched roof and probably records the date of construction of the building.

=== Barn from Cowfold ===
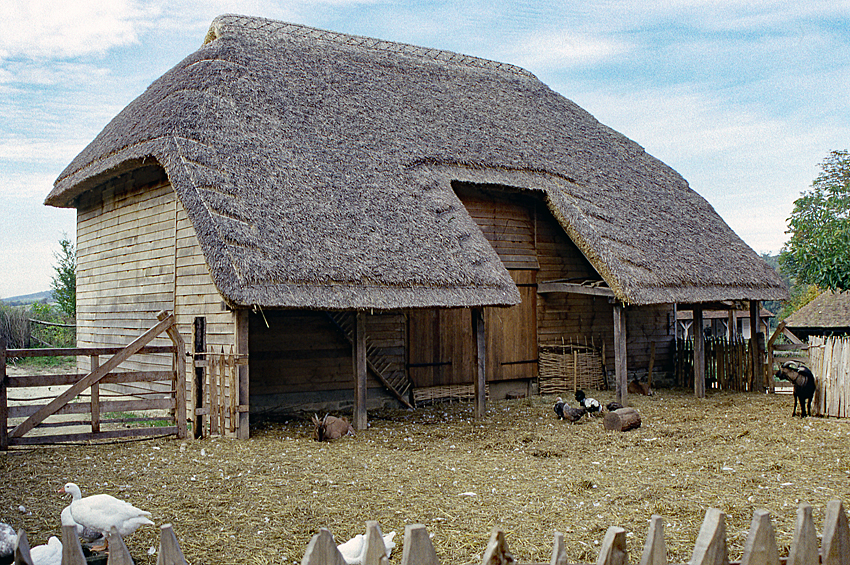
Medieval barn from Cowfold

This timber-framed barn dates from the 16th century and originally stood at Cowfold, Sussex, and is a typical late-medieval example from the Weald. The timbers have been analysed by dendrochronology (tree-ring dating) which revealed that they were felled in 1536, so the barn was probably built soon after this. In the museum, it is sited to form a farmstead with Bayleaf farmhouse.

=== Bayleaf farmhouse ===
The house being dismantled

Bayleaf farmhouse is a timber-framed Wealden hall house with a peg tile roof, dating from the early 15th century. The building has four rooms on the ground floor and two on the first floor. In the upper chamber, the windows in the solar have vertically sliding shutters, and there is even a garderobe. It was originally built at Ide Hill, Kent, and was donated to the museum in 1968 by the East Surrey Water Company, as the creation of Bough Beech Reservoir threatened its destruction. The building was dismantled in the winter of 1968–69.

=== Brick-drying shed ===
The brick-drying shed was originally located at the Causeway Brickworks, near Petersfield, Hampshire. It is 80 feet long, was built in 1733 and now houses an exhibition of traditional brickmaking. The Causeway Brickworks closed down early in the Second World War – in common with many others – because the glow from the open-top kiln was an obvious landmark for enemy aircraft. Another, more recent, drying shed from the same brickyard has been re-erected at the Amberley Working Museum.

=== Carpenter's shop ===
The carpenter's shop was originally built at Windlesham, Surrey, and dates from the late 19th or early 20th century. The building is constructed on a rough timber frame, with the main posts dug into the ground rather than being placed on a sole plate. The frame is boarded with vertical boards, the joints being closed by a cover strip, and the structure was protected by a coating of tar.

When the workshop was given to the museum it was still equipped with many of the tools and materials that had been used by the carpenter. The benches were in position and some of the tools were still on their racks or in their boxes.

=== Cattle sheds ===
Five open-fronted cattle sheds have been re-erected at the museum, which date from the 18th to 19th centuries.

The small, three-bay shed is from Lurgashall and is located near the Bayleaf farm house.

The seven-bay shed from Kirdford was originally joined at right angles to another of eight bays, together with a barn. It has been re-erected next to a shed from Goodwood, forming two sides of a yard.

The shed from Goodwood has a shepherd's room in one end, suggesting that the shed and the yard may have been used for sheep as well as cattle. This shed now contains a display of horse-drawn farm implements.

A shed from Rusper forms part of the museum's working-horse stables, and a shed from Coldwaltham is next to the charcoal burner's camp.

=== Charcoal burner's camp ===
The charcoal burner's camp was one of the original exhibits when the museum first opened to the public in 1970, and charcoal burning was the first rural trade to be demonstrated. The camp exhibit shows the process of making charcoal. The kiln had to be watched whilst the charcoal was being produced, so the burner lived on-site in a hut.

The camp was recently refurbished with the advice of retired charcoal burners who had used traditional earth-covered clamps until 1948.

=== Court barn ===
Court barn dates from the late 17th or early 18th century. It was originally built at Lee-on-Solent, Hampshire. It had the normal arrangement of a central threshing floor between the storage bays and there is an owl loft above the entrance. The building houses an exhibition on the use of lead in buildings and plumbing, stonemasonry and stained glass work. The barn was dismantled in 1976 and re-erected at the museum in 1980. The work was funded by the Worshipful Company of Plumbers. The BBC TV series The Repair Shop has been largely filmed in the barn since 2017.

=== Crane ===
The crane was made by John Smith Ltd of Keighley, Yorkshire, in 1900 and was originally installed at a farm in Alton, Hampshire. It is rated at 5 tons capacity and is worked by hand. It forms part of a reconstructed timber yard.

=== Granary ===
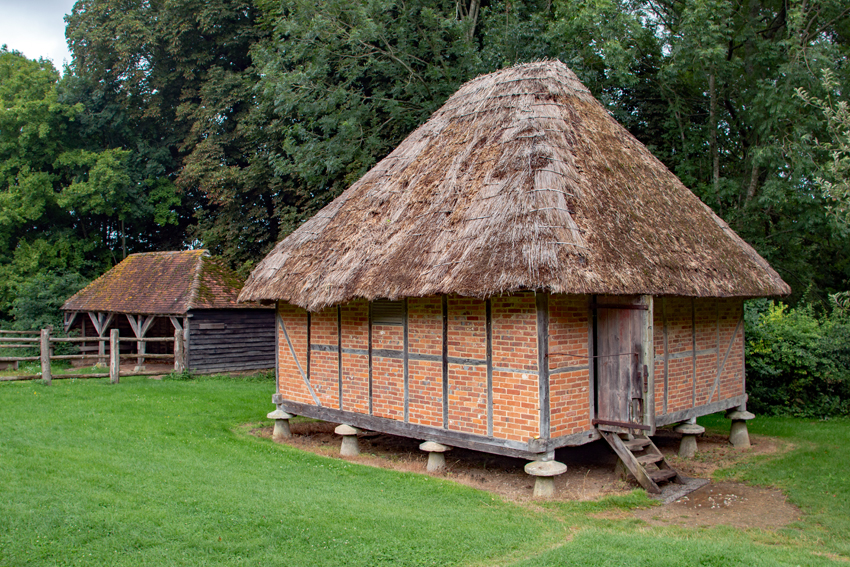
Littlehampton granary & Charlwood shed

The granary was built in 1731 at West Ashling, Sussex. It has a timber frame filled with bricks, and a thatched roof. The building measures 20 feet (6.10 m) square, which makes it one of the larger granaries. It is built on sixteen staddle stones as an anti-vermin measure.

=== Gridshell ===
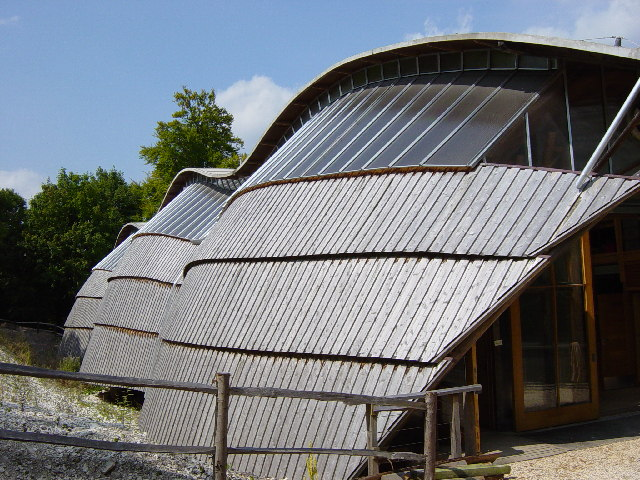
The Gridshell building

The Weald and Downland Gridshell was constructed in 2000–2002. An innovative design built primarily to create an accessible store for the museum's rural life collection, it also houses the museum's conservation workshops, and an exhibition area is in the foyer. The building has won eight awards, and was runner-up for the RIBA 2003 Stirling Prize.

=== Hall ===
The derelict house in 1971. The portion saved is on the right of the picture.

This medieval hall house was originally built at Boarhunt, Hampshire, in the 15th century. It is of cruck frame construction, with brick walls and a thatched roof. The building was rescued in 1971. Photographs show that the house was extended to about double its original size but only the medieval section of the house was dismantled and re-erected at the museum. The hall is about 17 feet (5.18 m) square in plan, with a service room at one end. The other end of the original building was lost due to various extensions and alterations over the centuries. The reconstructed building contains about 30% of the original timbers, which would normally prevent its reconstruction. An exception has been made in this case as the surviving original timbers are well distributed, and because of its unique cruck frame construction.

=== Hangleton Cottage ===
A small flint-built thatched medieval cottage modelled on two excavated dwellings at the deserted medieval village of Hangleton, Hove. The Ministry of Public Building and Works undertook an archaeological dig between 1952 and 1954 and uncovered eight 13th and 14th-century buildings. Hangleton cottage represents a typical peasant dwelling of the period based on archeological evidence of these excavations, with a main room with an open hearth and an inner room with an oven. Hangleton declined during the agricultural crisis of 1315 to 1322 and then the Black Death of 1348, so that by 1428 there were only two dwellings on the site. The DMV was excavated owing to post-WW2 suburban expansion of Hove.

=== Horse Whim ===
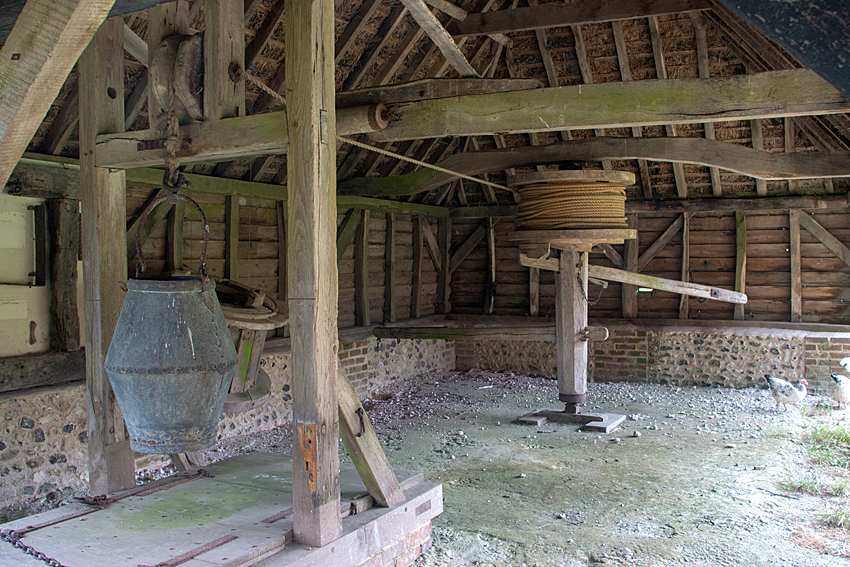
West Kingsdown horse whim

The horse whim is housed in an open-fronted thatched shed that was originally at Charlwood, Surrey. It was used to raise water from a well. The horse whim was originally built at West Kingsdown, Kent. It was rescued by the museum in 1980 and re-erected in 2000.

=== House, Lavant ===
This house dates from the 17th century. It originally stood at Lavant, West Sussex. Externally it has been restored to its 17th-century appearance, but it has a modern interior. The building is used as an education room for school and youth visits to the museum.

=== House, Walderton ===
This house was originally built at Walderton, Sussex. It has a timber frame dating from the 15th century, with flint external walls added in the 17th century. It has a thatched roof.

=== House extension ===
This building was the rear extension of a house in Reigate, Surrey, added in the 17th century. It has two carved fireplaces and there are the remains of wall paintings. This building is not currently open to the public.

=== Joinery shop ===
The joinery shop was originally built at Witley, Surrey, and dates from the late 19th or early 20th century. It houses an exhibition on building construction.

=== Longport Farmhouse ===
The Longport Farmhouse is a typical Kent farmhouse and was formerly located at Folkestone, Kent, but was threatened by the construction of the Channel Tunnel. The earliest part of the building dates from 1554 and was originally attached to a medieval hall, which no longer exists. From the late 16th century through to the early 20th century various extensions and alterations were made. The farmhouse was dismantled in 1992 by a team from the museum and the Canterbury Archaeological Trust and reconstructed in 1995. During the reconstruction the museum tried to reconstruct faithfully the historic building as it came into the 20th century, with all its phases of alteration. However, the 17th-century chimney stack was not reconstructed, but was dismantled and recorded in such a way that it could be reconstructed in the future. In leaving it out the museum created an open space in the building to allow it to serve as the entrance and shop, and to better demonstrate the historic development of the farmhouse. The farmhouse also serves as offices for the museum.

=== Market Hall ===
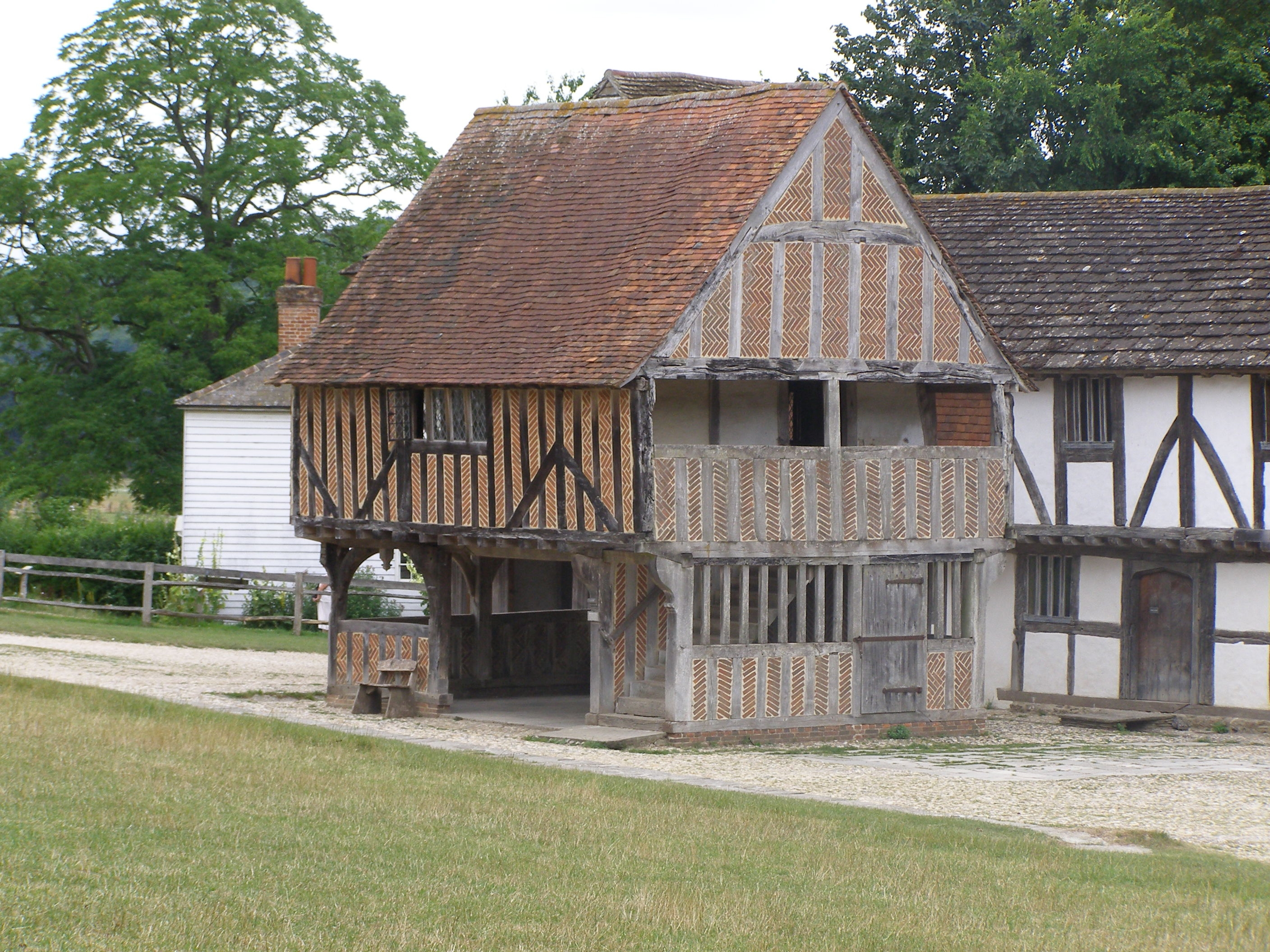
The Market Hall

The Market Hall dates from the 17th century and was originally built at Titchfield, Hampshire. It has a lock-up on the ground floor and the first-floor room served as the town council chamber. When the Market Hall was dismantled and re-erected at the museum, it was the second time that had happened. The building had been moved from its original location in the centre of Titchfield to another site in the town in the mid-19th century.

=== Medieval house, North Cray ===
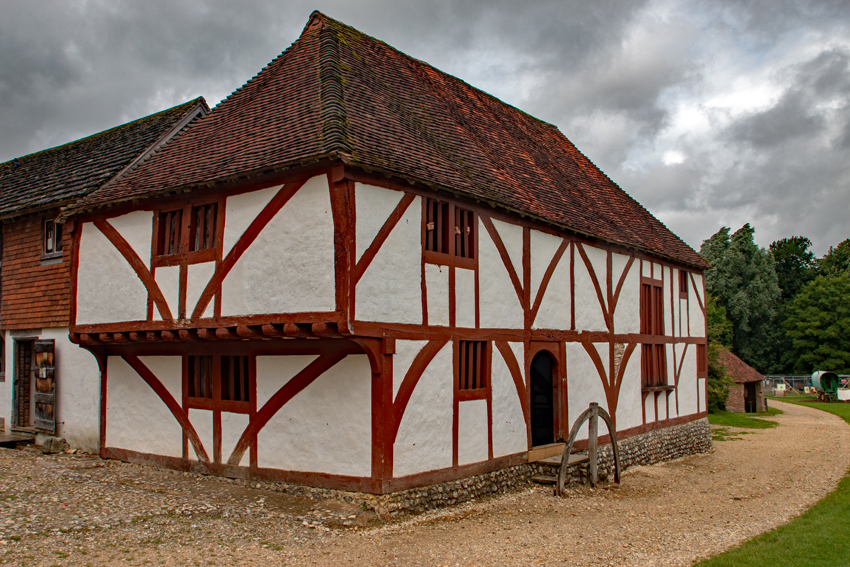
North Cray medieval house

This medieval hall house was originally built at North Cray, Kent, probably in the 15th century. It is timber-framed with a peg tile roof. The external timbers, which are elm rather than the more usual oak, are painted red as there is evidence that this was done originally.

=== Medieval house, Sole Street ===
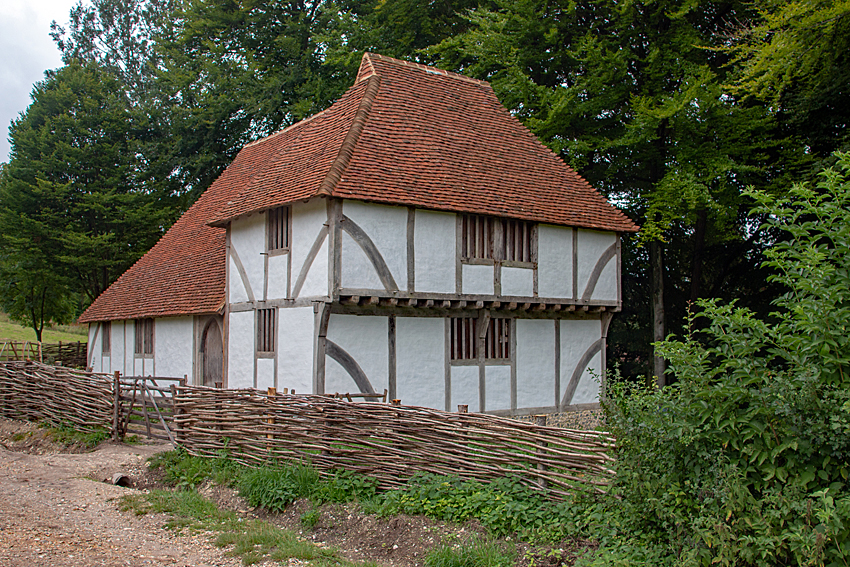
Sole Street medieval hall house

This medieval hall house was originally built at Sole Street, Kent. It has a timber frame and peg tile roof. The building is now used as a craft demonstration area, allowing visitors to get a hands-on experience.

=== Medieval shops ===
This building dates from the 15th century and houses a pair of shops. It was originally built at Horsham, Sussex. The three-story building has jettied upper floors. It is timber-framed with a peg tile roof and peg tiles to the upper floors on at least one side. The upper floors serve as the museum's library and are not normally open to the public.

=== Open shed ===
The open shed dates from the 18th century. It was originally built at Charlwood, Surrey. It served as a cart shed and also a saw shed. The shed was dismantled in 1999, the work being partly funded by the British Airports Authority. When it was reconstructed at the museum in 2000, the horse whim from West Kingsdown, Kent, was installed.

=== Pendean farmhouse ===
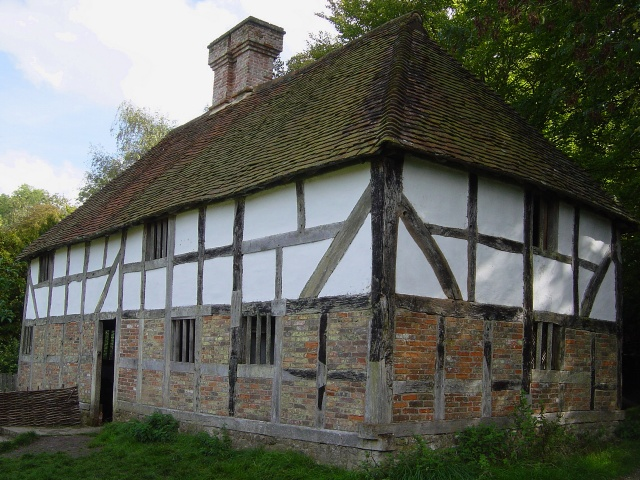
Pendean farmhouse

This hall house was originally built at West Lavington, West Sussex, in 1609. Instead of an open hall there is a central chimney with fireplaces on both ground and first floors. It retains some features from 16th-century practice, such as unglazed windows. The building has a timber frame, with brick infill to the ground floor and wattle and daub infill to the first floor. It was re-erected at the museum in 1975, but the discovery of a postcard of the building at its original site showed that the chimney had not been reconstructed correctly. The chimney was rebuilt in January 2001 to a more accurate profile. The house is furnished in period style.

=== Poplar cottage ===
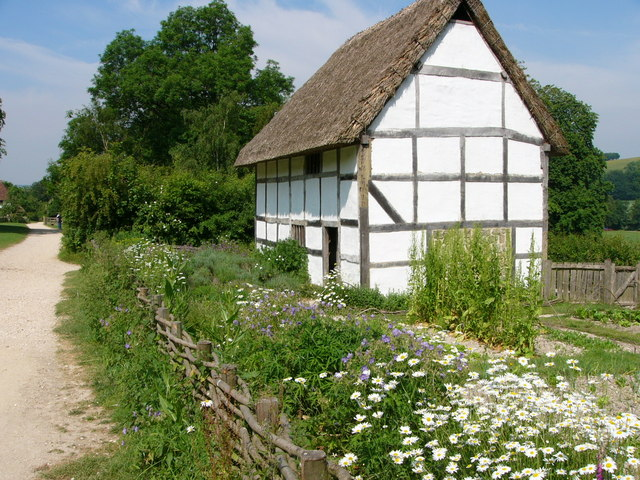
Poplar Cottage

Poplar cottage is a small timber-framed, thatched building dating from the 17th century. It was originally built at Washington, Sussex. The building dates from between 1550 and 1630. It was donated to the museum in 1982 and carefully dismantled in that year. It was re-erected in 1999, the work being funded by a grant from the Heritage Lottery Fund.

Rebuilding

Work on re-erecting the building began on 10 April 1999, the timbers having been prepared over the previous winter. The outside wall of the smoke bay was infilled with sandstone, whilst the rest of the building was infilled with wattle and daub. The roof was thatched.

=== Plumber's workshop ===
The plumber's workshop dates from the late 19th century and was originally built at Newick, Sussex. The upper floor served as a glazier's workshop.

=== Pugmill house ===
This brick and stone building originally stood at Redford, Sussex. It housed a horse-powered pug mill, which was used to prepare clay for brickmaking.

=== Saw-pit shed ===
This 19th-century shed was originally built at Sheffield Park, Sussex. It houses a range of tools used in the conversion of trees to finished timber.

=== School ===
This building dates from the 19th century, and was used as a school for educating poor children in the early part of that century. It was originally built at West Wittering and is of brick and flint construction with a tiled roof.

=== Stable ===
The stable dates from the mid-18th century and was originally built at Watersfield, Sussex. It is timber-framed, clad in weatherboarding and has a peg tile roof. The building can house up to five horses or oxen.

=== Shelter shed ===
The open-fronted shelter shed was originally built at Coldwaltham, West Sussex.

=== Smithy ===
The smithy was built in the mid-19th century. It was originally at Southwater, Sussex.

=== Treadwheel ===
The treadwheel dates from the early 17th century. It was probably not worked by a horse due to its size. The treadwheel is housed in a small timber-framed building with a thatched roof and was originally built at Catherington, Hampshire.

=== Tindalls Cottage ===
Tindalls Cottage, dating from around 1700–1725, is an oak-framed building with a tiled roof and gable-end chimney, originally from Ticehurst, East Sussex. It was dismantled in 1974 before the cronstruction of the Bewl Water reservoir. The name of the cottage is derived from the family occupying the house from 1748 to 1806.

=== Toll cottage ===
The toll cottage is typical of those of the 18th and 19th centuries. It originally stood on a road built in 1807 at Upper Beeding, Sussex. It has been set up with a recreated tollgate and milestone.

=== Upper Hall ===
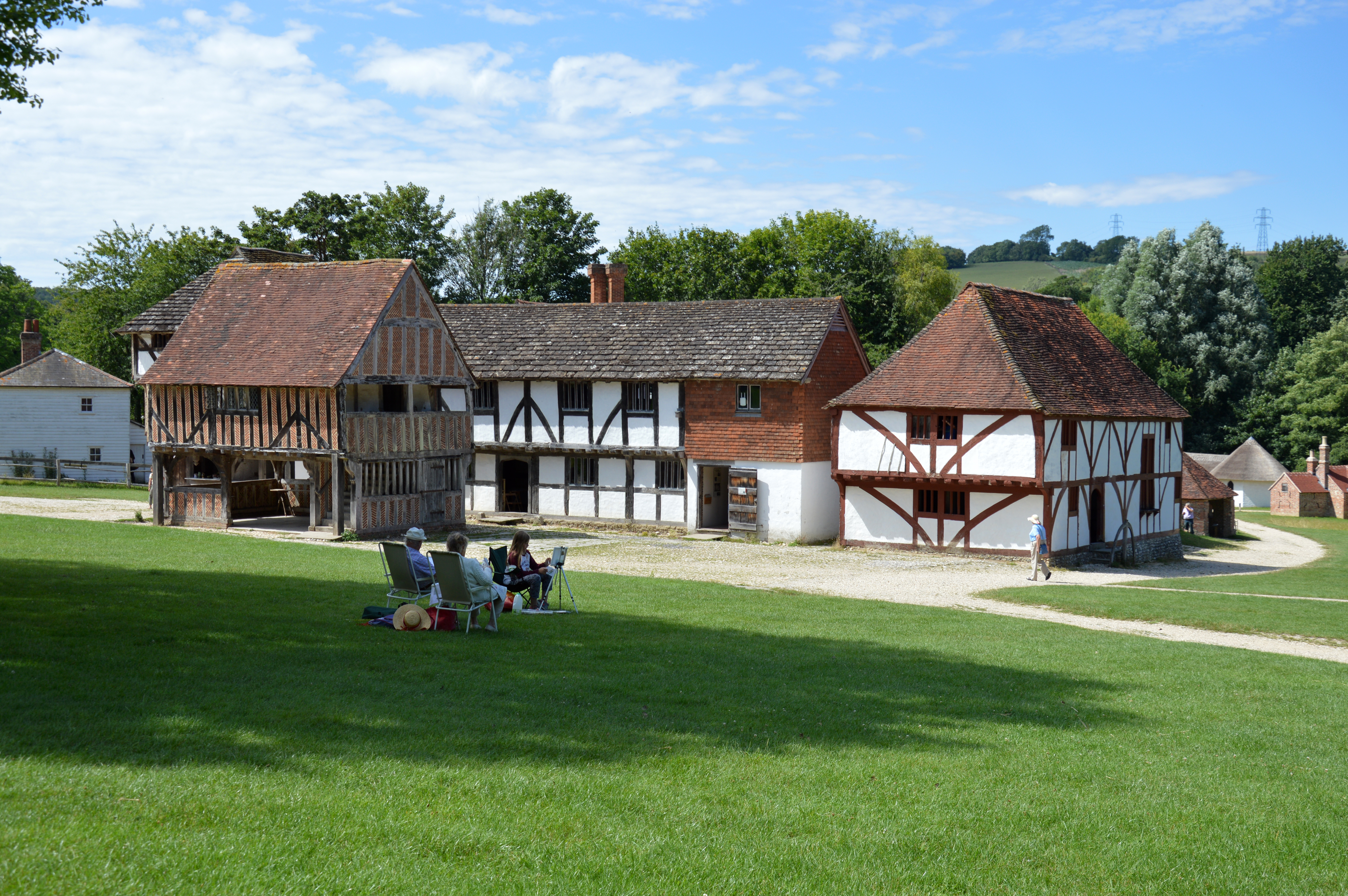
The Upper Hall from Crawley, in front of which stands the Market Hall.

This building dates from the 15th century and has a long, open room on the first floor, which probably served as a communal meeting place. It was originally built at Crawley, Sussex, behind Tree House—the old manor house of Crawley. The building was threatened with demolition due to an extension to an office building. Of the original four bays, two complete bays remained, plus a third of another. The original building would have been some 36 feet (10.97 m) long. The original roof covering would have been Horsham Slab, which was replaced when the building was re-erected at the museum. Only the centre part of the present building is the original. The ends are modern reconstructions replicating contemporary practice. The building is used as the museum's library and meeting place and is not normally open to the public. The Worshipful Company of Drapers donated £5,000, which was used to part-fund the dismantling and re-erection of the building at the museum.

=== Wagon shed ===
The wagon shed dates from the 18th century. It was originally built at Wiston, Sussex.

=== Watermill ===
17th-century water mill
The sounds of the mechanism grinding flour.

The watermill dates from the early 17th century, and was working until 1935. It is in working order, and flour from the mill is sold in the museum shop. The mill was originally built at Lurgashall, Sussex, to serve Petworth House and Park. At one time it may have been used in the grinding of bark for use in the tanning process. In 1968, the derelict mill was damaged by floods, causing the millstones to fall through the rotting floors.

The mill was originally powered by a tributary of the River Rother. At one time the mill had two waterwheels, each working two pairs of millstones. The 12 feet (3.66 m) diameter overshot waterwheel, which was originally cast at Cocking Foundry for Coster's Mill, West Lavington, drives the two pairs of millstone, a sack hoist and flour dresser. The machinery in the mill was installed in 1911. The mill was donated to the museum in 1973 and carefully dismantled, at which time evidence was found of a previous use of the site as a Hammer mill. Re-erection and restoration of the machinery took seven years.

=== Whittaker's cottages ===
Whittaker's cottages are a pair of timber-built cottages under a slate roof. They were originally built at Ashtead, Surrey. One cottage is furnished in 19th-century style and the other is unfurnished to better show its construction.

=== Windpump ===
Westham windpump
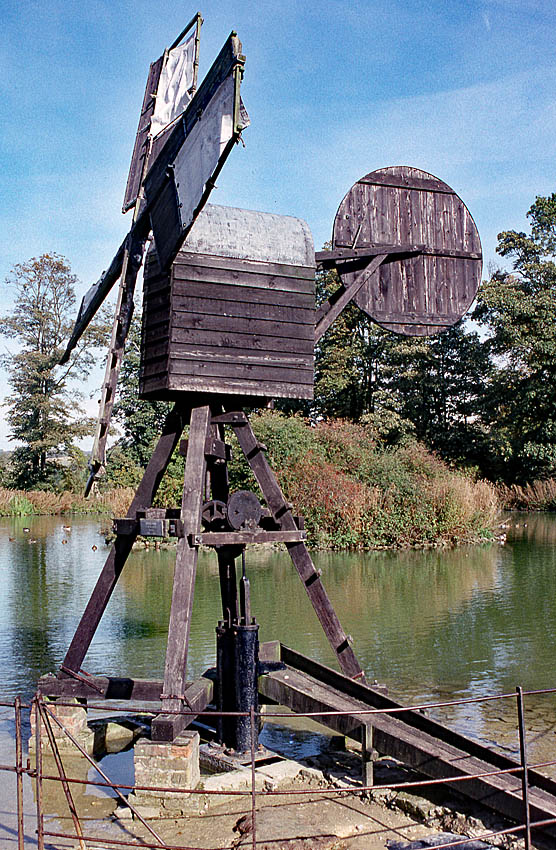
- Interactive map of Westham windpump

Origin
- Grid reference: SU 8744 1285
- Coordinates: 50.908°N 0.758°W
- Operators: Weald and Downland Open Air Museum
- Year built: Mid-19th century

Information
- Purpose: Pumping water
- Type: Hollow post mill
- No. of sails: Four
- Type of sails: Boarded sails
- Winding: Windvane
- Type of pump: Plunger pump

The windpump is a hollow post mill that was built in the mid-19th century. It was originally at Westham, Sussex (grid reference TQ 640 043), and was marked on an 1860 map. The windpump was re-erected at the museum in 1975.

=== Winkhurst kitchen ===
This 16th-century building was originally part of a larger building at Sundridge, Kent. It is timber-framed with a crown-post roof. The building dates from between 1492 and 1537. It was the first building acquired by the museum. Dismantled in 1968, it was re-erected at the museum at a site that later proved to be unsuitable. Therefore, it was decided that the building should again be dismantled and re-erected at another site within the museum, with modern extensions designed to allow the building to be better interpreted by visitors. The building was dismantled in December 2001 and reconstructed for the second time between February and May 2002. The interior of the building has been re-created as a working Tudor kitchen.

== Animals ==
The museum has a selection of typical farm animals, including Southdown sheep, Sussex chickens and Embden geese. Sussex Saddlebacks has loaned the museum some rare saddleback pigs. In addition the museum has some Percheron horses to pull the various horse-drawn vehicles and implements.

== Awards ==
Since its inception, the museum has won a host of awards and accolades for its work and designated collection.

2018 – Public and Community Award, Sussex Heritage Trust. For the museum's Gateway Project (visitor centre) This award celebrates restoration or new projects, which provide or improves facilities for the community.

2017 – Sandford Award for Education, Heritage Education Trust

2016 – Queen's Award for Voluntary Service. For the museum's volunteers who work in the community to stimulate public interest in historical crafts and rural buildings. The highest award a voluntary group can receive in the UK.

2015 – Balfour of Burleigh Tercentenary Prize. For Roger Champion, Museum Master Carpenter for exceptional achievement in crafts.

2015 – Sussex Visitor Attraction of the Year

2015 – Sussex Heritage Person of the Year, Sussex Heritage Trust. Awarded to Richard Pailthorpe, Museum Director

2012 – Sussex Heritage Person of the Year, Sussex Heritage Trust. Awarded to Roger Champion, Museum Master Carpenter

2011 – Europa Nostra Award. The museum received a European Union Prize for Cultural Heritage/Europa Nostra Award for Historic Building Conservation Training Programme, plus Grand Prix Laureate in recognition of outstanding heritage achievements.

2001 – Sandford Award for Education, Heritage Education Trust

1998 – Designated Outstanding Collection. Government designation was awarded to the museum's entire collection. This is awarded to pre-eminent collections of national (and sometimes international) importance.

1997 – Sandford Award for Education, Heritage Education Trust

1989 – Times/Shell Community Museum Award. Voted for by the public and presented by the Duchess of York, for the museum's enormous support from the local community.

1975 – National Heritage Museum of the Year Award. One of the first independent museums to receive this award, which is now known as the Art Fund Prize for Museum of the Year).

== Filming location ==
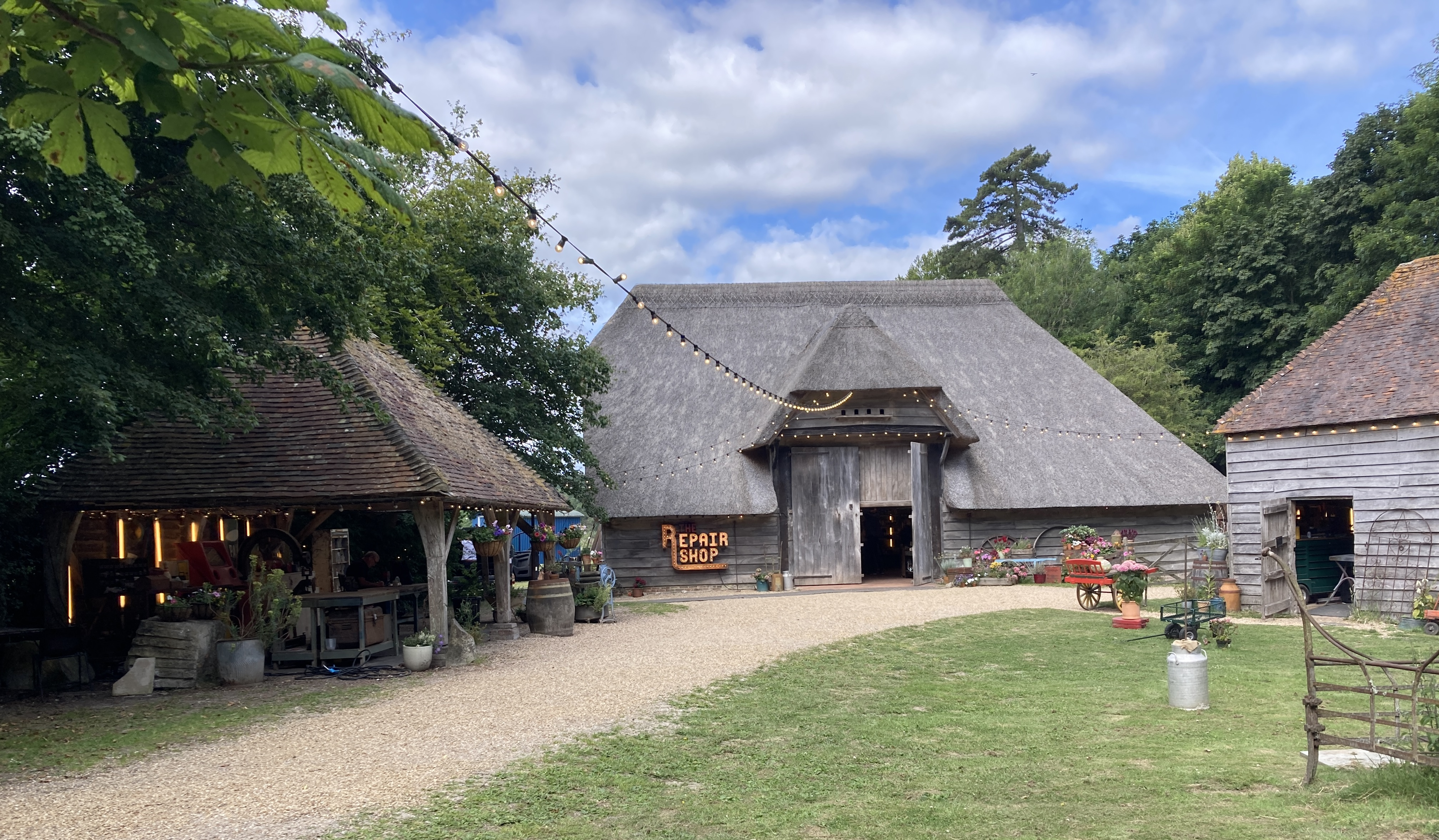
The barn at the Weald and Downland Living Museum used for filming the BBC series The Repair Shop – seen in 2024

The museum has been used for authentic historic interiors and exteriors, plus general landscape views.

Past productions filmed at the museum include:

- Amazon Prime Video Good Omens (October 2017)
- BBC1/BBC2 The Repair Shop (May 2017–present)
- CBeebies My Story Specials: Great Fire of London (October 2016)
- Wall to Wall (for BBC2) Victorian Bakers (January 2016)
- BBC Films & Koch Media Bill (September 2015)
- BBC Countryfile (September 2015)
- BBC The Hollow Crown Henry VI part II (January 2015)
- Freemantlemedia Ltd Escape to the Country (October 2013)
- Lion TV Tudor Monastery Farm (April – October 2013)
- BBC Flog It! (February 2013)
- 360 Productions Ltd The Time Travellers Guide to the Elizabethans (November 2012)
- BBC Hairy Bikers (September 2012)
- STV Productions Celebrity Antiques Road Trip (June 2012)
- Silver River Restoration Women (April 2012)
- Shakespeare Productions Ltd Henry VI parts (January 2012)
- Lion TV The Link (August 2011)
- BBC The One Show with Ruth Goodman (January – February 2011)
- Endemol Restoration Village – The Final (September 2010)
- BBC If Walls Could Talk with Lucy Worsley (September 2009 & February 2010)
- Endemol for the BBC Restoration Village – The Final (September 2009)
- Talkback Thames Escape to the Country (July 2009)
- Antix Productions Most Haunted (May 2009)
- BBC Countryfile featuring the museum's Tree Dressing Event (Dec 2008)
- Maya Vision Int Christine of Codicote (March 2008 & Oct 2009)
- Hallmark Entertainment The 10th Kingdom (2000)
- BBC Tweenies (4 September 1999, Old House episode only)

== See also ==
- Tudor Monastery Farm
- Acton Scott Historic Working Farm, Shropshire
- Blists Hill Victorian Town
- Beamish Museum
- Morwellham Quay
- Manor Farm, River Hamble Country Park
- Butser Ancient Farm
- Castell Henllys
- St Fagans National Museum of History
- Highland Folk Museum
- Black Country Museum
