= Aydon =

Village in Northumberland, England

Coordinates: 54.988°N 1.988°W

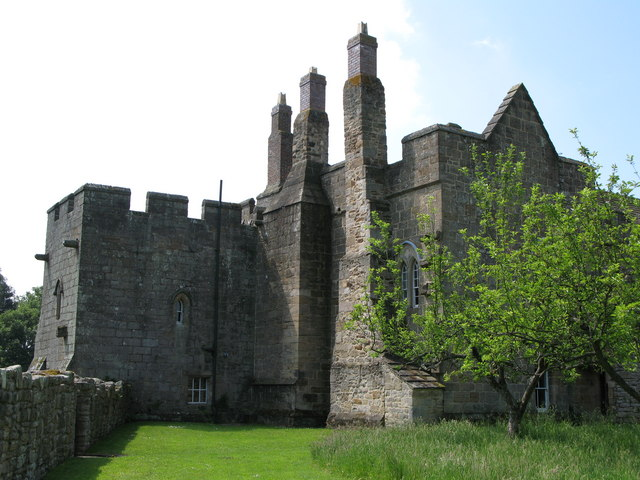
- Aydon Castle

- Location within Northumberland
- OS grid reference: NZ008660
- Civil parish: Corbridge
- Unitary authority: Northumberland
- Ceremonial county: Northumberland
- Region: North East
- Country: England
- Sovereign state: United Kingdom
- Post town: CORBRIDGE
- Postcode district: NE45
- Dialling code: 01434
- Police: Northumbria
- Fire: Northumberland
- Ambulance: North East
- UK Parliament: Hexham

Aydon is a village and former civil parish, now in the parish of Corbridge, in Northumberland, England. It is about 2 miles (3 km) northeast of Corbridge on the B6321 road. The village is about 18 miles (29 km) from Newcastle upon Tyne along the main A69 road. The A68 road is close by, leading to Jedburgh and Darlington. Aydon lies near the course of the ancient Roman monument, Hadrian's Wall. In 1951 the parish had a population of 90.

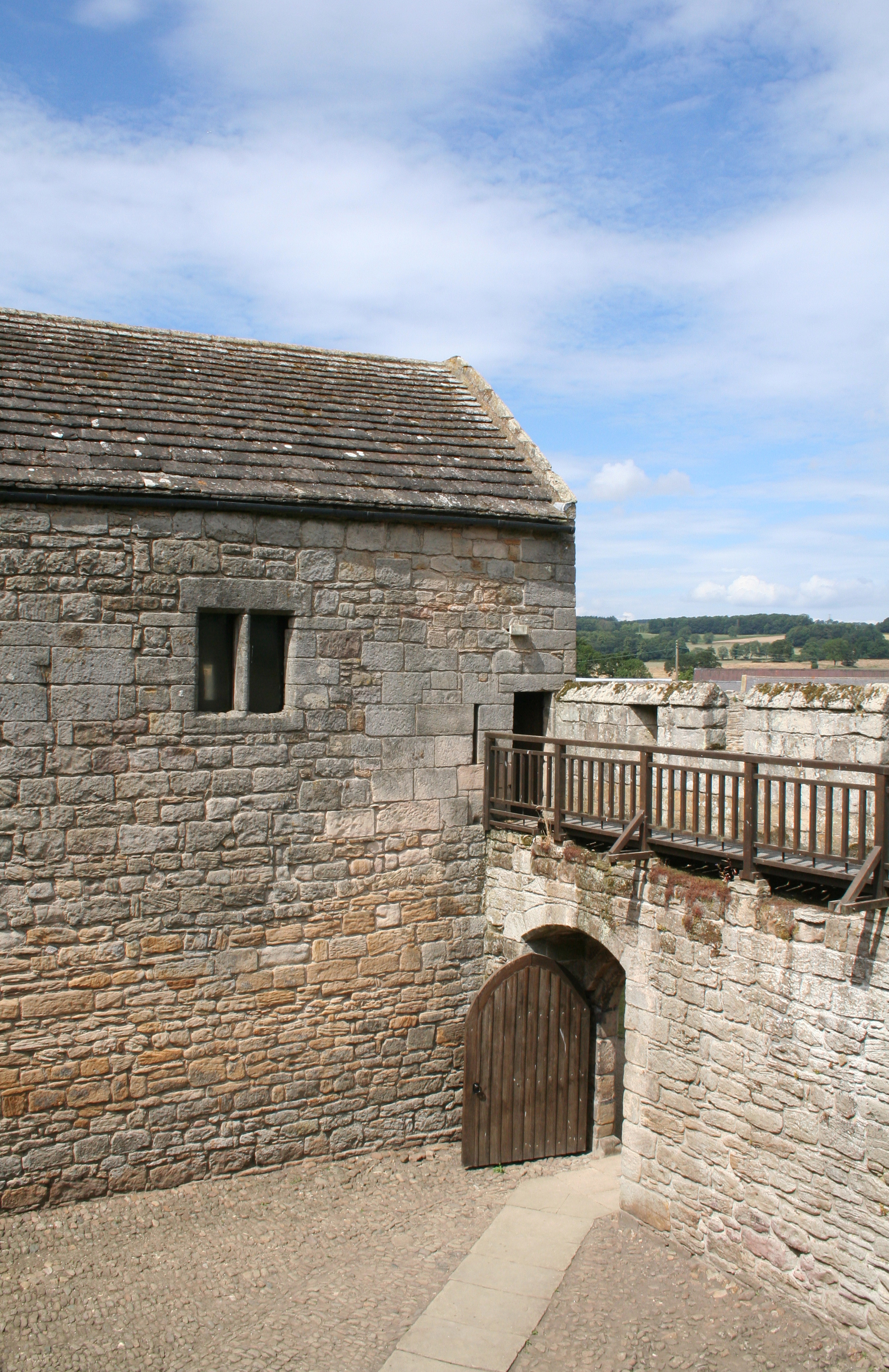
Aydon Castle

== Governance ==
Aydon was formerly a township, from 1866 Aydon was a civil parish in its own right until it was abolished on 1 April 1955 and merged with Corbridge.

== Landmarks ==
Aydon Castle is a fortified manor house and is a Scheduled Ancient Monument and a Grade I listed building. The manor house was built by Robert de Reymes, a wealthy Suffolk merchant, starting in 1296, adjacent to the steep valley of the Cor Burn. At this time the house consisted of a two-storeyed home with a solar, dining hall and kitchen on the upper floor.

In 1305, he obtained a licence to crenellate his property and added battlements and curtain walls. In the middle of the 16th century it was renovated and in the middle of 17th century it was converted into a farm. The building remained in use as a farm until 1966 but has since been restored to its medieval appearance.

== See also ==
- Halton, Northumberland
