= Boarhunt =

Village and parish in Hampshire, England

Coordinates: 50.8877°N 1.1478°W

- Location within Hampshire
- Population: 543
- OS grid reference: SU600101
- District: City of Winchester
- Shire county: Hampshire
- Region: South East
- Country: England
- Sovereign state: United Kingdom
- Post town: Fareham
- Postcode district: PO17
- Dialling code: 01329
- Police: Hampshire and Isle of Wight
- Fire: Hampshire and Isle of Wight
- Ambulance: South Central
- UK Parliament: Fareham and Waterlooville

Boarhunt (/ˈbɒrənt/) is a village and civil parish in the City of Winchester district of Hampshire, England, about 2 miles (3 kilometres) north-east of Fareham. The name of the village is a corruption of burh funta, the funta, (stream) by the fort (burh).

== History ==
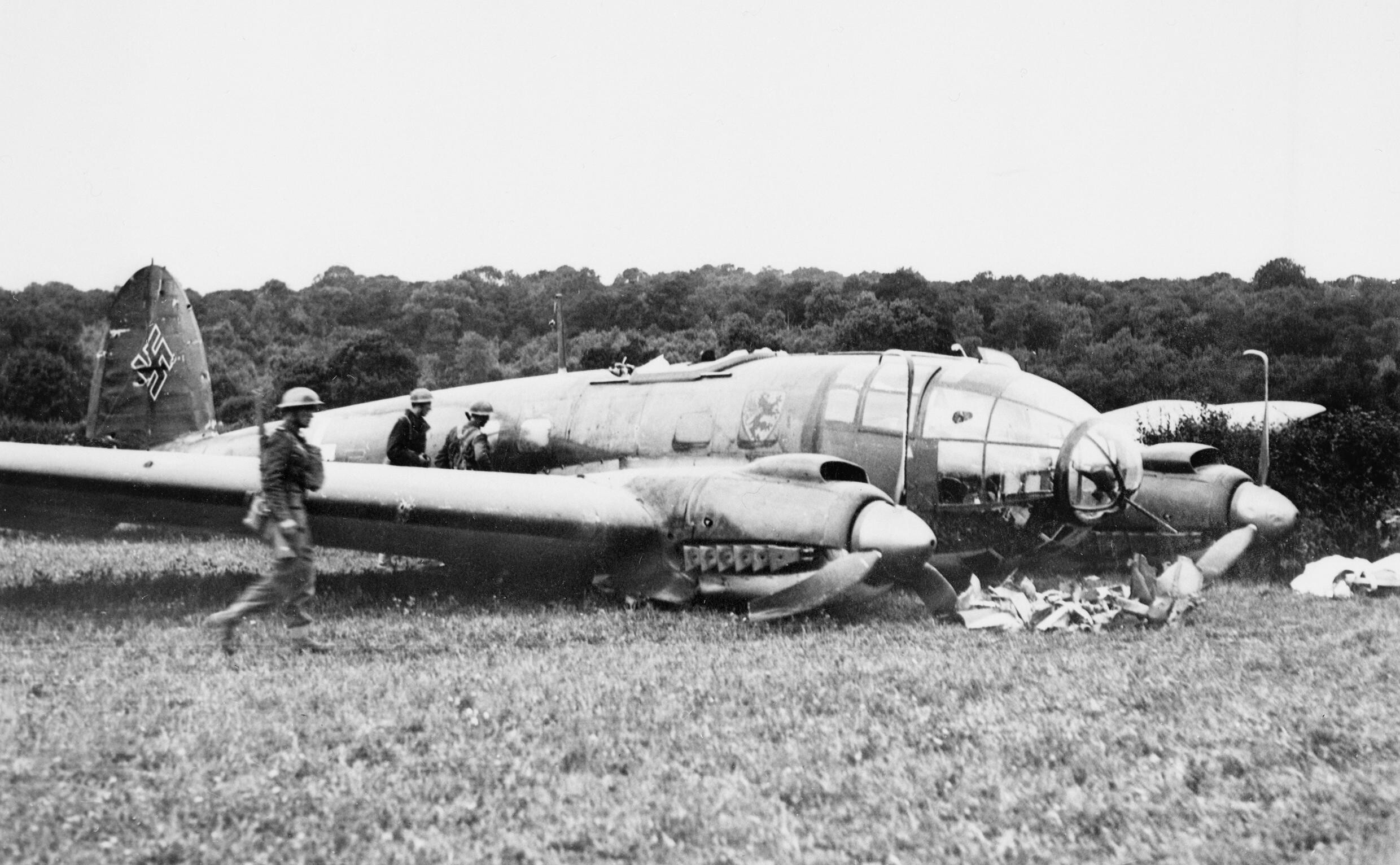
Heinkel He 111 P of Stab/KG 55 which crash-landed at Hipley in Hampshire on 12 July 1940, hit by Hurricanes of 'B' Flight, No. 43 Squadron over Southampton Water

The settlement is mentioned in the Domesday Book of 1086, when there were 27 households. Hall House in Boarhunt was dismantled in 1970 and reconstructed at the Weald and Downland Living Museum in West Sussex in 1981.

== Church ==
The village church is dedicated to St Nicholas; it is almost completely Saxon in its structure with its font probably dating to the same period. The building has been dated as having been constructed in 1064. Further work appears to have taken place in the 13th century. In 1577 a monument to Ralph Henslowe was added to the interior. A general restoration was carried out in 1853 at which point a bell turret was added and the current furnishings were fitted.
