= Crook Hall, Durham =

Crook Hall
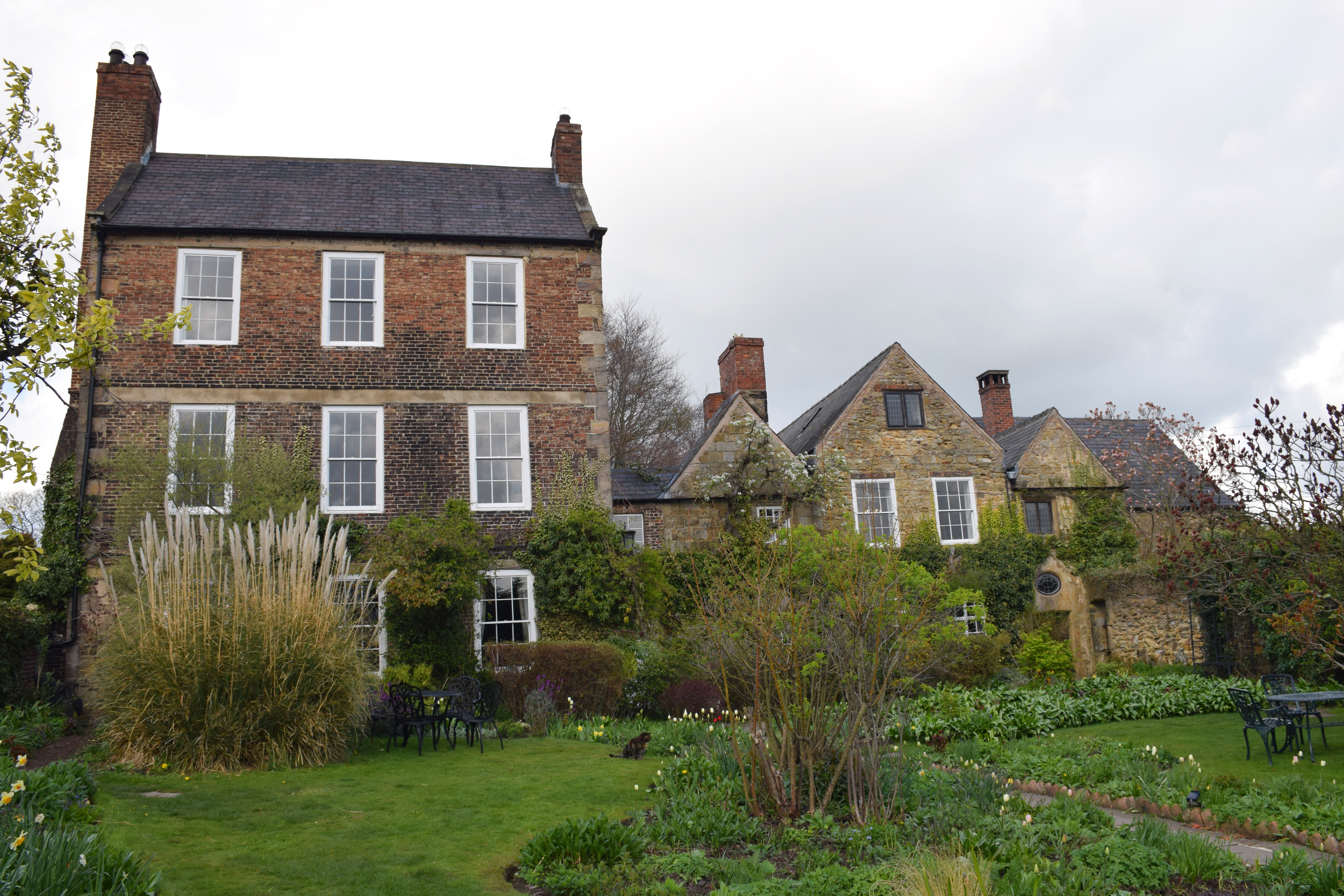
- The hall from its Georgian walled garden
- Interactive map of the Crook Hall area

General information
- Coordinates: 54.7825°N 1.5747°W
- Construction started: 13th-14th century
- Completed: 18th century

Website
- www.nationaltrust.org.uk/visit/north-east/crook-hall-gardens/index

Listed Building – Grade I
- Official name: Crook Hall
- Designated: 6 May 1952
- Reference no.: 1192563

Crook Hall is a Grade I listed house built in the 13th or 14th to 18th centuries, located in the Framwelgate area of the City of Durham.

The oldest part is an open hall house dating from the 13th or 14th century, built in sandstone with a Welsh slate roof. It is the only known domestic open hall in County Durham. In the 17th century the hall was extended to form a Jacobean manor house; then in the 18th century a large brick Georgian house was appended to the 17th-century wing, making up a house of 11 bays in all. It is surrounded by English country style gardens, seen as among the best in the north of England.

== History ==
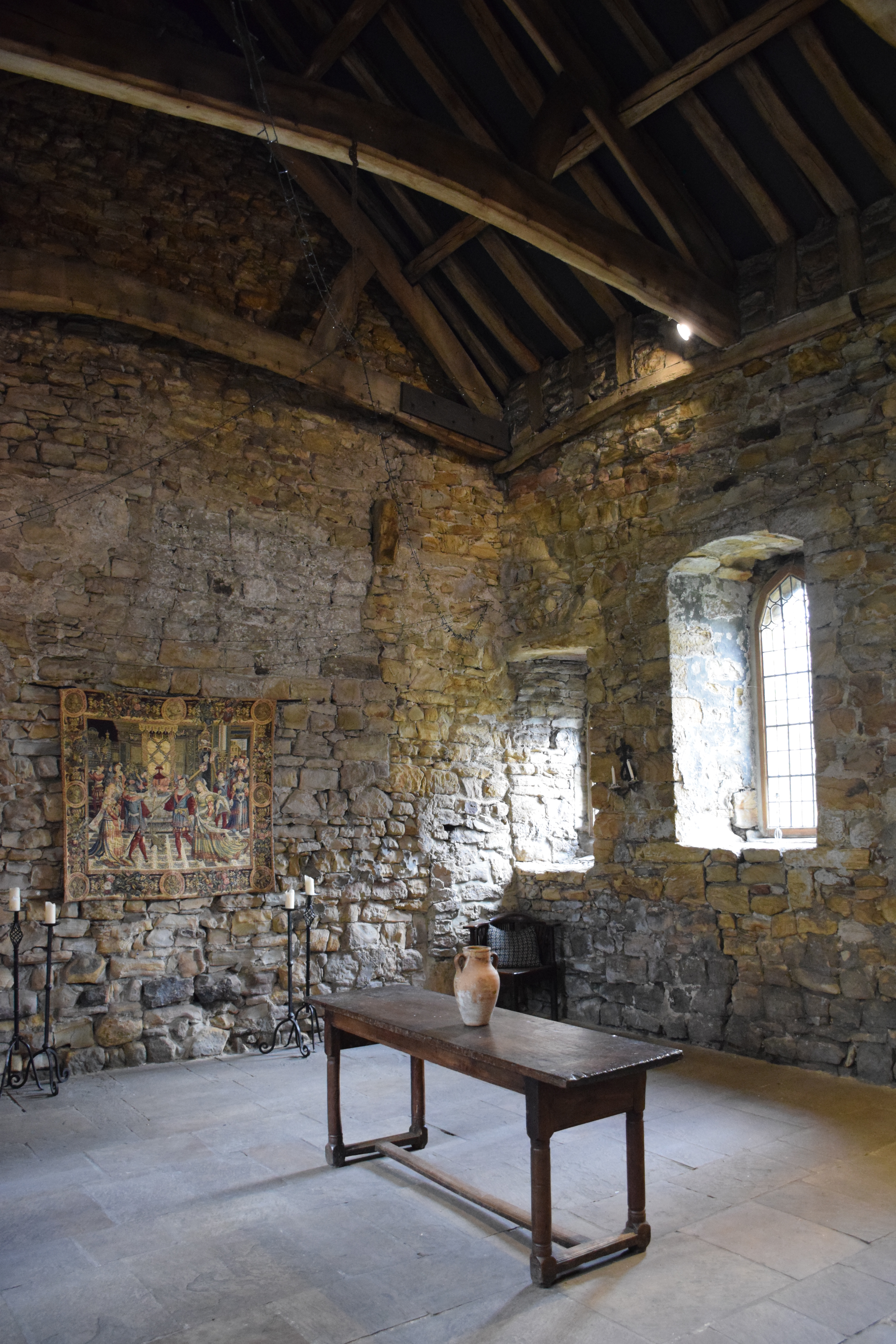
Inside the medieval hall

The Manor of Sydgate was granted in 1217 to Aimery, son of the then Archdeacon of Durham, from whose family it passed to Peter del Croke, after whom it is named. From him, it passed to the Billingham family, who occupied the hall for some 300 years. In 1657, it passed to the Mickletons until it was bought in 1736 by the Hoppers of Shincliffe. Since then there has been a succession of different owners until it was bought in a semi-derelict condition by the Cassels in 1928.

In 1995, the property was bought by Keith and Maggie Bell, who progressively opened the hall and gardens to the public, becoming a major wedding venue. Visitors from around the world came to wander around the gardens as well as the Hall. Keith Bell wrote a book in 2017 called Blood, Sweat and Scones – two decades at Crook Hall (ISBN 978-1-78803-528-6). In it, he describes their period of ownership, and the trials and tribulations of owning a Grade I listed building and creating a successful business/tourist attraction. In June 2020 the property closed to the public as the business went into liquidation as a result of the COVID-19 pandemic and associated lockdowns. The property was subsequently put on the market with a guide price of £1.8 million.

On 28 March 2022, the National Trust announced that it had acquired the property, with the intention of re-opening it to visitors. As of June 2024, the hall and gardens, a book shop and a cafe are open to visitors.

The building is reputedly haunted by the "White Lady".
