= Tree House, Crawley =

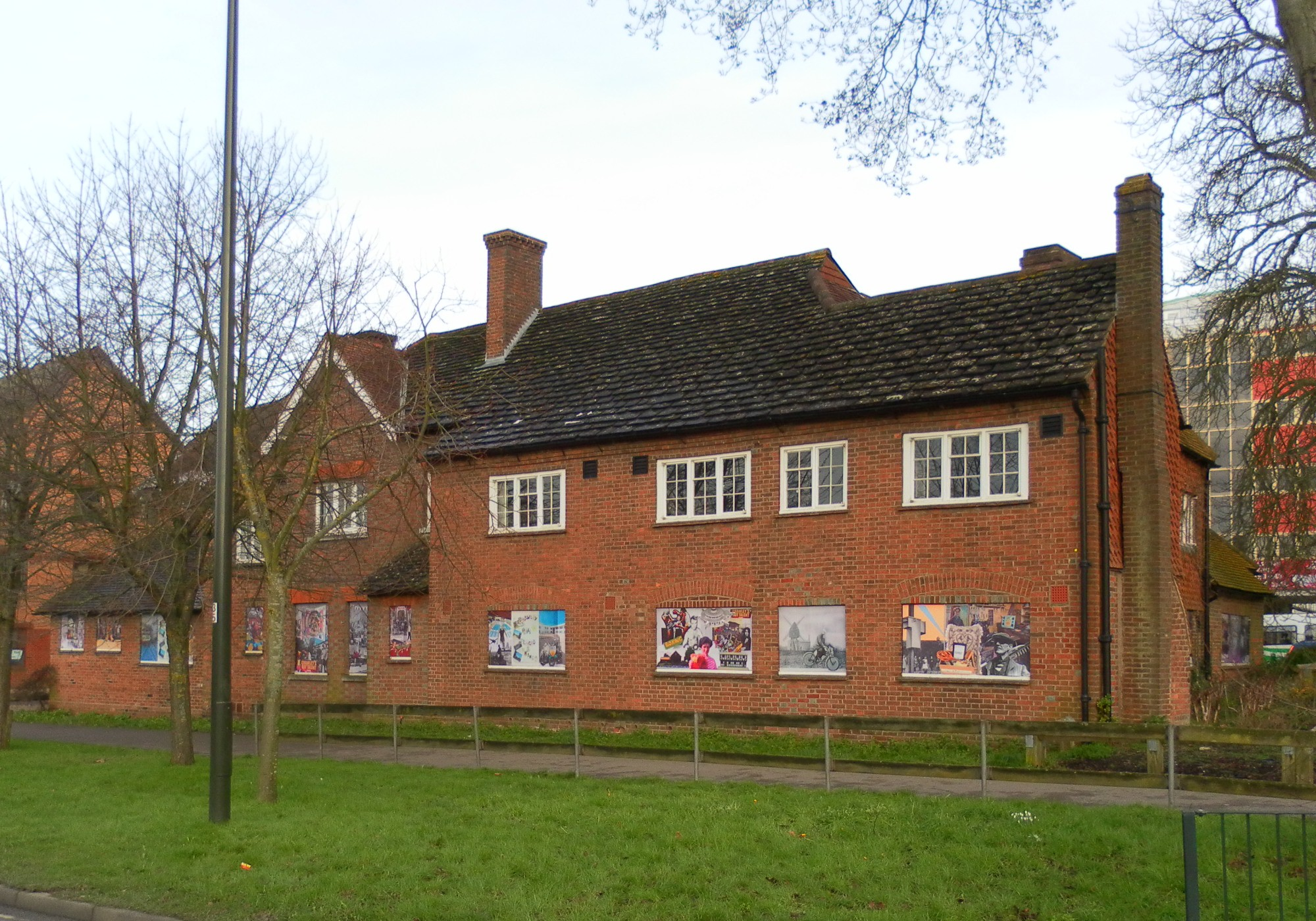
- The building from the west-southwest

- Location within West Sussex
- 51°7′0″N 0°11′21″W
- Type: Open hall-house
- Location: 103 High Street, Crawley
- OS grid reference: TQ 26825 36839

History
- Built: Early 15th century
- Rebuilt: 16th century

Site notes
- Area: West Sussex
- Architectural style: timber-framed
- Owner: Crawley Borough Council

Listed Building – Grade II
- Official name: Crawley Museum
- Designated: 21 June 1948
- Reference no.: 1298877

Tree House, also known as The Tree, is a medieval timber-framed house on the High Street in Crawley, a town and borough in West Sussex, England. It is the original manor house of Crawley, and was built in the early 15th century and rebuilt in the mid-16th century. It now has a modern exterior, but the old structure is still in place inside. Situated in a prominent position facing both the High Street and The Boulevard, two of Crawley town centre's main roads, its name commemorates an ancient elm tree which stood outside for hundreds of years and was one of Crawley's landmarks.

Tree House is currently occupied by the Crawley Museum.

== History ==
Although there was evidence of a small settlement by the 11th century, Crawley started to develop as a village in the 13th century when a charter was granted for a market. By the late 14th century, there was enough wealth in the area to justify the building of a manor house. Like other buildings of the era, it was timber-framed; many of these were demolished when the New Town was laid out after the Second World War, and Tree House is now the oldest such building on the High Street.

In the mid-16th century, in the midst of a period of rapid construction in the village, the building was substantially extended. Around this time, brick started to replace timber as the predominant building material in the area; the extension used timber, but soon afterwards a brick "skin" was added around the exterior. This remains in place today.

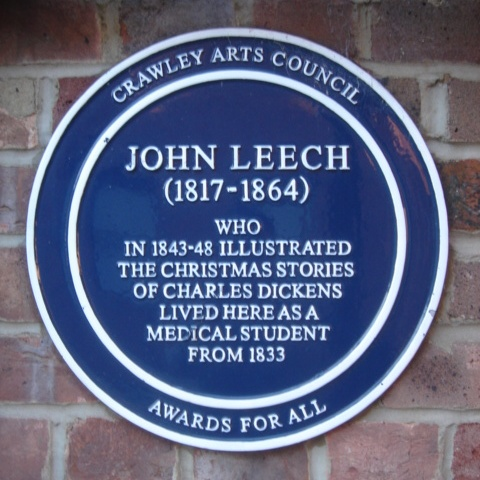
Commemorative plaque recording John Leech's residence

By the 18th century, Tree House lost its original use and passed into private ownership as part of the Worth Park estate, a country estate which covered large parts of Crawley (which was by this time a small town). By 1780 the building had started its long association with the medical profession: it was home to a family of doctors for about 130 years, although it was rented from the estate landowner for the whole time. The caricaturist John Leech also lived at the house for several years from 1833, while training as a medical student. He worked on the magazine Punch, which at the time was edited by fellow Crawley resident Mark Lemon, and illustrated Charles Dickens's series of Christmas stories in the 1840s. Later, the parish council (which became Crawley Urban District Council in 1956 and Crawley Borough Council in 1974) bought Tree House and used it to house various council services. These have since been moved to new purpose-built accommodation, leaving the building's future uncertain. In particular, it lies within the area covered by the Crawley "Town Centre North" masterplan, which proposes major changes and redevelopment for that part of the town centre. The latest version of the masterplan, dated September 2008, recommends that Tree House should be kept, while allowing "justified" alterations or extensions to be made.

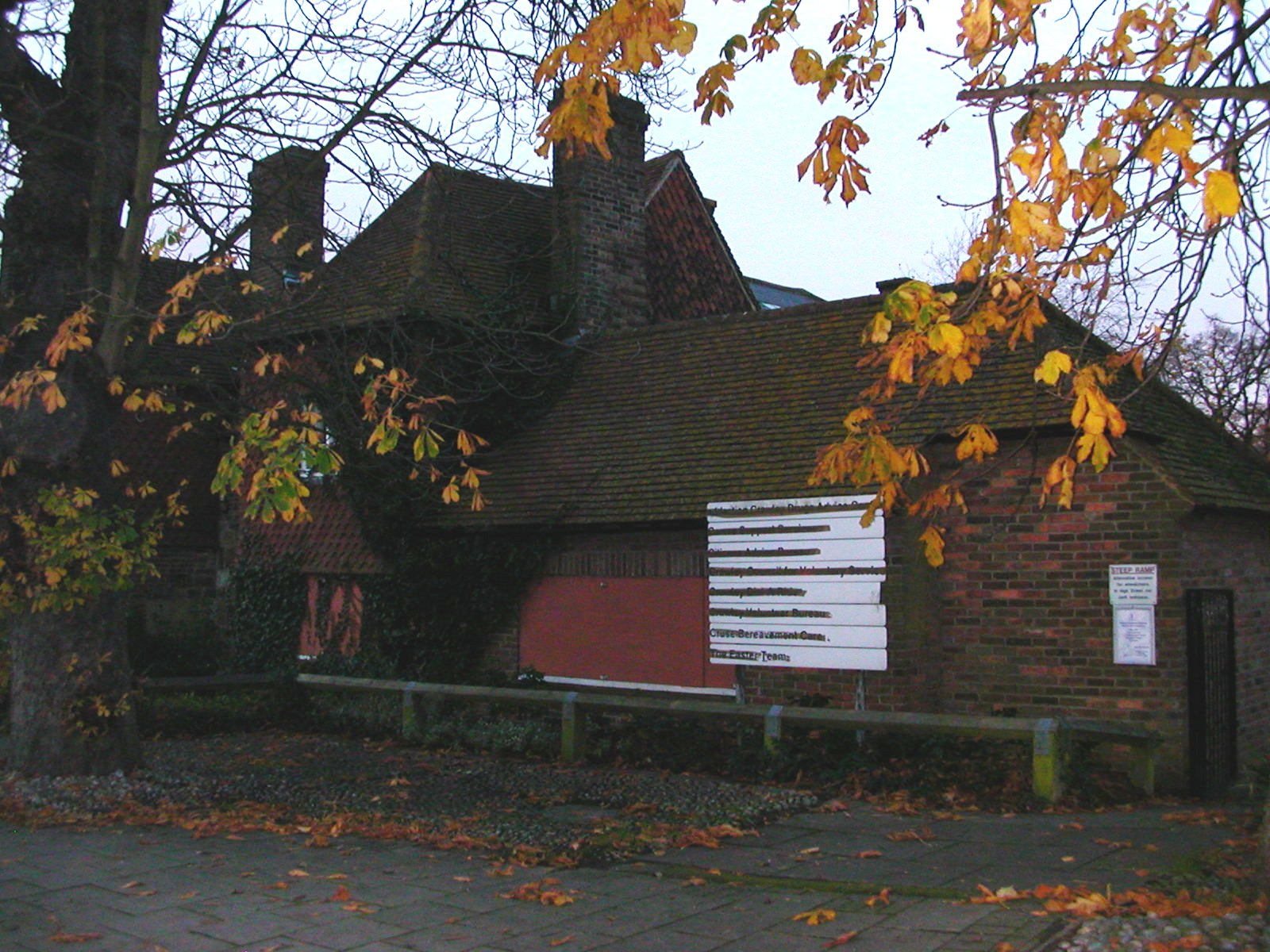
The solar wing (south front, facing The Boulevard). The blacked-out sign showed the services offered by the voluntary sector and Borough Council in the building until 2006

Until the late 20th century, a large barn-style hall stood in the gardens behind Tree House. It was built in the early 15th century as a moot hall—a mediaeval meeting place for villagers to discuss issues. The two-storey timber-framed building had four bays on the ground floor and a long room on the first floor. Threatened with demolition and replacement by an office block extension in the 1970s, it was instead dismantled, transported to the Weald and Downland Open Air Museum at Singleton and rebuilt there. At the museum, the building is now called the "Upper Hall".

The building's name, which seems to have been used from early in its history, refers to one of Crawley's oldest and most longstanding landmarks. The "Crawley Elm" stood immediately opposite; an ancient, substantial tree, it predated the building. A historical work about the county of Sussex published in 1835 devoted almost all of its summary of Crawley to a discussion of the tree. Another 19th-century author of a work about trees described its "tall, straight stem which ascends to a height of 70 feet [21 m] ... [and] the fantastic ruggedness of its roots". At that time its trunk had been partly hollowed out to form a small room which was used for various purposes: as a temporary lodging place for travellers to stay overnight; as a meeting room; and as a billet. The room had a circumference of about 35 feet (11 m), a door and some brickwork. Although the tree was already dying at this stage, parts of it remained until the New Town started to be built in the 1940s.

== Architecture ==
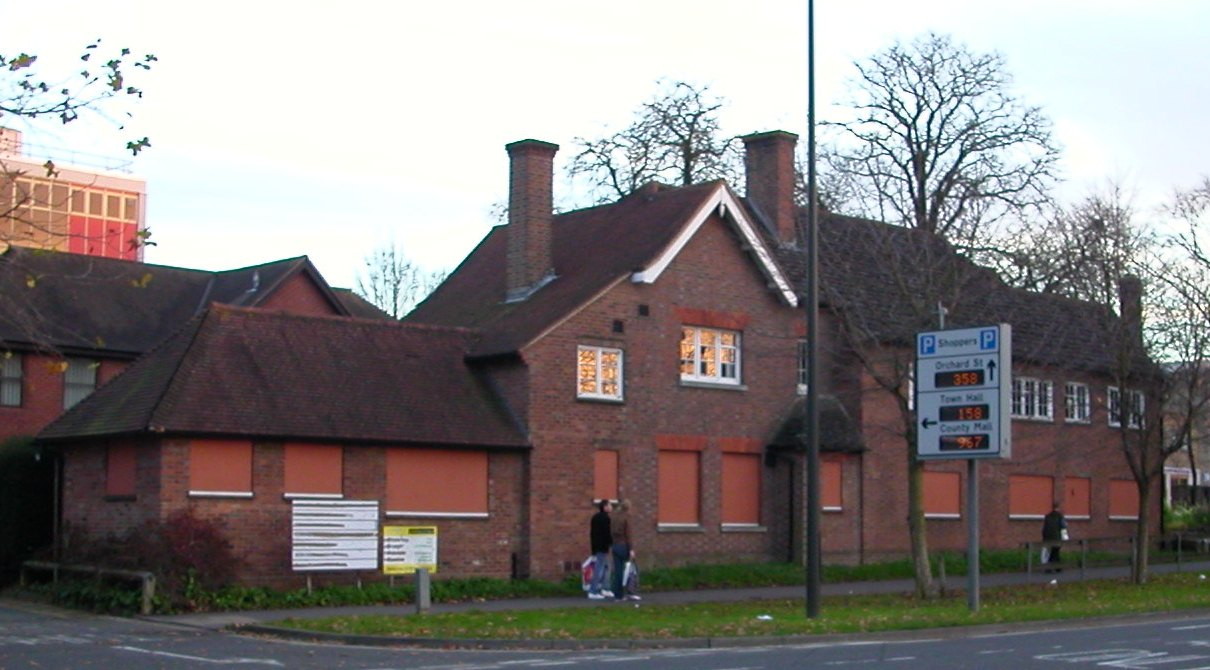
The west face of the building in 2008

Externally, Tree House has no pre-19th century features, but the original hall house remains inside the external brickwork. It occupies an L-shaped corner plot and consists of a Great hall (south to north, facing High Street) and a solar (west to east, facing the Boulevard). There is a Sussex stone chimney breast at the corner. The solar is in better condition, and has three bays and substantial exposed roof trusses with king-posts and tie-beams. The roofline is lower than that of the Great hall section, which is partly covered with slabs of Horsham stone, a material used often in the area. The 18th-century work added a new wing on the west side; changes were made at the northern end in the following century; and the most recent remodelling in 1936 resulted in more changes on this side. The windows were, until recently, boarded up but most were modern.

== The building today ==
Tree House was listed at Grade II by English Heritage on 21 June 1948, and is one of 100 listed buildings and structures in the Borough of Crawley. It is owned by Crawley Borough Council and was used until 2006 as a venue for various council-run services and voluntary-sector organisations, such as a Citizens Advice Bureau and a bereavement counselling service. However, it was considered unsuitable for this purpose, being cramped and unpleasant for staff and visitors, for example, there were no toilets on site. Also, space between the original walls and the more modern external brickwork had become a nesting site for vermin. These issues coincided with the building being designated as within the zone covered by the £700m "Town Centre North" regeneration programme. In response to a request from the voluntary sector tenants, to provide better accommodation, the Council moved all of the functions previously undertaken in Tree House to a new building (the Orchard) elsewhere in the town centre in November 2006. The building remained empty for some years until, in March 2010, it was identified as a possible location for the town's museum, and in May 2018 Crawley Museum opened at Tree House.
