= Aydon Castle =

Fortified manor house near Corbridge, Northumberland, England

- Aydon, Northumberland, England
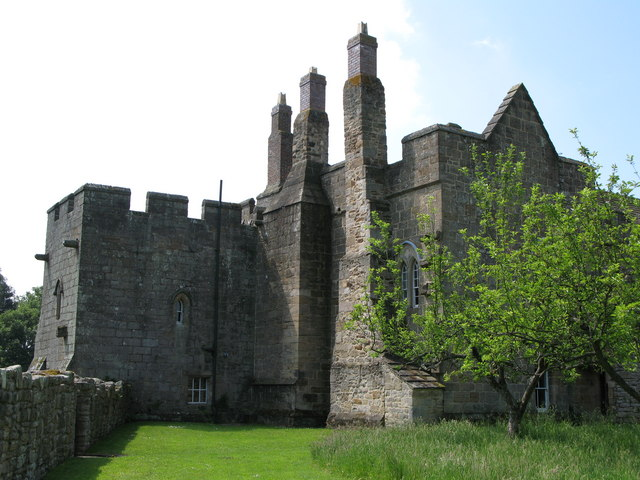
- Aydon Castle

Site information
- Type: Fortified manor house
- Owner: English Heritage
- Open to the public: Yes
- Condition: Restored

Location
- Shown within Northumberland.
- Location within Northumberland
- Coordinates: 54.9914°N 1.9994°W
- Grid reference: grid reference NZ001662

Site history
- Events: Scottish Wars of Independence

Aydon Castle, previously sometimes called Aydon Hall, is a fortified manor house at Aydon near to the town of Corbridge, Northumberland, England. It is a Scheduled Ancient Monument, and is designated by English Heritage as a Grade I listed building.

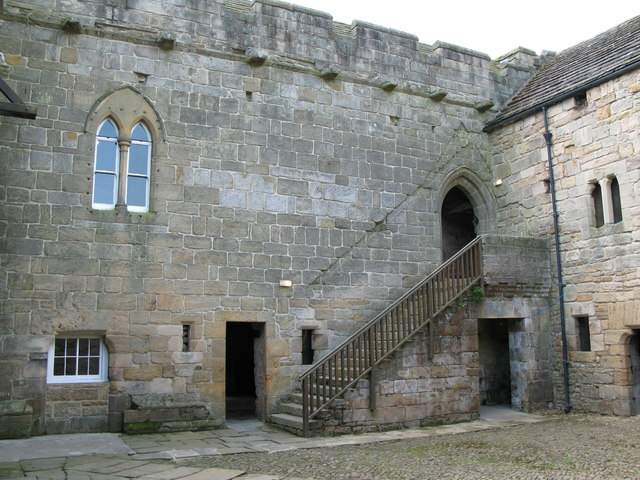
The courtyard of Aydon Castle

== History ==
=== Early history ===
Documentary evidence shows that a timber hall first existed on this site.

The land was purchased by Hugh de Raymes, a major Suffolk merchant, between 1293 and 1295. He bought the property from the estate of an impoverished neighbour in the hope of increasing his social stature and influence. The sale was delayed by legal complications and the estate was not released until 1296, after Hugh de Raymes's death in 1295: his son Robert took over ownership of the property and it was Robert who moved his household and made Aydon Hall his primary residence. The move was believed to be due to opportunities for Robert in the Scottish Wars of Independence, and it is known that Robert fought in Scotland between 1297 and 1298. Robert is believed to have fought at the Battle of Falkirk in 1298 against the Scottish forces of William Wallace. Upon Robert's return from fighting in Scotland, he began the construction of the first stone structure. Aydon had previously featured a wooden structure with a two-storey chamber block.

The original manor house began construction in 1296. At the time of its initial construction, the manor did not feature any defensive works or fortifications. Shortly after the stone construction began, Robert de Raymes added a two-storey hall range. Initially there was little need for fortifications to exist in Aydon. However, this changed in 1305 when Aydon Hall received permission to become a castle (licence to crenellate). It is possible that the crenellations were added only to increase the status of the hall, but it would soon prove necessary to fortify the hall beginning in 1311 and 1312, as Scottish border reivers began to launch raids into English territory. Aydon itself was attacked during this time, successfully repelling at least two known assaults by Scottish forces. These Scottish raiders managed to damage the surrounding area, but were unable to capture Aydon Hall itself.

The military and political situation became dire for the English in Northumberland following the Battle of Bannockburn in 1314. Aydon Castle was captured by the Scots in 1315 after the governor of the castle surrendered to the besieging forces. Aydon Castle was pillaged, burnt, and severely damaged by the Scots following the surrender of the garrison. The castle was further damaged in 1317 by English raiders seeking to loot whatever the Scots had left. The owner of Aydon Castle, Robert de Raymes, had been captured at Bannockburn and had been financially ruined by the destruction of his home and the 500-mark ransom he had paid for his release. Robert died in 1324 with little to his name. By this time, the estate was considered worthless.

=== Late history ===
Robert's son, also named Robert de Raymes, inherited the castle after his father's death. Robert II rebuilt and enhanced the fortifications that had been destroyed when the estate was captured. When Robert II de Raymes died in 1349, the property came into the ownership of Nicholas de Raymes. Nicholas attempted to rebuild the previous fortunes that the family had enjoyed, but was ultimately forced to sell the estate by the 15th century. Aydon changed hands a number of times with little change being made until the 17th century. From then onward, the castle was operated as a farmhouse. In the early 19th century, it was the residence of a George Bates.

=== Civil parish ===
Aydon Castle was a civil parish, in 1951 the parish had a population of 10. Aydon Castle was formerly a township in Corbridge parish, from 1866 Aydon Castle was a civil parish in its own right until it was abolished on 1 April 1955 and merged with Corbridge.

=== Today ===
Aydon Hall's use as a farmhouse ended in 1966 when the property was opened to the public as a historic site. The site has been owned and operated by English Heritage in recent years, and is listed as a Grade I listed building. The location is popular for tourists and locals, and is considered to be an excellent example of a fortified manor house.

== See also ==
- Prudhoe Castle
- Castles in Great Britain and Ireland
- List of castles in England

== Sources ==
- Grundy, John (2022). History of Northumberland. Newcastle upon Tyne: Tyne Bridge Publishing. ISBN 9781838280970.
