= Jack Patterson =

Jack Patterson may refer to:

- Jack A. Patterson (1890–1971), American politician in North Dakota
- Jack Patterson (Canadian politician) (1884–1964), Canadian politician, member of the House of Commons of Canada
- Jack Patterson (songwriter), English musician, member of the band Clean Bandit
- Jack Patterson (footballer) (1911-1994), Australian rules footballer
- Jack Patterson (River City), fictional character
- Jack Patterson (hurdler) (born 1912), winner of the 400 m hurdles at the 1938 USA Outdoor Track and Field Championships

== See also ==
- Jack Paterson (disambiguation)
- John Patterson (disambiguation)
