= Grade II* listed buildings in Tunbridge Wells (borough) =

There are over 20,000 Grade II* listed buildings in England. This page is a list of these buildings in the district of Tunbridge Wells in Kent.

== Tunbridge Wells ==
Name	Location	Type	Completed (Note: The date given is the date used by Historic England as significant for the initial building or that of an important part in the structure's description.)	Date designated	Grid ref. (Note: The grid reference is based on the British national grid reference system, sometimes known as OSGB36, used by the Ordnance Survey.) Geo-coordinates	Entry number (Note: The "List Entry Number" is a unique number assigned to each listed building and scheduled monument by Historic England.)	Image
Babbs Farmhouse	Benenden, Tunbridge Wells	Farmhouse	18th century	20 June 1967	TQ7913932948; 51°04′04″N 0°33′19″E	1281647	Babbs Farmhouse More images
Capel Manor House, including the remains of the winter garden and the arcaded retaining wall with balustrade and steps belonging to an earlier house	Horsmonden	House	1969-70	18 September 2013	TQ7133140019; 51°08′02″N 0°26′51″E	1413746	Capel Manor House, including the remains of the winter garden and the arcaded retaining wall with balustrade and steps belonging to an earlier house More images
Church of St George	Benenden	Parish Church	14th century	2 June 1967	TQ8084032670; 51°03′54″N 0°34′46″E	1204075	Church of St George More images
Coggers	Benenden	House	C20	20 June 1967	TQ8169433790; 51°04′29″N 0°35′32″E	1085203	Upload Photo
Old Standen	Benenden	House	18th century	9 June 1952	TQ8100530517; 51°02′44″N 0°34′51″E	1336746	Upload Photo
Pympe Manor	Goddard's Green, Benenden	House	18th century	9 June 1952	TQ8272134436; 51°04′49″N 0°36′26″E	1085238	Upload Photo
The Paper Mill	Benenden	House	Later	9 June 1952	TQ7852631054; 51°03′04″N 0°32′45″E	1281560	Upload Photo
The Red House	Goddard's Green, Benenden	House	18th century	5 July 1993	TQ8235034668; 51°04′56″N 0°36′07″E	1281552	Upload Photo
Watermill House	Benenden	House	C20	9 June 1952	TQ7979930517; 51°02′45″N 0°33′49″E	1281500	Upload Photo
Parish Church of St Lawrence	Bidborough	Parish Church	12th century nave	20 October 1954	TQ5651143205; 51°10′00″N 0°14′14″E	1248826	Parish Church of St Lawrence More images
The Grange	Bidborough	House	Possible earlier house	20 October 1954	TQ5641843034; 51°09′55″N 0°14′09″E	1277723	Upload Photo
Archway about 15 Metres East of Brenchley Manor	Brenchley	Gate	Early C20	24 August 1990	TQ6762342094; 51°09′13″N 0°23′44″E	1249084	Upload Photo
Brenchley Manor	Brenchley	House	Probably 18th century	20 October 1954	TQ6759542105; 51°09′13″N 0°23′42″E	1277671	Upload Photo
Coach House about 40 Metres North East of Matfield House	Matfield, Brenchley	Coach House	c. 1736	20 October 1954	TQ6585441938; 51°09′10″N 0°22′12″E	1263150	Upload Photo
Stable Building about 50 Metres East of Matfield House	Matfield, Brenchley	Stable	Probably 1736	20 October 1954	TQ6585541919; 51°09′09″N 0°22′12″E	1250647	Upload Photo
Walls, Gate Piers, Railings and Gates to the Garden South and West of Matfield House	Matfield, Brenchley	Gate	Early 18th century	20 October 1954	TQ6579841909; 51°09′09″N 0°22′09″E	1263149	Walls, Gate Piers, Railings and Gates to the Garden South and West of Matfield House
Matfield House Cottages	Matfield, Brenchley	Row	Probably circa 1730	20 October 1954	TQ6586841907; 51°09′09″N 0°22′13″E	1250648	Matfield House Cottages More images
Old Cryals	Brenchley	Farmhouse	Circa early 14th century or earlier	24 August 1990	TQ6613140337; 51°08′18″N 0°22′24″E	1249521	Upload Photo
Old Tong Farmhouse	Brenchley	Farmhouse	Circa mid 17th century	20 October 1954	TQ6749039735; 51°07′57″N 0°23′33″E	1251138	Upload Photo
Studmore	Brenchley	House	1662	20 October 1954	TQ6681641824; 51°09′05″N 0°23′02″E	1277603	Upload Photo
Terry's, High Street (Town Farm Cottage)	Brenchley	Cross Passage House	1990	20 October 1954	TQ6798141778; 51°09′02″N 0°24′01″E	1249608	Terry's, High Street (Town Farm Cottage) More images
The Old Palace	Brenchley	House	17th century	20 October 1954	TQ6791241800; 51°09′03″N 0°23′58″E	1263658	The Old Palace More images
The Old Vicarage	Brenchley	House	Later alterations	20 October 1954	TQ6793641759; 51°09′02″N 0°23′59″E	1250138	Upload Photo
The Old Workhouse	Brenchley	House	Converted 1950's	20 October 1954	TQ6778441855; 51°09′05″N 0°23′51″E	1250070	The Old Workhouse More images
Tatlingbury Farmhouse, including Garden Walls adjoining to the West	Capel	House	16th century	20 October 1954	TQ6382645009; 51°10′51″N 0°20′33″E	1262828	Upload Photo
The Postern	Tudeley, Capel	House	Dated 1757	20 October 1954	TQ6072246206; 51°11′33″N 0°17′55″E	1253179	The Postern More images
Thistles & Wenhams Cottages	Five Oak Green, Capel	Farmhouse	Dated circa 1436	20 October 1954	TQ6479545550; 51°11′08″N 0°21′24″E	1254121	Upload Photo
Upper Postern Farmhouse	Tudeley, Capel	Farmhouse	Early 18th century	20 October 1954	TQ6153746065; 51°11′28″N 0°18′37″E	1253225	Upper Postern Farmhouse More images
George Hotel, Anderson and Sons Butchers, Lemon Blue Gift Shop, Oliver Fisher Estate Agents, The Cornerhouse Flat.	Cranbrook	Court Room	Before 19th century	9 June 1952	TQ7765136078; 51°05′47″N 0°32′09″E	1075155	George Hotel, Anderson and Sons Butchers, Lemon Blue Gift Shop, Oliver Fisher Estate Agents, The Cornerhouse Flat. More images
Bangham's Electrical Shop Jeneleen Hairdressers Vegetare	Cranbrook	Cloth Hall	Late 15th century with jettying	20 June 1967	TQ7753736053; 51°05′47″N 0°32′03″E	1084827	Upload Photo
Bell Cottage & Sissinghurst Post Office	Sissinghurst, Cranbrook	House	1986	20 June 1967	TQ7941637524; 51°06′32″N 0°33′42″E	1084811	Bell Cottage & Sissinghurst Post Office More images
Bettenham Manor and Oast to the West	Three Chimneys, Cranbrook	House	17th century	20 June 1967	TQ8169239118; 51°07′21″N 0°35′42″E	1338661	Bettenham Manor and Oast to the West
Coursehorn	Cranbrook	Cloth Hall	16th century	20 June 1967	TQ7925835826; 51°05′37″N 0°33′31″E	1336925	Upload Photo
Cranbrook School House and Walls to South	Cranbrook	Gate	1727	9 June 1952	TQ7779336070; 51°05′47″N 0°32′16″E	1084796	Upload Photo
Friezley and Weavers	Cranbrook	Cloth Hall	1952	9 June 1952	TQ7743238209; 51°06′57″N 0°32′01″E	1347912	Friezley and Weavers More images
Glassenbury Park House	Cranbrook	Country House	Late 15th century	27 January 1977	TQ7470836648; 51°06′09″N 0°29′38″E	1101470	Upload Photo
Goddards Green Farmhouse	Cranbrook	Farmhouse	1986	9 June 1952	TQ7671035799; 51°05′39″N 0°31′20″E	1084183	Upload Photo
Hill House	Cranbrook	House	1952	9 June 1952	TQ7786135906; 51°05′42″N 0°32′19″E	1084833	Hill House More images
King's Head House	Sissinghurst, Cranbrook	House	16th century	20 June 1967	TQ7934037534; 51°06′33″N 0°33′38″E	1084814	King's Head House More images
Providence Chapel	Cranbrook	Presbyterian Chapel	1795	9 June 1967	TQ7767836008; 51°05′45″N 0°32′10″E	1084808	Providence Chapel More images
Shepherds	Cranbrook	House	1952	9 June 1952	TQ7732535994; 51°05′45″N 0°31′52″E	1336920	Upload Photo
The Old Cloth Hall	Cranbrook	House	1952	9 June 1952	TQ7910235728; 51°05′34″N 0°33′23″E	1084868	Upload Photo
The Priest's House at Sissinghurst Castle	Cranbrook	Priests House	16th century	20 June 1967	TQ8081638363; 51°06′58″N 0°34′55″E	1346286	The Priest's House at Sissinghurst Castle More images
The South Cottage	Sissinghurst, Cranbrook	House	Fragment of c1570 house	20 June 1967	TQ8084238283; 51°06′55″N 0°34′56″E	1084164	The South Cottage More images
Wilsley Hotel	Cranbrook	House	1864-70	20 June 1967	TQ7784736943; 51°06′15″N 0°32′20″E	1346269	Upload Photo
Balcombe Farmhouse	Frittenden	House	altered 16th century	20 June 1967	TQ8207640916; 51°08′19″N 0°36′05″E	1338652	Upload Photo
Church of St Mary	Frittenden	Parish Church	Medieval	20 June 1967	TQ8131840953; 51°08′21″N 0°35′26″E	1116253	Church of St Mary More images
Great Bubhurst	Frittenden	House	altered 1790	20 June 1967	TQ8315941712; 51°08′43″N 0°37′02″E	1084760	Upload Photo
Ponds Farmhouse	Frittenden	Jettied House	15th century	9 June 1952	TQ8260740909; 51°08′18″N 0°36′32″E	1186236	Upload Photo
Barn and Stable about 20 Metres North of Gatehouse	Goudhurst	Barn	16th century	22 June 1989	TQ7055835987; 51°05′52″N 0°26′04″E	1338713	Upload Photo
Bedgebury Park, Stable Courts and Garden Terraces	Bedgebury Park, Goudhurst	Country House/School	1688 core	19 March 1982	TQ7211734376; 51°04′58″N 0°27′21″E	1084710	Bedgebury Park, Stable Courts and Garden Terraces More images
Church Cottage & Church House	Goudhurst	Continuous Jetty House	c. 1900	9 June 1952	TQ7232737819; 51°06′50″N 0°27′38″E	1338719	Upload Photo
Gatehouse and Restored Early C20 Wall to Front Garden Wall (attached)	Goudhurst	House	15th century	9 June 1952	TQ7055135953; 51°05′51″N 0°26′04″E	1104867	Upload Photo
Maypole	Goudhurst	House	altered 18th century	22 June 1989	TQ7272937913; 51°06′52″N 0°27′59″E	1338670	Maypole
Pattyndenne Manor and Rear Courtyard	Goudhurst	House	Late 15th century	9 June 1952	TQ7199436585; 51°06′10″N 0°27′19″E	1320271	Pattyndenne Manor and Rear Courtyard More images
Risebridge Farmhouse	Risebridge, Goudhurst	Jettied House	Late 16th century	22 June 1989	TQ7136736703; 51°06′14″N 0°26′47″E	1084656	Upload Photo
Twyssenden Manor and Wall Projecting	Twyssenden, Goudhurst	House	16th century to 17th century	9 June 1952	TQ7136035207; 51°05′26″N 0°26′44″E	1106244	Twyssenden Manor and Wall Projecting
Bedgebury Lower School & Collingwood House and Wall attached	Hawkhurst	House	Mid 18th century	20 June 1967	TQ7572729313; 51°02′11″N 0°30′18″E	1084640	Upload Photo
Marlborough House School	Hawkhurst	House	1723	9 June 1952	TQ7529030675; 51°02′55″N 0°29′58″E	1338729	Marlborough House School More images
Wetheringhope and Wall attached	The Moor, Hawkhurst	House	Mid 18th century	20 June 1967	TQ7558229564; 51°02′19″N 0°30′11″E	1338750	Upload Photo
Broadford	Horsmonden	Garage	1954	20 October 1954	TQ7130639689; 51°07′51″N 0°26′49″E	1326674	Broadford
Grovehurst	Horsmonden	Cross Wing House	15th century	20 October 1954	TQ7160540722; 51°08′24″N 0°27′06″E	1338776	Grovehurst More images
Hale Farmhouse	Horsmonden	House	18th century	20 October 1954	TQ6860139271; 51°07′40″N 0°24′29″E	1322819	Upload Photo
Rectory Park & The Old Rectory	Horsmonden	House	Mid 18th century	20 October 1954	TQ7032938806; 51°07′24″N 0°25′57″E	1338186	Upload Photo
Spelmonden with Walls attached	Horsmonden	House	C17-C19	20 October 1954	TQ7024637168; 51°06′31″N 0°25′50″E	1338789	Upload Photo
Sprivers and Wall Attached	Horsmonden	House	Extended 16th century	20 October 1954	TQ6934039968; 51°08′02″N 0°25′08″E	1107213	Sprivers and Wall Attached More images
Coggers Hall	Lamberhurst	Jettied House	Mid-Late 16th century	20 October 1954	TQ6762936322; 51°06′06″N 0°23′34″E	1085286	Upload Photo
Downingbury Farmhouse	Pembury	Farmhouse	Early 18th century	14 April 1986	TQ6297742250; 51°09′23″N 0°19′45″E	1254438	Upload Photo
Upper Church of St Peter	Pembury	Church	1846-7	20 October 1954	TQ6260840643; 51°08′31″N 0°19′23″E	1254389	Upper Church of St Peter More images
Alderden Old Manor	Sandhurst	House	C20	9 June 1952	TQ7961529154; 51°02′01″N 0°33′37″E	1085159	Upload Photo
Church of St Nicholas	Sandhurst	Parish Church	13th century	20 June 1967	TQ7905627308; 51°01′02″N 0°33′05″E	1085172	Church of St Nicholas More images
Field Green House	Sandhurst	House	Mid to late 18th century	20 June 1967	TQ7853129661; 51°02′19″N 0°32′42″E	1204749	Upload Photo
Sponden Old Hall	Sandhurst	House	Late 16th century	5 July 1993	TQ7931329720; 51°02′20″N 0°33′23″E	1280956	Sponden Old Hall More images
Stables to East of Sir David Salomons' House	Southborough	Tack Room	1894	14 March 1973	TQ5701141654; 51°09′09″N 0°14′37″E	1298837	Upload Photo
Church of All Saints	Langton Green, Speldhurst	Parish Church	1862-3	24 August 1990	TQ5418039168; 51°07′52″N 0°12′08″E	1240546	Church of All Saints More images
Church of St Mary the Virgin	Speldhurst, Speldhurst	Parish Church	Tower base of 14th century	20 October 1954	TQ5535341438; 51°09′04″N 0°13′11″E	1240943	Church of St Mary the Virgin More images
Court Lodge	Old Groombridge, Speldhurst	Continuous Jetty House	Mid/late 15th century	20 October 1954	TQ5288437770; 51°07′08″N 0°10′59″E	1240325	Upload Photo
Crown Cottage	Old Groombridge, Speldhurst	House	19th century	20 October 1954	TQ5307037715; 51°07′06″N 0°11′08″E	1240711	Crown Cottage More images
Manor Cottage	Langton Green, Speldhurst	Farmhouse	Probably mid/late 15th century	25 October 1973	TQ5445939576; 51°08′05″N 0°12′23″E	1260429	Upload Photo
Mill adjoining to East of Mill House	Old Groombridge, Speldhurst	Grindstone	Probably late 17th century	24 August 1990	TQ5306837581; 51°07′01″N 0°11′08″E	1240549	Upload Photo
Mill House	Old Groombridge, Speldhurst	Lobby Entry House	Probably late 17th century	24 August 1990	TQ5306037579; 51°07′01″N 0°11′08″E	1240668	Upload Photo
Old Post Office Cottage	Speldhurst	Timber Framed House	Circa 1720-30	24 August 1990	TQ5539341486; 51°09′06″N 0°13′14″E	1260453	Upload Photo
Rose Cottage	Old Groombridge, Speldhurst	House	19th century	20 October 1954	TQ5298737691; 51°07′05″N 0°11′04″E	1067570	Upload Photo
Somerden	Old Groombridge, Speldhurst	House	Possible earlier origins	20 October 1954	TQ5308437739; 51°07′07″N 0°11′09″E	1240712	Upload Photo
The Crown including Service Buildings adjoining to North	Old Groombridge, Speldhurst	House	Mid/late 17th century	20 October 1954	TQ5304637720; 51°07′06″N 0°11′07″E	1260396	The Crown including Service Buildings adjoining to North More images
The Dower House	Old Groombridge, Speldhurst	House	Circa 1680-90	20 October 1954	TQ5301937634; 51°07′03″N 0°11′06″E	1260835	Upload Photo
The George and Dragon	Speldhurst	House	Late C16/early 17th century	20 October 1954	TQ5538441388; 51°09′02″N 0°13′13″E	1241530	The George and Dragon More images
The Old Butchers	Old Groombridge, Speldhurst	House	Early/mid 18th century	20 October 1954	TQ5301537651; 51°07′04″N 0°11′05″E	1067566	The Old Butchers More images
The Old Town Post Office including Front Area Railings	Old Groombridge, Speldhurst	House	19th century	20 October 1954	TQ5300637663; 51°07′04″N 0°11′05″E	1067567	The Old Town Post Office including Front Area Railings More images
3 and 4 Bird–in–hand Street	Old Groombridge, Speldhurst	House	19th century	20 October 1954	TQ5298137702; 51°07′05″N 0°11′04″E	1067571	3 and 4 Bird–in–hand Street
5 Bird–in–hand Street	Old Groombridge, Speldhurst	House	19th century	20 October 1954	TQ5297437725; 51°07′06″N 0°11′03″E	1067572	5 Bird–in–hand Street
6 Bird–in–hand Street	Old Groombridge, Speldhurst	House	Possible earlier origins	20 October 1954	TQ5297037730; 51°07′06″N 0°11′03″E	1356671	6 Bird–in–hand Street
7 Bird–in–hand Street	Old Groombridge, Speldhurst	House	Possible earlier origins	20 October 1954	TQ5296637734; 51°07′07″N 0°11′03″E	1067573	7 Bird–in–hand Street
11 Bird–in–hand Street	Old Groombridge, Speldhurst	House	19th century	20 October 1954	TQ5295037751; 51°07′07″N 0°11′02″E	1261076	11 Bird–in–hand Street
12 Bird–in–hand Street	Old Groombridge, Speldhurst	House	Probably 18th century	20 October 1954	TQ5294437746; 51°07′07″N 0°11′02″E	1356672	Upload Photo
1 and 2 The Walks	Old Groombridge, Speldhurst	House	19th century	20 October 1954	TQ5299437721; 51°07′06″N 0°11′04″E	1241636	Upload Photo
3, 4, 5 and 6 The Walks	Old Groombridge, Speldhurst	House	Late 18th century or 19th century	20 October 1954	TQ5301137717; 51°07′06″N 0°11′05″E	1241720	Upload Photo
7, 8 and 9 The Walks	Old Groombridge, Speldhurst	House	Late C17/early 18th century	20 October 1954	TQ5303037721; 51°07′06″N 0°11′06″E	1241637	Upload Photo
Church of St Mark	Broadwater Down, Tunbridge Wells	Parish Hall	1985	7 June 1974	TQ5820637964; 51°07′09″N 0°15′33″E	1083780	Church of St Mark More images
Lecture Hall, former Mount Pleasant Congregational Church	Tunbridge Wells	Assembly Hall	1848	20 May 1952	TQ5843939566; 51°08′00″N 0°15′47″E	1084464	Lecture Hall, former Mount Pleasant Congregational Church More images
Parish Church of St Barnabas	Tunbridge Wells	Parish Church	1887-9	7 June 1974	TQ5887840146; 51°08′19″N 0°16′11″E	1338860	Parish Church of St Barnabas More images
Rock Villa	Tunbridge Wells	Villa	18th century	20 May 1952	TQ5827539705; 51°08′05″N 0°15′39″E	1338834	Rock Villa More images
Trinity Arts Centre (formerly Holy Trinity Church)	Tunbridge Wells	Arts Centre	1981	20 May 1952	TQ5837539492; 51°07′58″N 0°15′44″E	1223642	Trinity Arts Centre (formerly Holy Trinity Church) More images
7 The Pantiles	Tunbridge Wells	House	1660	20 May 1952	TQ5814738781; 51°07′35″N 0°15′31″E	1066598	7 The Pantiles More images
39 and 41 The Pantiles	Tunbridge Wells	Apartment	Later	20 May 1952	TQ5809838730; 51°07′34″N 0°15′28″E	1084436	39 and 41 The Pantiles More images
68 London Road (including 47 Church Road)	Tunbridge Wells	House	18th century	20 May 1952	TQ5818639437; 51°07′57″N 0°15′34″E	1225330	68 London Road (including 47 Church Road) More images
72 London Road	Tunbridge Wells	Villa	Early 19th century	20 May 1952	TQ5820839503; 51°07′59″N 0°15′35″E	1084485	72 London Road More images
1–17 Calverley Park Crescent	Tunbridge Wells	Bath House	1828-35	24 November 1966	TQ5875539459; 51°07′57″N 0°16′03″E	1346502	1–17 Calverley Park Crescent More images
Farnborough Lodge	Calverley Park	House	Early 19th century	20 May 1952	TQ5885539060; 51°07′44″N 0°16′08″E	1281705	Farnborough Lodge More images
Keston Lodge	Calverley Park	House	Early 19th century	20 May 1952	TQ5882139481; 51°07′57″N 0°16′07″E	1083781	Keston Lodge More images
Victoria Lodge	Calverley Park	House	Early 19th century	20 May 1952	TQ5869939407; 51°07′55″N 0°16′00″E	1203351	Victoria Lodge More images
1 Calverley Park	Calverley Park	House	Early 19th century	20 May 1952	TQ5879139409; 51°07′55″N 0°16′05″E	1203357	1 Calverley Park More images
2 Calverley Park	Calverley Park	House	Early 19th century	20 May 1952	TQ5885639456; 51°07′56″N 0°16′09″E	1083782	Upload Photo
3 Calverley Park	Calverley Park	Villa	Victorian	20 May 1952	TQ5891139435; 51°07′56″N 0°16′11″E	1083783	Upload Photo
4 Calverley Park	Calverley Park	Villa	Early Victorian	20 May 1952	TQ5895939414; 51°07′55″N 0°16′14″E	1203389	Upload Photo
5 and 6 Calverley Park	Calverley Park	Semi Detached House	Early 19th century	20 May 1952	TQ5882439405; 51°07′55″N 0°16′07″E	1083784	Upload Photo
7 Calverley Park	Calverley Park	House	Early 19th century	20 May 1952	TQ5886039402; 51°07′55″N 0°16′09″E	1083785	Upload Photo
8 Calverley Park	Calverley Park	House	Early 19th century	20 May 1952	TQ5890539384; 51°07′54″N 0°16′11″E	1203390	Upload Photo
9 and 10 Calverley Park	Calverley Park	Semi Detached House	Early 19th century	20 May 1952	TQ5892839360; 51°07′53″N 0°16′12″E	1083786	Upload Photo
11 Calverley Park	Calverley Park	House	Early 19th century	20 May 1952	TQ5896639340; 51°07′53″N 0°16′14″E	1083787	Upload Photo
12 Calverley Park	Calverley Park	House	Early 19th century	20 May 1952	TQ5898339319; 51°07′52″N 0°16′15″E	1346497	Upload Photo
13 Calverley Park	Calverley Park	House	Early 19th century	20 May 1952	TQ5899639287; 51°07′51″N 0°16′15″E	1083744	Upload Photo
14 Calverley Park	Calverley Park	House	Early 19th century	20 May 1952	TQ5899839261; 51°07′50″N 0°16′16″E	1083745	14 Calverley Park
15 Calverley Park	Calverley Park	House	Early 19th century	20 May 1952	TQ5899439234; 51°07′49″N 0°16′15″E	1346498	Upload Photo
16 Calverley Park	Calverley Park	House	Early 19th century	20 May 1952	TQ5898439210; 51°07′48″N 0°16′15″E	1083746	16 Calverley Park
17 Calverley Park	Calverley Park	House	Early 19th century	20 May 1952	TQ5897439187; 51°07′48″N 0°16′14″E	1346499	Upload Photo
18 Calverley Park	Calverley Park	House	Early 19th century	20 May 1952	TQ5896339168; 51°07′47″N 0°16′14″E	1083747	18 Calverley Park
19 Calverley Park	Calverley Park	House	Early 19th century	20 May 1952	TQ5895339145; 51°07′46″N 0°16′13″E	1083748	Upload Photo
20 Calverley Park	Calverley Park	House	Early 19th century	20 May 1952	TQ5894639129; 51°07′46″N 0°16′13″E	1346500	Upload Photo
21 Calverley Park	Calverley Park	House	Early 19th century	20 May 1952	TQ5893339108; 51°07′45″N 0°16′12″E	1083749	Upload Photo
22 Calverley Park	Calverley Park	House	Early 19	20 May 1952	TQ5892939089; 51°07′45″N 0°16′12″E	1346501	Upload Photo
23 Calverley Park	Calverley Park	House	Early 19th century	20 May 1952	TQ5891639071; 51°07′44″N 0°16′11″E	1083750	Upload Photo
24 Calverley Park	Calverley Park	House	Early 19th century	20 May 1952	TQ5890839055; 51°07′43″N 0°16′11″E	1083751	Upload Photo
