= John Paterson =

John or Jack Paterson may refer to:

== Politics ==
- John Paterson (New York politician) (1744–1808), American soldier and politician
- John E. Paterson (1800–?), New York politician
- John Paterson (Cape politician) (1822–1880), politician and businessman of the Cape Colony
- John Paterson (Australian politician) (1831–1871), Australian politician in the New South Wales Legislative Assembly
- John Guthrie Paterson (1902–1986), Australian politician in the New South Wales Legislative Council
- Sir John Paterson, 3rd Baronet (c. 1730–1782), British politician

== Religion ==
- John Paterson (bishop of Ross) (1604–1679), father of the archbishop of Glasgow
- John Paterson (archbishop of Glasgow) (1632–1708), Bishop of Galloway, Bishop of Edinburgh
- John Paterson (missionary) (1776–1855), Scottish missionary in Scandinavia and the Russian Empire
- John Paterson (priest) (1938–2005), Anglican Dean of Christ Church Cathedral, Dublin
- John Paterson (bishop of Auckland) (born 1945), bishop of the Anglican Diocese of Auckland
- John M. K. Paterson (1922–2009), Scottish minister

== Sports ==
- John Paterson (Burton Swifts footballer), see 1894–95 Manchester City F.C. season
- John Paterson (footballer) (1897–1973), Scottish footballer
- Jock Paterson (1926–2000), Scottish footballer
- Jackie Paterson (1920–1966), Scottish boxer
- John Paterson (rugby union), Scottish international rugby union player
- Jack Paterson (footballer) (1900–1975), Australian rules footballer
- Jack Paterson (marathon runner) (c. 1913–?), Scottish track and field athlete

== Other ==
- John Paterson, Scottish biscuit baker, founder of the Royal Burgh Bakery
- John Paterson (architect) (died 1832), Scottish architect
- John Ford Paterson (1851–1912), Scottish–Australian artist
- John Johnstone Paterson (1886–1971), Hong Kong businessman and politician
- John Jardine Paterson (1920–2000), Scottish businessman
- John Ligertwood Paterson (1820-1882), Scottish medical doctor known for working in Bahia, Brazil
- Jack Paterson (actor) (born 1974), Canadian actor

== See also ==
- John Patterson (disambiguation)
