= John Thomas Patterson =

John Thomas Patterson may refer to:

- John Patterson (Medal of Honor) (1838–1922), Union Army soldier and Medal of Honor recipient
- John Thomas Patterson (geneticist) (1878–1960), American geneticist

== See also ==
- John Patterson (disambiguation)
