= Old Punch Bowl =

Listed pub in West Sussex, England

The Old Punch Bowl
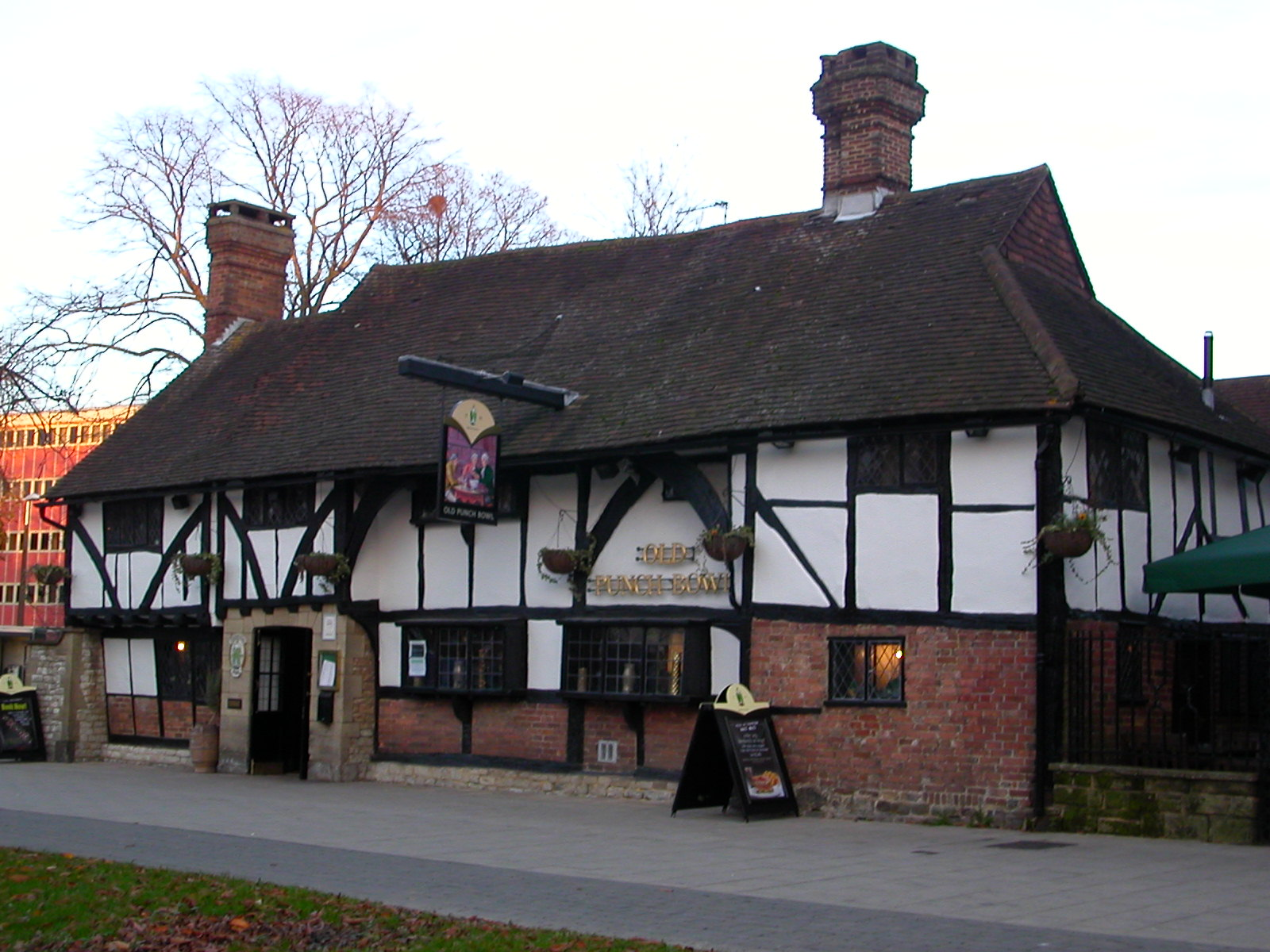
- The Old Punch Bowl from the southwest

- Location within Crawley
- Former names: Bristow(s) Meads; Mitchells Farm; The Mychells; Mychells Farm
- Alternative names: Ye Olde Punch Bowle

General information
- Type: Wealden hall house
- Location: 101 High Street, Crawley, West Sussex, England
- Coordinates: 51°6′58″N 0°11′22″W
- Year built: Early 15th century
- Owner: Greene King PLC
- Landlord: Greene King Retailing Ltd

Technical details
- Structural system: Timber framing

Listed Building – Grade II*
- Official name: The Old Punchbowl
- Designated: 21 June 1948
- Reference no.: 1187086

The Old Punch Bowl is a medieval timber-framed Wealden hall house on the High Street in Crawley, a town and borough in West Sussex, England. Built in the early 15th century, it was used as a farmhouse by about 1600, passing through various owners and sometimes being used for other purposes. Since 1929 it has been in commercial use—firstly as a tearoom, then as a bank, and since 1994 as a public house. When built, it was one of at least five similar hall houses in the ancient parish of Crawley; it is now one of the oldest and best-preserved buildings in Crawley town centre.

== History ==
The most important industries in the early history of Crawley were farming and iron smelting. The latter had taken place since the Iron Age in northern Sussex, where iron ore, lime and wood (for charcoal) were readily available. By the 15th century, the industry had declined to some extent but was still locally significant. Although there is no direct structural evidence, a building used in the industry may have occupied the site before the present structure; slag remnants have been unearthed on the land outside it. Furthermore, the site is very close to the ancient junction of the east–west and northeast–southwest trackways and rudimentary roads which ran between the main furnaces and forges in the area, at places such as Ifield and Bewbush. These ancient tracks were superseded by the High Street, on a north–south alignment, after the Norman Conquest in the 11th century.

The present building is known to date from the early to mid-15th century. Little is known about its earliest history—for example, its name was not recorded until the mid-16th century. Its original layout is believed to have consisted of four bays under a single roof of straw, with the centre bays laid out as an open hall and the outer pair each having a staircase leading to first-floor level. The upper floor was jettied, giving an overhanging appearance. A timber skeleton would have been surrounded by walls of wattle and daub containing plenty of clay, which is the main component of the soil in the Crawley area. All of these characteristics were typical of "Wealden" houses—a mediaeval style whose name reflects their prevalence in the Weald, the area of southeast England in which Crawley is situated. A fifth bay, with a crown post roof, was added at the north end in the early 16th century.

The building originally occupied 1 acre (0.4 ha), but its landholding gradually expanded as the owners acquired more land in Crawley, Ifield and Worth parishes. By 1600, several barns and similar buildings—all with thatched roofs—surrounded it, and the property had become a farm called Bristows Meads, nominally owned by a member of the wealthy Stydolf family from Headley in neighbouring Surrey. Ownership and tenancy was very complex at that time, however, and the Stydolf family did not occupy it. Instead it was let to various occupants. By the 1670s, a farmer called John Wybourne occupied Bristows Meads (also known as Bristow Meads by this time). He expanded the farm by renting more land, and one field later became known as Wybourne Field. The property passed out of Stydolf ownership in the early 18th century, and entered local ownership for the first time in 1785 when an Ifield family acquired it. Soon after this, John Mitchell took up the tenancy, stayed for several decades and became an important part of Crawley life in his role as a tax officer. By the early 19th century, the property had become known as Mitchells Farm, superseding its previous name. The variants "The Mychells" and "Mychells Farm" were also known.

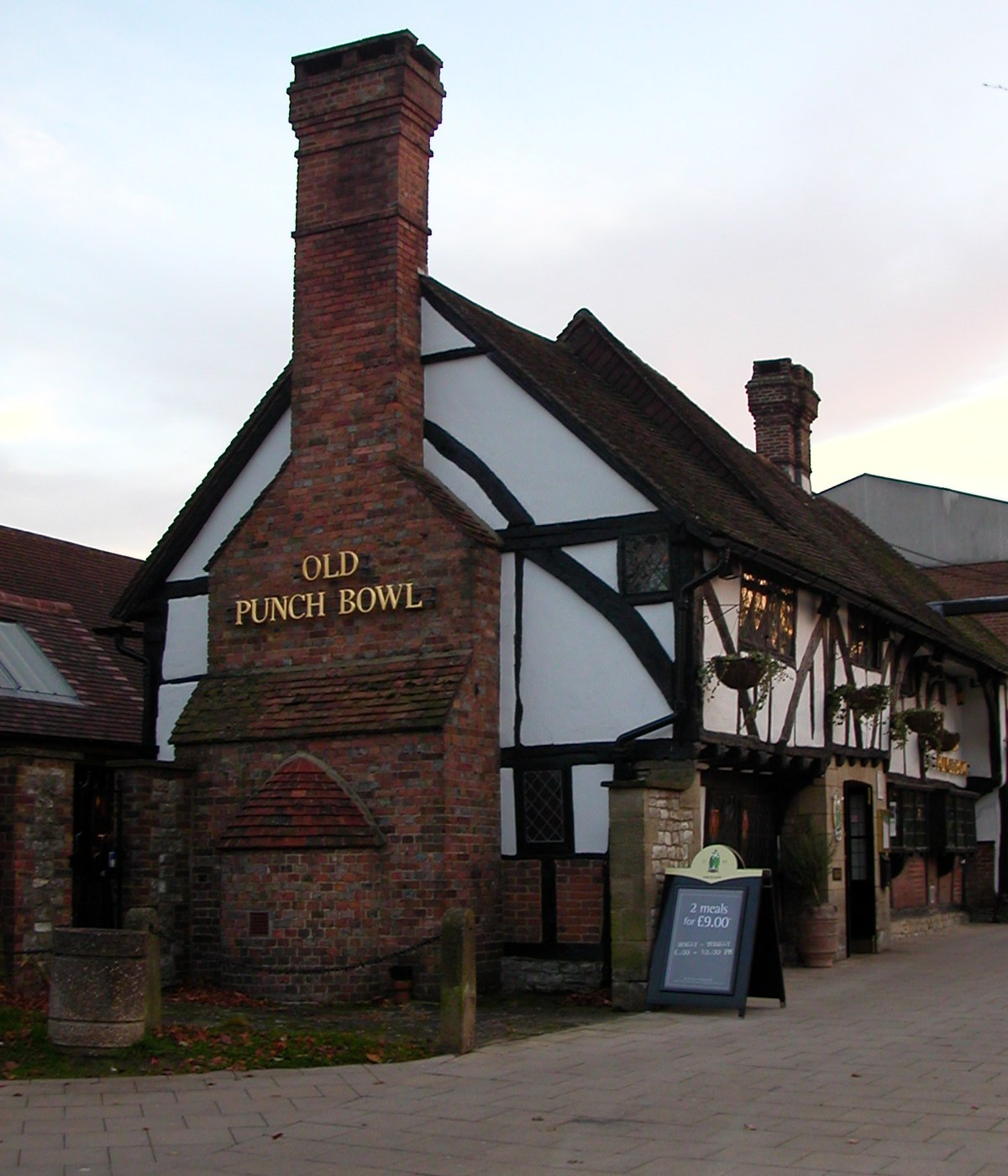
North end, showing the early-20th-century chimney

In the late 19th century, the building was divided into two houses, and was sometimes described as "The Old Houses" in commercial postcards. One of these houses was opened up to form a shop by its tenants. Meanwhile, the landholding had risen to 70 acres (28 ha) throughout Crawley and Worth parishes, and the farm was at one point the largest dairy farm in the area.

The condition of the main building deteriorated in the early 20th century as it passed through more owners. In 1929 a Mrs E. Messer and her husband bought the two houses in quick succession, and also acquired the farmyard, barns and associated buildings. They converted the main building into a single entity again, and oversaw a wide-ranging restoration which brought much of the old timber-framing into view again. Urgent structural repairs were carried out as well. Later in 1929, the Messers sold the building to a Captain L. Young, who applied to change its function from residential to commercial use. Significant work was undertaken to alter the building and its surroundings to create a tearoom with a rural ambience. The interior was opened out, a single entrance door was created, the old barns and outbuildings were either removed or integrated with the main building, and 0.5 acres (0.2 ha) of ornamental gardens were planted. The large chimney breast which now dominates the north face of the building was also added as part of these alterations, which took place in 1930. During that year, it reopened as "Ye Olde Punch Bowle" tearoom.

The tearoom had a short life but was successful and popular, especially during the Second World War when it doubled as a military mess, dance-hall and YMCA meeting place. It was sold for £2,500 in 1952 to National Provincial Bank, who refurbished it and converted it into a bank branch. The alterations were sympathetic to the building's style: wood from an ancient demolished church at Treyford near Midhurst was used for internal fittings, and the entrance doorway and an extension at the rear were built of local stone. The extension, a large single-storey office, was built in 1963 and looked out over the remaining section of what used to be the tearoom's gardens and ponds. The bank attempted to maintain the character and ambience of the building by filling the rooms with rare antiques; staff often had to rebuff tourists who wanted to buy them.

National Provincial Bank and Westminster Bank merged in the 1960s to form National Westminster Bank, and the branch was renamed accordingly. Although a larger branch was opened a short distance away on The Boulevard, the original branch stayed open until 1992. The freehold of the property was then bought by Greene King Brewery, who converted it into a public house and reinstated the name "The Old Punch Bowl". Internal and external alterations were made, including the removal of the bank's stone-built extension; this was replaced by outside seating and a patio area.

The Old Punch Bowl was Grade II* listed by English Heritage on 21 June 1948; this defines it as a "particularly important building of more than special interest" and of national importance. It is one of twelve Grade II* structures, and 100 listed buildings of all grades, in the Borough of Crawley.

== Architecture ==
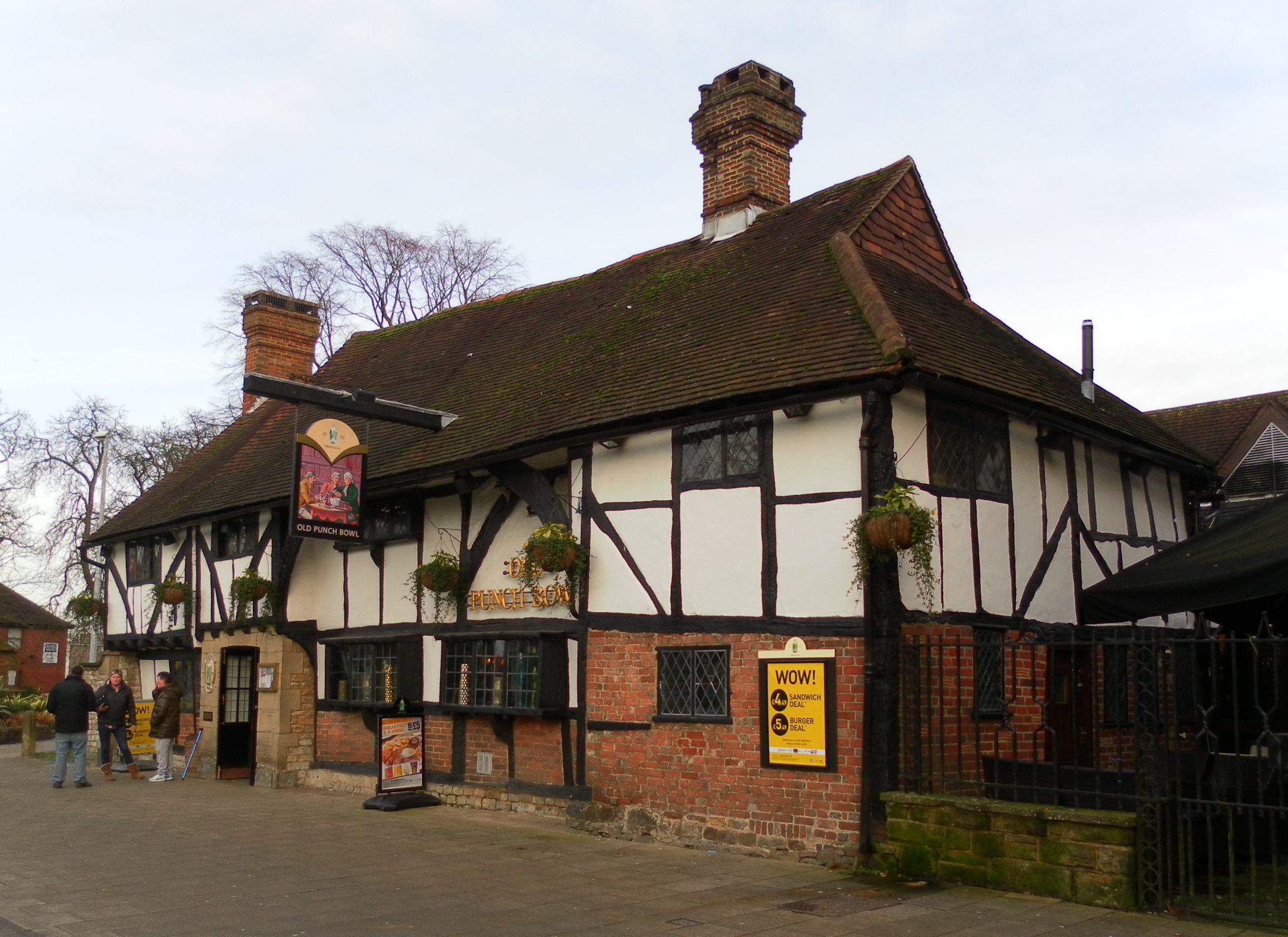
The building was originally a four-bay hall house

The Old Punch Bowl is considered a "good example" of a Wealden hall house; and Viscountess Wolseley's 1930s review of the historic houses of Sussex identified it as one of the county's two publicly accessible (rather than privately owned) mediaeval hall houses, along with Alfriston Clergy House. It has therefore been the subject of several architectural studies.

As originally built, the structure was a partly open-plan hall house with four bays. The bays at the north and south ends had joists to support exterior jettying, which originally extended about 18 inches (46 cm) over the floor below. The overhang was lessened by later building work. A fifth bay was added at the north end before 1550. This has a different roof profile and more prominent jettying, and may even have been a separate building at first. The recessed central bays forming the main hall are still intact and clearly visible.

The roof is now tiled, although Horsham stone was used previously and straw may have been used in the building's early history. It is hipped on the south side and gabled at the north, behind the modern chimney. The internal roof structure uses crown posts and queen posts throughout, with a mixture of flat and arched tie-beams. Except in the south bay, all of the internal timbers are original, albeit with some reconditioning, and the 20th-century work uncovered them for the first time in many years.

The windows are small and, on the upper floor, are just under the eaves. Two have 16th-century mullions, and one in the west face still has triangular holes in which metal bars were mounted to provide some security before window-glass became common.

Hall houses predated the invention of chimneys, and a wattle-and-daub smoke hood was used until the first chimney was added to the central bay in around 1600. This has been described as a "fine example of a [late] Tudor chimney".

== See also ==
- Grade II* listed buildings in West Sussex
