= John Patterson =

John Patterson may refer to:

== Military ==
- John Patterson (Medal of Honor) (1838–1922), Medal of Honor recipient
- John Henry Patterson (Medal of Honor) (1843–1920), Medal of Honor recipient
- John Henry Patterson (author) (1867–1947), Anglo-Irish soldier and writer

== Politics ==
- John Patterson (Ohio congressman) (1771–1848), U.S. congressman from Ohio
- John Patterson (Ohio state representative) (born 1956)
- John G. Patterson (1831–1878), member of the Iowa Senate
- John J. Patterson (1830–1912), U.S. senator from South Carolina, 1873–1879
- John M. Patterson (1921–2021), U.S. politician from Alabama
- John Paterson (New York politician) (often spelled Patterson, 1744–1808), New York congressman
- John Patterson (Southern Maori politician) (1821–1899), New Zealand Māori member of Parliament
- John Patterson (Auckland politician) (1855–1923), Auckland city councillor, 1900–1903 and 1908–1911
- Jonathan Patterson, member of Missouri House of Representatives since 2018

== Sports ==
- John W. Patterson (1872–1940), nicknamed Pat, African American baseball player and team manager 1893–1907
- John Patterson (infielder) (born 1967), former Major League infielder
- John Patterson (pitcher) (born 1978), former Major League pitcher
- John Patterson (cricketer) (1860–1943), English cricketer
- Red Patterson (John William Patterson, born 1987), former Major League pitcher

== Other ==
- John Henry Patterson (NCR owner) (1844–1922), founder of the National Cash Register Company
- John Patterson (meteorologist) (1872–1956), director of the Canadian Meteorological Service
- John Thomas Patterson (geneticist) (1878–1960), American geneticist and professor
- John H. Patterson (economist) (1905–?), American economist
- John Patterson (actor) (fl. 1930s), actor in the 1937 film Hotel Haywire
- John Patterson (diplomat) (died 1974), US diplomat murdered in Mexico
- John Patterson (director) (1940–2005), American film and television director
- John Richard Patterson (1945–1997), founder of the Dateline computer-dating company
- John Patterson (screenwriter) (1949-2016), Australian screenwriter, lyricist, playwright and children's author
- Johnny Patterson (1840–1889), Irish singer, songwriter and circus entertainer
- USCGC John Patterson (WPC-1153), the 53rd Sentinel-class cutter
- John Patterson (USCG), namesake of a Sentinel-class cutter

== See also ==
- John Paterson (disambiguation)
- John Henry Patterson (disambiguation)
- Jack Patterson (disambiguation)
