= William Patterson (cricketer, born 1859) =

English cricketer

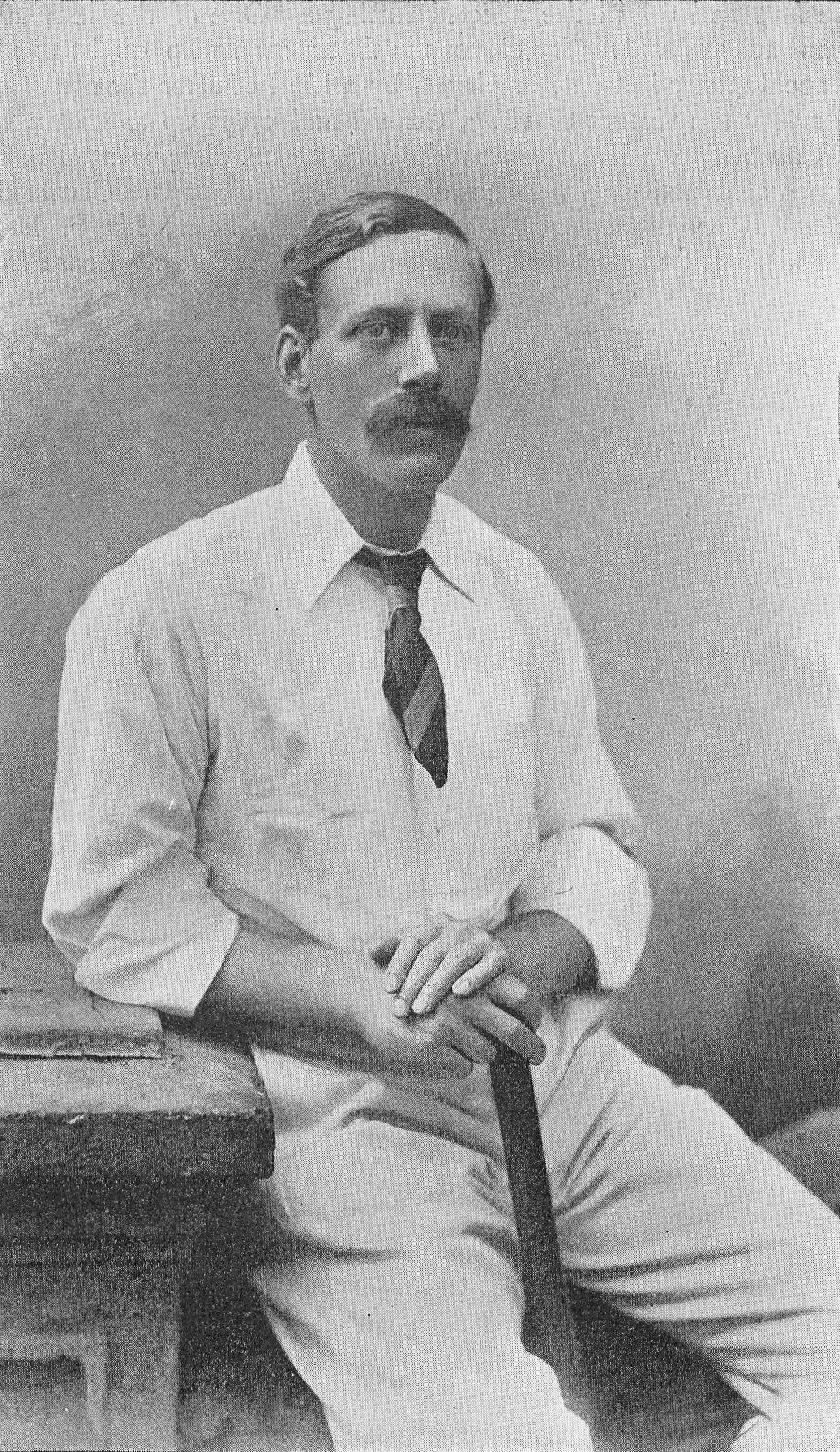

Personal information
- Full name: William Harry Patterson
- Born: 11 March 1859; Royal Military College, Sandhurst, Berkshire
- Died: 3 May 1946 (aged 87); Hove, Sussex
- Batting: Right-handed
- Bowling: Right-arm medium Right-arm slow
- Relatives: John Patterson (brother)

Domestic team information
- Years: Team
- 1878–1881: Oxford University
- 1880–1900: Kent

Career statistics
Competition	First-class
Matches	176
Runs scored	7,570
Batting average	26.28
100s/50s	10/31
Top score	181
Balls bowled	1,738
Wickets	31
Bowling average	33.64
5 wickets in innings	0
10 wickets in match	0
Best bowling	4/13
Catches/stumpings	122/–
- Source: CricInfo, 5 April 2009

William Harry Patterson (11 March 1859 – 3 May 1946) was an English amateur cricketer who played during the latter part of the 19th century.

Patterson was educated at Harrow School and Pembroke College, Oxford. A right-handed batsman who occasionally bowled, he was awarded his cricket Blue at Oxford University in 1880 and 1881. In 1881 he scored a century for Oxford against Cambridge while suffering from a broken finger. He was the joint captain of Kent County Cricket Club between 1890 and 1893.

== Bibliography ==
- Carlaw, Derek (2020). Kent County Cricketers, A to Z: Part One (1806–1914) (PDF). Cardiff: ACS.

Sporting positions
Preceded by Lord Harris	Kent County Cricket Club captain 1890–1893; Jointly with Frank Marchant.	Succeeded by Frank Marchant
