= St Luke's Church, Matfield =

Parish church in the village of Matfield, Kent, England

Coordinates: 51.14298°N 0.36279°E

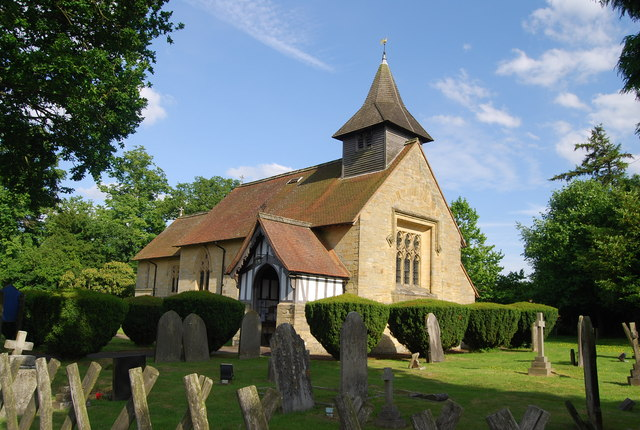

- Location within Kent
- OS grid reference: TQ 65372 40844
- Location: Matfield, Kent
- Country: England
- Denomination: Anglican
- Website: stlukesandstmaryschurches.org/st-lukes

History
- Status: Parish church

Architecture
- Functional status: Active
- Heritage designation: Grade II
- Designated: 24 August 1990
- Completed: 1876

Administration
- Province: Canterbury
- Diocese: Rochester
- Archdeaconry: Tonbridge
- Deanery: Paddock Wood
- Parish: Matfield

St Luke's Church is a parish church in the village of Matfield, Kent, England. It is a Grade II listed building.

The church is dedicated to Luke the Evangelist.

== Building ==
Situated two miles north east of Royal Tunbridge Wells on the B2160, the church is on the southern outskirts of Matfield.

The architect for the building was Basil Champneys. The church remains mostly original, apart from an extension built in 1965.

=== Exterior ===
The short tower at the west end has a steeply pitched roof of typical Kentish style. It contains a single bell, made in London by John Warner and Sons in 1877.

The chancel at the east end is slightly narrower than the nave. On the north side of the chancel is a statue of Saint Luke, on which a garland placed round the neck on his feast day each year.

The church is entered through the prominent porch, in which sandstone gives way to black and white work at waist height. Inside there is a large oak door, which is cut horizontally at the top to form a tympanum.

=== Interior ===
The nave points straight towards the altar, and has a side aisle on the right hand (south) side. The elaborate moulding of the arches between the nave and aisle copies the Early English style of the 13th century. A horizontal tie beam, surmounted by a v-shaped crown post, supports the roof. Its design is based on the medieval one at the church in nearby Brenchley.

=== Altar ===
The current altar was donated by the parishioners in 1927 to commemorate the 50th anniversary of the church.

=== Lectern ===
This is made of brass in the form of an eagle with outstretched wings. It is dedicated to the memory of Katherine Storr, the wife of the first vicar, as inscribed on the sphere under the eagle.

=== Hanging glass sculpture ===
In 1991, a glass sculpture was installed, suspended from the ceiling of the nave. It depicts baptism as the first step to eternal life, and is therefore located close to the font. There is a circular section with red flames, signifying the holiness of God, and below this is water, as used in baptism. The sculpture was designed and engraved by sculptor Jenny Clark from nearby Horsmonden.

The font itself is octagonal, made of similar stone to the rest of the church, and has an oak cover.

=== Organ ===
The organ has two manuals and pedals, with a total of 422 pipes. It was built in 1892, some 16 years after the rest of the church. It was built by F H Brown and Sons of Deal, Kent, using pipes made in Germany. It was given in memory of Elizabeth Marchant, whose family's forebears built Matfield House. In 1974 the organ was extensively renovated, using funds raised by parishioners.

=== Windows ===
The richly tinted stained glass windows were made by the London firm C E Kempe, and were given by the Marchant family in 1893. The ones behind the altar are of nativity scenes, with shepherds on the left and the three kings on the right. The window on the left side of the chancel shows the Angel Gabriel and Mary, and is in memory of Katherine Storr. Towards the rear of the nave, are depictions of St. George and St. Louie. These are in memory of Lieutenant Hugh Marchant, who was killed in 1916.

== History ==
St Luke's Church was built between 1874 and 1876, and opened 1876.

== Burials and memorials ==
There are memorials to many members of the Storr and Marchant families.

The churchyard contains the grave of the sculptor Theresa Sassoon (mother of Siegfried Sassoon, the First World War poet). Mrs Sassoon planted a tree on Matfield green to commemorate the end of World War I; the tree was blown down in the hurricane of 1987 and had to be replaced.

Recently an additional churchyard has been opened some 200 yards along Sophurst Lane, as the original one is full.

== See also ==
- Matfield
- List of churches in Kent
