= Pattyndenne Manor =

Country house in Goudhurst, Kent, England

Coordinates: 51.09751°N 0.45506°E

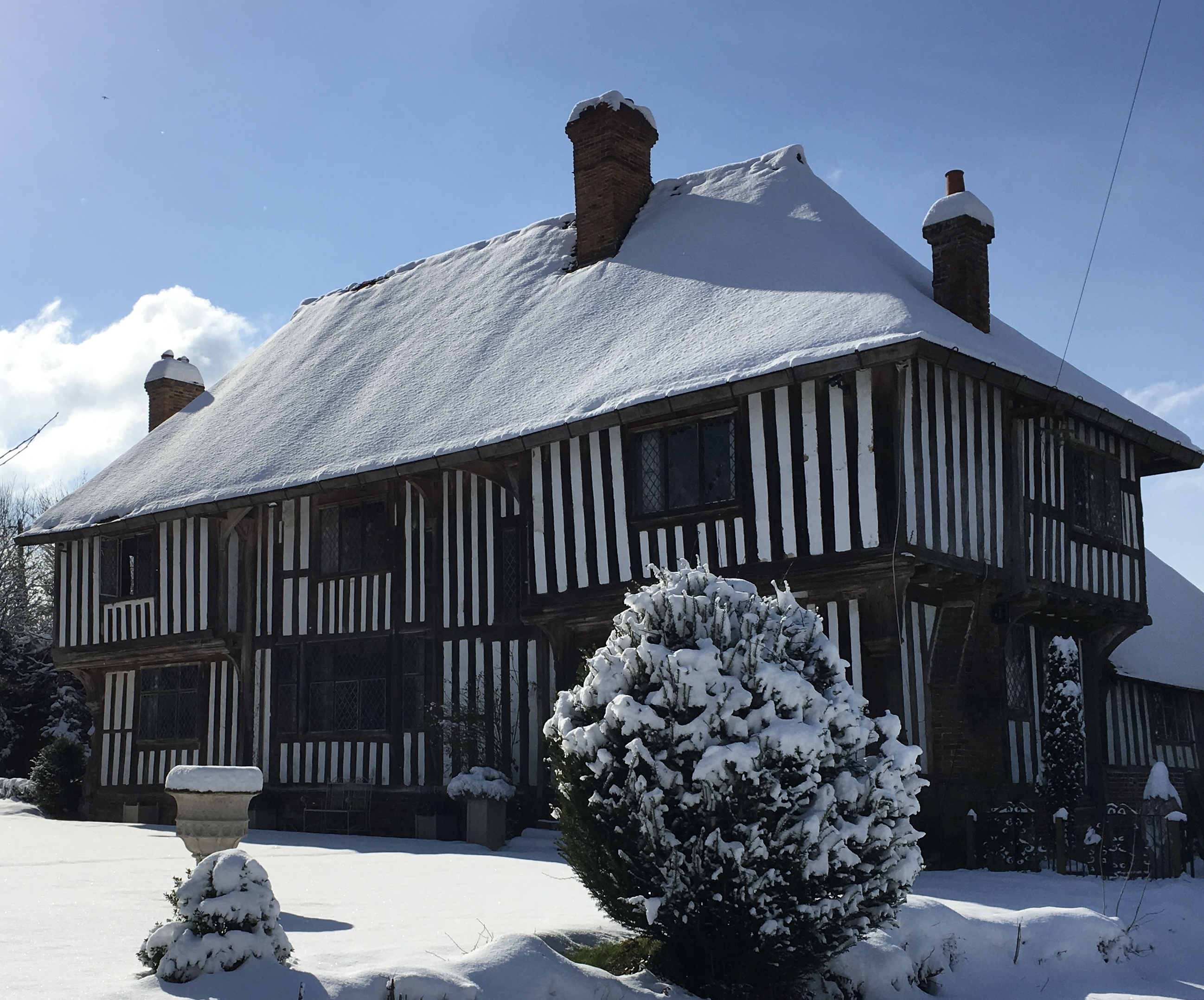
Pattyndenne Manor

Pattyndenne Manor is a Grade II* listed manor house located near to the village of Goudhurst, Kent. (grid reference TQ7236)

== History ==
This Grade II* listed timber framed house was built by the Pattyndenn family in 1472, it was a home and a place to hold the Manor court proceedings. In the 16th century it was sold to Sir Maurice Berkeley, son of Lord Berkeley and a Standard-bearer to Henry VIII, Mary Tudor and Elizabeth I.

== Structure ==
The house is built in the local style known as Wealden, in which parts of the upper storey and sides project as jetties, but the central part, has no jetties and thus gives the appearance of being recessed. The central part contains the hall, which would originally have been open to the roof. At Pattydenne the upper storey rests on four moulded and chamfered corner posts and the jetties project from all four sides. The layout of the house remains largely unchanged, except for the addition of a kitchen wing in around 1600. In 1890 an extension was added to accommodate a new staircase.

The house contains a banqueting hall and a 13th-century prison.

== Visiting ==
The house is privately owned and not open to the public.
