= Wealden hall house =

Type of medieval English house

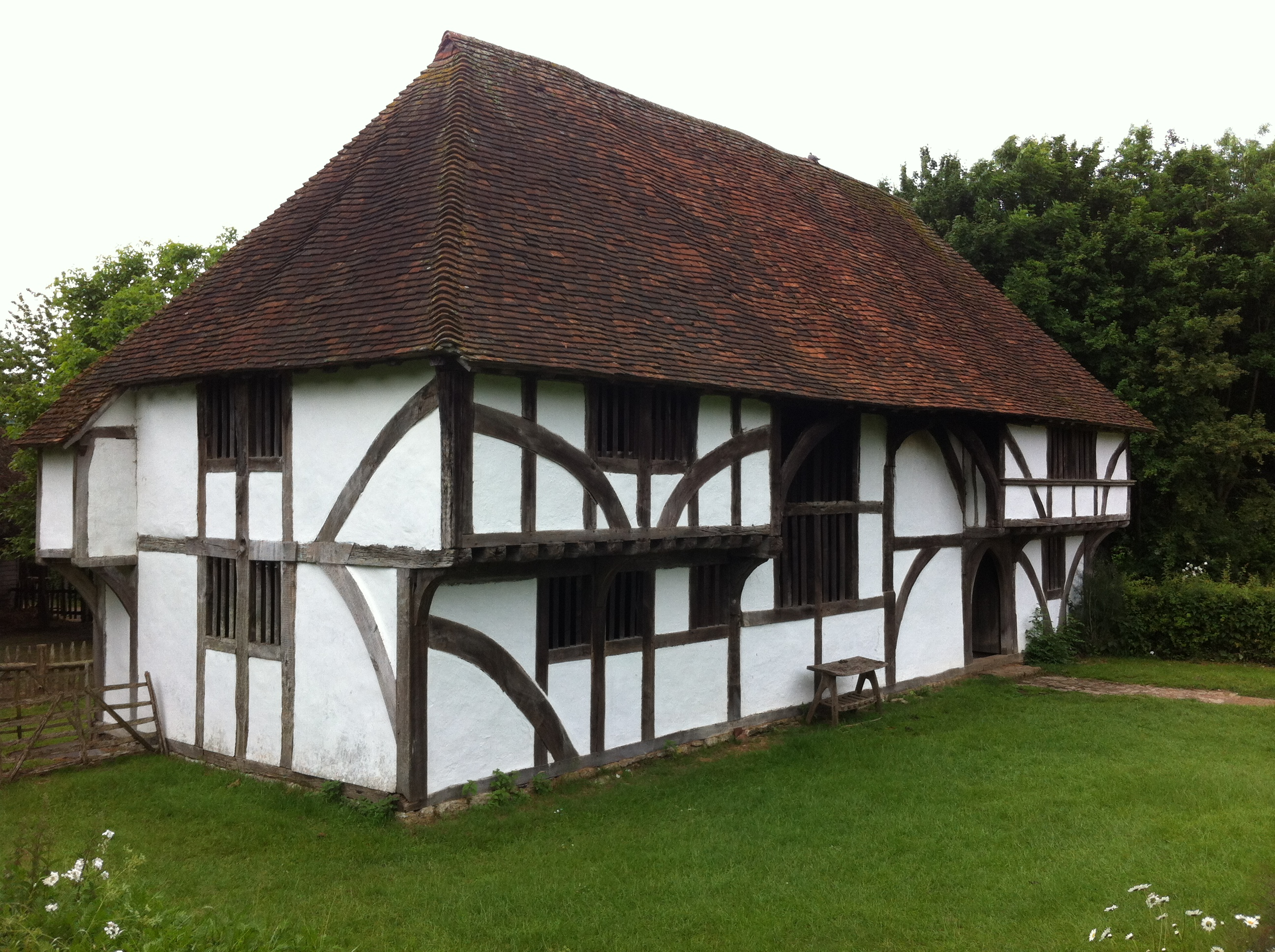
Bayleaf, a reconstructed Wealden house

The Bayleaf house being dismantled, winter 1968–69. The left section is already missing; note on the right side the jettied upper floor and in the hall section the chimney stack behind the entrance door blocking the cross passage.

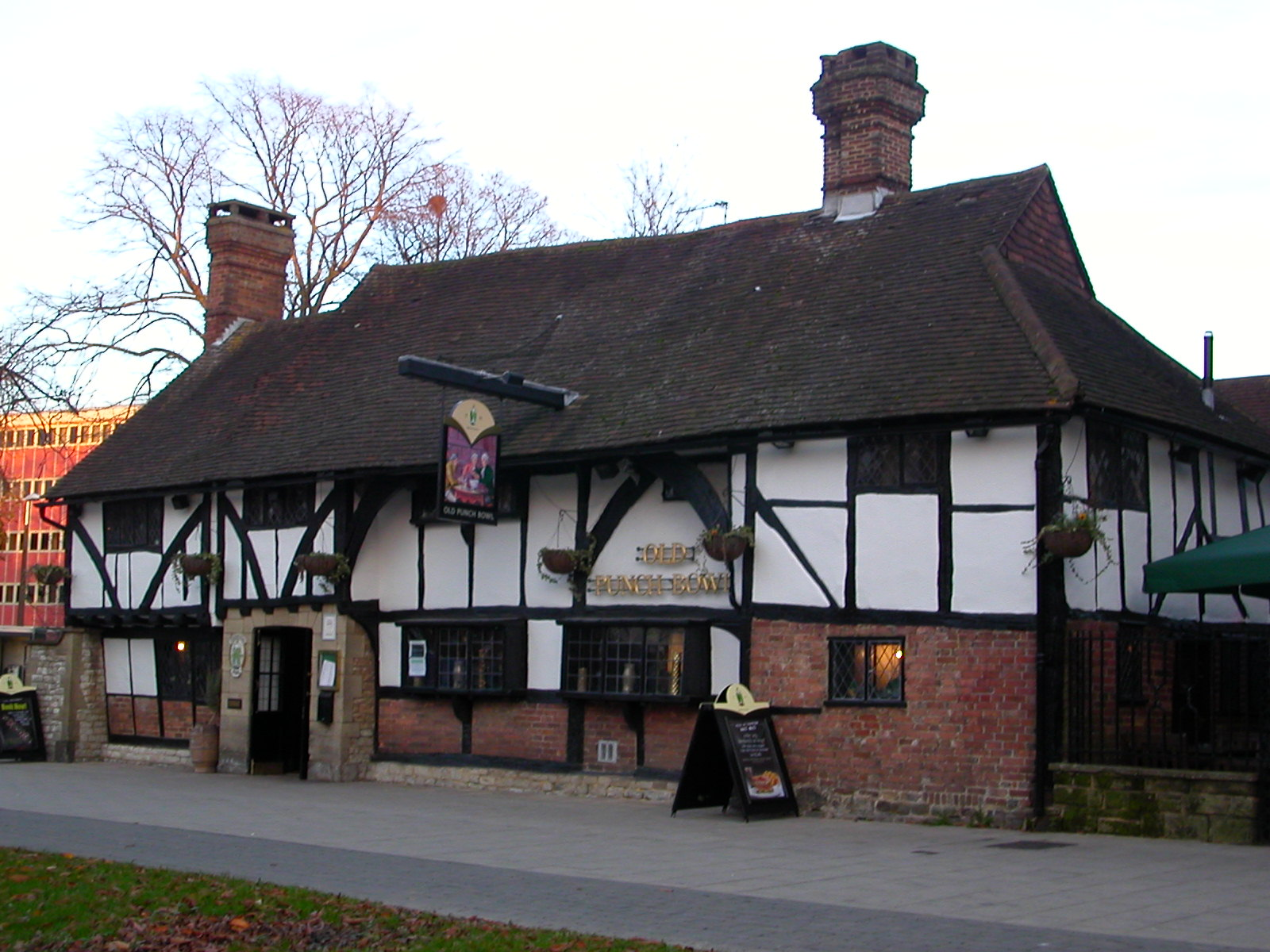
The Old Punch Bowl, Crawley, West Sussex. Parts of the lower wall on the right have been completely replaced with bricks and the jettied upper floor is only visible on the left end.

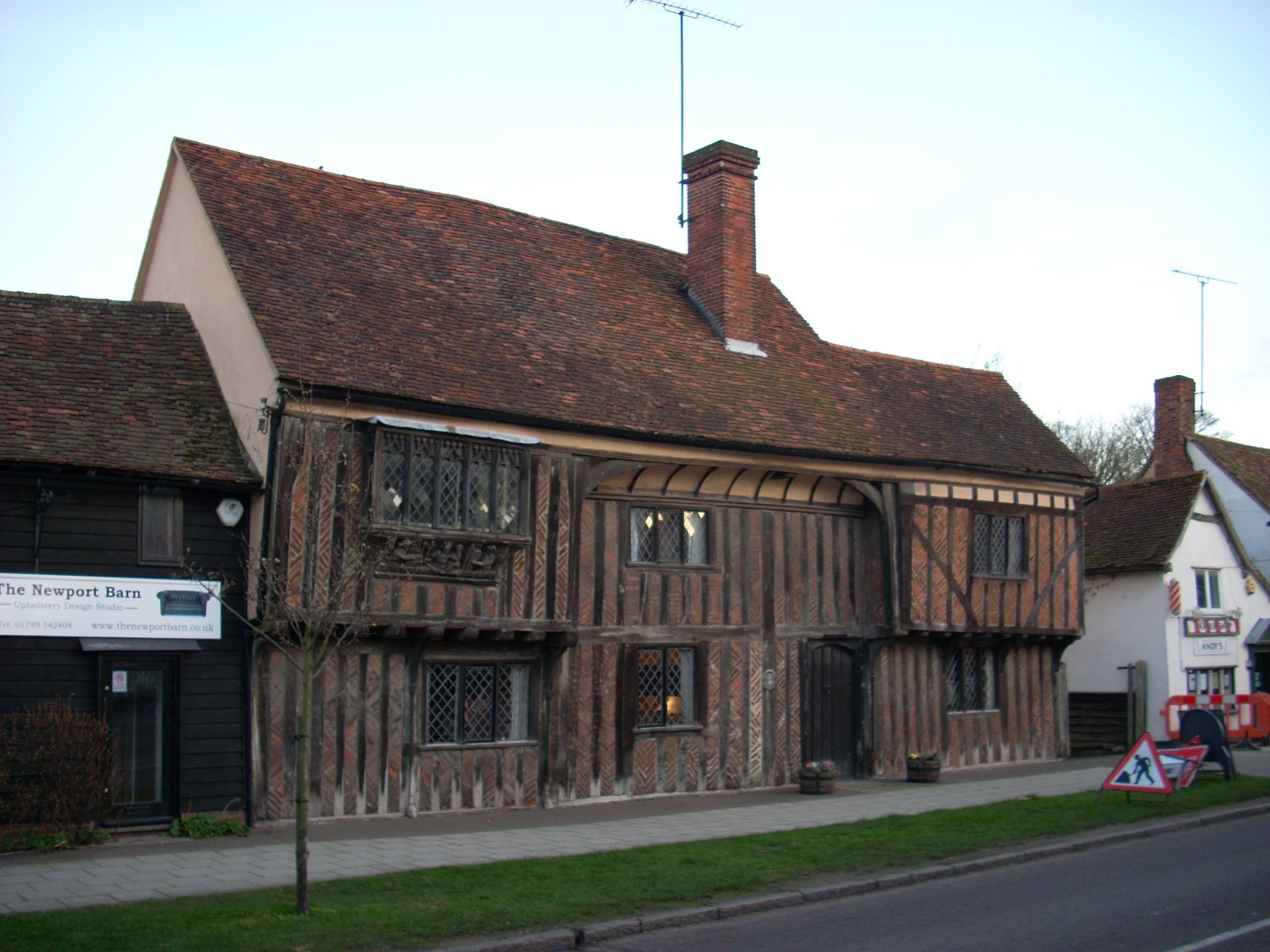
Monks' Barn, Newport, Essex, showing a brick filling in herringbone pattern

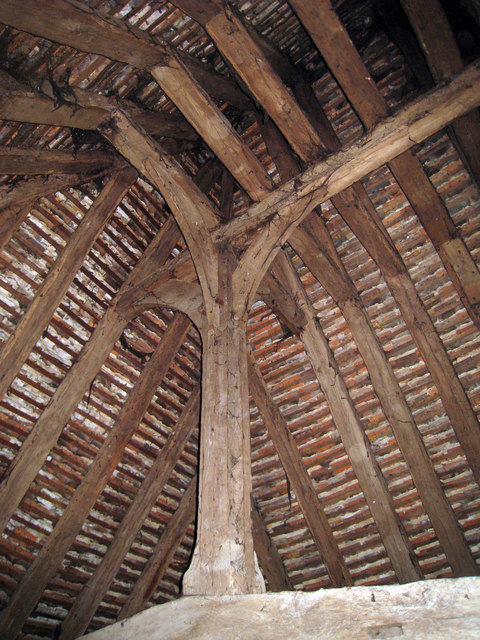
The crown post roof over the chamber of Bayleaf

The Wealden hall house is a type of vernacular medieval timber-framed hall house traditional in the south east of England. Typically built for a yeoman, it is most common in Kent (hence "Wealden" for the once densely forested Weald) and the east of Sussex but has also been built elsewhere. Kent has one of the highest concentrations of such surviving medieval timber-framed buildings.

The original floor plan usually had four bays with the two central ones forming the main hall open to the roof with the hearth in the middle and two doors to the outside at one end forming a cross passage. The open hearth was later moved towards the cross passage and became a fireplace with chimney, sometimes the chimney pile even blocking the cross passage, which had soon been screened off the main hall. Beyond the cross passage the outer bay at the "screens end" or "lower end" of the hall, usually contained two rooms commonly called buttery and pantry, while the rooms in the bay at the other end, the "upper end", were called parlours. The end bays each had an upper floor containing solars, which did not communicate with each other, as the hall rose to the rafters between them. The upper stories on both ends typically extended beyond the lower outer wall being jettied on at least one side of the building. As the main hall had no upper floor the outer wall ran straight up without jettying, and thus the central bays appeared recessed. Where space was restricted in towns, a 'half-Wealden' may be built, with only one jettied end. In the 16th and 17th centuries, the open hall fell out of favour, and most Wealden houses had an intermediate floor and fireplace inserted.

The early buildings had thatched roofs and walls of wattle and daub often whitewashed. Later buildings would have a brick infilling between timbers, sometimes leading to a complete replacement of the outer walls of the basement with solid stone walls.

== Examples ==
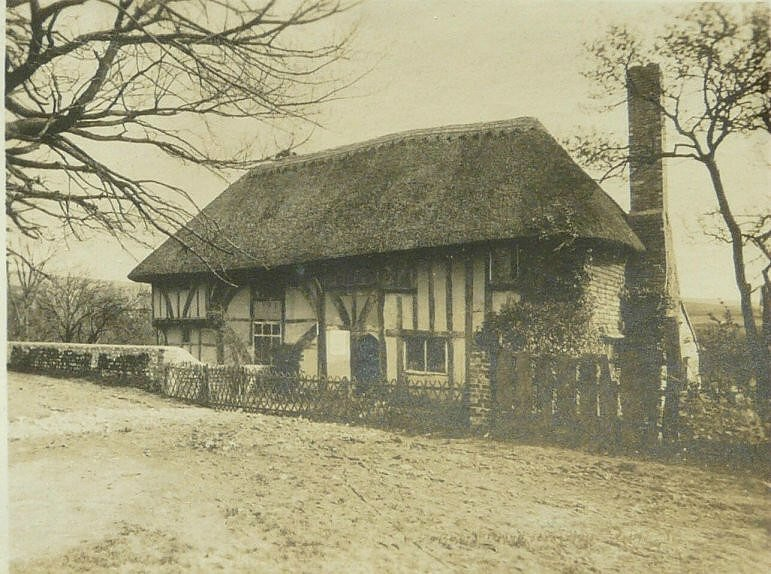
Alfriston Clergy House in 1926

Examples are the "Bayleaf farmhouse" from Chiddingstone, relocated in 1968–69 to the Weald and Downland Open Air Museum, the Yeoman's House in Bignor, the Anne of Cleves House in Lewes, the Alfriston Clergy House, the Plough at Stalisfield Green, the Old Punch Bowl and the Ancient Priors at Crawley, the Pattyndenne Manor in Kent and the Monks' Barn in Newport, Essex, Hole Cottage near Cowden (operated by Landmark Trust) and The Old Bakery, in Hamstreet, Kent. The northernmost examples are in York, and include the Wealden Hall on Goodramgate.
