= John Henry Patterson =

John Henry Patterson may refer to:

- John Henry Patterson (American soldier) (1843–1920), Union soldier during the American Civil War and recipient of the Medal of Honor
- John Henry Patterson (author) (1867–1947), Anglo-Irish soldier who wrote The Man-Eaters of Tsavo which was made into the film The Ghost and the Darkness in 1996
- John Henry Patterson (NCR owner) (1844–1922), founder and first owner of the National Cash Register Company

== See also ==
- John Patterson (disambiguation)
