= Frank Marchant =

English Amateur Cricketer and Former Captain of Kent County Cricket Club

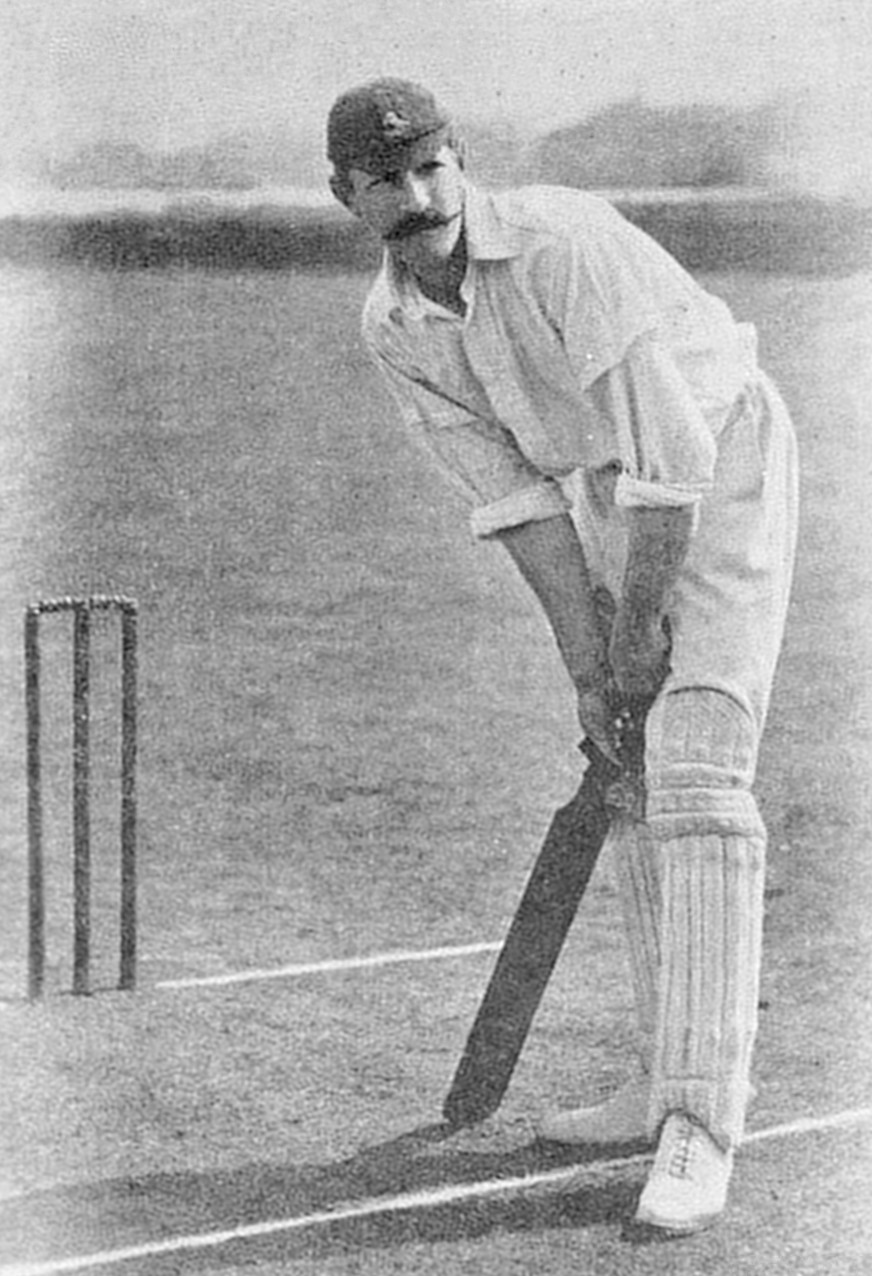
- Marchant in 1896

Personal information
- Full name: Francis Marchant
- Born: 22 May 1864; Matfield House, Matfield, Kent
- Died: 13 April 1946 (aged 81); Roehampton, London
- Batting: Right-handed

Domestic team information
- Years: Team
- 1883–1905: Kent
- 1884–1887: Cambridge University
- 1890–1896: Marylebone Cricket Club
- FC debut: 20 August 1883 Kent v Lancashire
- Last FC: 19 June 1905 Kent v Sussex

Career statistics
Competition	First-class
Matches	267
Runs scored	9,124
Batting average	20.97
100s/50s	8/38
Top score	176
Balls bowled	965
Wickets	20
Bowling average	30.45
5 wickets in innings	0
10 wickets in match	0
Best bowling	2/11
Catches/stumpings	130/0
- Source: CrinInfo, 11 March 2017

Francis Marchant (22 May 1864 – 13 April 1946), known as Frank Marchant, was an English amateur cricketer. He was a right-handed batsman, an occasional wicket-keeper and the captain of Kent County Cricket Club from 1890 to 1897.

== Early life ==
Marchant was born at Matfield House in Matfield, Kent, the fourth son of Stephen Marchant. After a term at Rugby School, he was educated at Eton College and Trinity College, Cambridge. He played cricket at both, winning a cricket Blue each season from 1884 to 1887 and a Blue in football in 1885 and 1886. He captained the Cambridge team in his final year there.

== Cricket ==
Marchant made his first-class cricket debut in August 1883 after finishing at Eton and before going up to Cambridge. Lord Harris, the most influential figure in Kent cricket at the time, had happened to ask Marchant if he was eligible to play for Kent during a break in play at the Eton v Harrow match at Lord's earlier in the summer, during which Marchant had scored 93 runs in a "delightful display" of batting. He played twice for Kent in that summer, making his debut against Lancashire at Gravesend. He went on to play for both Kent and Cambridge over the next four seasons, winning his cricket Blue as a freshman in 1884 and his county cap the following season. His Wisden obituary said that he was "rather disappointing for a player of such promise" at Cambridge but went on to do "some great things for Kent" in county cricket.

Marchant went on to appear regularly for Kent until 1898, playing in 226 first-class matches for the county team as well as making 32 appearances for Cambridge. He scored seven of his eight centuries for Kent, including his highest score of 176 made against Sussex at Gravesend in 1889. This was his maiden century and saw him score over 100 runs before lunch. In 1896 came close to scoring centuries in both innings of a match against Yorkshire. He has been described as being "a brilliant hitter in front of the wicket, especially on the leg side" and a "brilliant and stylish batsman". Writing in Wisden in 1907, George Marsham was of the opinion that he "should prefer to watch an innings of his when in his best form to that of any other batsman of his time" and described Marchant as "a magnificent field" and "a brilliant but uncertain batsman".

From 1890 to 1893 Marchant captained the Kent team during the first half of each season, William Patterson taking over the captaincy during his summer holidays, his profession as a solicitor making it impossible for him to play a whole season. Kent's fortunes at the time were mixed and after a successful first season captaining together, during which the touring Australians were beaten at Canterbury, 1891 was "one of the worst in the club's history". Between 1894 and 1897 Marchant captained the team alone before resigning as captain after a disappointing season in 1897 when he was rarely able to field the best Kent XI, Jack Mason taking over with Marchant continuing to play regularly in 1898 and 1899. After not playing at all in 1900, he played eight matches in each of 1901 and 1902 and then just three more before his final match in 1905.

As well as matches for Kent and Cambridge, Marchant played six times for MCC, including in one match against the touring Australian team in 1893 when he scored 103 runs, an innings which Wisden called "most famous performance". He played for the Gentlemen against the Players just once, in 1887, and made occasional appearances for other first-class teams. In club cricket he played for amateur teams such as Band of Brothers, a team closely associated with Kent, Eton Ramblers, I Zingari and Free Foresters.

== Personal life ==
Marchant was President of Kent County Cricket Club in 1934 and professionally was a director of Saunders and Co, a paper making company. He was married to Torfrida Marchant. He died in 1946 at the age of 82 at Roehampton in London and was buried at Hayes in Kent.

Sporting positions
Preceded by Lord Harris	Kent County Cricket Club captain 1890–1897; Joint captain with W.H.Patterson until 1893.	Succeeded by Jack Mason
