= Jack Patterson (footballer) =

Australian rules footballer

Jack Paterson

Personal information
- Full name: John Southey Paterson
- Born: 27 May 1908; Ballarat, Victoria
- Died: 29 December 1987 (aged 79); Cheltenham, Victoria
- Height: 165 cm (5 ft 5 in)
- Weight: 66 kg (146 lb)

Playing career^{1}
Years	Club	Games (Goals)
1931	South Melbourne (VFL)	14 (14)
1932, 1934–1935	North Melbourne (VFL)	31 (27)
1936–1940	Williamstown (VFA)	77 (107)
Total		122 (148)
- ^{1} Playing statistics correct to the end of 1940.

John Southey Paterson (27 May 1908 – 29 December 1987) was an Australian rules footballer who played with South Melbourne and North Melbourne in the Victorian Football League (VFL).

== Family ==
The son of George Richard Paterson (1874-1949), and Mary Ellen Paterson (1883-1956), née Nice, John Southey Paterson was born at Ballarat, Victoria on 27 May 1908. He married Hermena Louisa Rose Faber (1914-1992) in 1936.

== Football ==
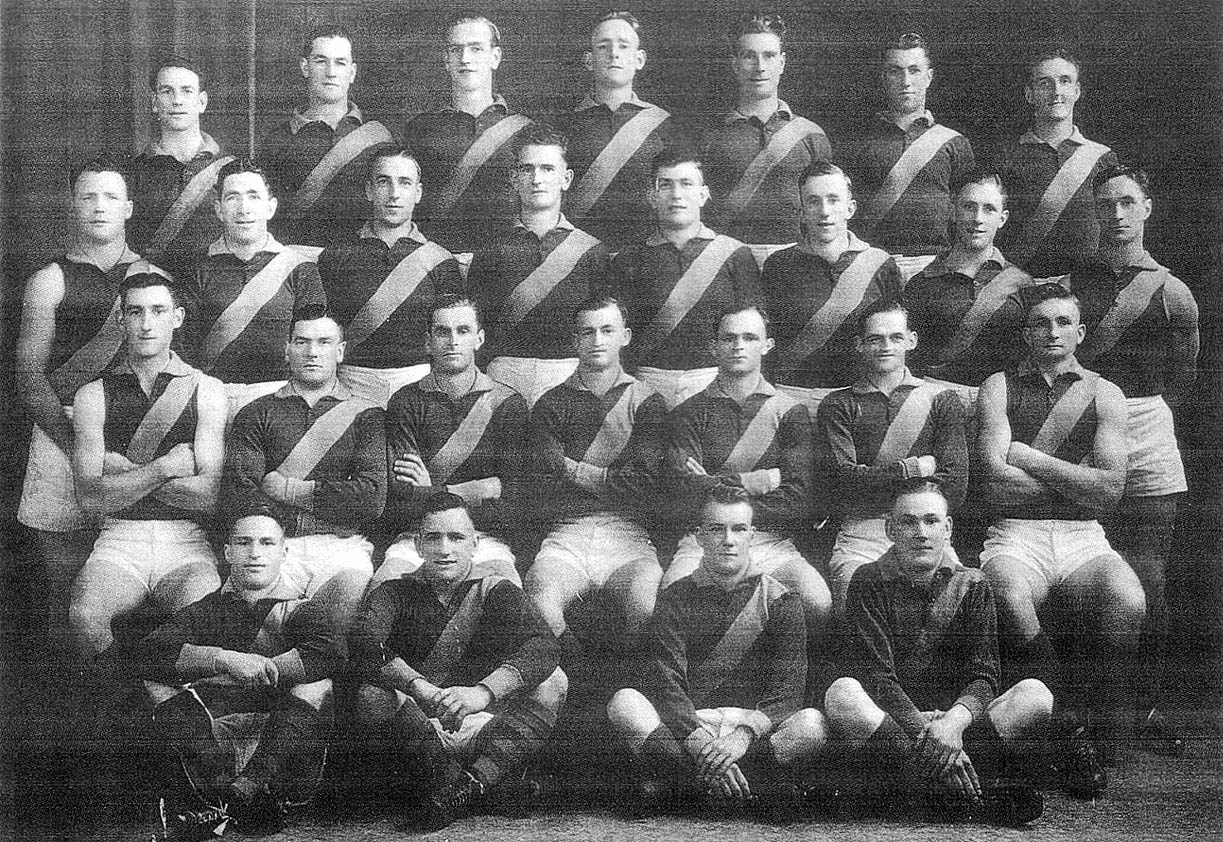
Williamstown's 1939 VFA Premiership team. Jack Patterson is second from left, front row.

Note that most of his official football records, and most of the press reports relating to his football career have his family name as Patterson (with two t's).

No one impressed more this morning [at South Melbourne's first practice match of the season] than Patterson, a nuggetty boy from the second eighteen. He is game, determined, marks well; and kicks nicely and plays on all the time. He has an elusive turn, and looks the goods. Provided he kicks the ball as soon as possible, he may be a distinct acquisition." — Jumbo Sharland, 4 April 1931.

=== South Melbourne (VFL) ===
Recruited from the South Melbourne Seconds, he played in 14 games (14 goals) for South Melbourne in 1931.

=== North Melbourne (VFL) ===
Cleared from South Melbourne to North Melbourne on 11 May 1932, he played in 31 games (27 goals) for North Melbourne from 1932 to 1935 — a broken ankle meant that he did not play at all in 1933.

=== Williamstown (VFA) ===
Paterson was cleared from North Melbourne to Williamstown on 1 May 1936. He played in 77 games (109 goals) for Williamstown over 5 seasons (1936 to 1940). He was first rover in the 1939 premiership team, runner-up in the team's best and fairest award 1939, its leading goalkicker in 1938 (31 goals), its best clubman in 1937, and its most consistent player in 1936.

== Death ==
Paterson died at Cheltenham, Victoria on 27 December 1987, aged 79.
