= John M. K. Paterson =

Scottish minister

John M. K. Paterson (8 October 1922 – 6 August 2009) was a Scottish minister. He served as Moderator of the General Assembly of the Church of Scotland in 1984.

== Life ==
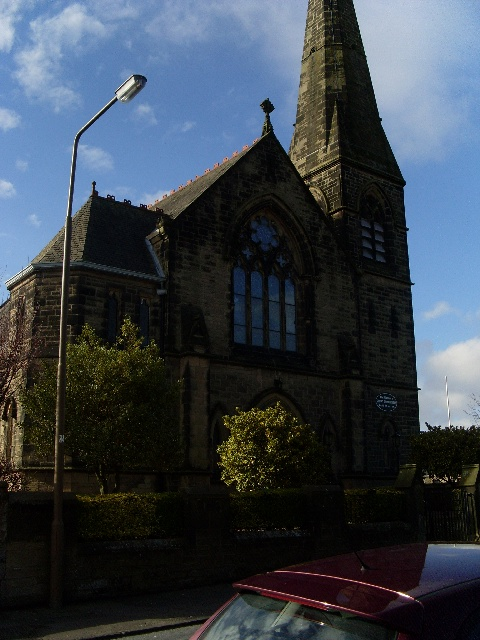
St John's Church, Bathgate

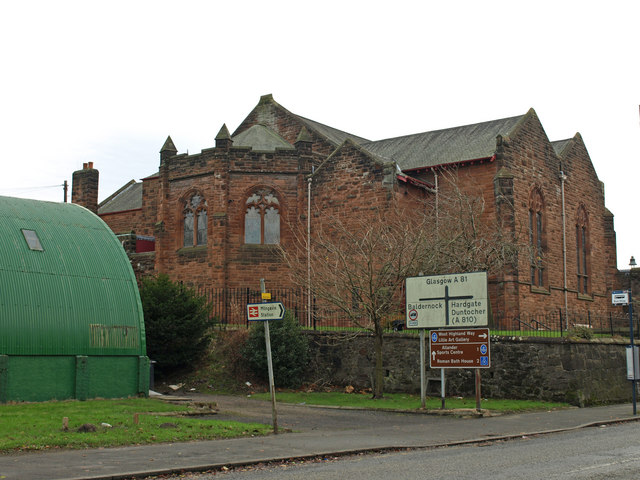
St Paul's, Milngavie

He was born in Leeds on 8 October 1922 to Scottish parents who returned to Scotland in his childhood. He was educated at Hillhead High School in Glasgow. In the Second World War he served as a fighter pilot with the RAF. After the war he trained in insurance and worked in East Africa.

In 1958 he heard Very Rev David Steel preach in Nairobi and was inspired to join the ministry. He returned to Scotland to study divinity at the University of Edinburgh. His first role was as assistant to Rev Leonard Small at St Cuthbert's Church, Edinburgh. In 1964 he was ordained and served as minister of St John's in Bathgate. In 1970 he was transferred to St Paul's in Milngavie and remained there until his retirement in 1987.

In 1984 he replaced Very Rev Fraser McLuskey as Moderator. He was succeeded in turn by Very Rev David Smith.

In 1986 he chaired a committee looking at ethics in the world of investment and banking. This advocated boycotting companies which invested in South Africa (then still under apartheid rule). The University of Aberdeen awarded him an honorary doctorate (DD) later that year.

On retirement, he moved to Edinburgh and joined the congregation of St Giles. He died peacefully, following a brief illness, in Edinburgh on 6 August 2009 aged 86. A memorial service was held in St Giles Cathedral on 14 August 2009.

== Family ==
In 1946 he married Jill and together they had three children.
