= John Patterson (cricketer) =

English cricketer and clergyman

Reverend John Irwin Patterson (11 March 1860 – 22 September 1943) was an English clergyman and amateur cricketer who played in six first-class cricket matches for Kent County Cricket Club between 1881 and 1882.

Patterson was born at the Royal Military College, Sandhurst in Berkshire in 1860, the son of Colonel William Patterson. He was educated at Chatham House Grammar School in Ramsgate before going up to Pembroke College, Oxford. He played for Kent in 1881 and 1882 primarily as a slow left-arm bowler, and played in the University Match in 1882, winning his Blue for Oxford. After graduating in 1882 he entered the Church of England, acting as a curate in Chatham between 1883 and 1887, Camberley from 1887 to 1888 and in Bournemouth from 1889.

He was the younger brother of William Patterson who captained Kent between 1890 and 1893. Patterson died at Woking in Surrey in 1943 aged 83.

== Bibliography ==
- Carlaw, Derek (2020). Kent County Cricketers, A to Z: Part One (1806–1914) (PDF). Cardiff: ACS.
