= Jack Paterson (footballer) =

Australian rules footballer, born 1900

Personal information
- Full name: John Black Paterson
- Born: 6 December 1900; Boort, Victoria
- Died: 30 November 1975 (aged 74); Geelong, Victoria
- Original team: Geelong College
- Height: 180 cm (5 ft 11 in)
- Weight: 78 kg (172 lb)

Playing career^{1}
Years	Club	Games (Goals)
1920, 1924–26	Geelong	23 (10)
- ^{1} Playing statistics correct to the end of 1926.

John Black Paterson (6 December 1900 – 30 November 1975) was an Australian rules footballer who played with Geelong in the Victorian Football League (VFL).

== Family ==
The son of Robert Sturrock Paterson (1860–1938), and Isabelle Paterson, née Ison (1863–1942), John Black Paterson was born at Boort, Victoria on 6 December 1900.

He married Isabella May James (1902–1938) on 23 October 1929. They were divorced in 1936. He married Bernice Irma Dinse (1910–1970) in 1939.

== Football ==
He played at centre half-forward in the Geelong Second XVIII team that won the 1923 Seconds' premiership, defeating Richmond, 9.12 (66) to 5.10 (40).

== Military service ==
Paterson later served in the Australian Army during World War II. He was taken prisoner of war during fighting in Greece in 1941, and was held at Oflag VII-B in Eichstätt in Germany.
