= Matfield House =

House in Matfield, Kent, England

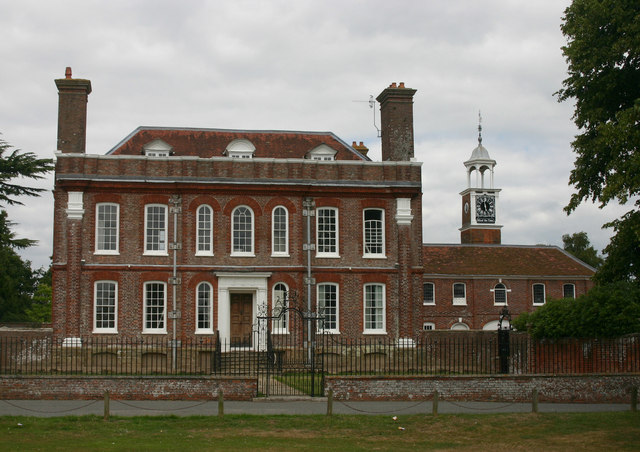
- Matfield House and Stables

- Location within the United Kingdom

General information
- Location: Matfield, England
- Coordinates: 51°09′09″N 0°22′10″E

Design and construction
- Designations

Listed Building – Grade I
- Official name: Matfield House
- Designated: 20 Oct 1954
- Reference no.: 1250644

Matfield House is a Grade I listed Georgian house in the village of Matfield, Kent, England.

The house was built in 1728 in the Queen Anne style for Thomas Marchant, a yeoman farmer from Horsmonden and his heiress wife Mary. It is constructed in two storeys of pink and red brick in Flemish bond overlooking the Matfield village green.

The associated stable block is also Grade I listed. One of a group of buildings forming a stable courtyard, it is surmounted by an impressive clock turret and cupola. The other stable building is listed Grade II*, as is the coachhouse and the nearby Matfield House Cottages.

The cricketer Frank Marchant, captain of Kent County Cricket Club from 1890 until 1897, was born in the house in 1864.
