= Jack Paterson (actor) =

Canadian director, dramaturg and actor (born 1974)

- Born: John Paterson; May 25, 1974 (age 52); Vancouver, British Columbia, Canada
- Occupations: Director, dramaturg, actor, coach
- Website: www.jackpatersontheatre.com

John Paterson (born May 25, 1974) is a Canadian director, devisor, dramaturg, translator, actor and theatre creator who works across Canada, the United Kingdom, and internationally. His favourite credits include directing the installation of The List (BoucheWHACKED!), the site-specific The Women of Troy (Canadian Stage) and F. Garcia Lorca’s The Love of Don Perlimplin for Belisa (Shaw Festival); production dramaturgy on the English language premiere of H. Muller’s Macbeth: nach Shakespeare; and playing Adolf Hitler and Walt Disney in The Blue Light (Firehall Arts Centre) and Scheffler in The Ugly One (Plan B Collective).

He is the founder of multi-award-winning Mad Duck Theatre Collective for whom he adapted and directed Coriolanus, the Vancouver premieres of Shakespeare's R&J and Titus Andronicus, Julius Caesar and Vancouver's first female Prospero in The Tempest. Other directing credits include The Hobbit and The Odyssey (Carousel Theatre) and Banana Boys Firehall Arts Centre. A graduate of Circle in the Square (NYC), he has performed with The Arts Club, Chemainus Theatre and as a regular performer in Savage God’s The Shakespeare Projects.

Jack has recently completed a series of Artistic Director Residencies with the mandate of Three Provinces, Three Companies and Three Mandates with Playwrights’ Workshop Montreal (Quebec), Theatre Conspiracy (B.C.) and The Magnetic North Theatre Festival (Ontario/Alberta). He is currently the Co-Artistic Producer of BoucheWHACKED! and the West Coast Ambassador for Playwrights Workshop Montreal. His work has been nominated for over twenty-five Jessie Richardson Awards including four for Outstanding Direction and two for Outstanding Production. He is the recipient of the Ray Michal Outstanding Body of Work by an Emerging Director Award.

== Selected Directing ==
Selected Directing Credits: Classical

- The Women of Troy, Canadian Stage: Festival of Ideas
- The Love of Don Perlimplin for Belisa in his Garden, Shaw Festival
- Coriolanus*, Mad Duck Theatre Collective
- Shakespeare's R & J*, Mad Duck Theatre Collective
- Titus Andronicus*, Mad Duck Theatre Collective
- Julius Caesar *, Mad Duck Theatre Collective
- Henry 6 Parts 2 & 3, Savage God: Shakespeare Project
- The Tempest*, Mad Duck Theatre Collective
- A Midsummer Night's Dream, Mad Duck Theatre Collective
- Macbeth, Square Pegs Theatre

Selected Directing Credits: Contemporary

- The Pitmen Painters, United Players (Vancouver, Canada)
- The Love of Don Perlimplin for Bellisa in his Garden, The Shaw Festival (Niagara on the Lake, Canada)
- Hosanna, Saving Metropolis Collective (Vancouver, Canada)
- A Moon for the Misbegotten, United Players (Vancouver, Canada)
- The Real Inspector Hound, The Presentation House Theatre (Vancouver, Canada)
- Not About Nightingales (Staged Reading), Mad Duck Theatre Collective (Vancouver, Canada)

Selected Directing Credits: New Works and Translations

- The List, BoucheWHACKED! Theatre Collective
- Wet, Workhorse Theatre
- The Centre of Everything Civilized, Winterbird Arts
- Rock Me Sweet, Passe Muraille: Buzz Festival
- Out Like Flynn, Fugue Free Theatre
- Banana Boys, Firehall Arts Center
- Suddenly, Useless Shoe's Co-op
- The Unbreakable Popsicle Stick Gang, One Crazy French Man Pro.
- The Love I Made to the Man with No Legs, Walking Fish Festival

Selected Directing Credits: TYA

- The Hobbit*, Carousel Theatre
- The Odyssey*, Carousel Theatre

Selected Directing Credits: Modern Classics

- Hosanna, Saving Metropolis Collective
- Moon for the Misbegotten, United Players
- The Real Inspector Hound, Esdecy Arts & Presentation House

Non Theatre or Cross-Disciplinary:

- Molino Rouge, Stage Director Created and Choreographed by Karen Flamenco
- Wreckage, Contributing Director Created and Choreographed by Nita Bowerman

Staged Readings:

- Howl Red, BoucheWHACKED! Theatre Collective
- Encore, BoucheWHACKED! Theatre Collective
- Unstuck, Foundry Theatre
- Suicide Corporation, Firehall Arts Centre: BC Buds
- Selling Radio, Construction Inc.
- Not About Nightingales, Mad Duck Theatre Collective
- The Tempest, Silly Billyz Workshop Series (NYC)
- Merchant of Venice, Silly Billyz Workshop Series (NYC)
- Two Gentlemen of Verona, Silly Billyz Workshop Series (NYC)
- The Winter's Tale, Silly Billyz Workshop Series (NYC)
- Loves Labor's Lost, Silly Billyz Workshop Series (NYC)
- As You Like It, Silly Billyz Workshop Series (NYC)
- Measure for Measure, Silly Billyz Workshop Series (NYC)

Youth and Outreach Programs:

- Daily Mischief, Richmond Gateway Theatre Academy
- High School Musical, Richmond Gateway Theatre Academy
- Straga Nona, Arts Umbrella, Strathcona Outreach
- As You like It, Carousel Theatre Teen Shakespeare Program
- Romeo and Juliet, Carousel Theatre Teen Shakespeare Program
- Much Ado About Nothing, Carousel Theatre Teen Shakespeare Program
- Comedy of Errors, Carousel Theatre Teen Shakespeare Program

Selected Assistant Directing Credits:

- Champ de Mars, Imago Theatre: Micheline Chevrier
- Don Quixote, Arts Club, Axis Theatre & The Centaur Theatre: Roy Surette
- Schwartz's The Musical workshop, The Centaur Theatre: Roy Surette
- The Canterville Ghost workshop, Shaw Festival: Jackie Maxwell
- The Devil's Disciple, The Shaw Festival: Tadeusz Bradecki
- In Good King Charles's Golden Days, The Shaw Festival: Eda Holmes
- The Amorous Adventures of Anatol, The Playhouse: Morris Panych
- Loves Labor's Lost, Savage God: John Juliani
- A Midsommer Night's Dream, Savage God: John Juliani

== Selected Dramaturgy ==
Workshop and Production Dramaturg:

- Macbeth: nach Shakespeare by Heiner Muller, translated by Carl Weber

Theatre Conspiracy/ Gas Heart - English Language Premiere

Selected Development Workshops:

- Intrusion, Screaming Locomotive: Emerging Playwrights
- Sanctuaire by Lucia Frangione, Screaming Locomotive
- Two Part Invention by Dorothy Dittrich, Screaming Locomotive
- Unstuck by Evan Tsitsias, Foundry Theatre
- Galatea by Lawrence Aronovitch, Screaming Weenie: Clean Sheets

Playwrights’ Workshop Montreal, Associate Dramaturg:

- Sal Capone by Omari Newton (w Urban Ink & Black Theatre Workshop)
- Four Minutes if You Bleed by Alexandria Haber & Ned Cox
- Concordia 10 Minute Plays by Various
- Strange Land by Alexis Diamond
- Members of the Band by Lionel Siegel

PWM Translation Workshops:

- THE POSTER by Philippe Ducros, translated by Shelley Tepperman
- The Carrousel by Jennifer Tremblay, translated by Shelley Tepperman

Currently:

- West Coast Representative, Playwrights’ Workshop Montreal

== Selected Theatre Performances ==
- The Blue Light - Adolf Hitler/ Walt Disney (The Firehall Arts Centre/Donna Spencer)
- The Oresteia: The Agamemnon - The Chorus (PAL Benefit/ [Torquil Campbell)
- Spice of Life 4 - Cumin/ Curry (Husky Guy.& Novus Pro/ Maryth Gilroy)
- The Party - Hitler in a Dress (One Crazy French Man/ Jacques Lalonde)
- Tis Pity She's a Whore - Soranzo (Ensemble Theatre/ Tariq Leslie)
- The Rivals - Bob Acres (Restoration Project/ Bill Millerd)
- A Streetcar Named Desire (play)|A Streetcar Named Desire - Pablo/ Ensemble (Chemainus Theatre Festival/ Jeremy Tow)
- Of Mice & Men - Slim (Mice & Men-Tors Equity Co-op/ Bert Steinmanis)
- Othello - Ensemble (The Arts Club Theatre/ John Cooper)

== Awards and nominations ==
Recipient of:

- The Ray Michal Award for Outstanding Body of Work by an Emerging Director
- The Cole Foundation Award for Emerging Translators, KIWI
- The John Moffat & Larry Lillo Award.

Jessie Richardson Award Nominations:

- Outstanding Direction: Walt Whitman's Secret
- Outstanding Creation: Direction (The Odyssey)
- Outstanding Direction: Shakespeare's R&J
- Outstanding Direction: Titus Andronicus
- Outstanding Direction: Julius Caesar Outstanding Production: Walt Whitman's Secret
- Outstanding Production: The Hobbit
- Outstanding Production: The Odyssey

Walt Whitman's Secret 6 Jessie Richardson Award Nominations

The List Critic's Pick: Theatre of the Year, The Courier

The Hobbit

- 4 Jessie Richardson Award Nominations including Outstanding Production, TYA

The Odyssey

- Winner – Jessie Richardson Award for Outstanding Production, TYA
- 7 Jessie Richardson Award Nominations

Shakespeare's R&J

- Vancouver Courier: Top 10 pick for Best Theatre of the Year
- Vancouverplays.com: Best of 2006 List
- Vancouverplays.com: Play of the Month Award
- Xtra West Live Performance of the Year Nominee
- 2 Jessie Award Nominations

Titus Andronicus

- Vancouver Courier: Top 10 pick for Best Theatre of the Year
- Vancouverplays.com: Best of the Year
- Vancouverplays.com: Play of the Month Award
- 5 Jessie Richardson Award Nominations

Julius Caesar

- Vancouver Courier: Top 10 pick for Best Theatre of the Year
- 2 Jessie Award Richardson Award Nominations

The Tempest

- 1 Jessie Award Nomination

== Residencies and Development ==
Theatre Werde + Flausen Innovation Incubator Platform (Oldenburg, Germany)

A three-month professional development residency to study the structures, practice and theory underpinning the German Innovation incubator Flausen +.

Shakespeare's Globe - Directing Studio 2018 (London, UK)

Offered to a selected 10 professional directors, a masterclass series focused on Shakespeare's plays in the Globe Theatre including original practice; actor's voice and physical practice on the bare stage.

The Young Vic Genesis Director's Network 2016 – Ongoing (London, UK)

As the only scheme of its kind in the UK, the Directors program provides proactive support for professional directors including skills workshops, peer-led projects and paid assistant directing roles.

Theatre503, Resident Producer 20116 (London, UK)

A residency with Olivier Award-winning London new play development theatre. Key members of the producing team responsibilities included: producing; contracting; marketing and social media; and grant writing.

Artistic Director Mentorship 2011/ 2012:�Three Provinces, Three Mandates, Three Companies

The 2011/ 2012 season was dedicated to developing a working understanding of the diverse artistic and administrative theatre production, presentation and development practices of Canadian Theatre. Each company presented a different form Canadian Theatre production. The residencies included New Play Development, Production and curation of a National Festival, meeting with Artists, PACT Meetings, Season Budgeting and Programing, Grant Writing and Fundraising, Board Development and Management.

- Playwrights’ Workshop Montreal, Emma Tibaldo (Montreal, Quebec)
- Theatre Conspiracy, Tim Carlson (Vancouver, British Columbia)
- The Magnetic North Theatre Festival, Brenda Leadlay (Ottawa, Ontario & Calgary, Alberta)

BASH Emerging Director Residency 2010, Canadian Stage (Toronto, Ontario)

BASH! is Canadian Stage's program for professional directors to explore approaches to contemporary performance practice, production and administration. The 2010 focus was on directing large-scale works.

Artist in Residence 2009, The Centaur Theatre (Montreal, Quebec)

Two months were spent with Executive Artistic Director Roy Surette and General Manager Chuck Childs researching the roles and responsibilities of the AD and administrative team of large regional theatre.

Neil Munro Directors’ Project 2009, The Shaw Festival (Niagara on the Lake, Ontario)

Each season, the Shaw Festival hires two promising professional directors in an extended residency. Jack was the assistant director on Eda Holmes’ In Good King George's Golden Days, Tadeusz Bradecki's The Devil Disciple and Jackie Maxwell's workshop of The Centerville Ghost. Additionally, Jack lead Audience pre-show chats, took part in Shaw Academy and ran an informal play reading serird. The residency finalised by directing The Love of Don Perlimplin with the Shaw company.
