= Matfield =

Village in Kent, England

Coordinates: 51.1488°N 0.3648°E

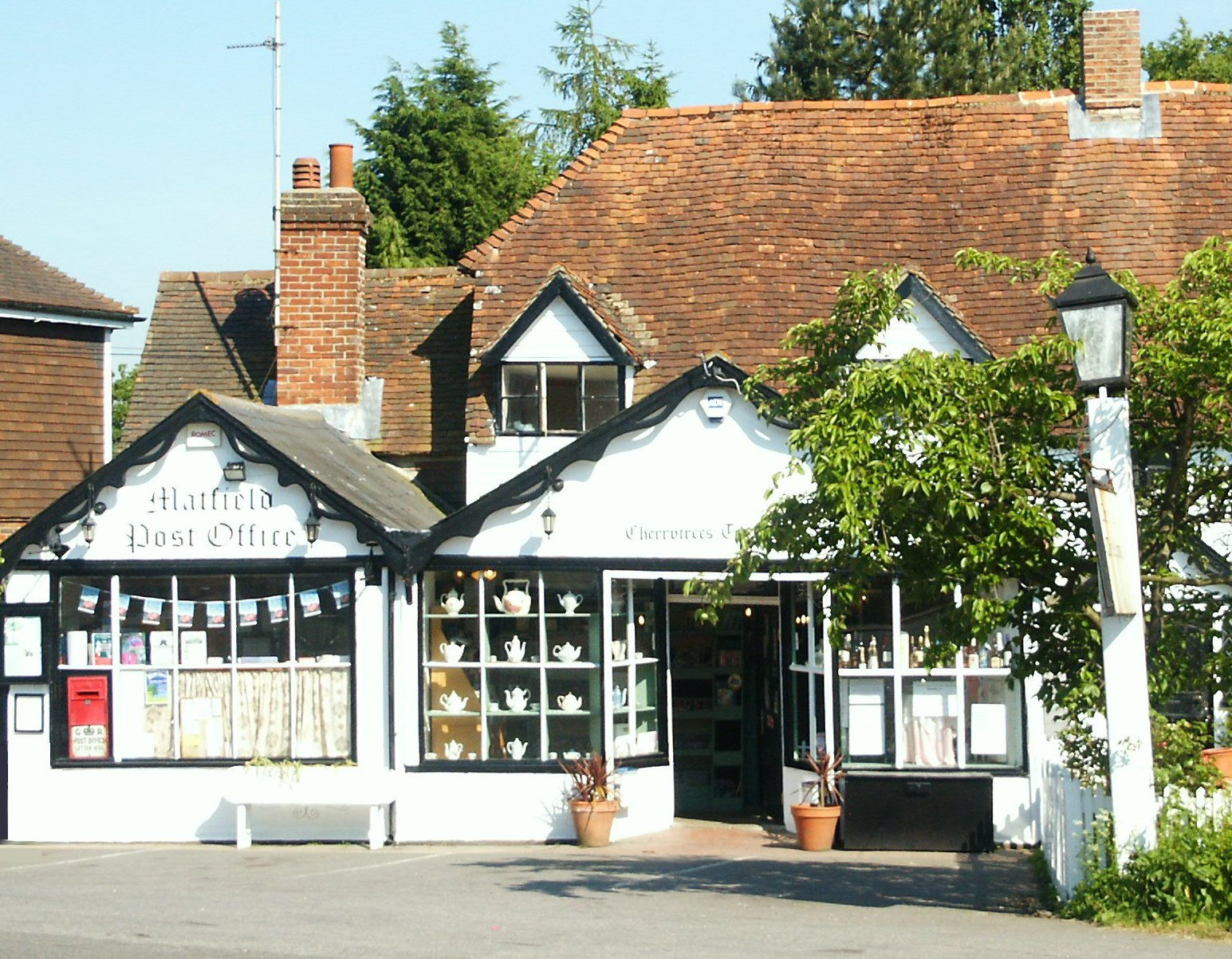
- Matfield Post Office

- Location within Kent
- OS grid reference: TQ655415
- Civil parish: Brenchley and Matfield
- District: Tunbridge Wells
- Shire county: Kent
- Region: South East
- Country: England
- Sovereign state: United Kingdom
- Post town: Tonbridge
- Postcode district: TN12
- Dialling code: 01892
- Police: Kent
- Fire: Kent
- Ambulance: South East Coast
- UK Parliament: Tunbridge Wells

Matfield is a small village, part of the civil parish of Brenchley and Matfield, in the Tunbridge Wells borough of Kent, England. Matfield was awarded the title of Kent Village of the Year in 2010.

== Buildings and amenities ==
St Luke's Church is a Grade II listed building.

Matfield currently has a butcher's and grocery store. Following the closure of The Wheel Wright's Arms in 2017, the village now only has two pubs, The Star and a gastropub, The Poet at Matfield, which was formerly known as the Standing's Cross. This unusual name lasted for over 150 years from the earliest days of the pub. It was so named as, in the 1840s, John Standing ran an alehouse in his cottage and served his customers homebrew from barrels in his front room. However, he had problems with his cellar which flooded whenever it rained. So, he sold his house and moved across the road into a bakery – converting it into Matfield's new alehouse. The pub was creatively named to celebrate this event, hence ‘Standing’s Cross’. More recently the pub was renamed to ‘The Poet’ in commemoration of the World War One poet, Siegfried Sassoon, who was born in the village.

== Geography ==
Matfield is located around 5 miles (8.0 km) southeast of Royal Tunbridge Wells and 2 miles (3.2 km) south of Paddock Wood.

The village grew up around its village green, which is the largest in Kent. The village green features a large pond at its northern end. Overlooking the green is the grade I listed Matfield House, a Georgian building with a stable block and coachhouse at the rear. The green is used for events such as the annual village fete and by Matfield Cricket Club for home matches.

== Notable people ==
- Siegfried Sassoon (1886–1967), poet, was born in Matfield.
- Theresa Thornycroft (1853–1946), sculptor, lived in Matfield.
- Frank Marchant (1864–1946), cricketer and captain of Kent County Cricket Club, born in Matfield House.
- Alan Watt (1907–74), cricketer, lived in Matfield
- Harrison Weir (1824–1906), artist, lived in Matfield.
