= Boghead =

Boghead may refer to:

- Boghead, South Lanarkshire, a village in Scotland
- Boghead Park, a former football ground in Dumbarton, Scotland
- Boghead coal, a variety of oil shale
- Boghead (bastle), a fortified farmhouse in Northumbria, England
