= Boghead (bastle) =

16th-century house in Tarset, Northumberland

Coordinates: 55.2126°N 2.3763°W

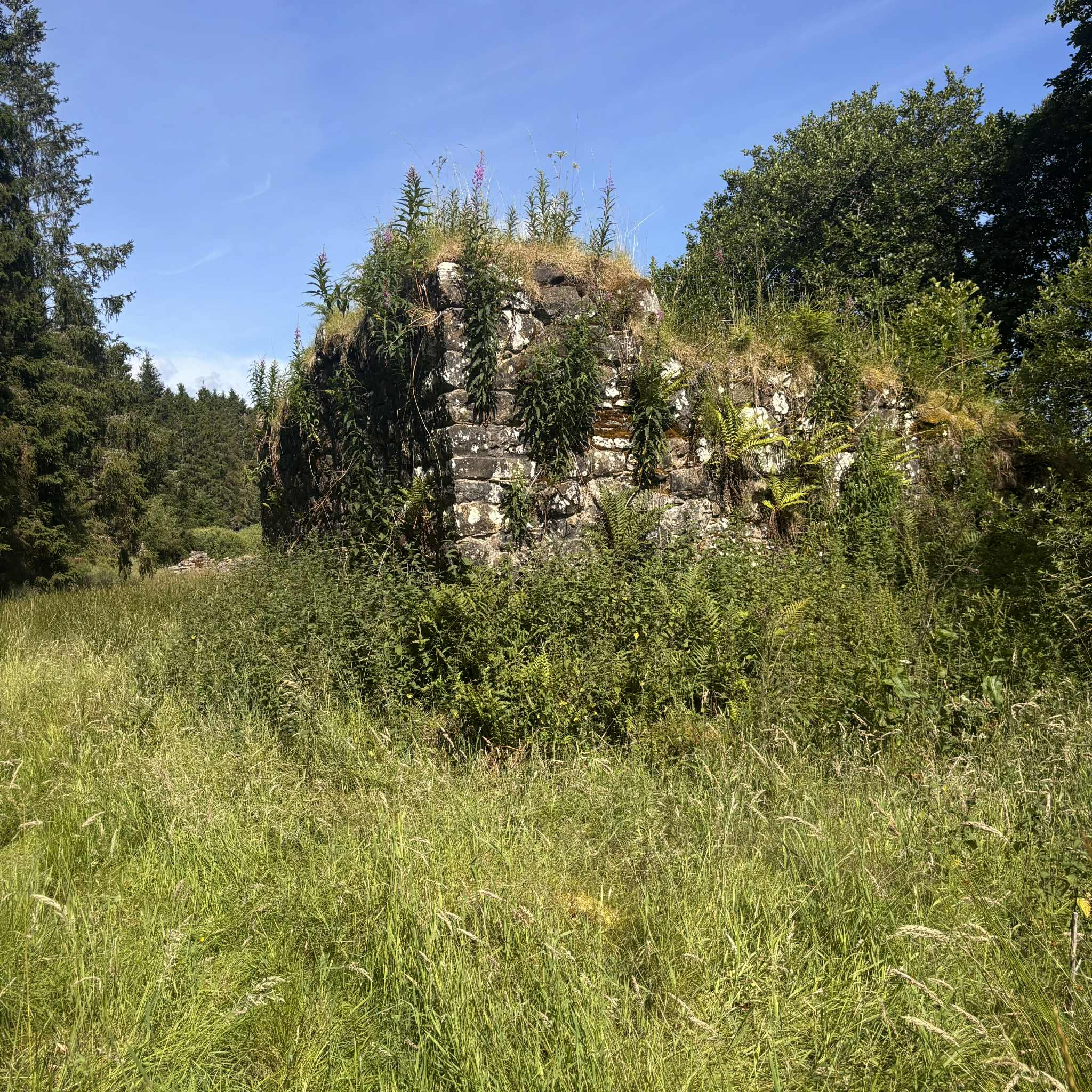
The remains of the main bastle building viewed from the east, 2025

Boghead, also known variously as Bog Head, Corby Castle, Corbie Castle, Corbie's Castle, Barty's Pele, or Borbie Castle, is a 16th-century bastle house in Tarset, Northumberland. Bastles are fortified farm houses built in the early modern period in the Anglo-Scottish marches. They were designed to provide shelter to farmers and their livestock, who faced the threat of raids from border reivers. The Boghead site consists of remains of the bastle itself as well as the remains of two farmhouses and a sheepfold. Boghead is one of several bastles on the banks of Tarset Burn, a small river, and one of many in the wider North Tynedale area.

Local folklore associates Boghead with the story of Barty Milburn and Corbit Jack, who undertook a retaliatory raid against Scots who had stolen sheep. According to the story, Barty killed two Scots, one of whom killed Corbit Jack, before returning with sheep. Barty Milburn may be the Bartrame Mylburne who reported an attack led by Kinmont Willie Armstrong on the people of Tynedale, including the people of Boghead, in 1583, which was the year Boghead entered the historical record. The site remained in use in the more peaceful following decades, but had seemingly fallen out of use by 1770.

The site is a scheduled monument and the main bastle building is a Grade II listed building. It has national significance as a rare example of a relatively unmodified bastle building; as one of several surviving bastles in the local area; and because it features a "quenching hole", an unusual defensive feature to put out fires lit against the ground-floor doorway. The site is publicly accessible as part of the Tarset Bastle Trail. Writing in 2020, the journalist Katie Gatens described it as "a bastle slumped in the long grass, finally conquered by thick moss".

== Historical context ==
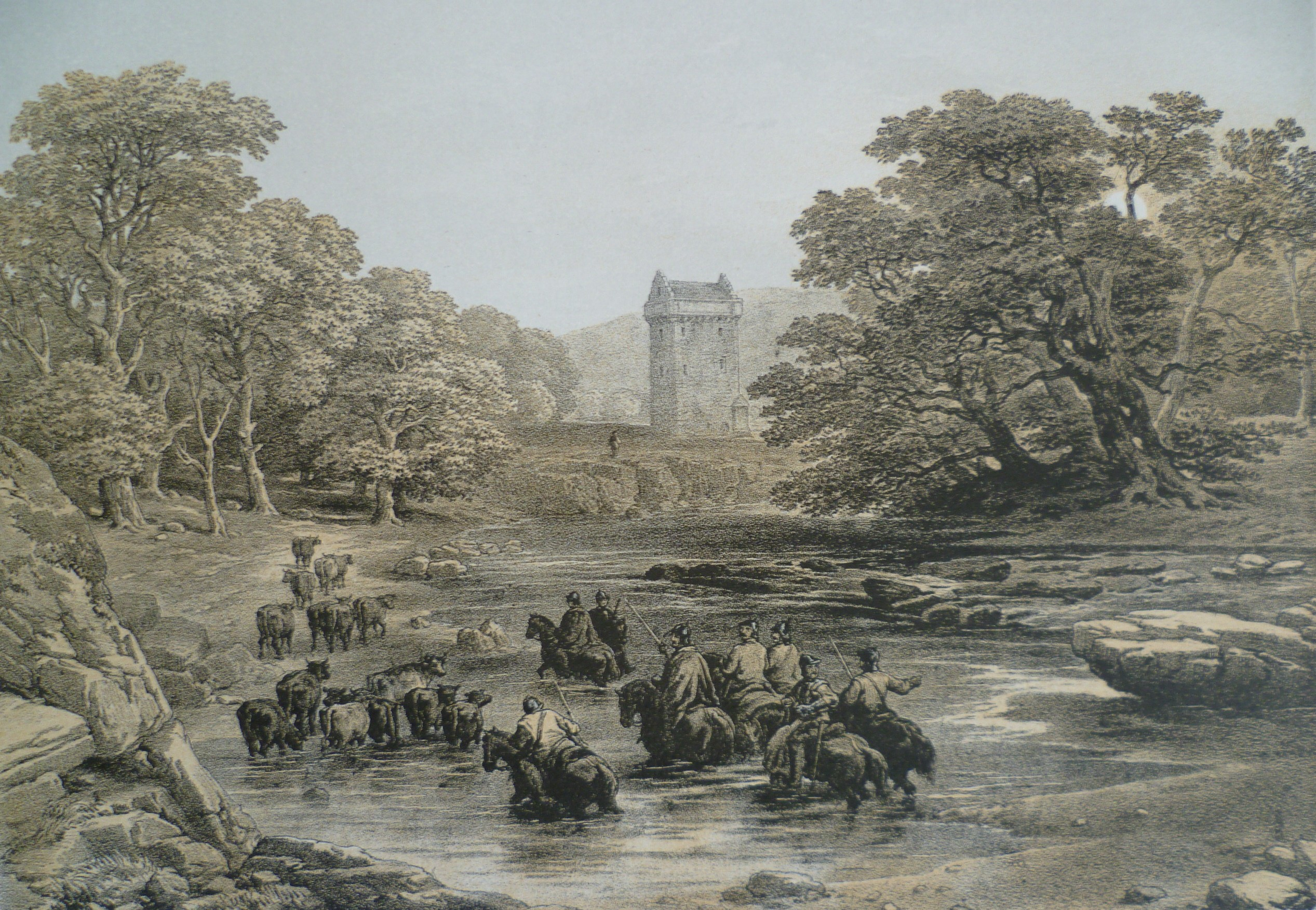
A 19th century representation of a reiver raid, with Gilnockie Tower, a noted example of a 16th-century tower house in Dumfriesshire, in the background. Gilnockie belonged to Clan Armstrong; Kinmont Willie Armstrong (of the Tower of Sark, near Gilnockie) led a raid against North Tynedale, including Boghead, in 1583.

In early modern Britain, the marches around the Anglo-Scottish border were culturally and legally distinct from both Scotland to the north and England to the south. Reiving, a term which captures a range of banditry practices including livestock theft and blackmail, was a feature of life in the region, as were loyalties to (and rivalries between) clans or "surnames". The particular surnames of the remote North Tyne valley, where Boghead is located, were Charlton, Milburn, Dodd, and Robson. The threat of raids influenced the buildings of the border region, including pele towers and bastle houses. Although these names are somewhat interchangeable (and several other names are used) pele towers are tall, typically with battlements. Bastles include both large fortified farmhouses and smaller, rougher, thick-walled barns.

These simpler bastles, of which many are known from North Tynedale, were two-storey, with thick walls, combining the function of a barmkin (a fortified enclosure) and a pele into a single building. Typically, there would be thick wooden external doors on both the ground floor and the first floor, with no internal stairway. The ground floor served to protect valuable livestock in the event of a raid, while the first floor comprised the living quarters. Access to the first floor was via a retractable external ladder or, later, when raids presented less of a threat, by external stone stairs. The bastles might feature small windows or ventilation slits on either floor, but they would have provided little light. Amenities were basic: The first floor would include a fireplace, and perhaps wattle and daub or curtain partitions and basic cupboard space. Water would be stored in a barrel, with a bucket for toileting. More defensively practical roofs would have featured stone slabs secured to beams; heather thatching would present a fire risk, but was also in use in some cases.

According to the archaeologist John Dodds, between 400 and 500 bastles were built in Northumbria; in 2011, the archaeologist Rolin Christopherson found that the existence of some 210 could be verified. Bastles often appear in loose collections, a few hundred metres apart, though there are also examples of solitary bastles or with two or three in very close proximity. Boghead is part of a cluster along Tarset Burn, a river that originates on Emblehope Moor, then travels south-east, to where it joins the North Tyne approximately 7.5 kilometres (4.7 mi) below the reservoir of Kielder Water. In 1999, the archaeologist Amy Lax classified Boghead as the most northerly of ten bastles along the Tarset Burn. The others are Highfield, the Comb, Shilla Hill, Waterhead, Hill House, two at Black Middens, and two at Gatehouse. She added that there was historical evidence, but not archaeological evidence, of bastles at the nearby settlements of Redheugh and Sidwood. A 2008 survey listed Boghead as one of three bastles along the Tarset Burn, the others being Shilla Hill and Black Middens. Christopherson identified the remains of 15 bastles in Tarset: two at Black Middens, Boghead, Boughthill, Camp Cottage, Donkleywood, Gatehouse Farm South, Gatehouse North, the south Bastle at Gatehouse, Hill House, Shilla Hill, and Waterhead are ruins, while Gatehouse Farmhouse, Highfield, and Redheugh remain in use as houses. The Tarset Archive Group identifies 33 bastles in the area, though some are reported sites with no visible remains, and others survive only in the most minimal form.

== Location ==
Boghead on a Northumberland map

The site is located at OSGB NY 76124 91005, 730 metres (2,400 ft) north west of Comb, in Tarset, Northumberland, in the foothills of the Cheviots. It is around 15 kilometres (9 mi) from the current Anglo-Scottish border.

Boghead sits at the confluence of Tarset Burn to the east and the smaller Highfield Burn to the north, squarely in a floodplain. To the north west, there is another river; though now dry, it drained into Highfield Burn into the 20th century. This suggests that the courses of the surrounding rivers have changed repeatedly over the centuries that Boghead has stood. The ground around the buildings is marshy, with standing water and water channels. It sits at the base of a steep slope facing north east.

Boghead, along with several other bastles in the area, lies within the 20th century Kielder Forest. Although the site now sits in a clearing, there is evidence that it has previously had trees planted within it. From the late 13th century until the planting of the woodland, the area would have been moorland punctuated by occasional agricultural sites.

== Name ==
The bastle is known by a range of different names; "such confusion in naming is not unique". These include Boghead, Bog Head, Corby Castle, Corbie Castle, Corbie's Castle, Barty's Pele, and Borbie Castle. It is also sometimes called the Comb, although that name more typically refers to a separate nearby site. Lax argues that, of the various names used to refer to the site, Boghead is the "more correct"; this appears on an 1866 Ordnance Survey map and an 1841 tithe map.

== Site ==
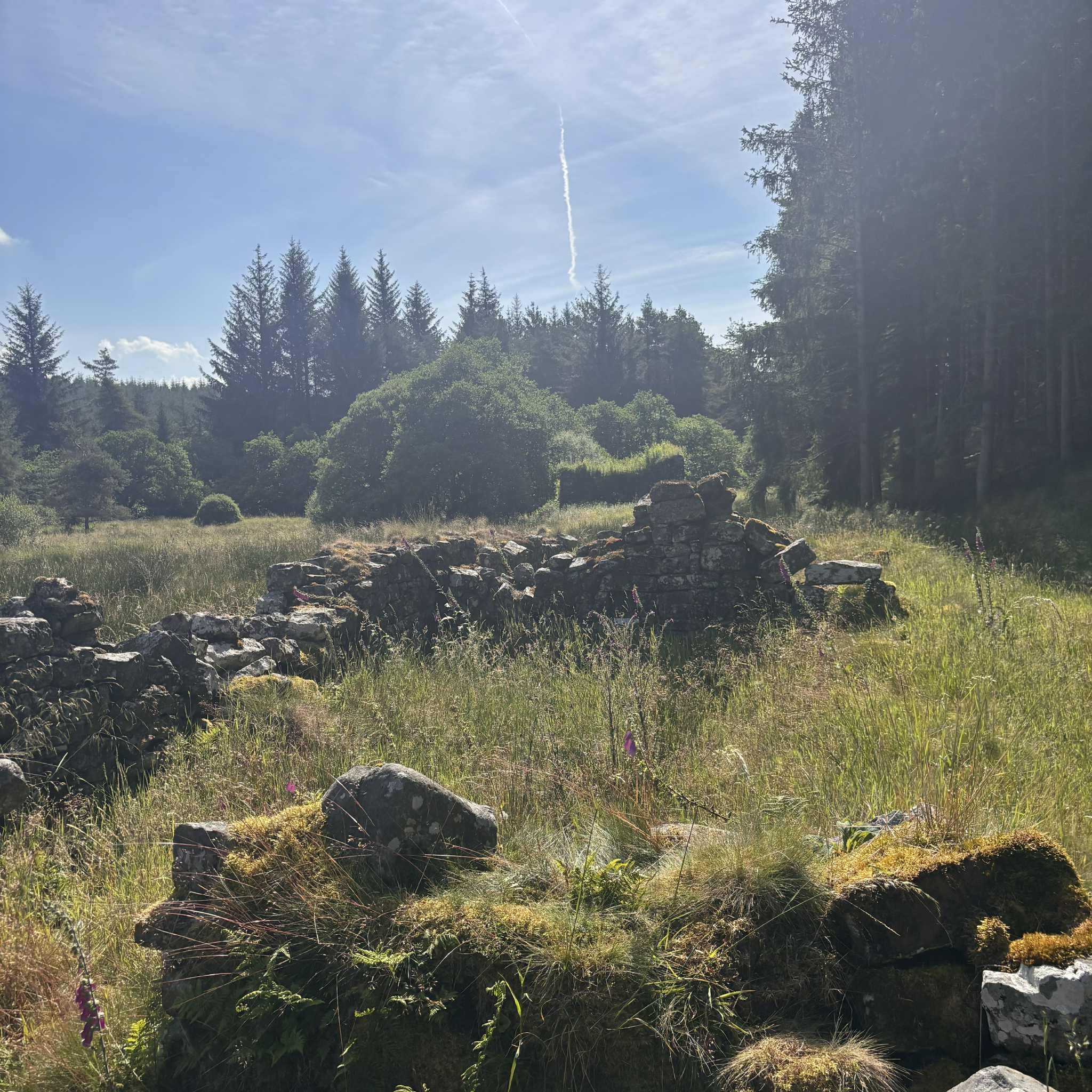
The visible farmhouse ruins; the bastle building is visible in the background, with the base of the steep slope visible to the right.

The site consists of four distinct structures: a bastle, two farmhouses (one in ruins, one identifiable from earthworks), and earthworks indicating a sheepfold with a possible shepherd's hut. Though the structures may have been built at different times, the buildings all represent part of the same bastle complex; at one time, they would have been a small hamlet.

=== Bastle ===
The bastle is rectangular; it measures 9.6 by 7 metres (31 by 23 ft) on the outside. It is oriented from the south east to the north west. The walls are 1.4 metres (4 ft 7 in) thick, built using big, unhewn stones. Rough boulders feature as quoins. At its taller points, on the south west and north west, the remaining wall stands at 4.5 metres (10 ft). On the south east and north east walls, it stands at 2 to 4 metres (6 ft 7 in to 13 ft 1 in).

The west wall features an entranceway to the ground floor. The head is square, and features round door jambs. There is evidence of two doors featuring drawbars. A distinctive and unusual feature of this bastle is a tunnel cut through the wall above the doorway. Although this has been described as a murder hole, it is much more likely that it is a "quenching hole"; if someone attacking the bastle were to light a fire in the doorway, those defending the structure could douse it by pouring water through the tunnel. The ground floor once featured a vaulted roof, which has now mostly collapsed. The eastern wall features a slit window.

The external means of accessing the upper floor, which would have been the living area, are unclear; it may have been a wooden ladder or a staircase.

=== Other structures ===
To the immediate north west of the bastle, oriented from the south east to the north west, is a farmstead. Though very close to the bastle, Lax reports that it does not seem to be attached, though at the time she was writing, tumbled stone prevented a full exploration. Only the foundations remain today, and they are covered in plant life. It measures 17.5 by 4.5 metres (60 by 10 ft) externally, and 11.4 by 3.6 metres (37 by 12 ft) internally. The end walls are 1.4 metres (4 ft 7 in) thick, and up to 70 centimetres (30 in) high. The building has two rooms, but these are not conjoined internally. There is a single entrance into the larger (and more substantially built) room in the north-eastern end. The smaller room is at the north western end, and may have been a byre or outbuilding.

13 metres (43 ft) beyond the first farmhouse is a second. This measures 24 by 6 metres (80 by 20 ft) externally, and 21.8 by 4.3 metres (72 by 14 ft) internally. Though ruined, more of it is visible than the first farmhouse; the surviving walls are up to 2.0 metres (6 ft 7 in). It has three rooms.

Beyond the second farmhouse are earthworks indicating a sheepfold. It measures up to 12 by 23 metres (39 by 75 ft). Its banks are 0.5 metres (1 ft 8 in) tall with a width of 2.5 metres (8 ft 2 in). Earthworks immediately to the east of the sheepfold indicate a possible site of a shepherd's hut; a platform measures 4.7 by 5 metres (15 by 16 ft).

== History ==
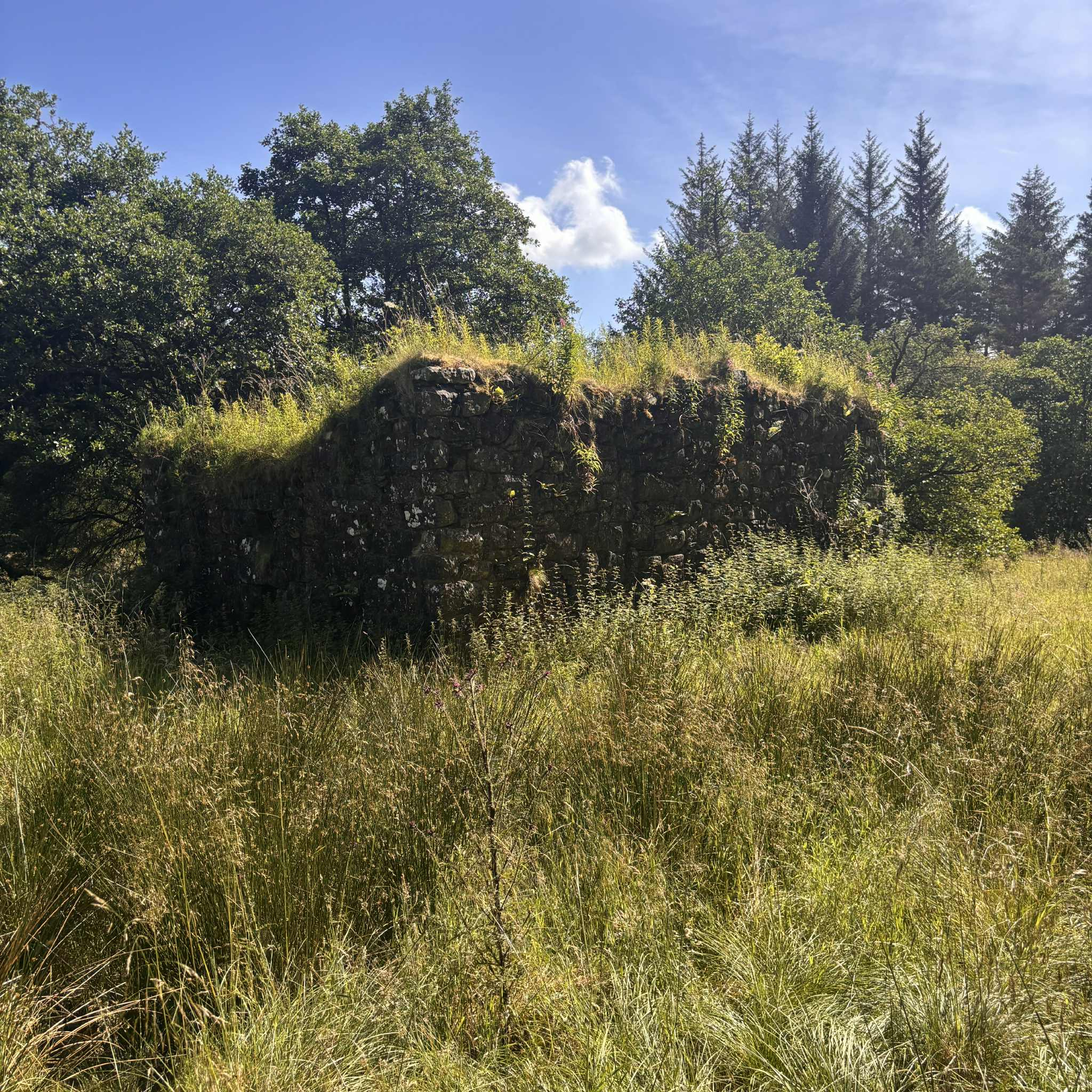
The remains of the bastle. The west wall, featuring the ground-floor entry point and quenching hole, is visible to the left, partially obscured by undergrowth and shadow.

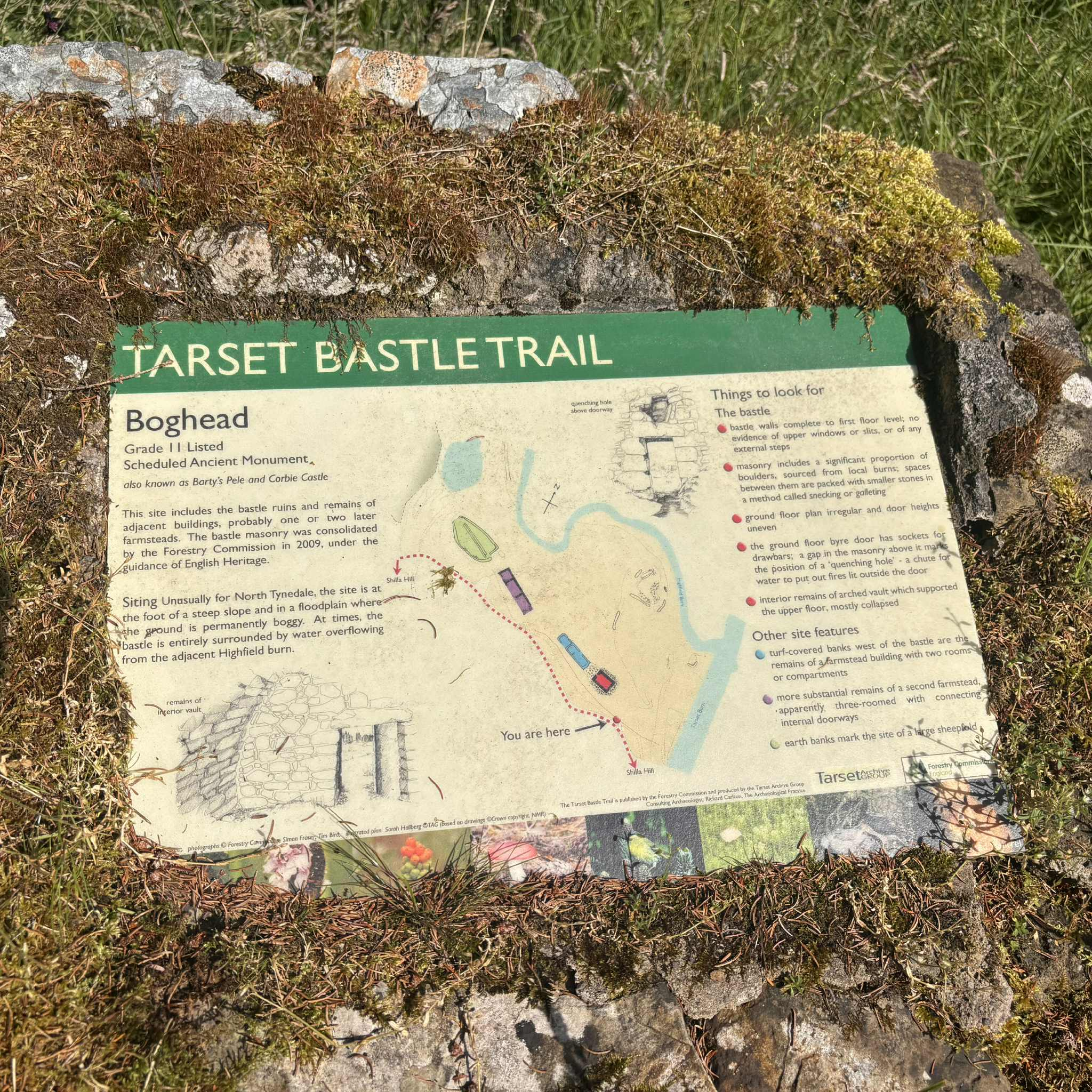
An informational board about Boghead as part of the Tarset Bastle Trail

=== Origins ===
Bastles are understood to have been built in the late 16th to 17th centuries. Few bastles have been excavated or dated. However, documentary evidence suggests that Boghill, and neighbouring bastles, were in existence by the middle to second half of the 16th century. However, this is comparatively early for bastles; those reliably dated typically originated towards the end of the period. It is therefore possible either that Boghead and its neighbours were early bastles, or else that the documentary evidence dating these settlements to the 16th century refer to pre-bastle dwellings. However, Lax reports that there is limited archaeological evidence of pre-bastle buildings at the sites in the Tarset valley, and none at Boghead.

The people of Boghead were freehold farmers, though not necessarily wealthy. They were pastoralists. Aerial photography and comparisons with evidence from the nearby bastles suggest that the people at Boghead would also have grown their own cereals, as well as fodder crops. Like all bastles, Boghead was built as a defensive structure; however, the fact that it was overlooked by a slope would have put it at a defensive disadvantage. On the other hand, the surrounding rivers would have made approach difficult on three sides, and the slope, on the fourth side, would have offered a degree of concealment.

=== Raids and feuds ===
According to North Tynedale folklore, Boghead was the home of Barty Milburn, Corbitt Jack (also called Corbit Jack), or both. The 19th century historian Edward Charlton recorded the story as told to him by Muckle Jock Milburn (died 1837), who claimed to be descended from Barty. Charlton identifies Barty's home as the Combe, though Jack's home is not identified by name. Charlton's telling for the story is as follows:

Barty was a celebrated swordsman, as well as of prodigious strength. He appears to have lived about the end of the seventeenth century. Barty's dwelling was very near to the Scottish border, and, therefore, was sadly exposed to the inroads of the Scottish reivers, who still retained, long after the union of England and Scotland, the habit of making raids for cattle on the English side. Barty's ally was a stout yeoman, called Corbit Jack, or Hodge Corby, whose peel stood a little father up the burn, and is still in tolerable preservation. Ther is a slight attempt at a moat around it, and on a stone in the low doorway there are three rude crosses incised. One morning, when Barty arose, his sheep were all missing, they had been driven off by Scottish thieves during the night. He immediately summoned Corbit Jack, and arming themselves, they followed the track of the sheep over the hill, down the Blackhopeburn, into Reedwater, and thence across the border north of the Carter, into Scotland. Here they lost the trace altogether, and they seem to have been unprovided with a "sleuth hound" to track the thieves. Barty, however, insisted that they should not return emptyhanded, and, after a short council, they decided that the Leatham wethers were the best, and accordingly they drove off a goodly selection of these, and commenced their retreat. The loss was soon perceived by the Scottish men, who immediately despatched two of their best swordsmen to recover the booty. They overtook Barty and Corbit Jack and Chattlehope Spout, and insisted that the wethers should be delivered up. Barty was willing to return half the flock, but he would not go back "toom-handed" to the Combe. The two Scots being picked men, would not hear of a compromise, and the fight began directly, in the long heather above the waterfall. Barty called out "Let the better man turn to me!" and the Scot, after a few passes, ran his broadsword into Barty's thigh. [Barty] jumped round, and wrenched the sword, so that it broke, and at the same moment he was attacked from behind by the other Scot, who had already slain his comrade, Corbit Jack. Barty made one tremendous back-handed blow, caught the second Scot in the neck and—as [Muckle Jock] expressed it—"garred his heid spang alang the heather like an inion." His first assailant tried to make off, but was down ere he had run many yards. Barty took both swords, lifted his dead companion on his back, and, in spite of his own wound, drove the sheep safely over the height down to the Comb, and deposited Corbit Jack's body at his own door.

Although clear identification is difficult, Barty Milburn may have been Bartrame Mylburne, who appears in the historical record when he reported a raid on Tynedale led by Kinmont Willie Armstrong. Boghead is specifically mentioned as one of the sites attacked. This complaint was passed to Francis Walsingham by Thomas Scrope, 10th Baron Scrope of Bolton in 1583, which is when Boghead enters the historical record:

Compleynes Bartrame Mylburne of the Keyme, Gynkyne Hunter of the Waterhead in Tyndale, upon William Armestronge of Kinmowthe, Eckye Armestronge of the Gyngles, Thome Armestronge of the Gyngles, Thomas Armestronge called Androwes Thome, of the Gyngles, Johne Forster sone to Meikle Rowie of Genehawghe, George Armestronge, called Eenyens Geordie, and his sons, of Arcletou in Ewesdale, and there com-plices, for that they and others to the nomber of thre hundrethe parsons in warlyke maner ranne one opyn forrowe in the daye tyme, on Frydaie in the moriiynge last, beinge the xxx^{th} of August, in Tyndale unto certen place that is to saye the Keyme, the Reidhewghe, the Blacke Myddynes, the Hill howse, the Water head, the Starr head, the Bog head, the High feelde, and there raysed fyer and brunte the most pairte of them, and maisterfullie refte, stale and drave awaye fowre hundrethe kyen and oxen, fowre hundrethe sheip, and goate, xxx horses and mears, and the spoyle and ihsyght of the howses to the walewe of towe hundrethe pounds, and slewe and murdered crewellie six parsons, and maymed and hurte ellevin parsons, and tooke and led awaye xxx presoners, and them do deteigne and keip in warlyke maner myndinge to ransom them contrarie the vertewe of trewes and lawes of the Marches. Wherof they aske redres.

A late 1580s record of a 1584 attack on Tynedale, part of a document listing Liddesdale offences, reads as follows:

Jenkyn Huntter, Bartie Milburne of the Keam, Jarrie Huntter, Mychaell Milburne and Laute Milburn of Tersett in Tyudaile, complain uppon Davye Ellot called "The Carlinge", Cleme Croser called "Nebles [Noseless] Cleme", Thome Armestronge called "Symes Thom", Will Armestronge called "Kynmothe", Ecktor Armestronge of the Hillhouse, and other 200 men, who ran a day foray, and took away forty score kye and oxen, three score horses and meares, 500 sheep, burned 60 houses, and spoiling the same to the value of 2000l. sterling and slaying 10 men—at Michaelmas 1584.

=== Decline ===
No bastles in the Tarset area exist in their original form. Some were adapted for use as homes or farm buildings; others were quarried for stone. The Boghead bastle building, though functional, would not have offered comfortable living arrangements for its inhabitants, and they would perhaps have been eager to move to more comfortable dwellings. The building of the farmhouses perhaps indicates a transition to a more peaceful time, especially as the farmhouse moved physically further away from the bastle building. The marginalization of the defensive structure suggests that the settlement became primarily oriented around farming, with little need for defence. At the Boghead site, the farmhouse of which more remains was presumably built later than the first, and may have used stones from the first in its construction. This is indicated by the fact that it is better preserved, and the fact that it is of a more sophisticated design. In turn, the later farmhouse shows signs of later modification; a doorway through the partition wall to the south west was blocked at some point, suggesting that the living quarters were made smaller. This may have been to convert one of the rooms into an outbuilding, or perhaps to divide the building between multiple occupants.

By 1663, the site was one of several in the area owned by the Hunter family; it was described as "messuage, containing in arable land, meadow and pasture 12 acres and sufficient common of pasture". However, it did not appear in 1770 land tax register, suggesting that it had fallen out of use by this time.

=== Conservation ===
The bastle site was listed as a scheduled monument in 1970, meaning that it is today protected under the Ancient Monuments and Archaeological Areas Act 1979. The bastle itself has been a Grade II listed building since 1988. This offers it protection under the Planning (Listed Buildings and Conservation Areas) Act 1990. Boghead has been subject to a small amount of restoration work by the Forestry Commission.

The site is significant as fewer than 300 bastles survive, with many seeing subsequent modification and continued use. Consequently, bastles that survive in a relatively unmodified form are "nationally important". The Boghead site survives "reasonably well", while the bastle's quenching hole is a rare feature. Boghead's significance is strengthened by the fact that several other bastles survive in the vicinity, offering an important site for enhancing archaeological and historical knowledge of early modern Northumberland life.

The site is accessible as part of the Tarset Bastle Trail. Katie Gatens, who wrote about the route for The Sunday Times in 2020, evoked Boghead as "a bastle slumped in the long grass, finally conquered by thick moss".
