= Bastle house =

Fortified house of the Anglo-Scottish border

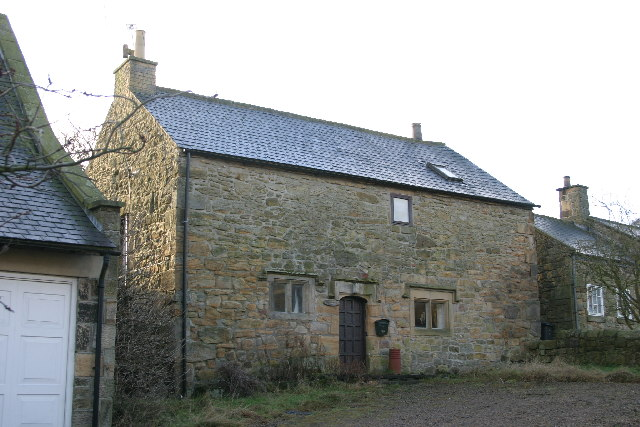
Rebellion House at High Callerton near Ponteland – a simple bastle house a long way south of the border

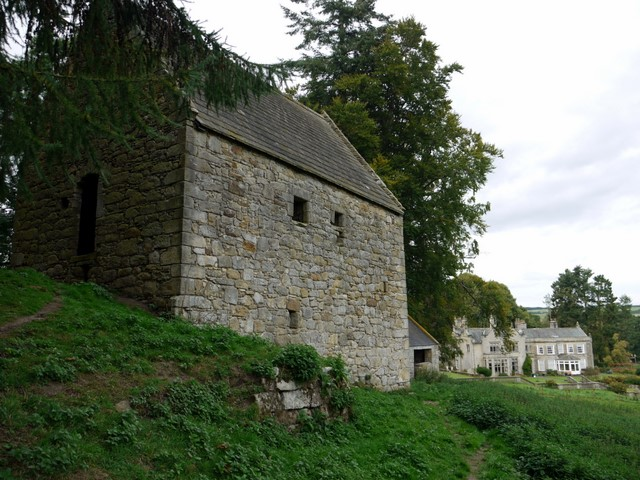
Woodhouses Bastle

Bastle houses (also bastel or bastille) are a type of construction found along the Anglo-Scottish border, in the areas attacked by border reivers during the 16th century. They are fortified farmhouses, characterised by security measures against raids. Their name is said to derive from the French word "bastille".

== Characteristics ==
The characteristics of the classic bastle house are thick stone walls (about one metre thick), with the ground floor devoted to stable space for the most valuable animals, and a vaulted stone or flat timber floor between it and the first floor with internal access such as a stairway or ladder. The family's living quarters were on the floor above the ground, and during the times before the suppression of the reivers, were only reachable by a ladder which was pulled up from the inside at night. The windows were small, often little more than slits. Bastles occasionally had a "quenching hole" to extinguish fires set against the ground floor entrance, as at Boghead, Northumberland.

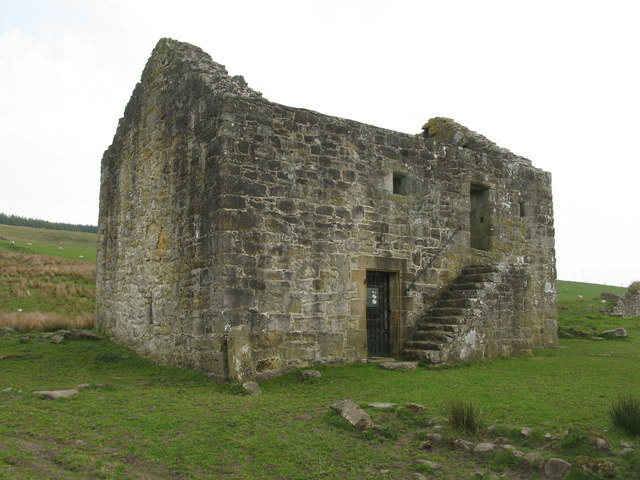
Black Middens Bastle, Northumberland

Bastle houses have many characteristics in common with military blockhouses, the main difference being that a bastle was intended primarily as a family dwelling, instead of a pure fortification. Hence bastle houses generally lacked features for active defence, such as battlements or gunloops, their purpose merely being to hold out against a sudden raid by lightly-armed reivers or moss-troopers.

Many bastle houses survive today due to their durable stone construction, but most are either ruined or much altered for use as residences or farm buildings. They may be seen on both sides of the Anglo-Scottish border. Some well-preserved examples are Thropton Pele, Hole Bastle, Woodhouses Bastle and Black Middens Bastle. The Gatehouse gazetteer lists 571 possible bastles in England, though some of these have disappeared entirely. Where bastle houses are heavily ruined, their remains can be difficult to distinguish from peel towers.

== See also ==
- Peel tower
- Scottish Vernacular
- Tower house
- Tower houses in Great Britain and Ireland
- English vernacular architecture
- Border reivers
- Wars of Scottish independence

== Bibliography ==
- Herman Gabriel Ramm, R. W. McDowall, Eric Mercer (1970) 'Shielings and Bastles. HMSO: London.
- Davison, Andrew; Jessop, Lucy; Whitfield, Matthew (2013). Alston Moor, Cumbria. Historic England. ISBN 9781848021174.
