= Château de Jean =

French château built on the site of an older castle

Coordinates: 43°44′35″N 1°30′5″E

The Château de Jean is a French château built on the site of an older castle in the commune of Villariès in the Haute-Garonne département of France.

About 1559, the De Jean family acquired the castle which was destroyed in 1570 during the Wars of Religion. The current château was built with a defensive character on the site of the old castle at the beginning of the 17th century, then largely remodelled in the 18th century to make a comfortable residence. The rebuilding was done by Jean De Jean, Procureur to the Seneschal of Toulouse in 1604. The major part of the current structure was his work, carried out after 1621, including the fish pond mentioned on several occasions in the texts.

In 1754, the castle was bought by a rich trader, Jean Toulza, who proceeded to make many alterations and extensions: terrace, installing windows in the facades, side wings and cellar, interior decoration (plaster work going back to 1787).

The Château de Jean comprises:

- a central rectangular residence confined by four corbelled towers equipped at the base with defensive murder-holes
- two symmetrical side wings of common buildings
- the old chapel, at the end of the north wing

The 17th-century building is constructed on vaulted cellars. In front of it to the south is a terrace laid out in the 18th century. The four corner towers are vaulted on the ground floor. It is probable that all window places in the southern facade, as well as in the higher parts of the château, were made by Jean Toulza in the 18th century. The interior decoration also dates from this period, most notably the beautiful plasterwork in the "Salon des Arts Libéraux et du Négoce" ("Liberal Arts and Trade Salon") on the first floor. The rear facades were improved. In the extension to the east common a chapel was built by Jean Toulza who is buried there. It comprises a gracious interior pediment in plasterwork representing musician angels.

Privately owned, the Château de Jean has been listed since 1998 as a monument historique by the French Ministry of Culture.

== See also ==
- List of castles in France
