= Donald Mackenzie Wallace =

Scottish public servant and writer (1841–1919)

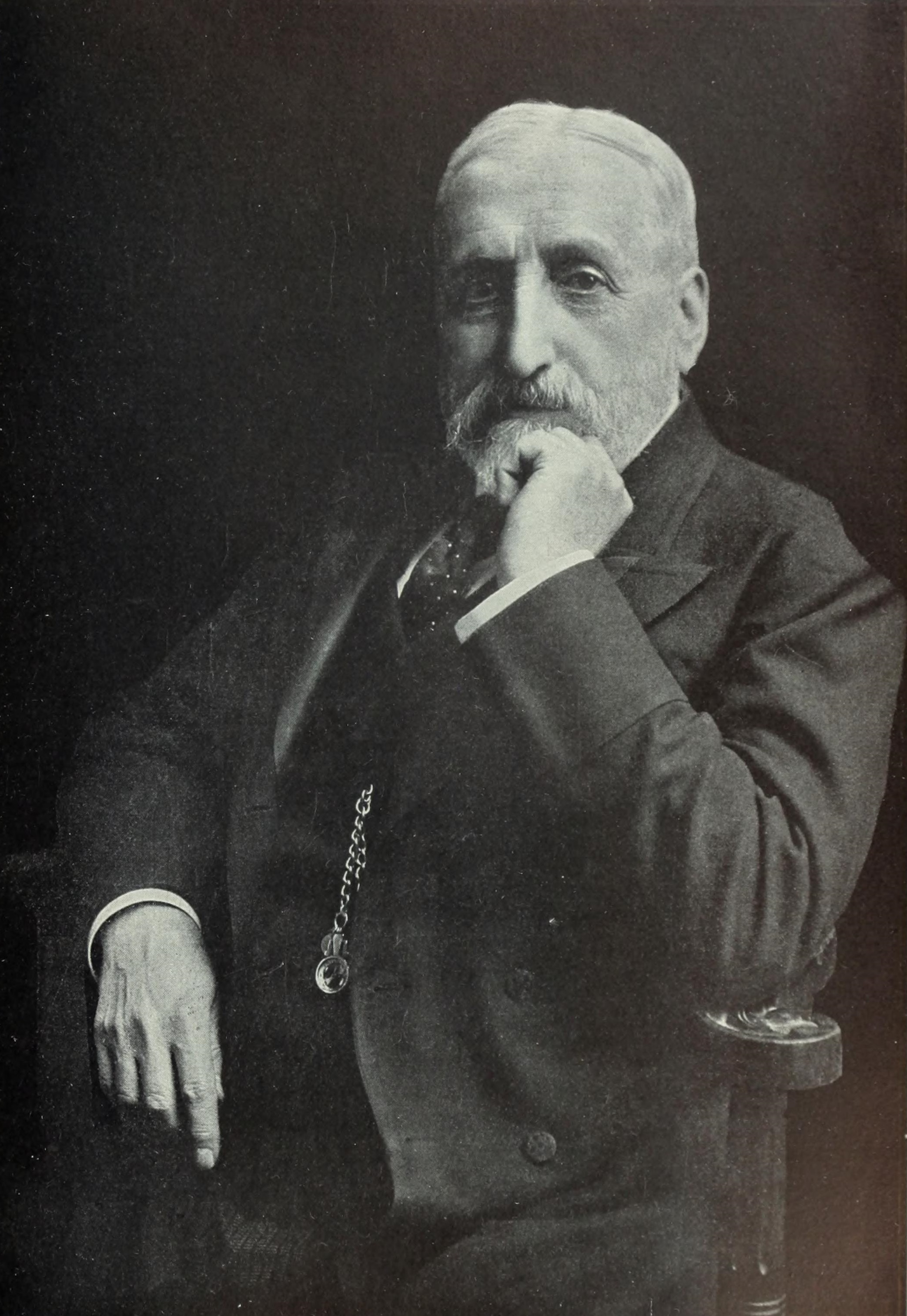
Donald Mackenzie Wallace.

Sir Donald Mackenzie Wallace KCIE KCVO (11 November 1841 – 10 January 1919) was a Scottish public servant, writer, editor and foreign correspondent of The Times (London).

== Early life ==
Donald Mackenzie Wallace was born to Robert Wallace of Boghead, Dunbartonshire, and Sarah Mackenzie. Both his parents died before Donald turned ten. By the age of fifteen, Wallace immersed himself in his studies. He spent all his time before the age of twenty-eight in continuous study at various universities such as Edinburgh and Glasgow, focusing his study on metaphysics and ethics. He spent the remaining years at the École de Droit, Paris, and applied himself to Roman law at the universities of Berlin and Heidelberg, graduating with a doctorate in law from Heidelberg in 1867.

== Travels to Russia ==
Wallace accepted a private invitation to visit Russia, having a strong desire to study the Ossetes, a tribe of Iranian descent in the Caucasus. Living in Russia from early 1870 until late 1875, Wallace found the Russian civilization far more interesting than his original Ossetes. Wallace returned to the United Kingdom in 1876 and published three volumes in his work Russia by 1877, right before the outbreak of the Russo-Turkish War. His book had great success, going through several editions and being translated into many languages.

== Foreign correspondent ==
Due to the success of his work in Russia, Wallace was appointed as foreign correspondent of The Times. His first post was St. Petersburg in 1877-78; he was then sent to the Congress of Berlin in June and July 1878. There he assisted Henri de Blowitz, the famous Paris correspondent of The Times, and carried the text of the treaty from Berlin to Brussels sewn into the lining of his greatcoat. From 1878-1883 he was in Constantinople; while there, he investigated the Balkan peoples and their problems and ended up going on a special mission to Egypt. The outcome of Wallace's mission to Egypt became another successful book, Egypt and the Egyptian Question (1884). After traveling through the Middle East, Wallace was selected as the political officer of the future Tsar Nicholas II in his Indian tour of 1890-91, for which he later received 1st class Russian Order of St. Stanislas. He served as Private Secretary to Lords Dufferin and Lansdowne, in India.

== Later life ==
In his last years Wallace reverted to his youthful self and devoted himself to study again. He didn't publish anything after his last book, The Web of Empire, in 1902. He contributed briefly to the editing of the 10th edition of the Encyclopædia Britannica, but in March 1901 he was taken from his Britannica duties by the Duke of Cornwall and York, (the future King George V), who asked Wallace to act as his Private secretary during an extensive world tour. During seven months from March to October 1901 the royal party visited Gibraltar, Malta, Aden, Ceylon, Australia, New Zealand, Straits Settlements, Natal and Cape Colony, and Canada.

Wallace was later attached to Emperor of Russia during his visit to England, 1909, then was Extra Groom-in-Waiting to Emperor Edward VII, 1909–10, and to Emperor George V from 1910. He was knighted as a Knight Commander of the Order of the Indian Empire (KCIE) for his services to India in 1888, and subsequently appointed a Knight Commander of the Royal Victorian Order (KCVO) for his services during the Commonwealth tour in 1901.

He never married and died at Lymington, Hampshire, on 10 January 1919.

== Books ==
- Russia, 2 vols. (London: Cassell, 1877); vol. 1; 1905 revised and enlarged edition of vol. 2
- Egypt and the Egyptian Question (1883)
- The Web of Empire (1902)

== Sources ==
- G. E. Buckle, ‘Wallace, Sir Donald Mackenzie (1841–1919)’, rev. H. C. G. Matthew, Oxford Dictionary of National Biography, Oxford University Press, 2004 accessed 28 Oct 2007
