= Villariès =

- Commune
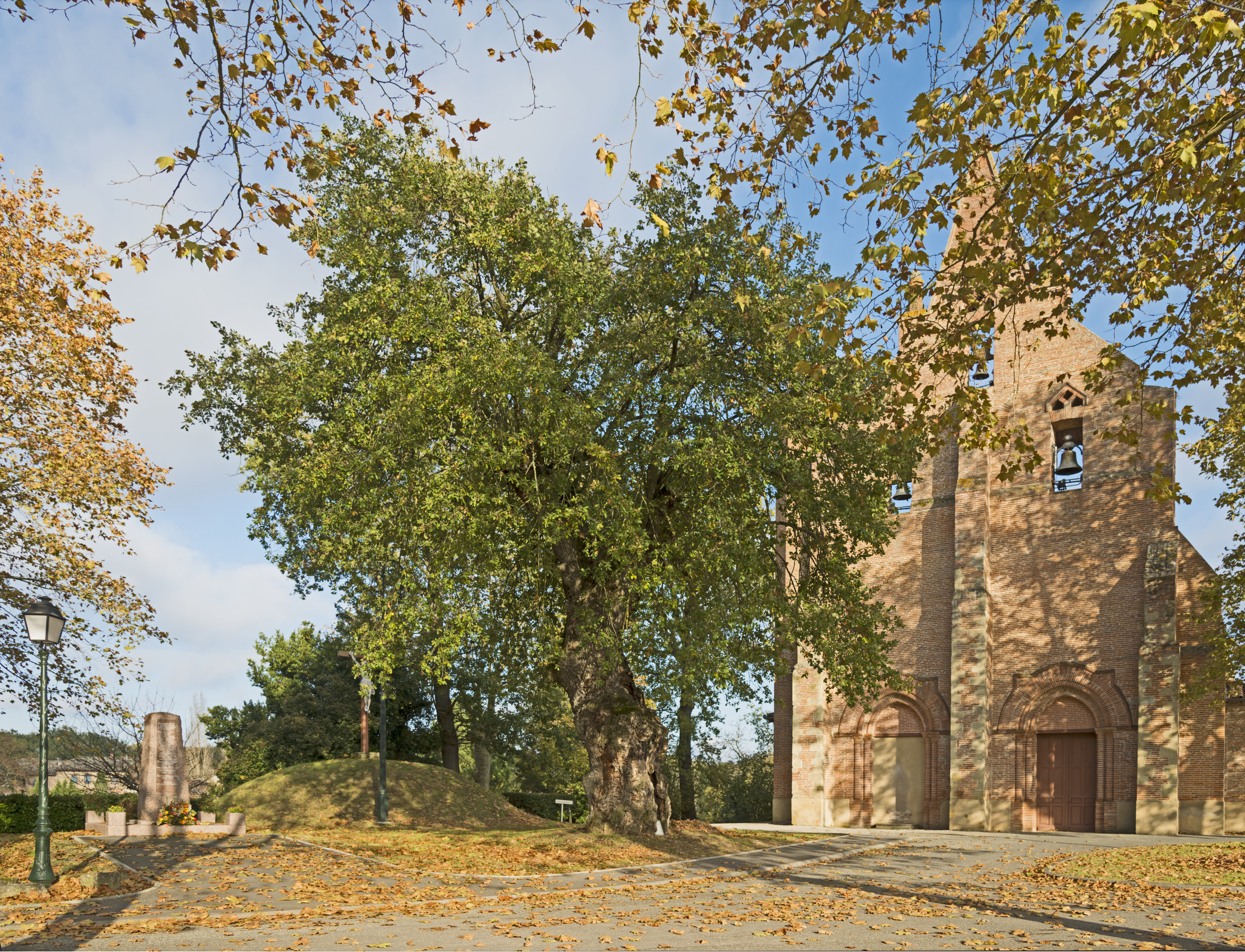
- The oak of Sully and the church in Villariès

- Coat of arms
- Location of Villariès
- Location within France Location within Occitanie
- Coordinates: 43°45′15″N 1°29′34″E
- Country: France
- Region: Occitania
- Department: Haute-Garonne
- Arrondissement: Toulouse
- Canton: Pechbonnieu

Government
  - Mayor (2020–2026): Léandre Roumagnac
- Area^{1}: 7.33 km^{2} (2.83 sq mi)
- Elevation: 180 m (590 ft)
- Highest elevation: 203 m (666 ft)
- Lowest elevation: 127 m (417 ft)
- Population (2023): 921
  - Density: 126/km^{2} (325/sq mi)
- Time zone: UTC+01:00 (CET)
  - Summer (DST): UTC+02:00 (CEST)
- INSEE/Postal code: 31579 /31380
- ^{1} French Land Register data, which excludes lakes, ponds, glaciers > 1 km^{2} (0.386 sq mi or 247 acres) and river estuaries.

Villariès (French pronunciation: [vilaʁjɛs]; Occitan: Vilariès) is a commune in the Haute-Garonne department in southwestern France.

== Population ==
Historical population
Year	Pop.	±% p.a.
1968	208	—
1975	239	+2.00%
1982	377	+6.73%
1990	523	+4.18%
1999	592	+1.39%
2007	796	+3.77%
2012	821	+0.62%
2017	792	−0.72%
2023	921	+2.55%
Source: INSEE

== Sights ==
The Château de Jean is a château built on the site of an older castle and listed since 1998 as a historic site by the French Ministry of Culture.

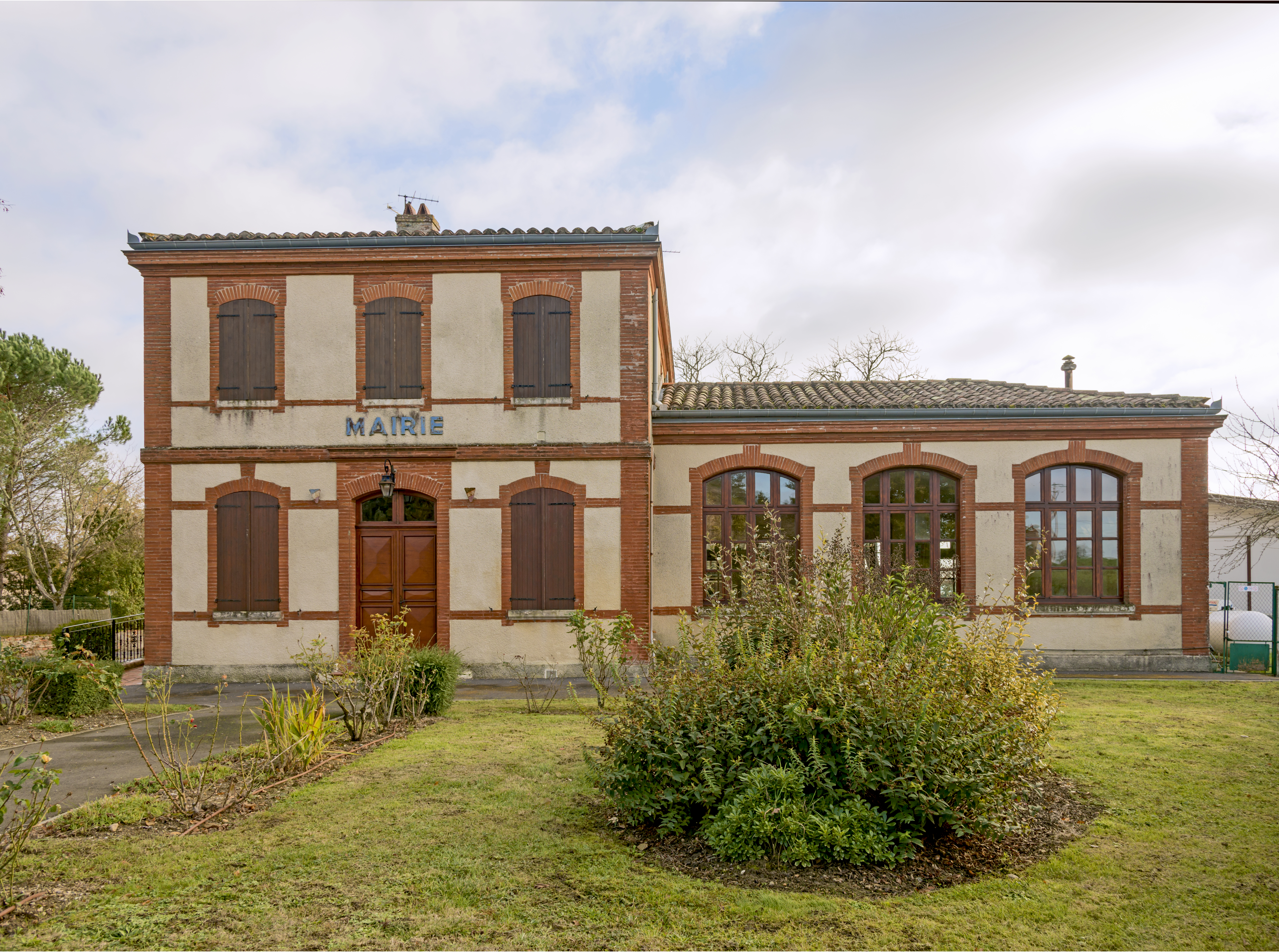
Town hall

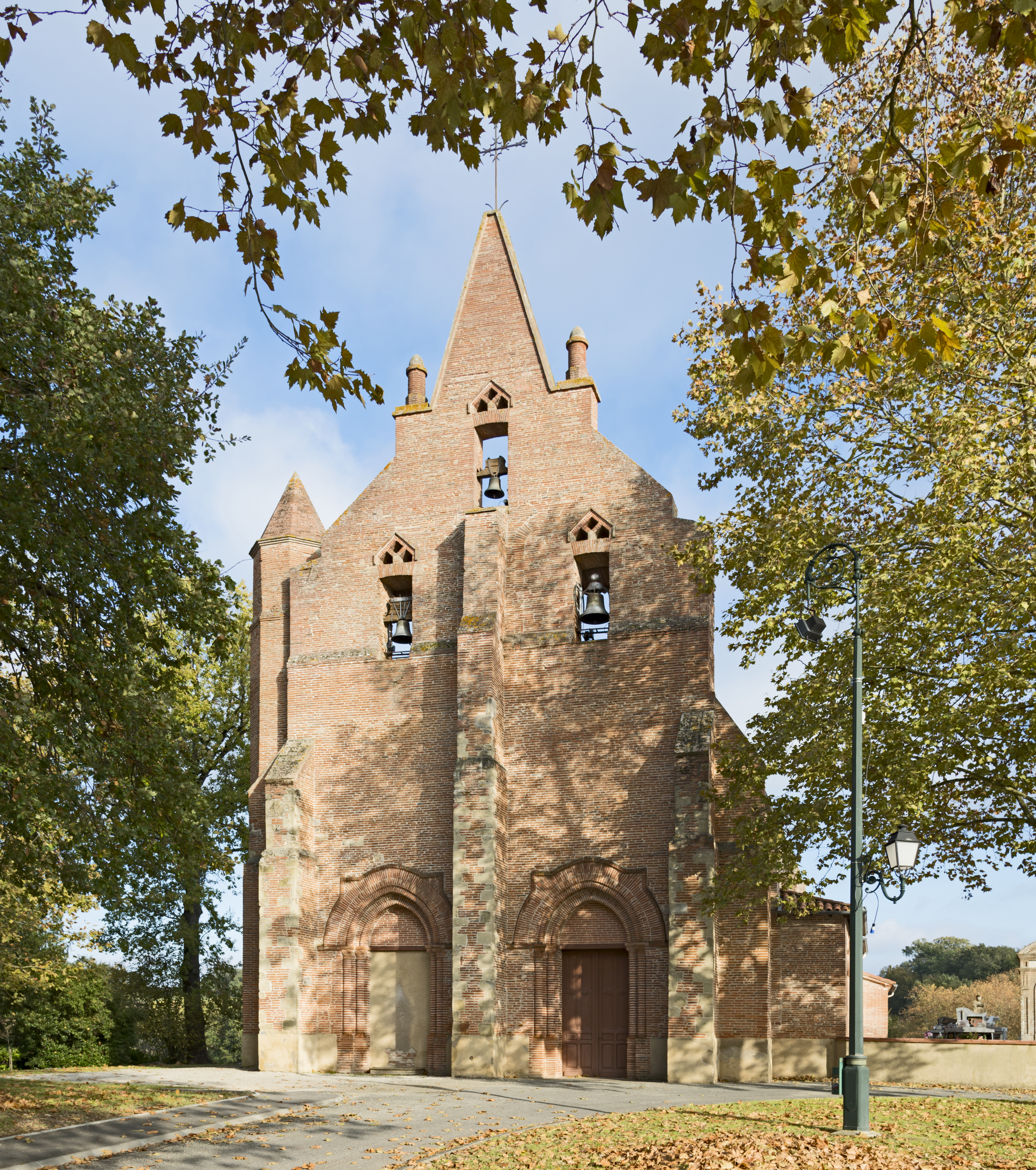
Church

== See also ==
- Communes of the Haute-Garonne department
