= Murder hole =

Hole in the ceiling of a gateway or passageway

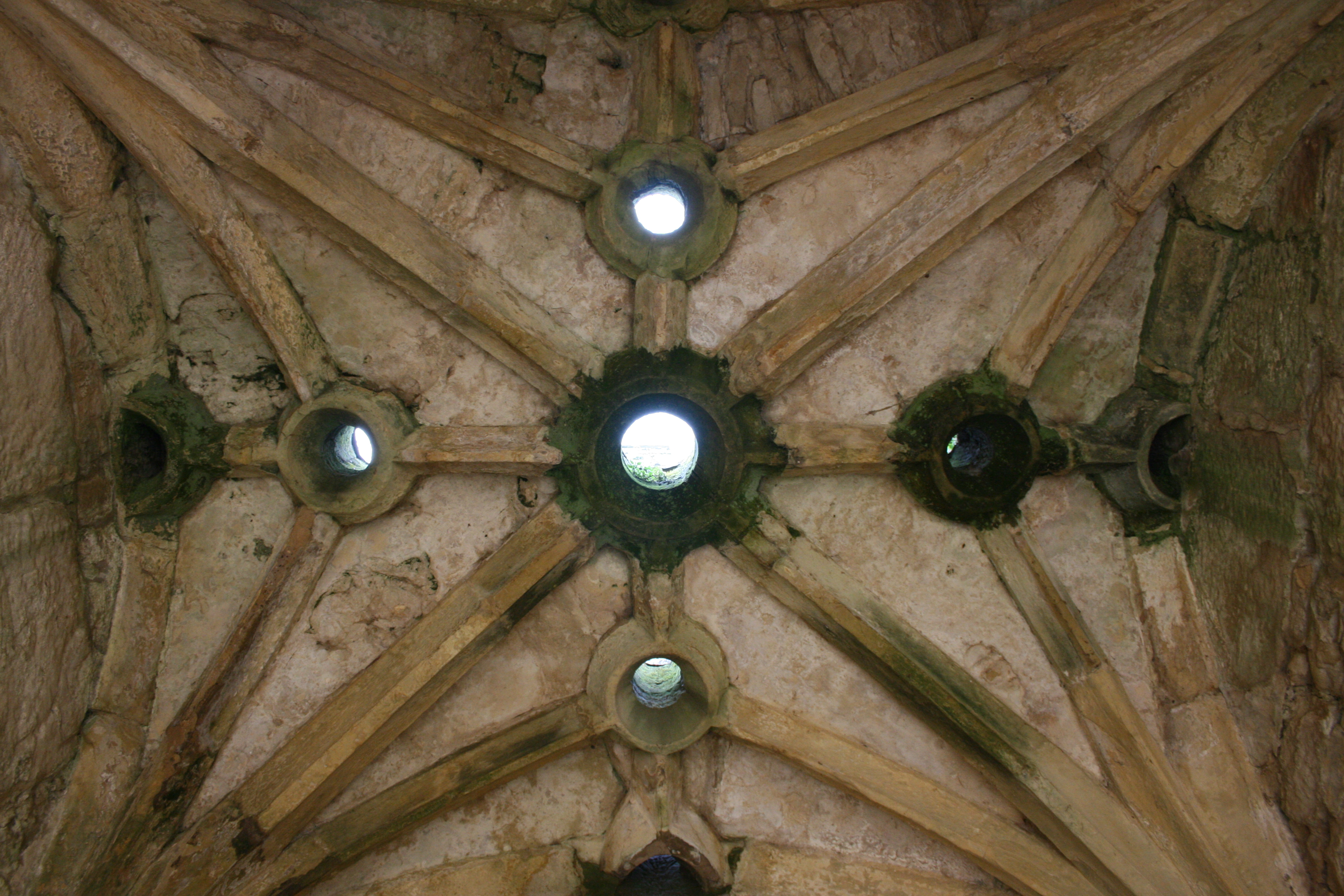
Murder holes at Bodiam Castle

A murder hole or meurtrière is a hole in the ceiling of a gateway or passageway in a fortification through which the defenders could shoot, throw or pour harmful substances or objects such as rocks, arrows, scalding water, hot sand, quicklime, or hot oil (rarely used because of its cost), down on attackers.

== Murder holes and machicolations ==
Similar holes, called machicolations, were often located in the curtain walls of castles, fortified manor houses, and city walls. The parapet would project over corbels so that holes would be located over the exterior face of the wall, allowing the defenders to target attackers at the base of the wall. The primary difference between these two features is in their location. Murder holes were located on the interiors of castles and other fortified buildings at the entranceway. Their supposed intention was to discourage (or kill) invaders once they had breached the walls, though it has been suggested that they may have in some cases also facilitated more prosaic activities, such as communication between levels. For example, the murder hole at Audley's Castle in County Down, Northern Ireland is located not over the main threshold, but over the entry way to an interior room.

== Location ==
In tower houses, which can be seen as small castles, the most common location for murder holes is over the lobby, equivalent to the gatehouse of a true castle. Most, if not all, murder holes have only a restricted view of the lobbies below, supporting the idea that other uses may have been common. However, murder holes have been documented in a variety of areas within fortified buildings, and there is no completely reliable formula for their placement. The murder hole in Tully Castle, County Fermanagh, Northern Ireland is in the central portion of the first floor of the house, west of a cross-wall and piercing the vault of the lower chamber.

== See also ==
- Arrow slit
- Bretèche
- Hoarding
- Merlon
- Quenching hole in e.g. Boghead (bastle)
