= Edward Charlton (historian) =

English physician & historian (1814–1874)

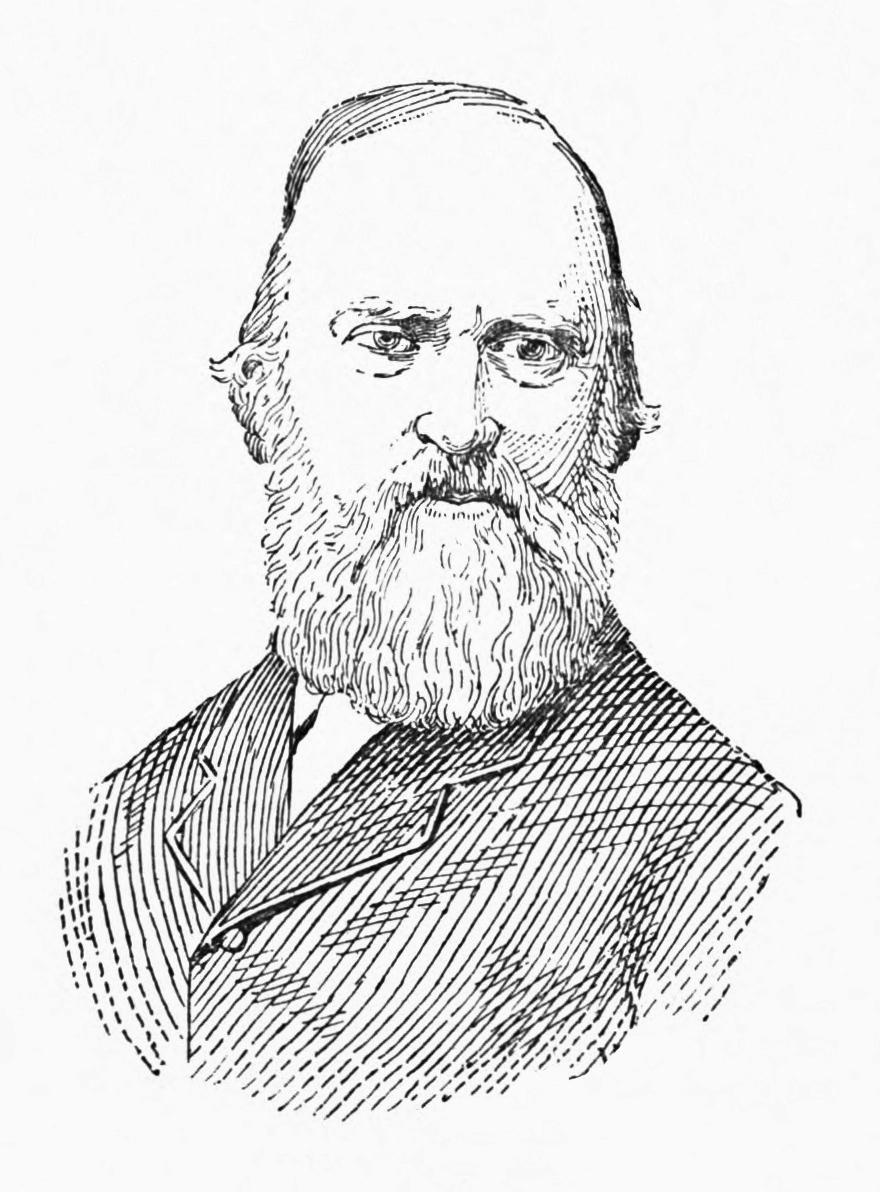
Edward Charlton, M.D.

Edward Charlton (24 July 1814 – 14 May 1874) was an English physician, writer and historian.

Born in Bellingham, Northumberland, he contributed to journals of the Society of Antiquaries of Newcastle upon Tyne.

In 1872 he succeeded Dr. Dennis Embleton as Professor of Medicine at University of Durham College of Medicine.

== Works ==
In 1870 his book Memorials of North Tynedale and its four surnames was published. It discussed the "chief" four clans in the area (the Charltons, Robsons, Dodds and Mylborne), and is an introduction to the subject of the Border Reivers. It raised the subject that for every family "there be certeyne hedesman that leadeth and answereth all for the rest".

=== Contributions to the Society of Antiquaries of Newcastle upon Tyne ===
To "Archaeologia aeliana, or, Miscellaneous tracts relating to antiquity" – Published by the Society of Antiquaries of Newcastle upon Tyne - 1861. New series, Volume V, Printed by William Dodd, Number 6 Bigg Market, Newcastle upon Tyne: Sold by J Q Forster, Clayton Street, 1861 This included articles entitled :-

- Early German versions of the Bible on page 91
- Drinking Tripods - (jointly written by Mr Way) - on page 11
- North Tynedale in the sixteenth century – on page 118
- Ancient vases from Malta – on page 131
- Roman bridge at Cilurnum – on page 142, 148
- Inlaid Spearhead – on page 143
- Instruments of the Saxon Period found near Lanchester – on page 159
- Dagger from Muggleswick – on page 170
- Chalice from Hexham – on page 170

=== Contributions to "Archaeologia aeliana" ===
This book, alternatively titled "or Miscellaneous tracts relating to antiquity" – Published by the Society of Antiquaries of Newcastle upon Tyne - 1865. New series, Volume VI, Printed by William Dodd, Number 6 Bigg Market, Newcastle upon Tyne: Sold by J Q Forster, Clayton Street, 1865 This included articles entitled :-

- Ms. Of Gower's "Cconfession Amantis" – on page 12
- Old Recipes – on page 17
- Jacobite relics of 1715 and 1745 – on page 29
- Ecclesiastical vestments – on page 34
- Gold ornament found in North Tynedale – on page 48
- The Roman bridge of Cilurnum(with plan and view.) – on page 80
- Reverse of the seal of Dunfermlin Abbey – on page 106
- The Orkney Rvnes (with illustrations.) - on page127, 184
- Ancient Breviary – on page 149
- Roman caricature of Christianity (with facsimile.) – on page 198
- Abstract of Will of Christopher Milbourne – on page 232

All are described in the index as being written by Dr. Charlton and above each paper by Edward Charlton M.D.

== See also ==
- Geordie dialect words
