= Kielderhead and Emblehope Moors =

Moorland area in Northumberland, England

- Moorlands
- Location within Northumberland
- Coordinates: 55.253°N 2.403°W
- Grid position: NY745955
- Location: Northumberland, England

Kielderhead and Emblehope Moors are contiguous areas of moorland in northern Northumberland, England. A section of Kielderhead Moor is part of neighbouring Scotland. The moors are classified as a Biological Site of Special Scientific Interest (SSSI) by the UK government.

== Kielderhead ==
Kielderhead is 43 square kilometres of upland moorland in northern Northumberland. The moor straddles the English / Scottish border. Kielderhead is owned and managed by the Forestry Commission and is a Site of Special Scientific Interest (SSSI).

== Emblehope ==
Emblehope is 39.5 square kilometres of upland moorland Site of Special Scientific Interest (SSSI) contiguous with Kielderhead. This portion of the moorland is owned and managed by the estate of the Duke of Northumberland.
