= Herman Ramm =

British archaeologist (1922–1991)

Herman Gabriel Ramm OBE FSA (9 May 1922 – 30 November 1991) was an archaeologist.

== Biography ==
Ramm was educated at Liverpool College. In 1940 he enrolled at University College, Oxford to study Classics. His undergraduate degree was interrupted by Ramm serving in the Royal Artillery during the Second World War. He completed the course after the end of the war. In 1947 he was appointed as a tutor in Philosophy and Greek at St John's College, Durham.

In 1948 he joined the Royal Commission on Historical Monuments in York, where he worked for the rest of his career. Much of Ramm's archaeological work was undertaken in the city of York on behalf of the RCHM and the Ministry of Works. In 1955 he excavated part of the defences of Eboracum to establish their historical development. He provided significant contributions to the RCHME volume on Eboracum (1962) and to the Victoria County History of York.

Primarily he researched and worked on Roman and Prehistoric sites, but Ramm made two major contributions to Post-Medieval archaeology: his work on the defences at Newark during the Civil War, and his work on Northumbrian settlements. The latter was published in a 1970 monograph Shielings and bastles. Ramm's 1978 publication on The Parisi was the first substantial work dealing solely with this Iron Age tribe and its origins.

Ramm joined the Yorkshire Philosophical Society (YPS) in the 1950s and served as a member of its council from 1956 onwards. He was elected as a Life Vice-President of the YPS in 1969. An annual memorial prize of £400 is issued in his name by the YPS to a postgraduate student at the University of York who has submitted the best dissertation on an archaeological subject that year.

He was awarded an OBE in the 1972 Birthday Honours through his work as an investigator for the RCHME.

Ramm died in 1991 and is buried at Fulford Cemetery.

== Select publications ==
- Ramm, H. G. 1952. "Roman camps on Bootham Stray, York", Annual Report of the Yorkshire Philosophical Society, 15.
- Ramm, H. G. 1953-1954. "A note on the finding of the Roman road at No. 278 Tadcaster Road, York, 1953", Proceedings of the York Archaeological and Yorkshire Architectural Society 10.
- Ramm, H. G. 1958. "Roman Burials from Castle Yard, York", York Archaeological Journal 39, 400.
- Ramm, H. G. 1961. "Romano-British Antiquities", in Tillott, P. M. (ed) A History of Yorkshire: The City of York (Victoria County History of the Counties of England). London, Oxford University Press & Institute for Historical Research. 322-331.
- Ramm, H. G. 1971. Roman York From A.D. 71: A Pictorial Guide. York, Yorkshire Archaeological and York Archaeological Society.
- Ramm, H. G., McDowall, R. W., Mercer, E. 1970. Shielings and bastles, London, Royal Commission on Historical Monuments (England).
- Ramm, H. G. 1971. "The Tombs of Archbishops Walter de Gray (1216–55) and Godfrey de Ludham (1258–65) in York Minster, and their Contents", Archaeologia 103, 101-147.
- Ramm, H. G. 1976. "The Origins of York", Annual Report of the Yorkshire Philosophical Society. 59-63.
- Ramm, H. G. 1976. "The Roman Roads West of Tadcaster", York Historian 1
- Ramm, H. G. 1978. The Parisi. Duckworth.
- Ramm, H. G. 1978. "Obituary – George Francis Willmot", Annual Report of the Yorkshire Philosophical Society, 5.
