= Black Middens Bastle House =

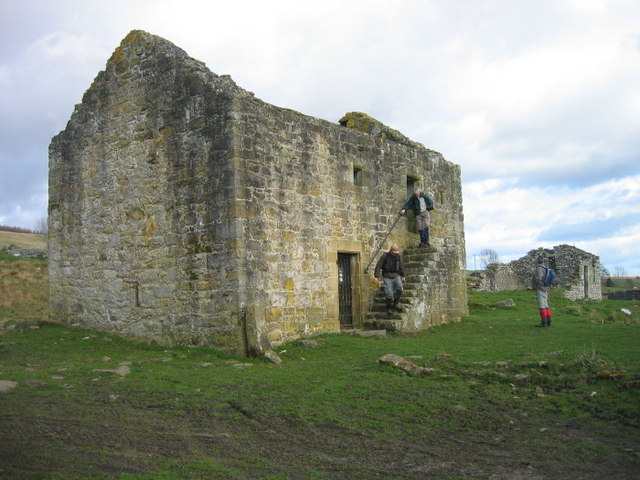
- Black Middens Bastle

- Location in Northumberland

General information
- Location: Northumberland, England, UK
- Coordinates: 55.2036°N 2.3580°W
- OS grid: NY773900

Black Middens Bastle House lies about 7 miles (11 km) northwest of Bellingham, Northumberland. It is a two-storey fortified stone farmhouse from the 16th century. In times of trouble from border reivers, which were common on the English-Scottish border, farmers could hide behind its thick walls. Livestock would be kept downstairs and the farmers' families upstairs.

The original door was blocked over and three additional doors and an external staircase were eventually added, and the roof lost. Nearby on the property is an 18th-century stone cottage.

The house, cottage, and grounds are owned and administered by English Heritage.
