= Boghead, South Lanarkshire =

Coordinates: 55.656°N 3.942°W

Boghead
- Location within South Lanarkshire
- Population: Approximately 200
- OS grid reference: NS779419
- Council area: South Lanarkshire
- Country: Scotland
- Sovereign state: United Kingdom
- Post town: LANARK
- Postcode district: ML11
- Dialling code: 01555
- Police: Scotland
- Fire: Scottish
- Ambulance: Scottish
- UK Parliament: Hamilton and Clyde Valley
- Scottish Parliament: Clydesdale

Boghead is a small village in South Lanarkshire, west central Scotland. It is about 23 miles (37 km) southeast of Glasgow and sits nearby to the River Nethan and Avon Water. Boghead is a residential area, with working residents commuting to nearby villages and large towns of Lesmahagow, Strathaven and Lanark. It is composed of houses built along Strathaven Road (the B7086) and Lesmahagow Road. It originated in the early 19th century around the old Blackwood Estate, as the original inhabitants used to work there.

== Bent Primary ==
Bent Primary is a primary school situated 1 mile (1.6 km) east of Boghead on the A726. The school is mainly attended by children from Boghead and other close villages and is a Mixed school of Non Denominational religion. It is for pupils aged 5 years old through 11, and its Local Education Authority is South Lanarkshire.

== Businesses in Boghead ==
From 1926 to the present day, there was a haulage company called "Richard Bell & Sons". This company transported cattle and other animals around Scotland, with its base being in Boghead. It was a family business through the years, until its sale in 2000 to one of its employees. The business is still running under the title "Richard Bell & Sons", however its current owner resides outside the village in Brocketsbrae.

Owen Pilling Graphics Ltd, one of the UK's leading manufacturers in vehicle graphics and design, was set up and based adjoining the owner's house in Boghead. OPG have recently moved out from Boghead, and their business is now located in Lesmahagow.
