= Gwilt =

Gwilt is a surname. Notable people with the name include:

- Ayesha Gwilt (born 1989), English actress
- George Gwilt (1746—1807), "George Gwilt the Elder", English architect
- George Gwilt the younger (1775—1856), English architect and writer on architecture
- James Gwilt (born 1986), Australian rules footballer
- Joseph Gwilt (1784—1863), English architect and writer
- Martin Gwilt Jolley (1859—1916), English painter
