= Mole Valley District Council elections =

Local government elections in Surrey, England

Map of Mole Valley district, showing the political composition of the council after the 2024 Election. Liberal Democrats in yellow, Ashtead Independents in grey and Conservatives in blue.

Mole Valley District Council in Surrey, England was elected on a four year cycle, with a third of the council elected at each election. The council is due to be abolished on 1 April 2027 following structural changes to local government in Surrey.

== Election results ==
Composition of the council
Year	Conservative	Liberal Democrats (Note: Includes totals for the predecessors of the Liberal Democrats, the Liberal Party and SDP (both of which participated in the Alliance).)	Labour	Independents & Others	Council control after election
Local government reorganisation; council established (41 seats)
1973	16	5	2	18	No overall control
New ward boundaries (41 seats)
1976	18	2	1	20	No overall control
1978	20	2	1	18	No overall control
1979	19	2	1	19	No overall control
1980	16	2	1	22	Independent
1982	16	4	1	20	No overall control
1983	15	5	1	20	No overall control
1984	17	7	1	16	No overall control
1986	15	9	1	16	No overall control
1987	15	11	1	14	No overall control
1988	17	9	1	14	No overall control
1990	14	12	1	14	No overall control
1991	13	15	1	12	No overall control
1992	14	17	1	9	No overall control
1994	11	21	1	8	Liberal Democrats
1995	11	20	2	8	No overall control
1996	11	19	2	9	No overall control
1998	14	16	2	9	No overall control
1999	17	16	1	7	No overall control
New ward boundaries (41 seats)
2000	19	14	1	7	No overall control
2002	18	15	1	7	No overall control
2003	19	15	1	7	No overall control
2004	19	17	0	5	No overall control
2006	22	16	0	3	Conservative
2007	22	16	0	3	Conservative
2008	22	16	0	3	No overall control
2010	18	17	0	6	No overall control
2011	17	18	0	6	No overall control
2012	16	19	0	6	No overall control
2014	19	15	0	7 (Note: Including 1 UKIP)	No overall control
2015	25	10	0	6	Conservative
2016	24	12	0	5	Conservative
2018	20	14	0	7	No overall control
2019	12	22	0	7	Liberal Democrats
2021	12	22	0	7	Liberal Democrats
2022	10	24	0	7	Liberal Democrats
New ward boundaries (39 seats)
2023	3	30	0	6	Liberal Democrats
2024	2	31	0	6	Liberal Democrats

== Results maps ==
2002 results map

2003 results map

2004 results map

2006 results map

2007 results map

2008 results map

2010 results map

2011 results map

2012 results map

2014 results map

2015 results map

2016 results map

2018 results map

2019 results map

2021 results map

2022 results map

2023 results map

2024 results map

== By-election results ==
=== 1994–1998 ===
Bookham North By-Election 4 July 1996
Party	Candidate	Votes	%	±%
Conservative		1,117	61.8	
Liberal Democrats		689	38.2	
Majority		428	23.6	
Turnout		1,806	47.3	
Conservative gain from Liberal Democrats		Swing		

Holmwood & Beare Green By-Election 20 November 1997
Party	Candidate	Votes	%	±%
Liberal Democrats		461	51.2	−0.2
Conservative		401	44.5	+6.0
Labour		39	4.3	−5.8
Majority		60	6.7	
Turnout		901	41.0	
Liberal Democrats hold		Swing		

=== 2002–2006 ===
Bookham South By-Election 28 November 2002
Party	Candidate	Votes	%	±%
Liberal Democrats		945	53.8	−5.2
Conservative		702	40.0	+3.5
Labour		110	6.3	+1.8
Majority		243	13.8	
Turnout		1,757	40.7	
Liberal Democrats hold		Swing		

Dorking North By-Election 28 November 2002
Party	Candidate	Votes	%	±%
Liberal Democrats		701	57.6	+3.1
Conservative		447	36.7	−0.7
Labour		69	5.7	−2.4
Majority		254	20.9	
Turnout		1,217	40.2	
Liberal Democrats gain from Conservative		Swing		

=== 2010–2014 ===
Capel, Leigh and Newdigate by-Election 21 October 2010
Party	Candidate	Votes	%	±%
Liberal Democrats	Iain Murdoch	618	46.3	+5.1
Conservative	Corinna Osborne-Patterson	558	41.8	−5.8
UKIP	Tim Bowling	97	7.3	+0.6
Green	Jacqui Hamlin	61	4.6	+0.1
Majority		60	4.5	
Turnout		1,334		
Liberal Democrats gain from Conservative		Swing		

Bookham South by-Election 18 October 2011
Party	Candidate	Votes	%	±%
Liberal Democrats	Stella Brooks	1,043	47.2	+2.6
Conservative	Gail Collett	940	42.5	−4.4
UKIP	Bob Cane	228	10.3	+1.8
Majority		103	4.7	
Turnout		2,211		
Liberal Democrats hold		Swing		

Mickleham, Westhumble and Pixham by-Election 26 September 2013
Party	Candidate	Votes	%	±%
Liberal Democrats	Roger Hurst	423	55.7	+4.3
Conservative	Duncan Irvine	236	31.1	−10.5
UKIP	Adrian Daniels	101	13.3	+6.4
Majority		187	24.6	
Turnout		760		
Liberal Democrats hold		Swing		

=== 2014–2018 ===
Leatherhead North by-Election 30 June 2016
Party	Candidate	Votes	%	±%
Liberal Democrats	Joe Crome	862	56.6	+23.2
Conservative	Tracy Lorraine Keeley	340	22.3	−6.3
UKIP	Simon Chambers	157	10.3	−7.3
Labour	Marc Patrick Green	135	8.9	−7.3
Green	Vicki Elcoate	28	1.8	−2.3
Majority		522	34.3	
Turnout		1,524	30.1	
Liberal Democrats gain from Conservative		Swing		

=== 2022–2026 ===
Charlwood By-Election 7 July 2022
Party	Candidate	Votes	%	±%
Green	Lisa Scott	284	41.7	
Liberal Democrats	Mike Ward	210	30.8	
Conservative	Corinna Osborne-Patterson	166	24.4	
Labour	Laurence Nasskau	21	3.1	
Majority		74	10.9	
Turnout		681		
Green gain from Conservative		Swing		

Holmwoods and Beare Green By-Election 20 March 2025
Party	Candidate	Votes	%	±%
Liberal Democrats	Bradley Nelson	748	46.5	+1.1
Conservative	Michelle Watson	437	27.2	−2.8
Reform	Michael Carter	348	21.6	+11.5
Green	Lisa Scott	76	4.7	−3.6
Majority		311	19.3	
Turnout		1,609		
Liberal Democrats hold		Swing		

Bookham East and Eastwick Park By-Election 10 July 2025
Party	Candidate	Votes	%	±%
Liberal Democrats	Lawrence Penney	1,056	56.0	−6.6
Reform	Richard Granville	387	20.5	+20.5
Conservative	Louise Calland	386	20.5	−10.5
Green	Gerard Bolton	56	3.0	−1.4
Majority		669	35.5	
Turnout		1,885		
Liberal Democrats hold		Swing		
