= Newington Gardens =

Park in London, England

Coordinates: 51°29′51″N 0°5′45″W

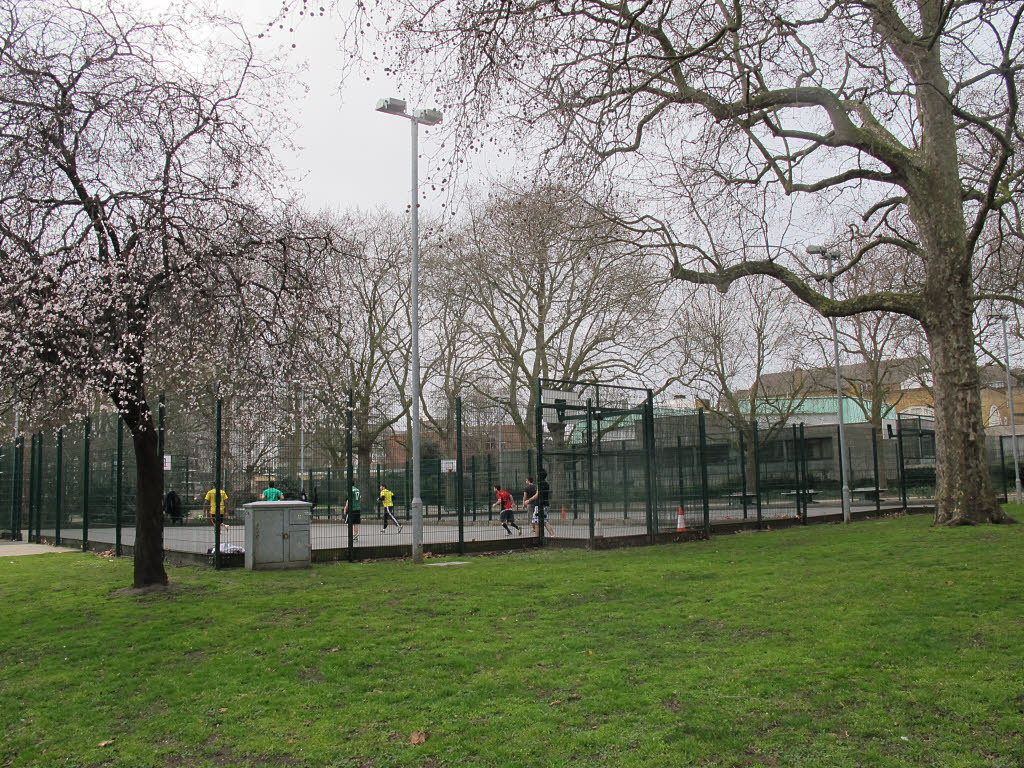
Newington Gardens

Newington Gardens is located on Harper Road in Southwark, London, England. To the north-west is the Inner London Sessions House, used by the Crown Court. Its area is 1.697 hectares (4.19 acres). The park occupies part of the site of an old prison that was closed in 1878. The park was opened by Catherine Gladstone, wife of the then prime minister, on 5 May 1884.

The park occupies the site where Horsemonger Lane Gaol was located for almost a century from 1791. Designed by George Gwilt the Elder, architect surveyor to the county of Surrey, this was once the largest prison in the county.

The MUGA (Multi-Use Games Area) courts in the park are regularly used by the London Hardcourt Bicycle Polo Association for casual games and tournaments.

== See also ==
- Newington, London
- Newington Causeway
