= Woodhatch Place =

County building in Reigate, Surrey, England

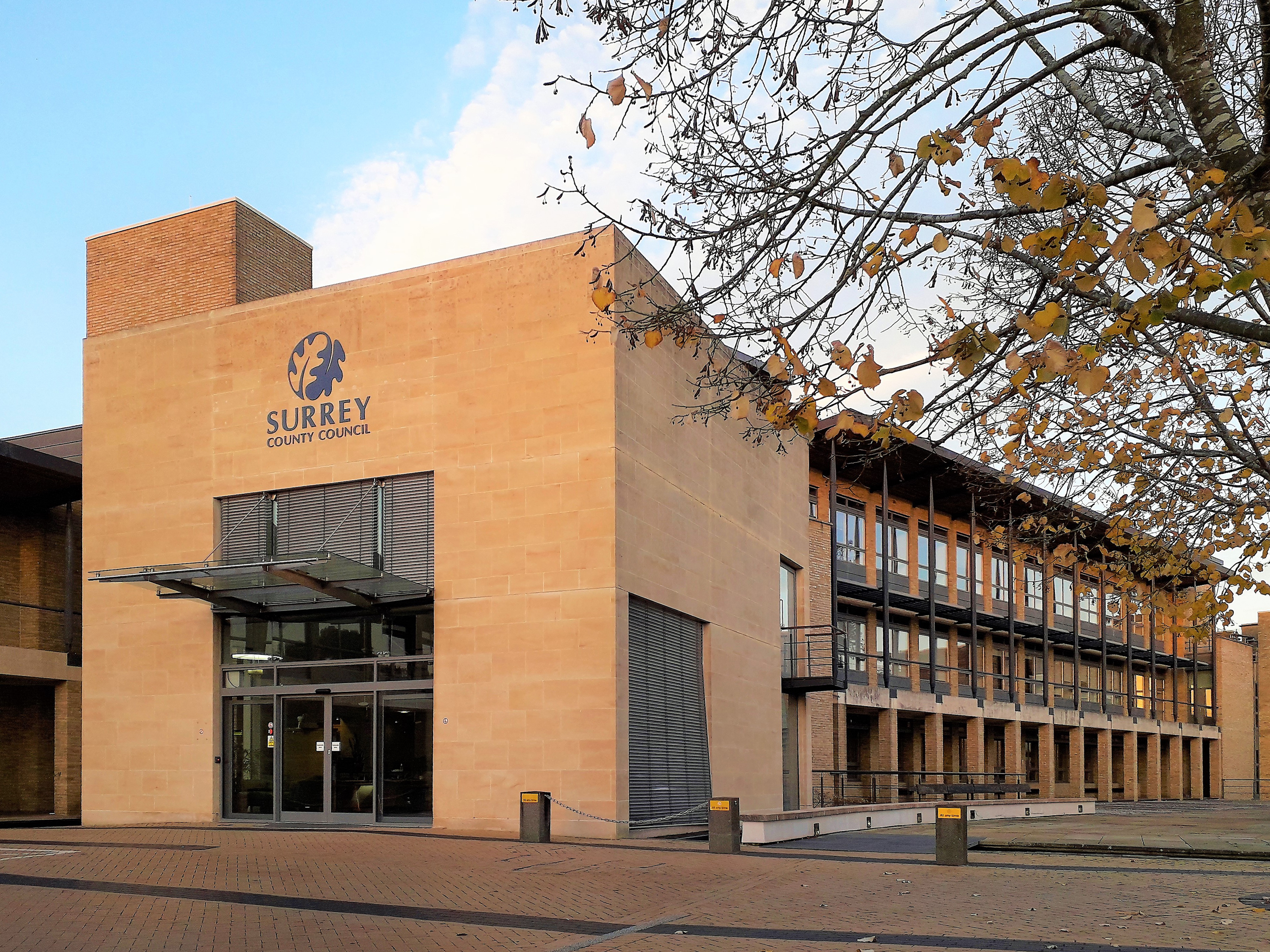

- Location within Surrey

General information
- Architectural style: Modern
- Location: Woodhatch Place; 11 Cockshot Hill; Reigate; RH2 8EF, Reigate, United Kingdom
- Coordinates: 51.2277°N 0.1997°W
- Completed: 1999

Woodhatch Place is a large office building on Cockshot Hill, Reigate, Surrey, England, which serves as the headquarters of Surrey County Council. The main building was built in 1998–1999 as the head office of Canon (UK) Limited, in the grounds of a Georgian house, previously called Woodhatch Lodge, with the original house being retained and restored as part of the development. The complex was bought by Surrey County Council in 2020 and converted to become the council's main offices and meeting place.

== History ==
Surrey County Council was created in 1889 under the Local Government Act 1888. It initially met at the Surrey County Sessions House in Newington, in the southern suburbs of London, where the Surrey Quarter Sessions had been held since 1791. Newington had previously been in Surrey, but was transferred to the newly created County of London at the same time that Surrey County Council was created. The county council chose to leave Newington and move to premises within the administrative county of Surrey, and so built County Hall, Kingston upon Thames, which opened in 1893.

Under the London Government Act 1963, Kingston upon Thames was transferred into Greater London in 1965, and so Surrey County Council again found itself based in the administrative area of London rather than in the administrative county that it served; a situation that continued for the next 55 years after the boundary change. The county council considered various options over that time for moving its headquarters to premises within Surrey, but remained based at County Hall until 2020. It eventually decided to move to Reigate, acquiring Woodhatch Place in July 2020.

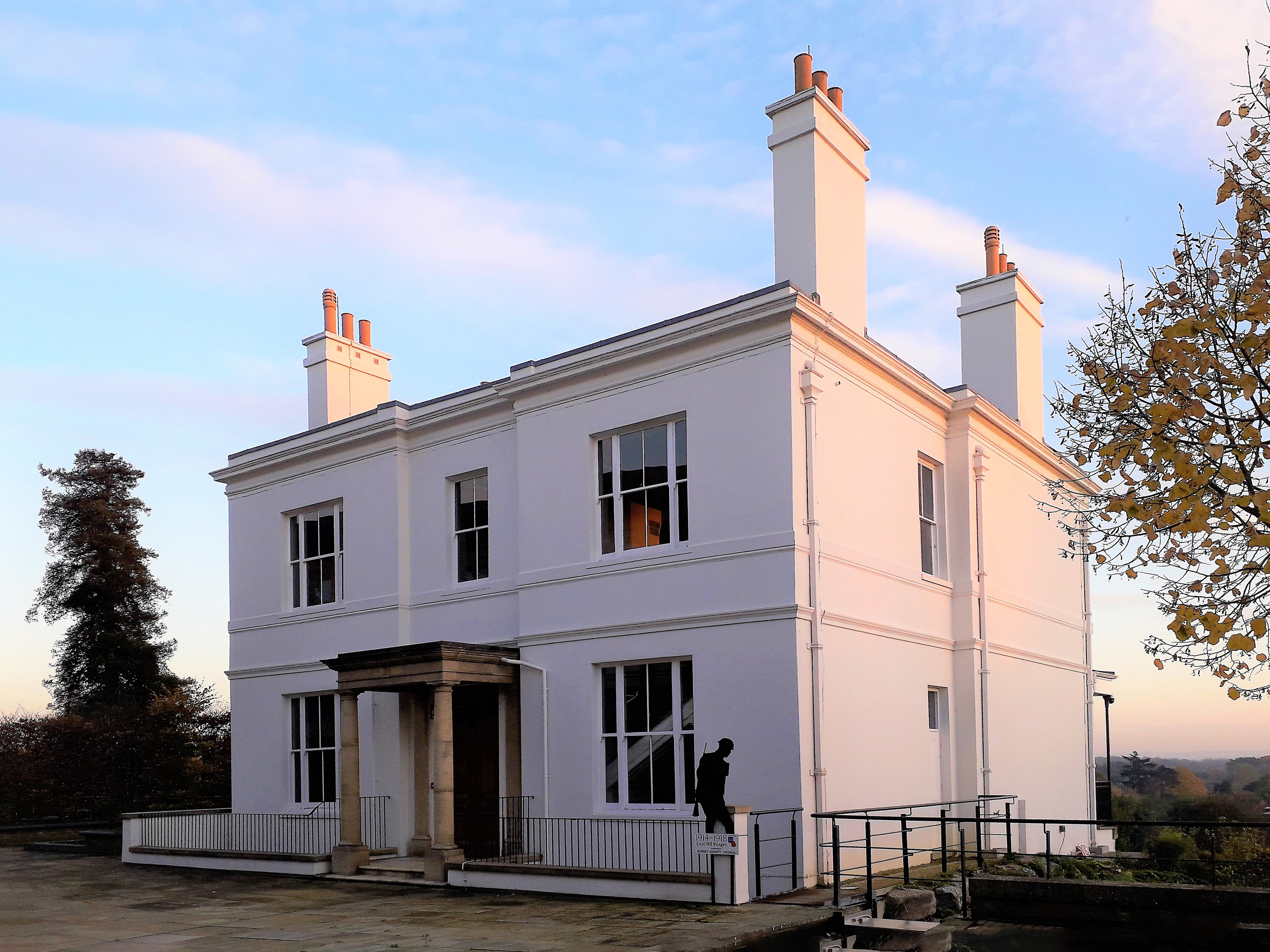
Old Woodhatch Lodge

The original house of Woodhatch Lodge is believed to have been built in the late eighteenth century, although the exact date of construction is unknown. It remained a private house set in private gardens and wooded grounds until the 1930s. The house was substantially extended in the Victorian era with additional wings added to the east and west of the original house. In 1939 it became the head office of the Mutual Property Life and General Insurance Company Limited, which changed its name to the Crusader Insurance Company Limited in 1946. Further office extensions were built to the north and east of the original house during the time the site was owned by Crusader.

Crusader moved its head office to Greenock in Scotland in 1989, and shortly afterwards the company was bought by Britannia Life. The Woodhatch Lodge site was next occupied by Canon (UK) Limited. In 1996 Canon secured planning permission to demolish the mid-twentieth century offices that had been built by Crusader and the Victorian wings of the house, restoring the original Georgian part of the house and building a large new office building to the north and east of the house. The new building was built 1998–1999, and was in use from August 1999. It was formally opened by Prince Philip, Duke of Edinburgh, on 27 April 2000. Following Canon's reconstruction, the site became known as "Woodhatch Place" rather than "Woodhatch Lodge". (Note: Until the early twentieth century, there had previously been another property nearby with the name "Woodhatch Place", being a large house about 300 metres south of Woodhatch Lodge, on the site now occupied by Vogan Close.)

In June 2019, Canon announced that it would be vacating Woodhatch, relocating to Uxbridge where other divisions of the company were already based.

By the time Surrey County Council bought Woodhatch Place in July 2020, it had already held its final full council meeting at County Hall in Kingston, on 17 March 2020, as meetings in the latter part of 2020 were held online due to the COVID-19 pandemic. When the county council bought Woodhatch, it was yet to be decided whether it would be the council's headquarters or a subsidiary office. In October 2020 the council decided that Woodhatch would be the council's headquarters with effect from 1 January 2021. The council held its first meeting at Woodhatch Place on 25 May 2021.
