= County Hall, London (disambiguation) =

County Hall, London in Lambeth is the former headquarters of the London County Council and the Greater London Council

County Hall, London could also refer to:

- County Hall, Kingston upon Thames, the former headquarters of the Surrey County Council
- County Hall, Newington, the former headquarters of the Surrey County Council
- Spring Gardens, Westminster, the former headquarters of the London County Council
- Middlesex Guildhall, Westminster, the former headquarters of the Middlesex County Council
