= Surrey CC v Bredero Homes Ltd =

English legal case concerning damages

Surrey CC v Bredero Homes Ltd. [1993] 3 All ER 705 is an English legal case relating to damages, in which two English councils, Surrey County Council and Mole Valley District Council, owned adjoining parcels of land. They sold the land in 1981 to developer Bredero Homes, subject to development covenants which stipulated conditions applicable to the development. The developer obtained planning permission subject to differing conditions, which allowed them to build more houses than the Councils' covenants would have permitted.

If the Councils had sold the land with the potential for more housing to be developed, they would have been able to charge more for the land. However, the legal rule that damages at common law pertain to the loss incurred by the injured party when a defendant has breached a contract was upheld, and as the Councils had suffered no loss their damages were only nominal, just £2.
