= Glory Wood and Devil's Den =

Nature reserve in Surrey, England

Coordinates: 51.222°N 0.322°W

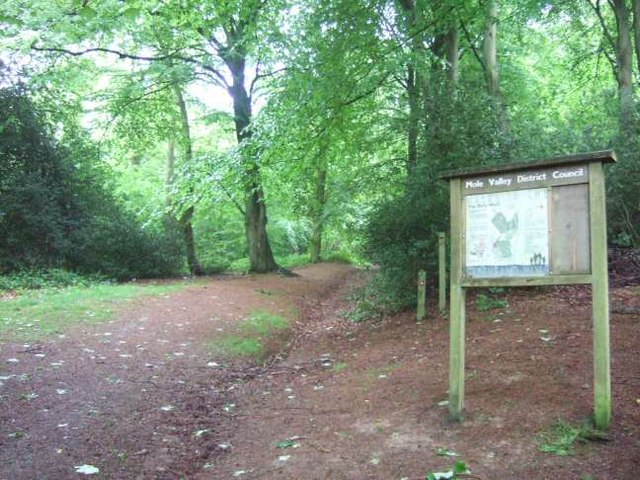
- Glory Wood
- Interactive map of Glory Wood and Devil's Den
- Type: Nature reserve
- Location: Dorking, Surrey
- OS grid: TQ173483
- Area: 13 hectares (32 acres)
- Manager: Surrey Wildlife Trust

Glory Wood and Devil's Den is a 13-hectare (32-acre) nature reserve south-east of Dorking in Surrey. It is owned by Mole Valley District Council, and was managed by the Surrey Wildlife Trust until 1 April 2019. There is a bowl barrow dating to the Late Neolithic or Bronze Age in Glory Wood.

The highest points of this wooded site have views over the North and South Downs. The main trees are oak and sweet chestnut and mammals include bats, roe deer, badgers and foxes.

There is access from Deepdene Avenue.

On 1 April 2019, Surrey Wildlife Trust notices were removed from the reserve's notice board and replaced with a notice stating that Mole Valley District Council was taking over management.
