= County Hall, Kingston upon Thames =

County building in Kingston upon Thames, Surrey, England

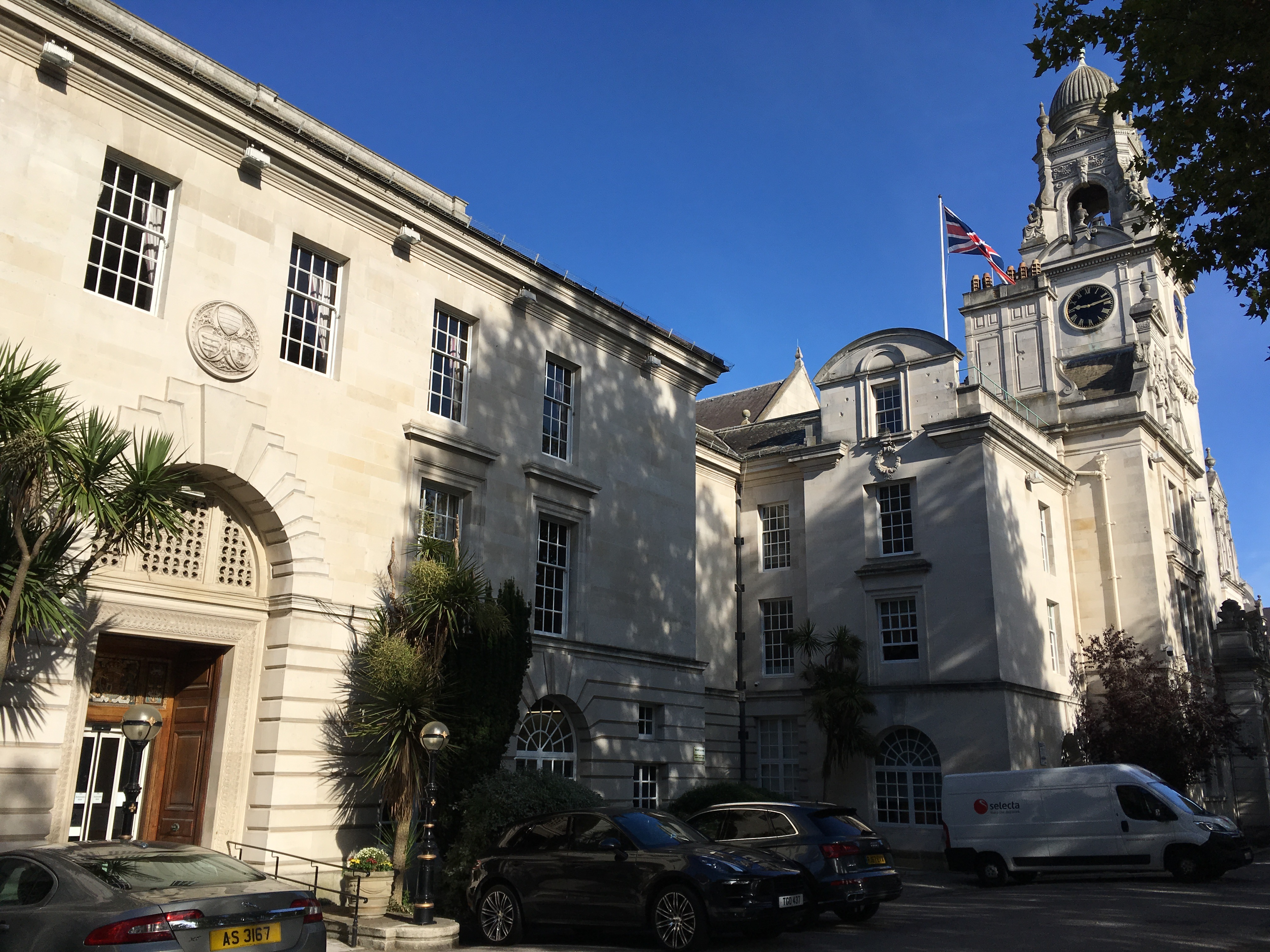
- County Hall

- Location within Greater London
- 51.4049°N 0.3051°W
- Location: Kingston upon Thames

History
- Built: 1893

Site notes
- Architect: Charles Henry Howell
- Architectural style: Classical style

Listed Building – Grade II
- Designated: 6 October 1983
- Reference no.: 1184834

County Hall is a former municipal building in Penrhyn Road, Kingston upon Thames, England. The building, which was the headquarters of Surrey County Council from 1893 to 2020, is a landmark in Kingston and is a Grade II listed building.

== History ==
The council chamber in County Hall

The building was commissioned to replace an earlier Sessions House at Newington Causeway in Newington which had been completed in 1791. Following the implementation of the Local Government Act 1888, which established councils in every county, it became necessary to find a meeting place for Surrey County Council. However, as Newington formed part of the County of London from 1889 and therefore lay outside the area administered by the council, county leaders chose to procure a new purpose-built county headquarters. By 1890, six towns were being considered: Epsom, Guildford, Kingston, Redhill, Surbiton, and Wimbledon. The site selected had previously formed part of the Woodbines Estate in Kingston.

Construction work on the new building began in 1891. It was designed by Charles Henry Howell, County Surveyor and partner in Howell and Brooks, in the classical style, was built by Higgs and Hill. The first meeting in the building was held on 17 October 1893, and it was officially opened with bands playing on 13 November 1893. The building was reported to have cost over £60,000. Access was from Grove Road, which was renamed Penrhyn Road, in honour of the first chairman of the county council, Edward Penrhyn. The design for the original building (the north east section of the current complex), which was faced in Portland stone, involved an asymmetrical main frontage with seven bays facing onto Penrhyn Road; the central section featured an arched doorway which was projected forward and a clock tower with a belfry and a dome above. There were sculptures by Farmer & Brindley on the face of the building. Inside the principal rooms were the council chamber and the clerk to the council's office.

An extension to the west of the original block, designed by E. Vincent Harris, was opened by the Duke of Gloucester in 1930. The Ashcombe Block, which created a quadrangle behind the original block, was completed in 1938. The Ashcombe Block was destroyed by a flying bomb in July 1944 and rebuilt in 1953. Further additions, which created a second quadrangle to the south, were completed in 1982.

Following local government reorganisation in 1965, County Hall was no longer within the administrative county of Surrey, but within the Royal Borough of Kingston upon Thames in Greater London. County leaders again developed ambitions to move the county administration to a location that was actually within the county of Surrey. In July 2003, the county council decided to procure new facilities in Woking in Surrey and to sell County Hall; that project, which would have been procured under a private finance initiative contract, was abandoned in January 2006 because of its high cost.

=== Redevelopment of site ===
In October 2020, the county council announced proposals to move to Woodhatch Place in Reigate and to sell County Hall in Kingston. The last full council meeting in the building had already been held, on 17 March 2020, with meetings in the latter part of 2020 being held online due to the COVID-19 pandemic. The council vacated County Hall in December 2020, and declared that Woodhatch Place would be the council's headquarters with effect from 1 January 2021.

The site and building were purchased by a developer, RER London, in March 2021. The company announced that it was planning "A high quality, residential led, mixed used development comprising residential units (including affordable housing) and commercial / community floorspace".

== Artworks ==
Works of art in County Hall included portraits of King George III and Queen Charlotte by Allan Ramsay and of the former Lord Lieutenant of Surrey, Lord Onslow, by Godfrey Kneller.

== Film location ==
Film and television productions that have made use of County Hall for location filming have included:

Films

- 102 Dalmatians (2000)
- Keeping Mum (2005)
- Vera Drake (2004)
- Legend (2015)

Television

- Ashes to Ashes
- The Bill
- Call the Midwife
- Criminal Justice
- Downton Abbey
- Jonathan Creek
- Midsomer Murders
- Saxondale
- Silent Witness
- Silk
- Top Boy
- The Wrong Mans
