= 2010 Mole Valley District Council election =

Local election in Surrey, UK

Results of the 2010 Mole Valley District Council election

Elections to Mole Valley District Council were held on 6 May 2010, alongside other local elections across England as well as the 2010 United Kingdom general election. 14 seats (one third) of the council were up for election. Following the election the Conservatives lost the council to no overall control.

== Results ==
Party	Previous	Seats +/-	2010
Conservative	22	▼4	18
Liberal Democrat	14	▲3	17
Others	5	▲1	6

== See also ==
- Mole Valley District Council elections
