= Surrey County Council =

English principal local authority

Type
- Type: Non-metropolitan county

History
- Founded: 1 April 1889
- Disbanded: 1 April 2027
- Succeeded by: East Surrey Council, West Surrey Council

Leadership
- Chair: Tim Hall, Conservative since 20 May 2025
- Leader: Tim Oliver, Conservative since 11 December 2018
- Chief Executive: Terence Herbert since 19 August 2024

Structure
- Seats: 81 councillors
- Political groups: Administration (39) Conservative (39) Other parties (42) Liberal Democrats (19) Residents (12) Independent (4) Reform UK (3) Green (2) Labour (2)
- Length of term: 4 years (extended to 6 years due to Unitarisation.
- Salary: No salary, but an annual taxable basic allowance of £14,160

Elections
- Voting system: First past the post
- First election: January 1889
- Last election: 6 May 2021

Meeting place
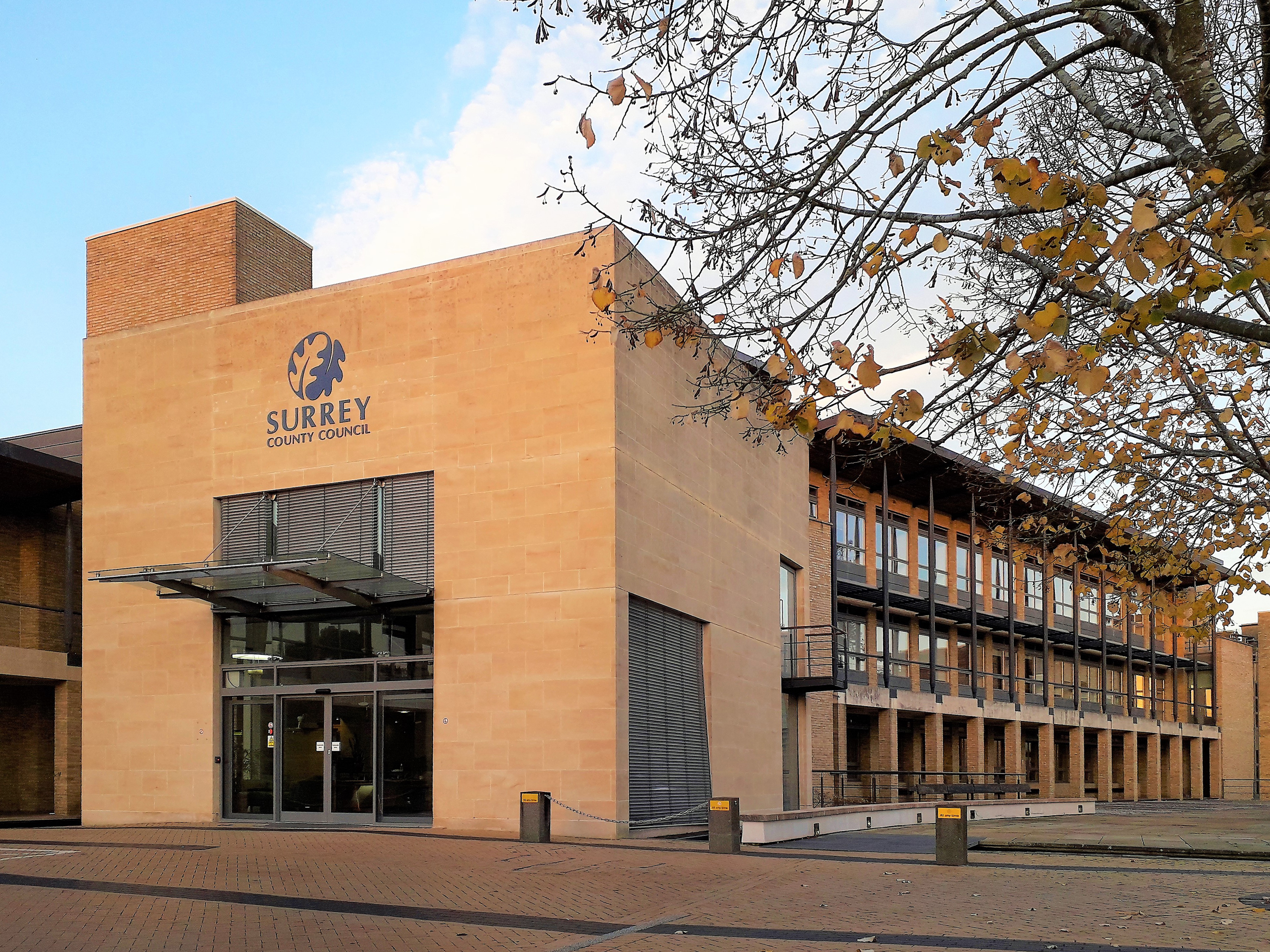
- Woodhatch Place, 11 Cockshot Hill, Reigate, RH2 8EF

Website
- www.surreycc.gov.uk

Surrey County Council is the county council for the non-metropolitan county of Surrey, England. The council is currently run by a Conservative Party minority administration. The council is based in Woodhatch Place, Reigate, and consists of 81 councillors. The council is due to be abolished on 1 April 2027, and will be replaced with East Surrey Council and West Surrey Council.

== History ==
Elected county councils were created in 1889 under the Local Government Act 1888, taking over many administrative functions which had been performed by unelected magistrates at the quarter sessions. In Surrey's case, most such functions in the north-east of the county had already passed to the Metropolitan Board of Works, which had been established in 1856 to administer the urban area of London. Under the 1888 Act, the Metropolitan Board of Works' area became the new County of London. The then borough of Croydon lay outside the County of London, but was considered large enough to run county-level services and so it was made a county borough. Surrey County Council was elected by and provided services to the rest of the county, which area was termed the administrative county.

The first elections to the county council were held in January 1889 and it formally came into being on 1 April 1889. On that day it held its first official meeting at the Sessions House in Newington, which had been the meeting place of the Surrey Quarter Sessions since 1791. Co-incidentally, it was also near Waterloo station, a major hub for the railways serving Surrey. Sessions House was in the area that had transferred from Surrey to the new county of London. The first chairman was Edward Leycester-Penrhyn, who had been chairman of the quarter sessions since 1861.

In 1965, the London Government Act 1963 abolished the existing county of London and replaced it with the larger Greater London, which took over more territory in the north-east of Surrey, including Richmond, Kingston-upon-Thames, Wimbledon and Sutton. At the same time, Staines and Sunbury-on-Thames were transferred to Surrey from Middlesex. In 1974, the Local Government Act 1972 designated Surrey a non-metropolitan county. Prior to the 1974 reforms the lower tier of local government had comprised numerous municipal boroughs, urban districts and rural districts; these were reorganised into eleven non-metropolitan districts.

== Governance ==
Surrey County Council provides county-level services. District-level services are provided by the eleven district councils:

- Elmbridge Borough Council
- Epsom and Ewell Borough Council
- Guildford Borough Council
- Mole Valley District Council
- Reigate and Banstead Borough Council
- Runnymede Borough Council
- Spelthorne Borough Council
- Surrey Heath Borough Council
- Tandridge District Council
- Waverley Borough Council
- Woking Borough Council

Much of the county is also covered by civil parishes, which form a third tier of local government.

=== Political control ===
The county council has been under Conservative control for most of the time since 1973. In the 2021 election, the Conservatives won a majority, but after two by-elections on 21 August 2025 where Reform UK and the Liberal Democrats won a seat each, the county council is under no overall control.

Political control of the council since the 1974 reforms has been as follows:

Party in control	Years
Conservative	1974–1993
No overall control	1993–1997
Conservative	1997–2025
No overall control	2025–present

=== Leadership ===
Since 1997, the council has formally appointed a leader of the council. Since then, the chairman has been a more ceremonial role, presiding at council meetings and representing the council at civic functions. Prior to 1997, the chair of the main policy committee was sometimes informally referred to as the leader in the media. The leaders since 1997 have been:

Councillor	Party	From	To
Nick Skellett	Conservative	22 May 1997	Jun 2009
Andrew Povey	Conservative	23 Jun 2009	11 Oct 2011
David Hodge	Conservative	11 Oct 2011	11 Dec 2018
Tim Oliver	Conservative	11 Dec 2018	

=== Composition ===
Following the 2021 election and subsequent by-elections and changes of allegiance up to May 2025, the composition of the council was (41 needed for a majority):

Party	Councillors
Conservative	40
Liberal Democrats	18
Independent	4
Residents Associations of Epsom and Ewell	4
Residents' association	4
Farnham Residents	3
Green	2
Labour	2
Reform UK	2
Residents for Guildford and Villages	1
Vacant	1
Total	81

The various residents' associations and three of the four independent councillors sit together as a group.

In February 2025, the government postponed the elections that were due to take place in May 2025 for a year, to allow for alternative local government structures for the area to be considered.

== Elections ==
Since the last boundary changes in 2013 the county has been divided into 81 electoral divisions, each of which elects one councillor. Elections are held every four years. The May 2025 elections were cancelled owing to the impending abolition of Surrey County Council, leaving existing councillors in office without elections for an extra two years.

== Premises ==
The council is based at Woodhatch Place in Reigate. The main building there was built in 1999 as the headquarters of Canon (UK) Limited; the complex also includes a large Georgian house. Woodhatch Place was bought by the council in 2020 and converted to become its headquarters including a council chamber and committee rooms. The venue's first full council meeting took place in May 2021.

The council was first headquartered in Newington where the Surrey Quarter Sessions court had been held since 1791. The council moved to a purpose-built headquarters at County Hall, Kingston upon Thames in 1893.

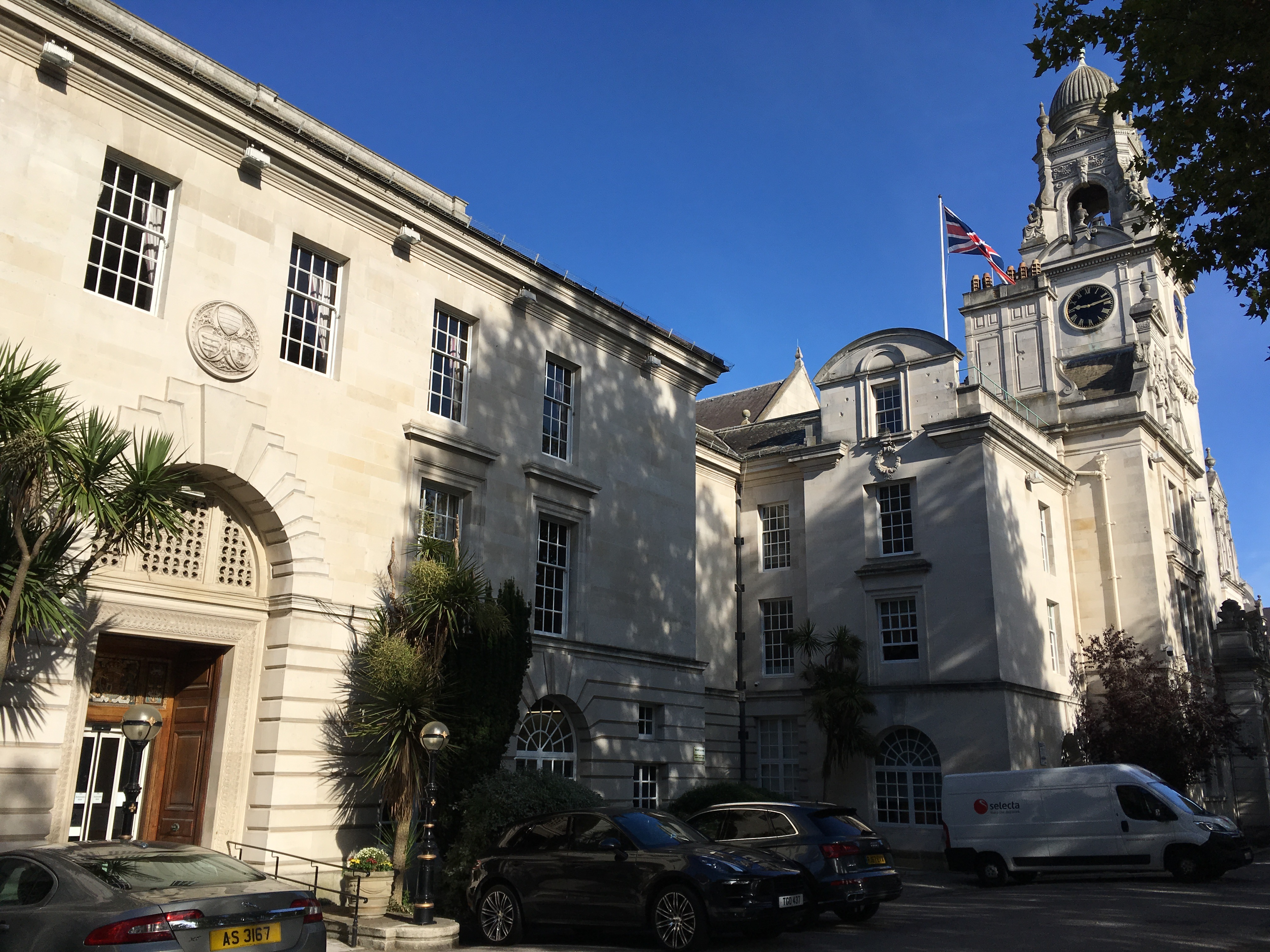
County Hall, Kingston upon Thames: Council's headquarters 1893–2020

Kingston became part of Greater London in 1965. Despite it no longer being in their administrative area, the council continued to be based at County Hall for another 56 years. In November 2019, Surrey County Council announced it would relocate to Woking. The move to Woking was scrapped in 2020; a move to Reigate was announced instead.

== Coat of arms ==
The escutcheon is described as 'Per pale Azure and Sable two Keys in bend wards upwards and outwards bows interlaced Or between in dexter base a Woolpack and in sinister chief a Sprig of Oak fructed Argent', with the badge 'On a Roundel per pale Azure and Sable in chief a Sprig of Oak fructed Argent and in base two Keys [in saltire] wards upwards and outwards Or'. These arms were granted in 1974.
