= 2011 Mole Valley District Council election =

Local election in Surrey, UK

Results of the 2011 Mole Valley District Council election

Elections to Mole Valley District Council were held on 5 May 2011, alongside other local elections across the United Kingdom. 14 seats (one third) of the council were up for election. Following the election the council remained under no overall control.

== Results summary ==
2011 Mole Valley District Council election
Party	Seats	Change
Liberal Democrats	18	Steady
Conservative Party	17	Steady
Others	6	Steady

== See also ==
- Mole Valley District Council elections
