= Newington Butts =

Hamlet in London

Coordinates: 51°29′34″N 0°6′4″W

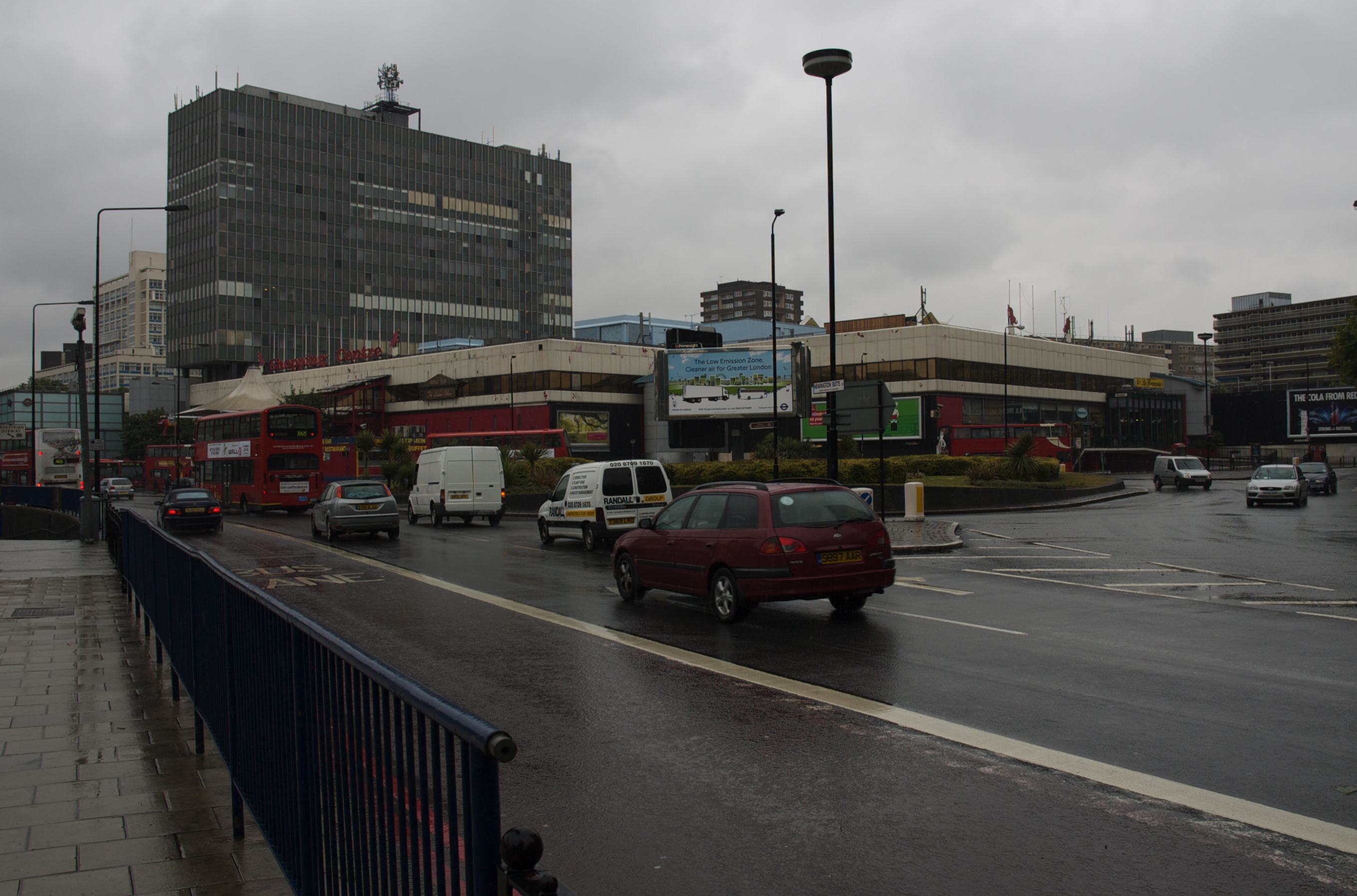
The north end of the "Newington Butts" section of the A3 terminates at a roundabout of the Elephant and Castle junction, where the Elizabethan theatre stood.

Newington Butts is a former hamlet, now an area of the London Borough of Southwark, London, England, that gives its name to a segment of the A3 road running south-west from the Elephant and Castle junction. The road continues as Kennington Park Road leading to Kennington; a fork right is Kennington Lane, leading to Vauxhall Bridge. Michael Faraday was born in Newington Butts in 1791.

It is believed to take its name from an archery butts, or practice field. The area gave its name to an Elizabethan theatre which saw the earliest recorded performances of some Shakespearean plays.

== Toponymy ==
The Middle English word "butt" referred to an abutting strip of land, and is often associated with medieval field systems. The 1955 Survey of London published by London County Council could find no historical reference to archery butts in Newington although the connection is mentioned elsewhere (e.g., in 1792). The name may have alternatively derived from the triangle of land between the roads, as the word "butts" is used elsewhere in Surrey to refer to odd corners or ends of land.

== History ==
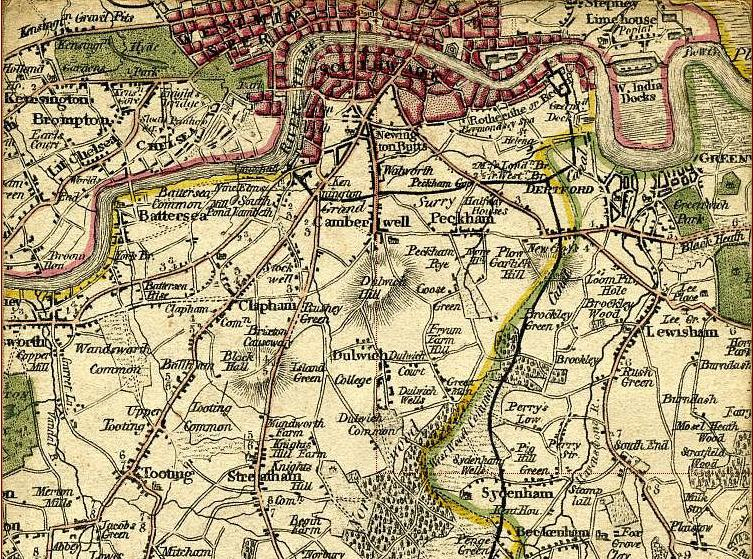
In 1800, Newington Butts was still part of rural Surrey.

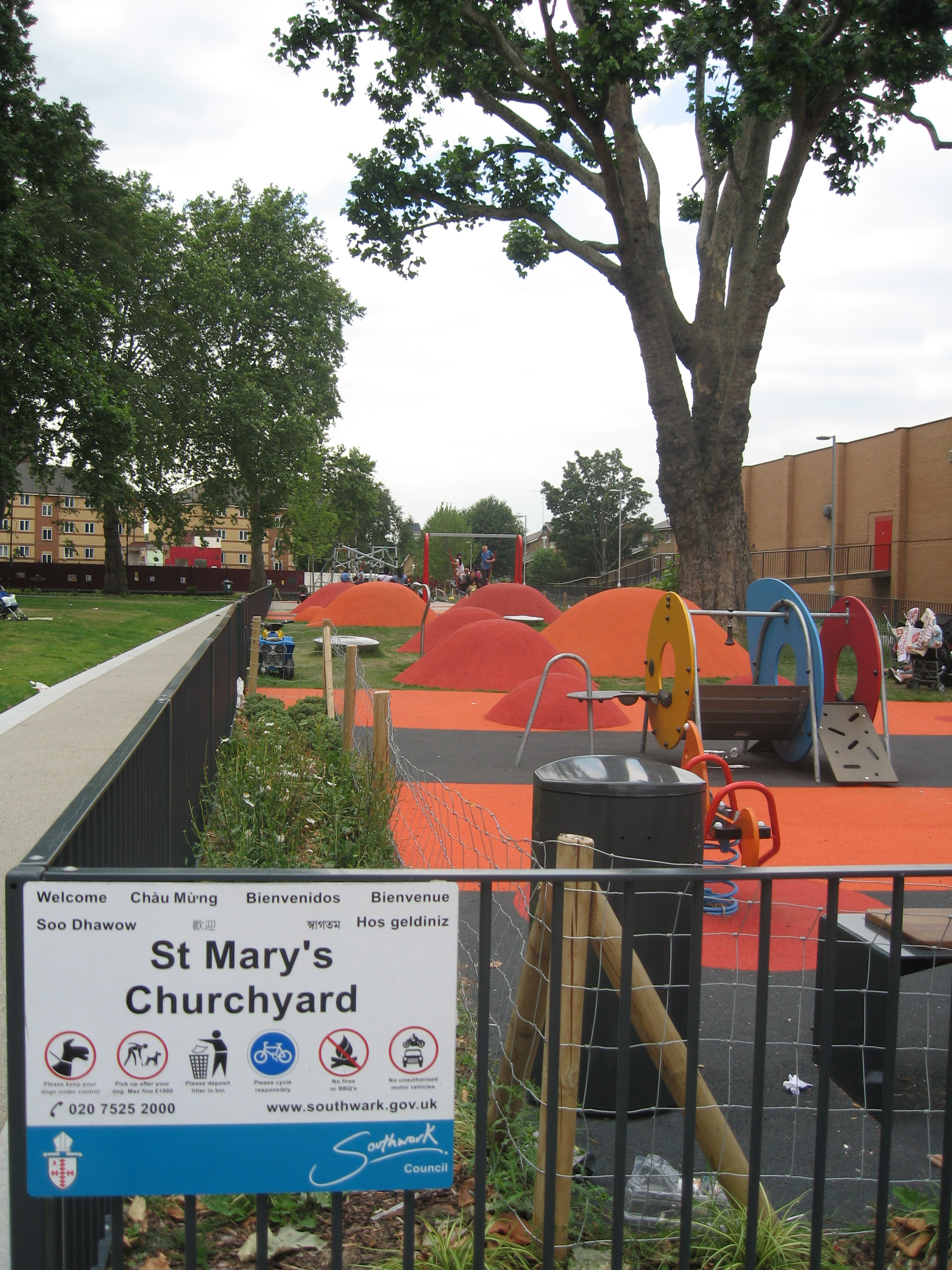
The playground in St Mary's churchyard has mounds that can be thought of as archery butts.

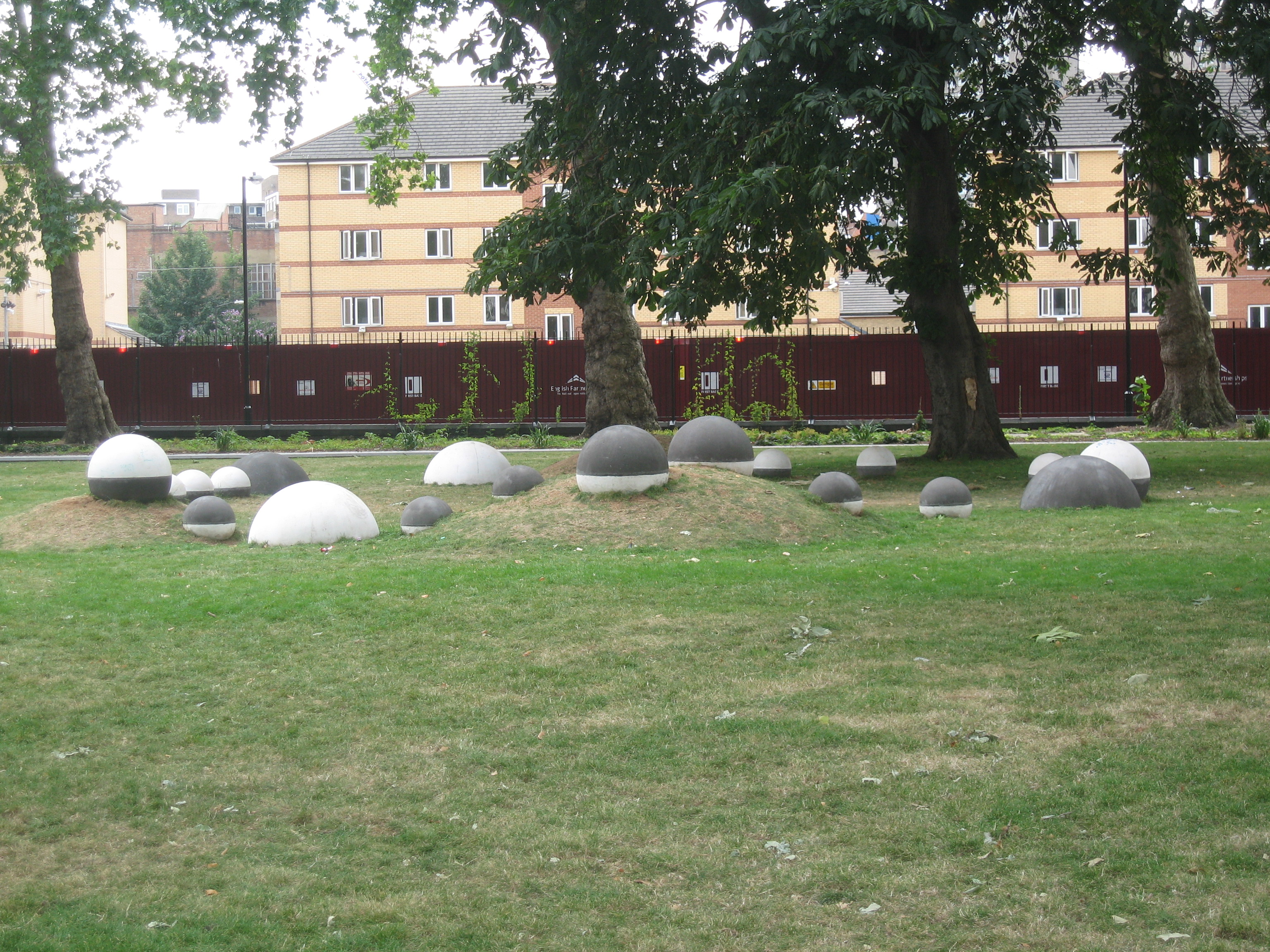
More mounds in the field of St Mary's churchyard.

Newington was a rural village that grew up on the Walworth Road at its junction with the Portsmouth Road, about a mile (1500 m) south of London Bridge. Being outside the jurisdiction of the City of London it became home to activities such as plays that were banned near London during hot weather, for fear of spreading infection.

In the 17th and 18th centuries, the triangle of ground between the roads was known as the Three Falcons and was copyhold of the manor of Walworth. In 1791 the leading scientist Michael Faraday was born at Newington Butts. In 1802, Thomas Hardwick reported that the estate consisted of a number of small tenements in bad condition.

In the spring of 2008, St Mary's Churchyard, the green open space on the northern border of Newington Butts, was given a face lift. The largely grassy area now contains a children's playground. Dotted about within the playground and on the grass elsewhere are concrete mounds with rubber (safety) surfaces which were designed to add interest and topography to the developed area. These mounds might recall archery butts but this has been denied by the Elephant and Castle Regeneration Team.

In Cockney rhyming slang, 'Newington Butts' means 'guts'.

== Theatre ==
The Newington Butts Theatre was one of the earliest Elizabethan theatres, possibly predating even The Theatre of 1576 and the Curtain Theatre, which are usually regarded as the first dedicated playhouses in London.

== See also ==
- English Renaissance theatre
- Newington, London
- Newington Causeway
