= Archery butt =

Target or area used for shooting practice

A butt is an archery shooting field, with mounds of earth used for the targets. The name originally referred to the targets themselves, but over time came to mean the platforms that held the targets as well. For instance Othello, V, ii, 267 mentions "Here is my journey's end, here is my butt". In medieval times, it was compulsory for all yeomen in England to learn archery; see for example An Act concerning shooting in Long Bows, passed in the third year of Henry VIII's reign.

Several English towns have districts called "The Butts", but they may not always take their names from archery. The Middle English word "butt" referred to an abutting strip of land, and is often associated with medieval field systems. An example is Newington Butts in south London where contrary to popular belief, the 1955 Survey of London published by London County Council could find no historical reference to archery butts. It concluded that the name probably derived from the triangle of land between the roads, as the word "butts" is used elsewhere in Surrey to refer to odd corners or ends of land.

== Shooting butt ==
The word is also used today for the earthwork mounds on, or before, which targets are mounted on a rifle range, with the purpose of stopping the flight of bullets beyond the range.

A butt can also be an earthen bank, usually a horseshoe shape and often lined with sandbags, corrugated metal, or drystone walling, from which sportsmen can take cover, hide, and shoot at game birds. Shooting butts are usually positioned in lines or in small groups of two or three, about 80 to 100 meters (87–109 yards) apart.
