= Charles Henry Howell =

Charles Henry Howell FRIBA (c. 1824 – 1905) was the principal architect of lunatic asylums in England during much of the Victorian era. Based in Lancaster Place, London, he was a partner in the architectural firm Howell & Brooks.

Howell designed asylums at Broadgate, near Beverley (1868–1871), Moulsford, near Wallingford (1868–1870 and 1877), Brookwood, near Woking (1862–1867), Cane Hill near Coulsdon (1883) and Middlesbrough (1893–1898).

He was Consultant Architect to the Lunacy Commission and was Surveyor of Public Buildings for the County of Surrey from 1860 to 1893.

Between 1886 and 1897, Howell was the assessor for seven large asylum design competitions, when professional concern was expressed "...[that] Giles, Gough & Trollope or G T Hine always seemed to receive the first two premiums, with the result that any new ideas on asylum design were being stultified."

Other buildings designed by Howell include Christ Church at Shamley Green, Surrey (1864), St Lawrence's Church at Seal Chart, Kent (1867–68), St Leonard's Hill, Windsor, (1875), Ribsden, near Bagshot, Surrey (1876) and Surrey County Hall. He was a Fellow of the Royal Institute of British Architects.

Howell died on 22 June 1905 at Lynwood, Leatherhead, in Surrey.
