= Horsemonger Lane Gaol =

Prison in south London (closed 1878)

Coordinates: 51.4977°N 0.0960°W

Surrey Gaol Act 1791
- Act of Parliament
- Parliament of Great Britain
- Long title: An Act for building a new Common Gaol and Session House, with Accommodations thereto, for the County of Surrey, and for disposing of the present County Gaol and the Ground thereto belonging.
- Citation: 31 Geo. 3. c. 22
- Territorial extent: Great Britain

Dates
- Royal assent: 13 May 1791
- Commencement: 10 August 1790 (Note: Start of session.)
- Repealed: 21 July 2008

Other legislation
- Repealed by: Statute Law (Repeals) Act 2008

Status: Repealed

Text of statute as originally enacted

Mid-19th century print of prison gate

Horsemonger Lane Gaol (also known as the Surrey County Gaol or the New Gaol) was a prison close to present-day Newington Causeway in Southwark, south London. Built at the end of the 18th century, it was in use until 1878.

== History ==
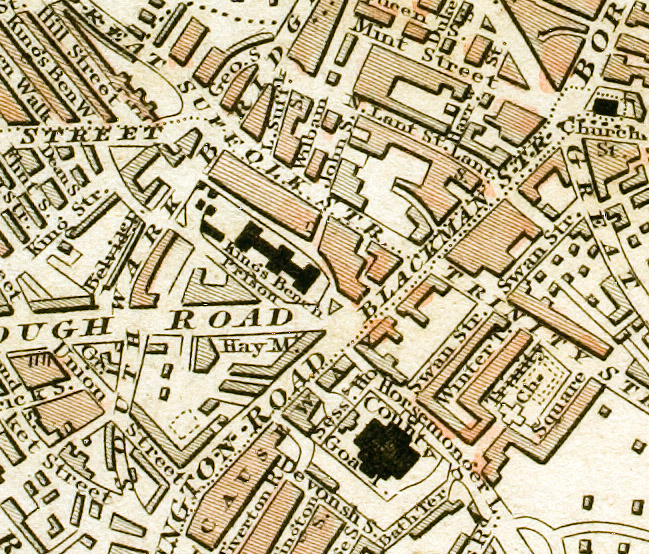
Location of King's Bench Prison and Horsemonger Lane Gaol c.1833

The gaol was built to replace the old county gaol housed at what had been the nearby 'White Lion Inn' on Borough High Street, Southwark (informally called the 'Borough Gaol'). The new building was designed by George Gwilt the Elder, surveyor to the county of Surrey, and completed in 1799. It was adjacent to Sessions House (now Inner London Crown Court), a court building also designed by Gwilt.

Horsemonger Lane remained Surrey’s principal prison and place of execution up to its closure in 1878. It was a common gaol, housing both debtors and criminals, with a capacity of around 300 inmates. In total, 131 men and four women were executed there between 1800 and 1877, the gallows being erected on the flat roof of the prison's gatehouse until abolition of public executions in 1868, and then in a yard behind the walls.

By 1859, the gaol was no longer known as 'Horsemonger Lane' following the road's change of name to Union Road (today: Harper Road), being renamed Surrey County Gaol (although its alternative name, the New Gaol, should not be confused with the New Prison, located north of the River Thames in Clerkenwell).

The gaol was demolished in 1881 and replaced by the Inner London Crown Court, and a public park, Newington Gardens, which opened in 1884.

== Literary connections ==
In 1849, Charles Dickens attended the public hangings outside the gaol of Maria Manning and her husband, who had killed a friend for his money and buried him under the kitchen floor. Dickens wrote to The Times condemning such public spectacles.

Dickens later based the character of Hortense in Bleak House on Maria Manning, while Mrs Chivery's tobacco shop in Little Dorrit is located on Horsemonger Lane. Executions at Horsemonger Lane are also mentioned in Sarah Waters' novel Fingersmith.

== Inmates ==
Inmates included:

- Edward Despard, convicted of high treason (executed at the gaol on 21 February 1803)
- Leigh Hunt, convicted of criticism of the Prince Regent
- William Chester Minor, convicted of murder
- James Pratt and John Smith, awaiting trial at the Old Bailey for sodomy
- Robert Taylor, convicted of blasphemy
- Arthur Tooth, convicted of contempt of court
- Margaret Waters, convicted of murder (executed at the gaol on 11 October 1870)

== See also ==
- Marshalsea
