= 2015 Mole Valley District Council election =

2015 UK local government election

Results of the 2015 Mole Valley District Council election

The 2015 Mole Valley District Council election took place on 7 May 2015 to elect approximately one-third of members to Mole Valley District Council in England coinciding with other local elections held simultaneously with a general election which resulted in increased turnout compared to the election four years before. Some two-member wards such as Holmwoods did not hold a local election in this year, being contested in even-numbered years.

== Results ==
Conservatives gained four seats, giving the group overall control of the Council, from a previous state of no party group exercising overall control.

Mole Valley District Council Election, 2015
Party	Seats	Gains	Losses	Net gain/loss	Seats %	Votes %	Votes	+/−
Conservative	23	4	0	+4	59	47	14223	
Liberal Democrats	10	0	-4	-4	26	27	8248	
Independent	6	0	0	0	15	4	1142	
Labour	0	0	0	0	0	4	1109	
UKIP	0	0	0	0	0	11	3370	
Green	0	0	0	0	0	7	2097	
Vacancies - pending planned by-elections	2	0	0	0	0			

=== Ward by ward ===
Ashtead Village
Party	Candidate	Votes	%	±%
Conservative	Hunt, Christopher Brian	1,857	52.1	
Ashtead Independent	Hawksworth, David Leslie	1,142	32.0	
Labour	Scott, Clive George	248	7.0	
Liberal Democrats	Berry, Matthew	171	4.8	
Green	Cooper, Tony	148	4.2	
Majority		715	20.1	
Turnout		3,566	77	
Conservative hold		Swing		

Beare Green
Party	Candidate	Votes	%	±%
Conservative	Watson, Michelle	448	39.2	
Liberal Democrats	Murdoch, Iain	363	31.7	
UKIP	Bignell, Lesley	259	22.6	
Green	Passmore, Muriel Lily	74	6.5	
Majority		85	7.5	
Turnout		1,144	75	
Conservative gain from Liberal Democrats		Swing		

Bookham North
Party	Candidate	Votes	%	±%
Conservative	Newman, Paul	1,921	53.9	
Liberal Democrats	Hartwell, Amanda Elaine	873	24.5	
UKIP	Moody, Terence	449	12.6	
Green	James, Ann	322	9.0	
Majority		1,048	29.4	
Turnout		3,565	77	
Conservative hold		Swing		

Bookham South
Party	Candidate	Votes	%	±%
Conservative	Chandler, John Frederick	1,793	51.7	
Liberal Democrats	Daly, Elizabeth	1,083	31.2	
UKIP	Heelas, Mike	346	10.0	
Green	Smyth, Genevieve Kathrine	249	7.2	
Majority		710	20.5	
Turnout		3,471	77	
Conservative hold		Swing		

Box Hill & Headley
Party	Candidate	Votes	%	±%
Conservative	Ladell, Malcolm Bailey	531	41.1	
Liberal Democrats	Preedy, David Kennaugh	527	40.8	
UKIP	Cane, Bob	186	14.4	
Green	Sedgwick, Robert Philip	48	3.7	
Majority		4	0.3	
Turnout		1,292	73.5	
Conservative gain from Liberal Democrats		Swing		

Brockham, Betchworth & Buckland
Party	Candidate	Votes	%	±%
Conservative	Muggeridge, John Edwin	1,255	45.5	
Liberal Democrats	Abbot, Roger	1,018	36.9	
UKIP	Bowling, Tim	234	8.5	
Green	Fewster, Jacquetta	146	5.3	
Labour	Buckle, Rosemary Jean	106	3.8	
Majority		237	8.6	
Turnout		2,759	77	
Conservative hold		Swing		

Capel, Leigh & Newdigate
Party	Candidate	Votes	%	±%
Conservative	Osborne-Patterson, Corinna	1,420	56.1	
UKIP	Cox, Geoff	459	18.1	
Liberal Democrats	Sykes, Judith	415	16.4	
Green	Hamlin, Jacqui	235	9.3	
Majority		961	38.0	
Turnout		2,529	74	
Conservative hold		Swing		

Charlwood
Party	Candidate	Votes	%	±%
Conservative	Yarwood, Charles Iain	770	63.6	
UKIP	Haynes, Tony	219	18.1	
Liberal Democrats	Daniels, Dennis	143	11.8	
Green	Barford, Lucy Jane	78	6.4	
Majority		551	45.5	
Turnout		1,210	6	
Conservative hold		Swing		

Dorking South
Party	Candidate	Votes	%	±%
Liberal Democrats	Cooksey, Stephen John	1,644	39.7	
Conservative	Jones, Roger	1,481	35.8	
Green	Crook, Chris	383	9.3	
UKIP	Bignell, Ian	329	8.0	
Labour	Pemberton, Frank	300	7.3	
Majority		163	3.9	
Turnout		4,137	72	
Liberal Democrats hold		Swing		

Leatherhead North
Party	Candidate	Votes	%	±%
Conservative	Mondejar Flores, Santiago	1,064	34.0	
Liberal Democrats	Lewis-Carr, Bridget Mary	915	29.3	
UKIP	Chambers, Simon	571	18.3	
Labour	Ward, Mike	455	14.6	
Green	Elcoate, Victoria	122	3.9	
Majority		149	4.7	
Turnout		3,127	61	
Conservative gain from Liberal Democrats		Swing		

Leith Hill
Party	Candidate	Votes	%	±%
Conservative	Mir, David Karim	523	47.6	
Liberal Democrats	Watson, Hazel Valerie Ann	482	43.9	
Green	Scoffield, David James	48	4.4	
UKIP	Afonso, Apolinario	46	4.6	
Majority		41	3.7	
Turnout		1,099	81	
Conservative hold		Swing		

Mickleham, Westhumble & Pixham
Party	Candidate	Votes	%	±%
Conservative	Irvine, Duncan Campbell	558	46.4	
Liberal Democrats	Lambell, Peter John	474	39.4	
Green	Mcgrath, Susan	90	7.5	
UKIP	Chambers, Sarah	81	6.7	
Majority		84	7.0	
Turnout		1,203	77	
Conservative gain from Liberal Democrats		Swing		

Okewood
Party	Candidate	Votes	%	±%
Conservative	Michael, Vivienne Elizabeth	602	55.4	
UKIP	Jones, Leigh	191	17.6	
Green	Weston, Sarah Jane	154	14.2	
Liberal Democrats	Round, Steven Robert	140	12.9	
Majority		411	37.8	
Turnout		1,087	74	
Conservative hold		Swing		
