= Marie Manning (née de Roux) =

Swiss woman (1821–1849)

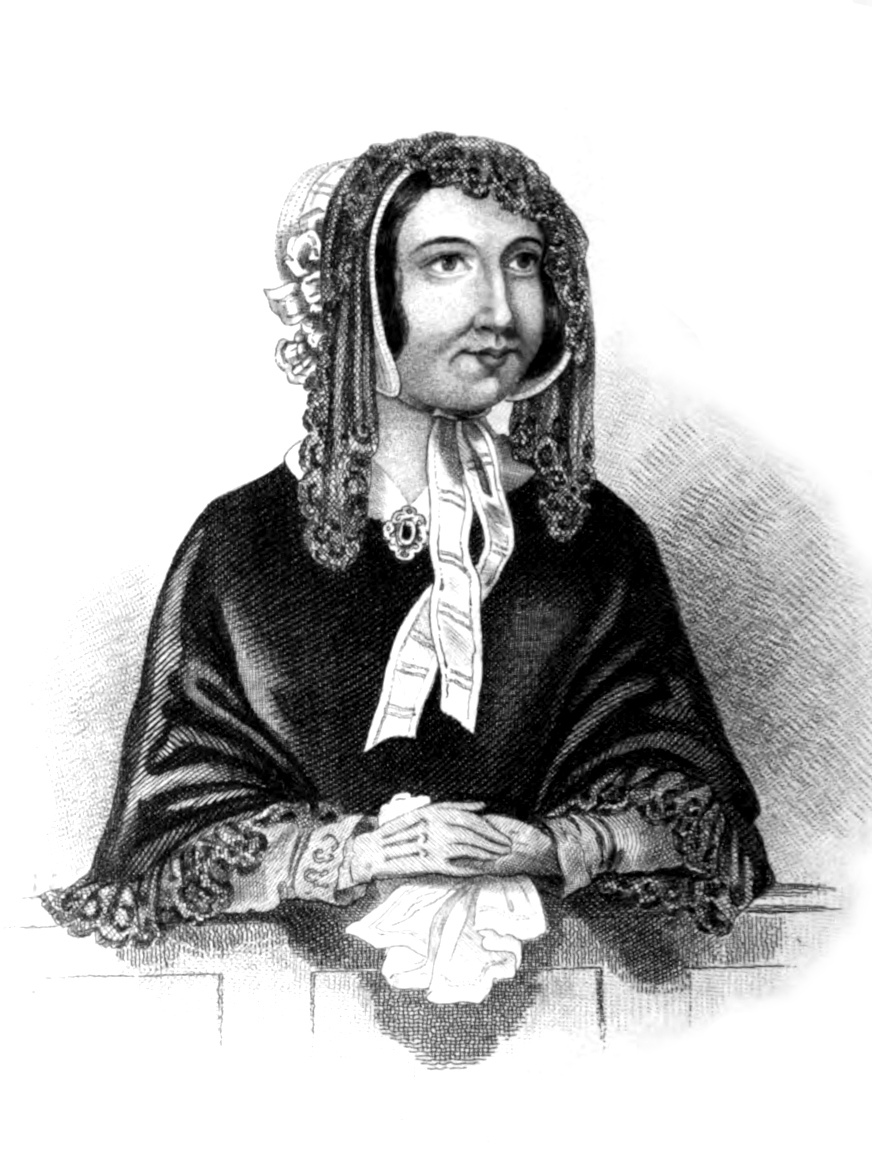
Marie Manning, an image from the contemporary popular press

Marie Manning in The Chronicles of Newgate.

Marie Manning (née de Roux; c. 1821 – 13 November 1849) was a Swiss domestic servant. She was hanged on the roof of London's Horsemonger Lane Gaol on 13 November 1849, after she and her husband Frederick were convicted of the murder of her lover, Patrick O'Connor, in the case that became known as the "Bermondsey Horror". It was the first time that a husband and a wife had been executed together in England since 1700.

The novelist Charles Dickens attended the public execution, and in a letter written to The Times on the same day wrote, "I believe that a sight so inconceivably awful as the wickedness and levity of the immense crowd collected at that execution this morning could be imagined by no man, and could be presented in no heathen land under the sun." Dickens later based one of his characters—Mademoiselle Hortense, Lady Dedlock's maid in Bleak House—on Manning's life.

== Background ==
Marie Manning was born Marie de Roux in the Swiss city of Lausanne, and entered domestic service in England. Initially maid to Lady Palk of Haldon House, Devon, she entered the service of Lady Blantyre at Stafford House, London, in 1846. On 27 May 1847, she married publican Frederick Manning at St James's Church, Piccadilly. His background was chequered; he had worked on the railways but was discharged on suspicion of being involved in several robberies. After the marriage, Marie continued her friendship with Patrick O'Connor, a gauger in the London Docks. He was also a moneylender who charged extraordinary interest, and in so doing had become wealthy.

== Murder ==
On 9 August 1849, O'Connor dined with the Mannings at their home, 3 Miniver Place, Bermondsey. Following a plan, the Mannings murdered their guest by shooting him at close range in the back of the head and buried his body under the flagstones in their kitchen, where it was found a week later on 17 August when a police officer noticed a damp corner stone on the floor, around which the earth was soft. That same day Mrs Manning visited O'Connor's lodgings at Greenwood Street, Mile End Road, stealing the dead man's railway shares and money. She returned the next day to complete the robbery. However, it is apparent that the couple had planned to double-cross each other; Marie fled with most of the stolen goods, her husband fled with the smaller portion. James Coleman, the landlord who resided at 1 Miniver Place, later gave evidence at the trial.

== Trial and execution ==
Marie was tracked down to Edinburgh, where she was caught after trying to exchange some of O'Connor's property (a listing of his possessions had been published). The ten certificates of shares of the Huntingdon, Wisbech, and St Ives Railway were found in her possession. Elsewhere, her husband was caught on the island of Jersey. They were tried at the Old Bailey on 25 and 26 October 1849. The trial was not one of the most fascinating in terms of legal problems, except that it was argued that the jury had to include people of French or Swiss ancestry in fairness to Marie.

O'Connor's stockbroker, Francis Stevens, gave evidence identifying the railway shares: "I know them by the numbers, and by my initials. I delivered them on the 6th of August last. They are amongst the advertised shares, and are numbered 6,460 to 6,469" He also identified ten Amiens and Boulogne shares, numbered 48,666 to 48,674 inclusive, supplied to the deceased.

During the trial, Frederick said that he "never liked [O'Connor] very much". Both he and Marie were found guilty and sentenced to death by hanging, Marie yelling imprecations at the British as a 'perfidious race'. The couple were reconciled shortly before they were executed by William Calcraft at Horsemonger Lane Gaol on 13 November 1849, where they were then buried.

A death mask of Marie was acquired by Dr Thomas Grierson for his Thornhill Institute in Dumfries then in 1965 by Dumfries Museum on the dispersal of Grierson's collections, whilst the couple's grave markers were rescued for the Cuming Museum on the Gaol's demolition in 1881 and remain in the collection of the Cuming's successor the Southwark Heritage Centre.

== Reaction ==
Broadsides on the crime were immensely popular. The year she was tried and executed, street literature salesmen sold 2.5 million broadsides on Manning, surpassing the number of issues sold by The Illustrated London News the previous year by over thirtyfold.

Charles Dickens wrote a letter to The Times decrying the 'wickedness and levity' of the mob during the execution. Herman Melville paid "half a crown" for a spot on a roof overlooking the execution. He wrote in his diary, "The man & wife were hung side by side - still unreconciled to each other - What a change from the time they stood up to be married, together!" Wilkie Collins in his novel The Woman In White (1860) has one of his heroines comment (referring to the fat villain, Count Fosco) that "Mr Murderer and Mrs Murderess Manning were not both unusually stout people?" The novel is set in 1850, a year after the "Bermondsey Horror".
