= Fair Mile Hospital =

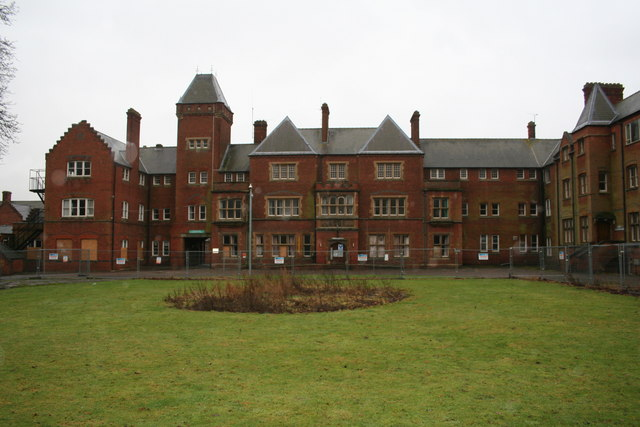
- Front facade

- Shown in Oxfordshire

Geography
- Location: Cholsey, Oxfordshire, England
- Coordinates: 51.56989°N 1.13957°W

Organisation
- Care system: NHS
- Type: Psychiatric

Services
- Beds: over 1,000

History
- Founded: 1870
- Closed: 2003

Links
- Lists: Hospitals in England

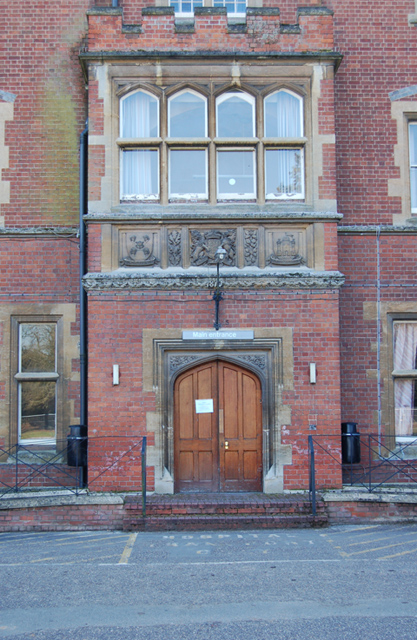
Main entrance of the hospital

Fair Mile Hospital (aka Fairmile Hospital) was a lunatic asylum built in 1870 in the village of Cholsey, 2 miles (3 km) south of Wallingford and north of Moulsford. The asylum was built next to the River Thames between Wallingford and Reading, formerly in Berkshire but, following the boundary changes of 1974, now in Oxfordshire.

== History ==
The UK 1845 County Asylums Act required all counties to provide residential treatment for those with mental illness. A hospital was designed by Charles Henry Howell and followed a corridor-plan lay-out. Construction began in March 1868. The hospital was opened as the County Lunatic Asylum for Berkshire in 1870.

The hospital subsequently became known as the Moulsford Asylum, until 1897 when it became Berkshire Lunatic Asylum. It then became Berkshire Mental Hospital in 1915. The architect George Thomas Hine designed extensions for the building in 1898. The hospital became part of the National Health Service in 1948 under its final name, Fair Mile Hospital. At its peak, the hospital held over a thousand patients. The facility closed in 2003 when use had declined due to modern mental health policy and treatment.

The Victorian buildings remain substantially complete, having been converted to dwellings. The housing development, called 'Fair Mile', opened in 2011. The extant buildings are Grade II listed. New housing occupies other parts of the site, largely confined to areas previously used for ancillary structures.
