= Joseph Gwilt =

English architect and writer (1784–1863)

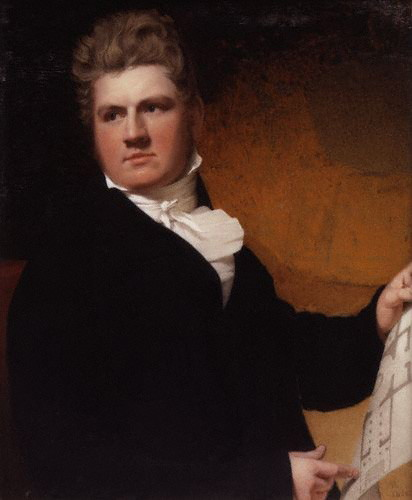
Portrait, watercolour on ivory, of Joseph Gwilt by Andrew Robertson (1777–1845)

Joseph Gwilt (11 January 1784 – 14 September 1863) was an English architect and writer.

He was the son of George Gwilt, architect surveyor to the county of Surrey, and was born at Southwark. George Gwilt the Younger, was his elder brother.

He was educated at St Paul's School, and after a short course of instruction in his father's office was in 1801 admitted a student of the Royal Academy, where in the same year he gained the silver medal for his drawing of the tower and steeple of St Dunstan-in-the-East. In 1811 he published a Treatise on the Equilibrium of Arches, and in 1815 he was elected FSA.

After a visit to Italy in 1816, he published in 1818 Notitia architectonica italiana, or Concise Notices of the Buildings and Architects of Italy. In 1825 he published an edition of Sir William Chambers's Treatise on Civil Architecture; and among his other principal contributions to the literature of his profession are a translation of the Architecture of Vitruvius (1826), a Treatise on the Rudiments of Architecture, Practical and Theoretical (1826), and his valuable Encyclopaedia of Architecture (1842), which was published with additions by Wyatt Papworth in 1867.

In recognition of Gwilt's advocacy of the importance to architects of a knowledge of mathematics, he was in 1833 elected a member of the Royal Astronomical Society. He took a special interest in philology and music, and was the author of Rudiments of the Anglo-Saxon Tongue (1829), and of the article "Music" in the Encyclopaedia metropolitana.

His principal works as a practical architect were Markree Castle near Sligo in Ireland, and St Thomas's Church (1849–1850) at Charlton in Kent (today part of the Royal Borough of Greenwich) and the tower of St Thomas, Clapton Common (1829).

Gwilt was also associated (c. 1813–1830) with a flawed and short-lived attempt to rebuild the mediaeval predecessor of today's St Margaret's Church in Lee. When it became clear that the foundations of the old church were incapable of supporting a new building, a new church was commissioned, from another architect, on land nearby.

A portrait of him is part of the permanent collection at the National Portrait Gallery in London.

In his Encyclopaedia of Architecture, he informs us that standing stones predated all other forms of architecture, that the Druids were the world's first race of civilised people, and that at one time the language and alphabet of the entire ancient world from Ireland to India was the same - that of the Irish Druids.

== Writings ==
- An Encyclopaedia of Architecture, Historical, Theoretical, and Practical, 1859, OCLC 3620766
