= 2024 Mole Valley District Council election =

2024 English local election

- 2 May 2024

14 out of 39 seats to Mole Valley District Council 20 seats needed for a majority

	First party	Second party	Third party
Leader	Stephen Cooksey	Chris Hunt	James Chambers
Party	Liberal Democrats	Ashstead Ind.	Conservative
Last election	30 seats, 48.4%	6 seats, 10.2%	3 seats, 27.5%
Seats before	30 (Note: Including one vacant seat last held by a Liberal Democrat)	6	3
Seats won	12	2	0
Seats after	31	6	2
Seat change	▲1	Steady	▼1
- Map of the results of the 2024 Mole Valley District Council election with Liberal Democrats in yellow and Ashtead Independents in grey.
Leader before election
Stephen Cooksey
Liberal Democrats
Leader after election
Stephen Cooksey
Liberal Democrats

The 2024 Mole Valley District Council election took place on 2 May 2024 to elect members of Mole Valley District Council in Surrey, England. This was on the same day as other local elections. There were 14 of the 39 seats on the council up for election, being the usual third of the council plus a by-election in the Capel, Leigh, Newdigate and Charlwood ward.

== Summary ==
The Liberal Democrats increased their majority on the council, gaining one seat from the Conservatives.

=== Election result ===
2024 Mole Valley District Council election
Party	This election			Full council			This election		
Party	Seats	Net	Seats %	Other	Total	Total %	Votes	Votes %	+/−
Liberal Democrats	12	+1	85.7	19	31	79.5	12,718	47.6	-0.8
Ashtead Ind.	2	-	14.3	4	6	15.4	2,535	9.5	-0.7
Conservative	0	-1	0.0	2	2	5.1	6,685	25.0	-2.5
Green	0	-	0.0	0	0	0.0	2,722	10.2	-0.1
Labour	0	-	0.0	0	0	0.0	1,874	7.0	+5.0
Reform	0	-	0.0	0	0	0.0	186	0.7	N/A

== Ward results ==
The Statement of Persons Nominated, which details the candidates standing in each ward, was released by Mole Valley District Council following the close of nominations on 5 April 2024. Sitting councillors standing for re-election are marked with an asterisk (*).

=== Ashtead Lanes & Common ===
Ashtead Lanes & Common
Party	Candidate	Votes	%	±%
Ashstead Ind.	Andy Smith	1,437	58.9	-2.9
Liberal Democrats	Jolanta Waugh	450	18.4	−1.3
Conservative	Lynn Walker	259	10.6	−0.8
Labour	Susan Gilchrist	164	6.7	−3.0
Green	Emily Stewart	130	5.3	N/A
Majority		987	40.6	N/A
Turnout		2440	41.1	−0.8
Registered electors		5,937		
Residents hold		Swing		

=== Ashstead Park ===
Ashstead Park
Party	Candidate	Votes	%	±%
Ashstead Ind.	Gerry Sevenoaks*	1,098	53.3	+11.0
Liberal Democrats	Philippa Shimmin	375	18.2	+7.5
Conservative	Howard Jones	368	17.9	+6.2
Labour	Steve Eagle	134	6.5	+0.6
Green	Sally Stewart	84	4.1	−7.4
Majority		723	35.1	N/A
Turnout		2,059	38.2	−3.8
Registered electors		5,390		
Residents hold		Swing		

=== Bookham East & Eastwick Park ===
Bookham East & Eastwick Park
Party	Candidate	Votes	%	±%
Liberal Democrats	Andrew Matthews*	1,426	62.6	+6.1
Conservative	Louise Calland	696	30.5	−7.8
Green	Penny Green	101	4.4	−2.4
Labour	William Mansfield	56	2.5	−0.6
Majority		730	32.0	N/A
Turnout		2,279	47.0	−6.3
Registered electors		4,849		
Liberal Democrats hold		Swing		

=== Bookham West ===
Bookham West
Party	Candidate	Votes	%	±%
Liberal Democrats	Christine Miller*	1,234	60.6	+3.1
Conservative	Beccy Gunn	564	27.7	−5.5
Green	Fiona Case	138	6.8	−5.5
Labour	Timothy Kent	100	4.9	N/A
Majority		670	32.9	N/A
Turnout		2,036	41.2	−3.2
Registered electors		4,942		
Liberal Democrats hold		Swing		

=== Brockham, Betchworth, Buckland, Box Hill & Headley ===
Brockham, Betchworth, Buckland, Box Hill & Headley
Party	Candidate	Votes	%	±%
Liberal Democrats	Paula Keay*	1,052	50.2	+2.6
Conservative	Radia Kesseiri	617	29.4	+1.2
Green	Peter Butterworth	245	11.7	−0.8
Labour	Noel Humphrey	182	8.7	+1.4
Majority		435	20.8	N/A
Turnout		2,096	41.0	−3.4
Registered electors		5,112		
Liberal Democrats hold		Swing		

=== Capel, Leigh, Newdigate & Charlwood ===
Capel, Leigh, Newdigate & Charlwood (2 seats due to by-election)
Party	Candidate	Votes	%	±%
Liberal Democrats	Kirstie Havard	857	46.4	+3.8
Liberal Democrats	Dineke van den Bogerd	763	41.3	+7.0
Conservative	David McCorquodale	658	35.6	+2.4
Conservative	Mark Saunders	657	35.6	+6.1
Green	Lisa Scott	400	21.6	−7.1
Green	Gerard Bolton	218	11.8	−9.0
Labour	Mick Hay	86	4.7	N/A
Labour	Leo Nasskau	57	3.1	+0.1
Majority				
Turnout			38.6	
Registered electors				
Liberal Democrats hold		Swing		
Liberal Democrats hold		Swing		

By-election to replace Liberal Democrat councillor Lesley Bushnell.

=== Dorking North ===
Dorking North
Party	Candidate	Votes	%	±%
Liberal Democrats	Elsie Rosam*	1,186	49.6	+4.7
Green	Chris Crook	608	25.4	−6.9
Conservative	Lucy Botting	300	12.5	−0.6
Labour	Clare Mansfield	297	12.4	−1.7
Majority		578	24.2	N/A
Turnout		2,391	43.5	−0.6
Registered electors		5,497		
Liberal Democrats hold		Swing		

=== Dorking South ===
Dorking South
Party	Candidate	Votes	%	±%
Liberal Democrats	Nick Wright*	1,236	58.8	+4.0
Conservative	Michael Foulston	343	16.3	−2.8
Green	Molly Crook	301	14.3	−6.3
Labour	Kev Stroud	222	10.6	N/A
Majority		893	42.5	N/A
Turnout		2,102	37.5	−0.7
Registered electors		5,605		
Liberal Democrats hold		Swing		

=== Fetcham ===
Fetcham
Party	Candidate	Votes	%	±%
Liberal Democrats	Caroline Joseph*	1,276	58.3	+4.3
Conservative	Paul Austin	686	31.3	+0.2
Green	Joanna Sherring	139	6.3	−2.7
Labour	Beatriz Heath	88	4.0	−2.2
Majority		590	27.0	N/A
Turnout		2,189	40.5	−3.4
Registered electors		5,405		
Liberal Democrats hold		Swing		

=== Holmwoods & Beare Green ===
Holmwoods & Beare Green
Party	Candidate	Votes	%	±%
Liberal Democrats	Clayton Wellman*	832	45.4	+2.1
Conservative	Michelle Watson	550	30.0	−3.6
Reform	Simon Keats	186	10.1	N/A
Green	John Roche	152	8.3	−4.1
Labour	Christine Foster	113	6.2	−2.5
Majority		282	15.4	N/A
Turnout		1,833	36.8	+−0.0
Registered electors		4,981		
Liberal Democrats hold		Swing		

=== Leatherhead North ===
Leatherhead North
Party	Candidate	Votes	%	±%
Liberal Democrats	Benjamin Wear*	671	51.9	+0.6
Conservative	Alan Gibbs	327	25.3	−1.8
Labour	Chloe Roper	195	15.1	N/A
Green	Gergory Smith	100	7.7	−14.2
Majority		344	26.6	N/A
Turnout		1,293	29.1	+1.9
Registered electors		4,443		
Liberal Democrats hold		Swing		

=== Leatherhead South ===
Leatherhead South
Party	Candidate	Votes	%	±%
Liberal Democrats	Gareth Parsons	970	49.0	+8.8
Conservative	Tim Hall	714	36.1	−6.7
Labour	Ann Clark	164	8.3	−2.4
Green	Melissa Awcock	131	6.6	−8.9
Majority		256	12.9	N/A
Turnout		1,979	44.0	+−0.0
Registered electors		4,498		
Liberal Democrats gain from Conservative		Swing		

=== Mickleham, Westcott & Okewood ===
Mickleham, Westcott & Okewood
Party	Candidate	Votes	%	±%
Liberal Democrats	Leah Mursaleen-Plank*	1,153	57.0	+6.5
Conservative	David Mir	603	29.8	−5.3
Green	James Poke	193	9.5	−7.5
Labour	James Stringer	73	3.6	N/A
Majority		550	27.2	N/A
Turnout		2,022	39.3	−3.3
Registered electors		5,145		
Liberal Democrats hold		Swing		

== Changes 2024-2026 ==
=== By-elections ===
==== Holmwoods & Beare Green ====
Holmwoods & Beare Green by-election: 20 March 2025
Party	Candidate	Votes	%	±%
Liberal Democrats	Bradley Nelson	748	46.5	+1.1
Conservative	Michelle Watson	437	27.2	–2.8
Reform	Michael Carter	348	21.6	+11.5
Green	Lisa Scott	76	4.7	–3.6
Majority		311	19.3	+3.9
Turnout		1,610	32.0	–4.2
Registered electors		5,034		
Liberal Democrats hold		Swing	▲2.0	

==== Bookham East & Eastwick Park ====
Bookham East & Eastwick Park by-election: 10 July 2025
Party	Candidate	Votes	%	±%
Liberal Democrats	Lawrence Penney	1,056	56.0	–6.6
Reform	Richard Granville	387	20.5	N/A
Conservative	Louise Calland	386	20.5	–10.0
Green	Gerard Bolton	56	3.0	–1.4
Majority		669	36.0	+3.9
Turnout		1,887	38.3	–8.1
Registered electors		4,929		
Liberal Democrats hold				
