= George Gwilt the younger =

English architect

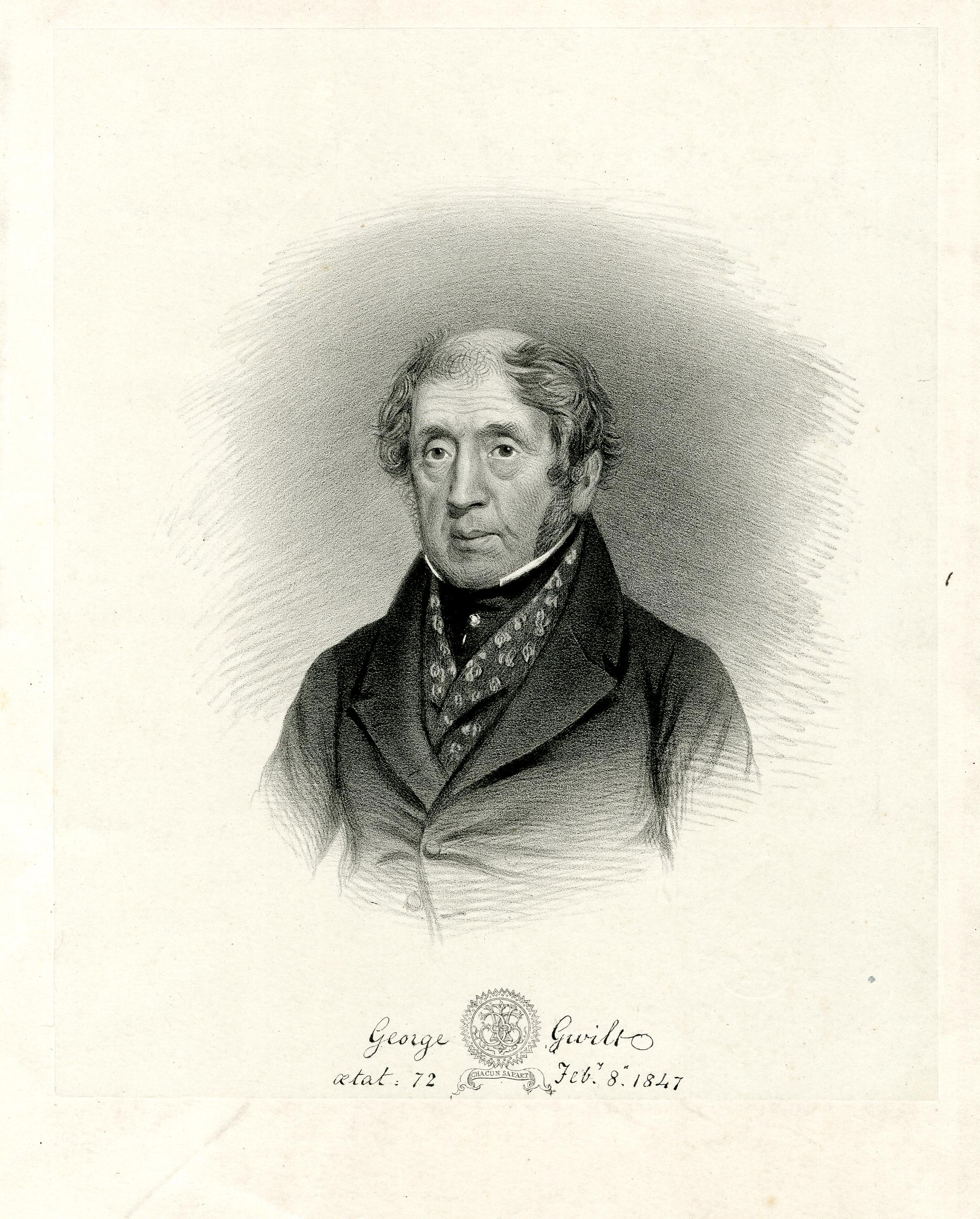
George Gwilt the younger

George Gwilt, the younger (1775–1856) was an English architect and writer on architecture. best known for his restoration of the east end of the church of St. Saviour, Southwark, (now Southwark Cathedral).

== Biography ==
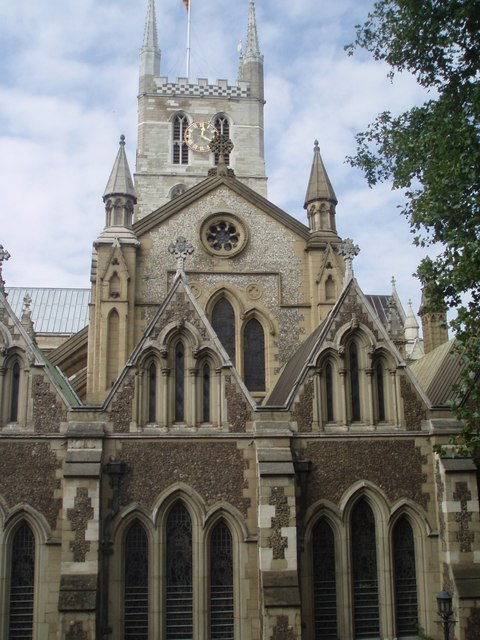
The east end of Southwark Cathedral, restored by George Gwilt the younger

Gwilt was born in Southwark on 8 May 1775, the eldest son of George Gwilt the elder. He was articled to his father, and succeeded him in business as an architect. He was from the first very fully employed, one of his earliest important commissions being the large warehouses erected about 1801 for the West India Dock Company.

Gwilt was drawn towards the study rather than the active practice of architecture, and from early on he devoted himself to archæological pursuits. He wrote many papers for the Archæologia and the Vetusta Monumenta of the Society of Antiquaries, of which he was elected a fellow on 14 December 1815. In 1820 he superintended the rebuilding of the tower and spire of Wren's church of St. Mary-le-Bow in the City of London, the upper part of which had to be taken down due to the decay of the iron cramps used to hold the stones together. The foundations of the building, which incorporate Norman and even supposed Roman remains, were repaired at the same time.

He was particularly interested in the antiquities of Southwark, and contributed an article on the remains of Winchester Palace to the Gentleman's Magazine in 1815. He also contributed to Britton and Pugin's Illustrations of the Public Buildings of London.

Gwilt's most important archaeological work was the restoration of the church of St. Saviour, Southwark, (now Southwark Cathedral). The tower and choir were restored 1822–5 at a cost of £35,000. In his enthusiasm for returning the church to its thirteenth-century appearance he removed the early sixteenth-century windows at the east end of the choir and, lacking firm evidence as to the original design, substituted an elevation of his own invention, with three lancet windows, and a circular one in the gable above. When the lady chapel was restored at a cost of £3,000, raised by public subscription, its threatened demolition having been averted, Gwilt gave his services as an architect free.

Gwilt died on 26 June 1856 at the age of eighty-one, and was buried, by authority of the secretary of state, in a vault of the choir of St. Saviour's, Southwark.

== Family ==
George Gwilt married Mary Ann Applegath on 1 September 1800 at All Saints Church, Isleworth [TW7 6BE]. Mary Ann's stepfather was John Busch [1730-1795] the landscape architect.

George and Mary Ann had three sons. The two eldest, George and Charles Edwin, were promising architects, but both died young. The latter contributed a paper on some antiquities of Southwark to the Archæologia (xxv. 604).

They also had five daughters. The third daughter Hannah [1807-1893] took a keen interest in astronomy and is the donor of the Jackson-Gwilt Medal of the Royal Astronomical Society. The second daughter Sarah's younger son Edward Haldane Cotsworth [1832-1892] was an early Australian photographer. The youngest daughter, Aderline's son was the painter Martin Gwilt Jolley [1859-1916].

== Sources ==
Worley, George (1905). Bell's Cathedrals: Southwark Cathedral. London: George Bell & Sons.

Attribution

- This article incorporates text from a publication now in the public domain: Burnet, George Wardlaw (1890). "Gwilt, George (1775-1856)". In Stephen, Leslie; Lee, Sidney (eds.). Dictionary of National Biography. Vol. 23. London: Smith, Elder & Co. p. 397. This source notes:
  - Builder, vol. xiv. (1856);
  - Gent. Mag. (1833), pt. i. p. 254, (1856), ii. 250.
