= Gwilt Jolley =

Martin Gwilt Jolley (1859–1916) was an English painter.

He was born in Croydon in 1859, and exhibited at the Royal Academy from 1887 to 1916. His work included landscapes and figure paintings, with views from Cornwall and continental Europe.

His picture, Steam Train in Carbis Bay, is one of a number of remarkable works in the exhibition at Penlee House, Penzance, Cornwall: Dawn of a Colony: Lyrical Light (St. Ives 1889-1914), running 14 June to 13 September 2008.
