= Newington, London =

District of Central London, England

Coordinates: 51.4988°N 0.0901°W

Newington
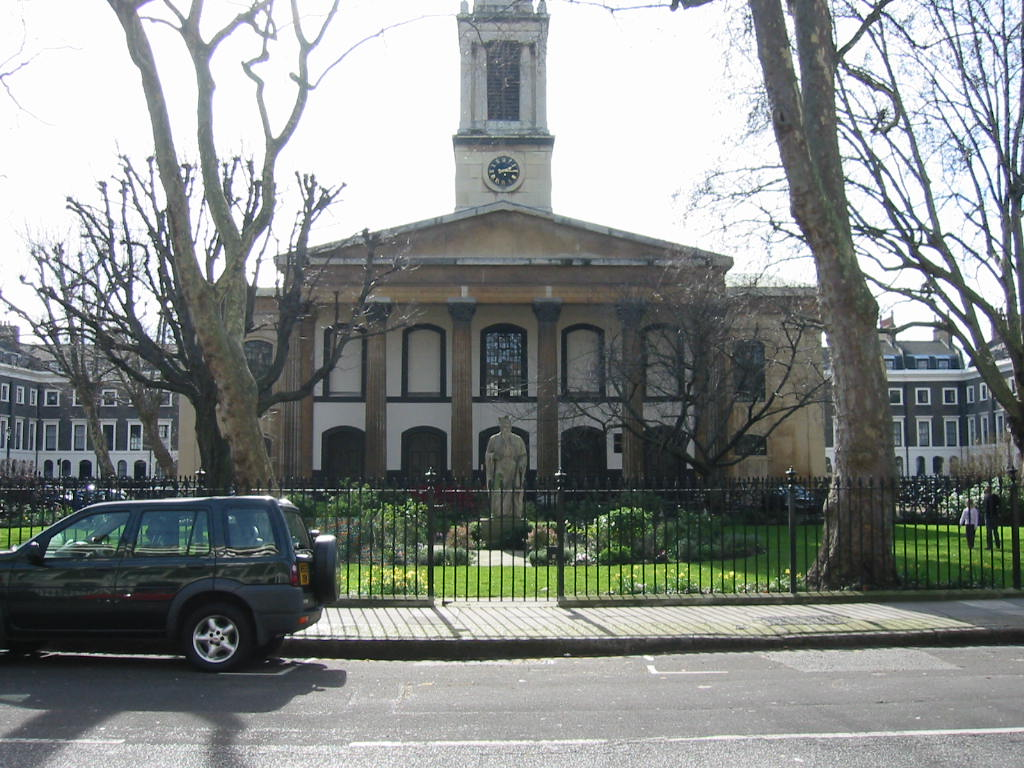
- Trinity Church Square forms part of a conservation area

- Location within Greater London
- Population: 14,136 (2011 Census. Ward)
- OS grid reference: TQ325795
- London borough: Southwark
- Ceremonial county: Greater London
- Region: London
- Country: England
- Sovereign state: United Kingdom
- Post town: LONDON
- Postcode district: SE1, SE17
- Dialling code: 020
- Police: Metropolitan
- Fire: London
- Ambulance: London
- UK Parliament: Vauxhall and Camberwell Green
- London Assembly: Lambeth and Southwark

Newington is a district of South London, just south of the River Thames, and part of the London Borough of Southwark. It was an ancient parish and the site of the early administration of the county of Surrey. It was the location of the County of London Sessions House from 1917, in a building now occupied by the Inner London Crown Court.

== History ==
=== Toponymy ===
The name means "new farmstead" to refer to a newer part of the manor of Walworth. It lay on the old Roman road from London to West Sussex, specifically directly to Chichester (also linking to London/Westminster much of Surrey including Kingston and Guildford) (this was one of the Stane Streets). The proximity to London meant stalls, stables and stores were by the late medieval period numerous. The first mention of Newington (or Neweton) occurs in the Testa de Nevill (a survey of feudal tenure officially known as the Book of Fees compiled 1198–1242) during the reign of Henry III, wherein it is stated that the queen's goldsmith holds of the king one acre of land in Neweton, by the service of rendering a gallon of honey. In 1313 it is mentioned again in the Archbishop of Canterbury's Register as Newington juxta London. The name survives now in the street names Newington Causeway and Newington Butts and in the open space Newington Gardens, on the site of Horsemonger Lane Gaol (1791–1878).

Newington as a ward currently is a name for one of the equal-electorate drawn divisions of councillors of the London Borough of Southwark, covering from Walworth Road up to the borough's western limit with South Lambeth, Lambeth.

=== Urban development ===
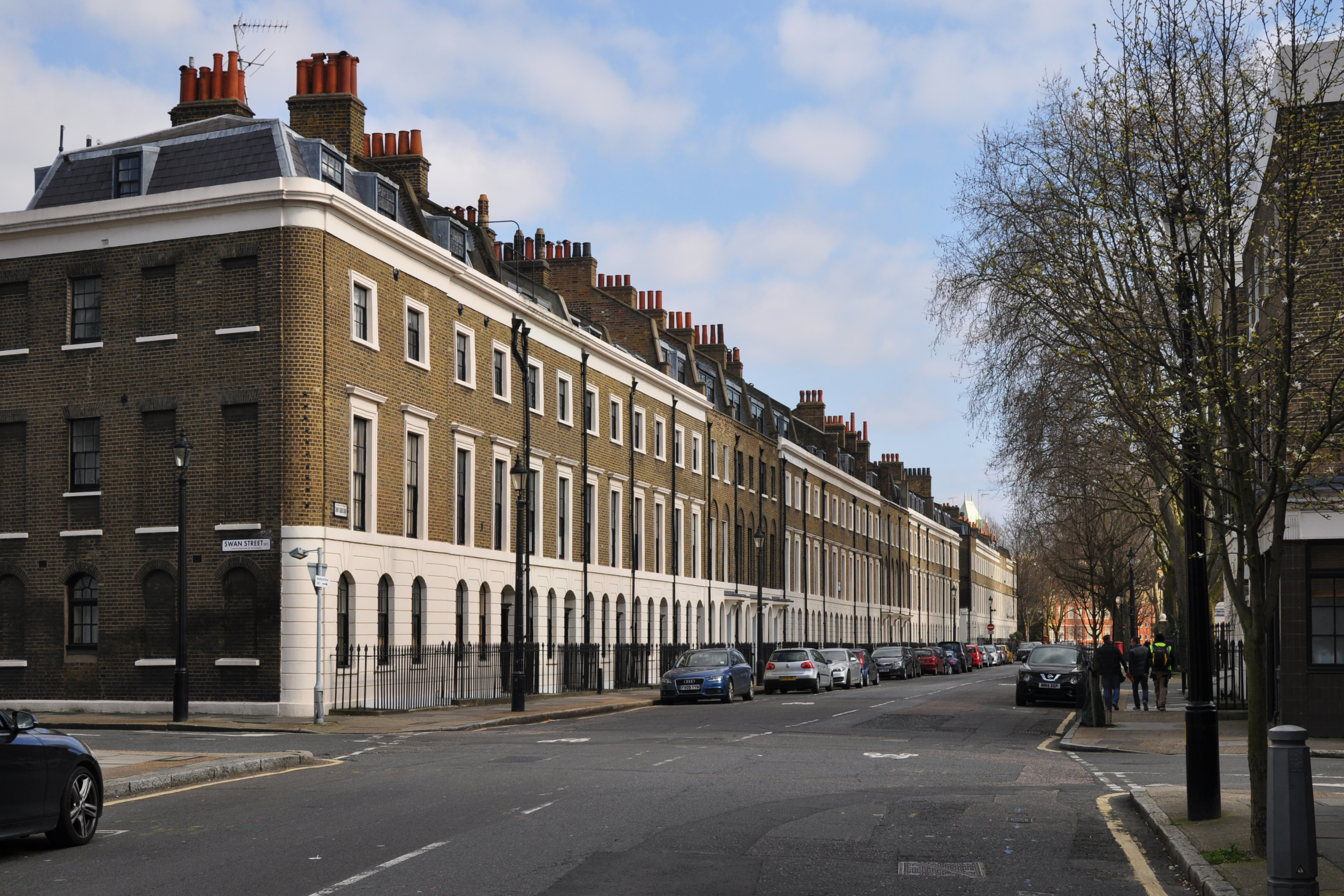
Regency terraces of Trinity Street

The area remained as a farming village with a low level of population until the second half of the 18th century. There was a little industry, for example, the manufacture of clay pipes for tobacco smoking. In William Shakespeare's time, there was a theatre called Newington Butts and later there were further theatres. Newington gained in importance with the creation of the Westminster Bridge in 1750 and the associated improvements of London Bridge which required a series of new roads across St George's Fields to interconnect the routes from them and allow traffic from the Georgian West End to travel south and to Southwark without transitting through the city. These routes were Westminster Bridge Road and Borough Road for the West End and Southwark; for the route to the south London Road and St George's Road supplemented and by-passed the Borough High Street and Newington Causeway. All of these roads converged at a junction where there was a blacksmith's forge and inn called Elephant and Castle which then became a name to signify the area. Traffic heading to the south-east from the West End was connected to the older route from the City of London and Southwark to Kent as New Kent Road from Newington to a junction with the older route at the Bricklayers Arms. New roads brought development opportunities. The local landowner, Henry Penton (Member of Parliament (MP) for Winchester), started to sell some of his farmland. The 19th century brought more dense speculative house building, and some philanthropic provision too. The Trinity House Newington Estate, laid out on property the institution was left in the seventeenth century, became a high class residential district which is still largely in existence. It was built around an 1820s classical church by Francis Octavius Bedford.

Further urban stimulus was given by the arrival of mainline railway routes from the city to the south, the London, Chatham and Dover Railway built a station at Elephant and Castle in 1863. In 1890 the City and South London Railway (now the Northern line City Branch of London Underground) was projected through the area with stations at what was termed 'Kennington' (but in fact within Newington) and also at Elephant. In 1906 the new Bakerloo line terminated at the Elephant also.

=== Local governance ===
The parish of Newington St Mary was part of the Brixton Hundred of Surrey and this contained all of the manor of Walworth. Before the creation of elected County Councils, in 1889, the county Magistrates were responsible for ensuring compliance with local bye-laws and ordinances, so that with the creation of the new Surrey County Sessions House at Newington Causeway in 1792 Newington was the County Town, until Kingston on Thames was designated as such in 1893. In 1855 it came within the area of responsibility of the Metropolitan Board of Works and the parish vestry was incorporated as a local authority. In 1889 it became part of the County of London. There was a reorganisation of local government in 1900 and the parish became part of the Metropolitan Borough of Southwark and the vestry was abolished. On 1 April 1930 the civil parish was abolished to form Southwick. The parish was of 633 acres (2.56 km^{2}) and the population peaked in 1901 at 121,863, at the 1921 census (the last before the abolition of the parish), Newington had a population of 114,987.

Newington is a ward within the London Borough of Southwark and the Parliamentary seat of Bermondsey and Old Southwark. It is represented by Councillors Eleanor Kerslake and Alice Macdonald of the Labour Party and James Coldwell, Independent.

== Ecclesiastical parish ==
The ancient parish, dedicated to St Mary, was in the Diocese of Winchester until 1877, then the Diocese of Rochester until 1905, since when it is in the Diocese of Southwark. From 1826, as the population of Newington increased, ten new parishes were formed:

- Holy Trinity, Newington in 1826
- St Peter, Walworth in 1826
- St Paul, Newington in 1857
- St John, Walworth in 1860
- All Saints, Newington in 1866
- St Matthew, Newington in 1868
- St Mark, Walworth in 1870
- St Stephen, Walworth Common in 1871
- All Souls, Grosvenor Park in 1871
- St Andrew, Newington in 1877

Small parts of the above augmented other parishes, later:

- St Agnes, Kennington Park in 1874 with parts of St Mary, Lambeth
- St Mark, Camberwell in 1880 with parts of St Giles, Camberwell

== Politics ==
A map showing the Newington wards of Southwark Metropolitan Borough as they appeared in 1916.

Under the Metropolis Management Act 1855 any parish that exceeded 2,000 ratepayers was to be divided into wards; as such the incorporated vestry of St Mary Newington was divided into four wards (electing vestrymen): No. 1 or St Mary's (18), No. 2 or Trinity (18), No. 3 or St Paul's (15) and No. 4 or St Peter's (21).

In 1894 as its population had increased the incorporated vestry was re-divided into five wards (electing vestrymen): St Mary's (15), St Paul's (12), St Peter's (15), St John's (18) and Trinity (12).

Newington 2022 Results (3)
Party	Candidate	Votes	%	±%
Labour	Alice Macdonald*	2,051		
Labour	Natasha Ennin	2,011		
Labour	John Batteson	1,955		−
Green	Suzy Gillett	494		
Green	Clare Wood	453		
Liberal Democrats	James Gurling	408		
Green	Lina Usma	371		
Liberal Democrats	Abdul Gbla	368		
Liberal Democrats	Joshua Sharman	350		
Conservative	Charles Dempsey	311		
Conservative	Suzie Bridgen-Didier	297		
Conservative	Erda Prenci	233		
Turnout		3,236	31.62	+0.03
Labour hold		Swing		
Labour hold		Swing		
Labour hold		Swing		

In May 2019, Coldwell resigned from Labour in opposition to the then leader Jeremy Corbyn and the parties stance on Brexit. He now sits as an Independent.

Newington 2018 Results (3)
Party	Candidate	Votes	%	±%
Labour	Eleanor Kerslake*	2,137		
Labour	James Coldwell*	2,082		
Labour	Alice MacDonald	1,997		
Green	Betiel Mehari	837		
Liberal Democrats	James Doran	457		
Green	Kate Belcheva	429		
Liberal Democrats	Harriet Shone	420		
Liberal Democrats	Alistair Bigos	406		
Green	David Powell	354		
Conservative	Sue Badman	275		
Conservative	Will Amor	257		
Conservative	Joseph Lyons	243		
Majority				
Turnout		3,254	31.59	
Labour win (new seat)				
Labour win (new seat)				
Labour win (new seat)				

== People ==
- Charles Babbage the promoter of the first computing machine was born in Walworth Road
- Michael Faraday was born in Newington Butts, in 1791
- William Jowett, a 19th-century missionary and author, was born in Newington in 1787,
- Samuel Palmer, artist, born in Surrey Square in 1805
- Tom Smith (1823–1869) the creator of the Christmas cracker
- William Swainson, ornithologist and natural history artist (1789–1855)
- William Walker, was born in Newington, in 1869.

== Geography ==
Nearest places:

- Walworth
- Kennington
- Bermondsey
- Vauxhall

Nearest tube stations:

- Kennington
- Borough
- Elephant & Castle
- Lambeth North
- London Bridge

Nearest railway stations:

- London Bridge
- Elephant & Castle
- Waterloo
- Blackfriars
