= George Gwilt =

English architect

George Gwilt (1746–1807), also sometimes known as George Gwilt the Elder, was an English architect, particularly associated with buildings in and around London.

His sons George and Joseph were also architects, training in his office in Southwark; John Shaw was also a pupil of 'George Gwilt & Sons'.

Gwilt was architect surveyor for the county of Surrey. His buildings included:

- Cobham Bridge (c. 1782)
- Leatherhead Bridge (1782–83) rebuilding and enlarging the original late Medieval bridge
- The Camden Chapel, Camberwell (1796–1798)
- Horsemonger Lane Gaol and Sessions House, Newington Causeway, London (1791–1799 - demolished c.1880, with Sessions House being rebuilt)
- The warehouses at West India Docks (1800–1804, a joint project with his son, George)
