= Inner London Crown Court =

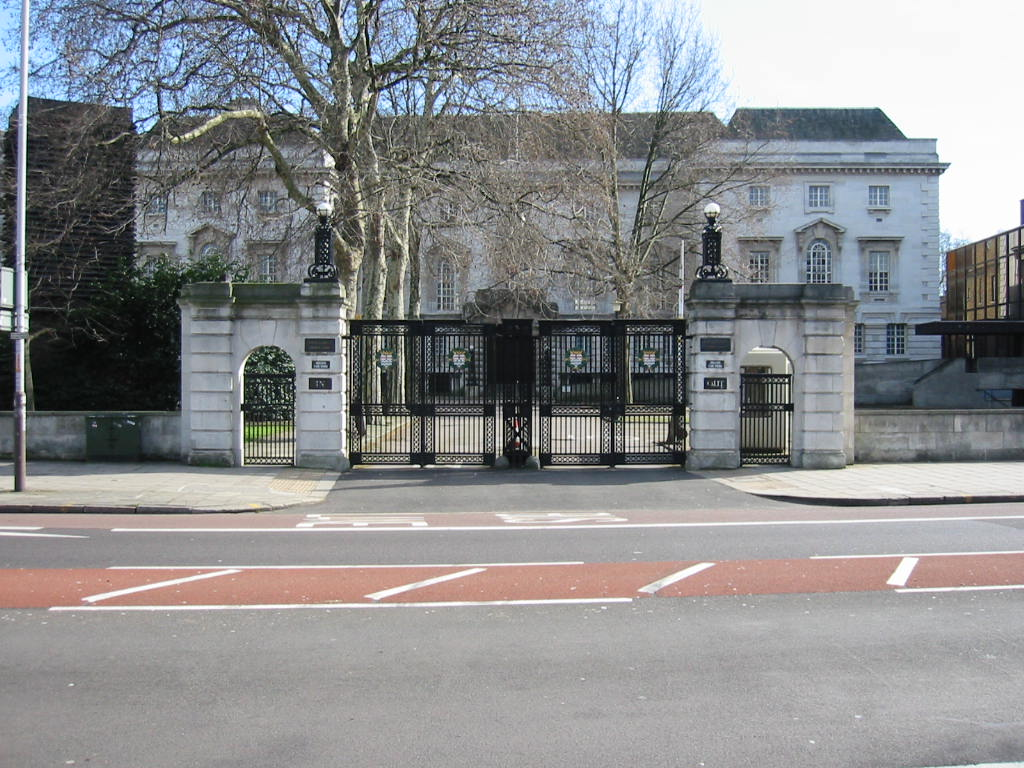
- Inner London Crown Court

- Location within London Borough of Southwark
- 51.4982°N 0.0967°W
- Location: London

History
- Built: 1921

Site notes
- Architect: W. E. Riley
- Architectural style: Classical style

Listed Building – Grade II
- Official name: Inner London Sessions Court
- Designated: 17 September 1998
- Reference no.: 1385732

The Inner London Sessions House Crown Court, more commonly known as the Inner London Crown Court is a Crown Court building in Newington, London, United Kingdom. It is located in the Sessions House on Newington Causeway at the corner of Harper Road. It is a Grade II listed building.

== History ==
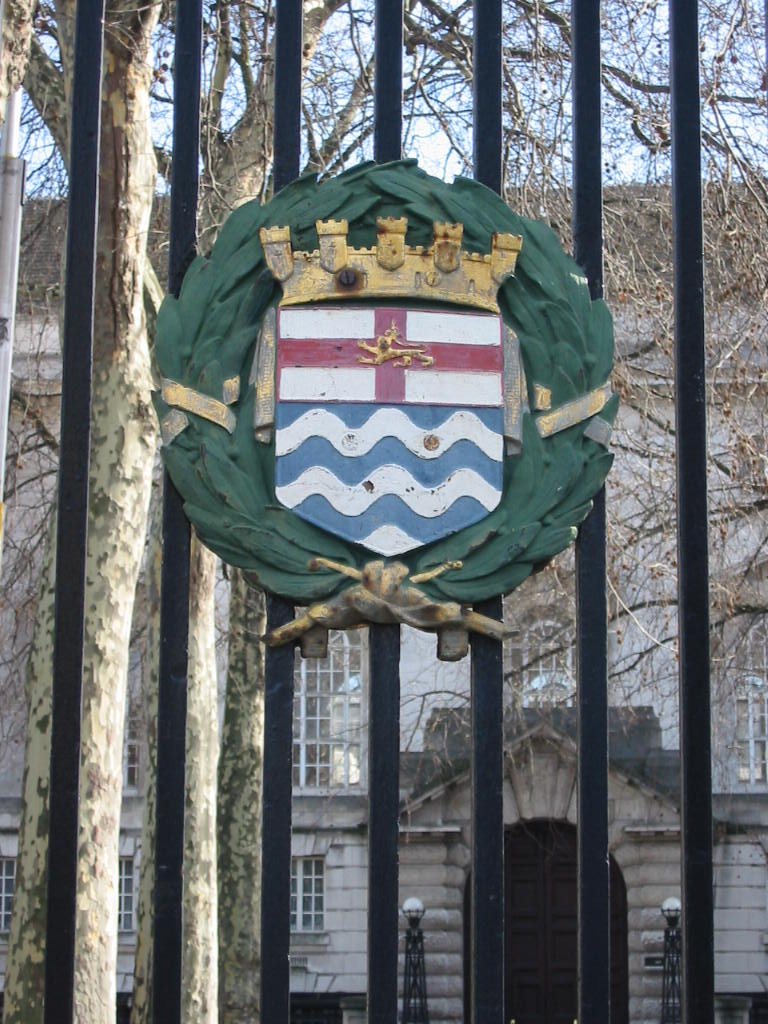
Coat of arms of London County Council on gates

The first building on the site was designed by George Gwilt the Elder and opened as the Surrey County Sessions House in 1791. It was adjacent to the Horsemonger Lane Gaol which was also designed by Gwilt. Important cases in the 19th century included the trial of the Reverend Robert Taylor who was convicted of blasphemy at the Surrey County Sessions in April 1831 and then committed to Horsemonger Lane Gaol. The gaol was demolished in 1881 and replaced by a public park, Newington Gardens, which opened in 1884. In London 19th-century cant it was called The Slaughter House, a reference to the executions that took place there.

Following local government re-organisation in 1889, London County Council inherited the Middlesex Sessions House, which was no longer in Middlesex, and the Surrey County Sessions House, which was no longer in Surrey. For a while the London county leaders decided to share the judicial work out between the two locations. After deciding this arrangement was inadequate for their needs, the justices decided to close the Middlesex Sessions House and rebuild the Newington Causeway Sessions House so that it could accommodate the extra judicial workload being transferred from Middlesex Sessions House. Meanwhile, the Surrey county leaders established new administrative facilities for themselves at County Hall in Kingston upon Thames in November 1893.

The new and expanded Sessions House was designed by the London county architect, W. E. Riley, in the classical style and was completed in 1921. The design involved a symmetrical main frontage of 11 bays facing Newington Causeway with the end three bays on each side slightly projected forwards; the central section of five bays featured an arched doorway with a pediment above; there were pedimented round headed windows on the first floor and small square windows on the second floor. The building was designated as a Crown Court venue in 1971 and was extended in 1974 to provide 10 courts for use on the South Eastern Circuit. An annex was also established just to the northeast in Swan Street.

Recent cases at the courthouse have included the trial following the 2009 Upton Park riot in August 2009: 80 people suspected of violence before and after the match were arrested and several West Ham fans were convicted in the courthouse of violent disorder in April 2010, receiving prison sentences, including one of 20 months.

== See also ==
- Southwark Crown Court
- Blackfriars Crown Court
