= Newington Causeway =

Street in the London Borough of Southwark

Coordinates: 51.4979°N 0.0984°W

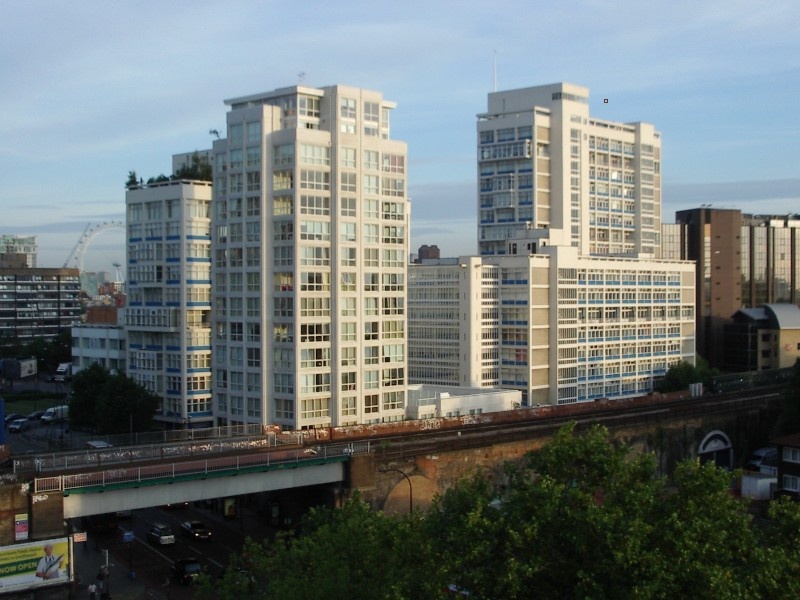
View of Metro Central Heights, designed by Ernő Goldfinger, at the southern end of Newington Causeway

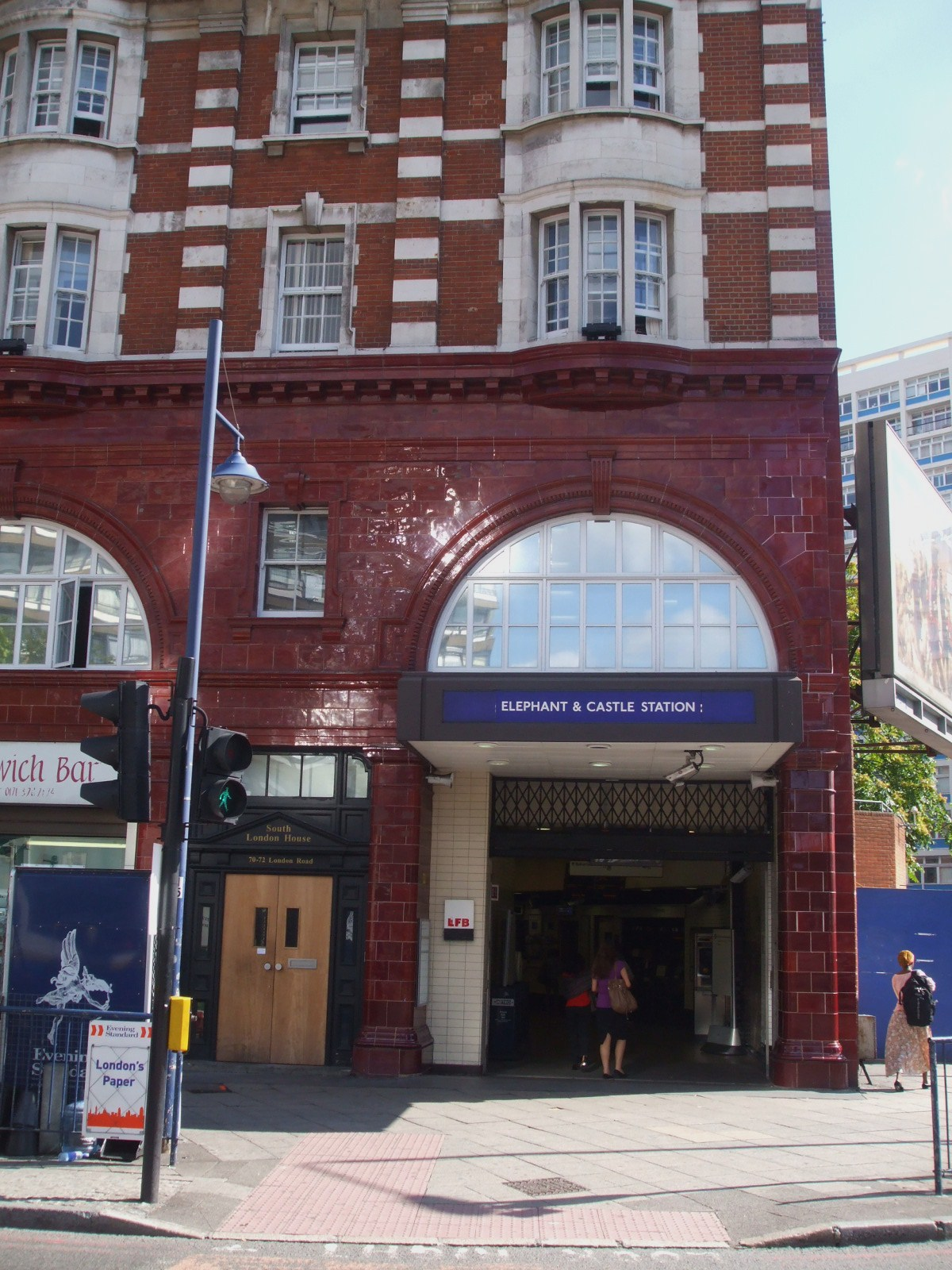
Entrance to the Elephant & Castle Underground station at the junction of Newington Causeway with the Elephant and Castle roundabout

Newington Causeway is a road in Southwark, London, between the Elephant and Castle and Borough High Street. Elephant & Castle Underground station is at the southern end. It follows the route of the old Roman road Stane Street.

In 1912, an outpatients' department of the South London Hospital for Women and Children was opened in Newington Causeway, using money raised by Harriet Shaw Weaver, publisher of The Freewoman, and other feminists.

Cecil Belfield Clarke, physician, originator of Clark's rule for the treatment of children, and a founder of the League of Coloured Peoples, lived and practised on Newington Causeway from the 1920's through the Second World War.

Metro Central Heights (originally known as Alexander Fleming House) -- an early 1960s series of multi-storey blocks designed by Ernő Goldfinger as office buildings subsequently converted into flats—stands at the southern end of the road. The Ministry of Sound, a famous nightclub, is in Gaunt Street just off Newington Causeway. This is also where the Inner London Sessions House, a Crown Court, and the Newington Court Business Centre are located.

The Institute of Optometry, formerly the London Refraction Hospital, is at 56–62 Newington Causeway. The Salvation Army UK and Republic of Ireland headquarters used to occupy a large building at 101 Newington Causeway.

The road forms part of the A3.

== Major adjoining roads and streets ==
- Borough High Street
- Borough Road
- Elephant and Castle roundabout
- Gaunt Street
- Harper Road
- Southwark Bridge Road

== See also ==
- Newington, London
