= Mole Valley District Council =

Non-metropolitan council in Surrey, England

Type
- Type: Non-metropolitan district

Leadership
- Chair: Simon Budd, Conservative since 19 May 2026
- Leader: Bridget Kendrick, Liberal Democrat since 20 May 2025
- Chief Executive: Karen Brimacombe since 2017

Structure
- Seats: 39 councillors
- Graph of the party split among 39 seats.
- Political groups: Administration (31) Liberal Democrats (31) Other parties (8) Independent (6) Conservative (2)

Elections
- Voting system: First past the post
- First election: 7 June 1973
- Last election: 2 May 2024

Meeting place
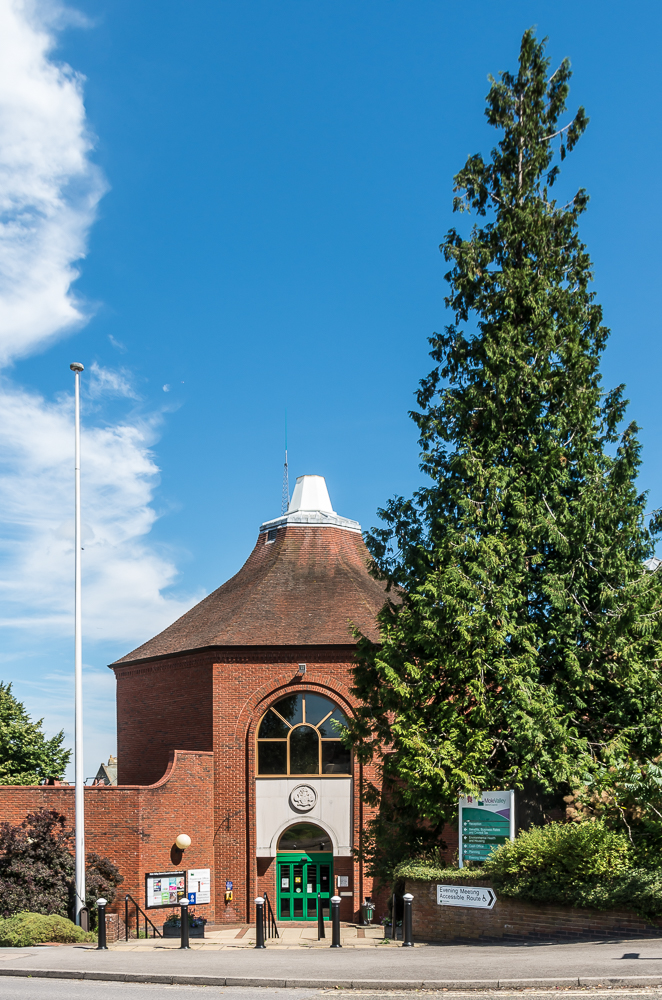
- Pippbrook, Dorking, RH4 1SH

Website
- www.molevalley.gov.uk

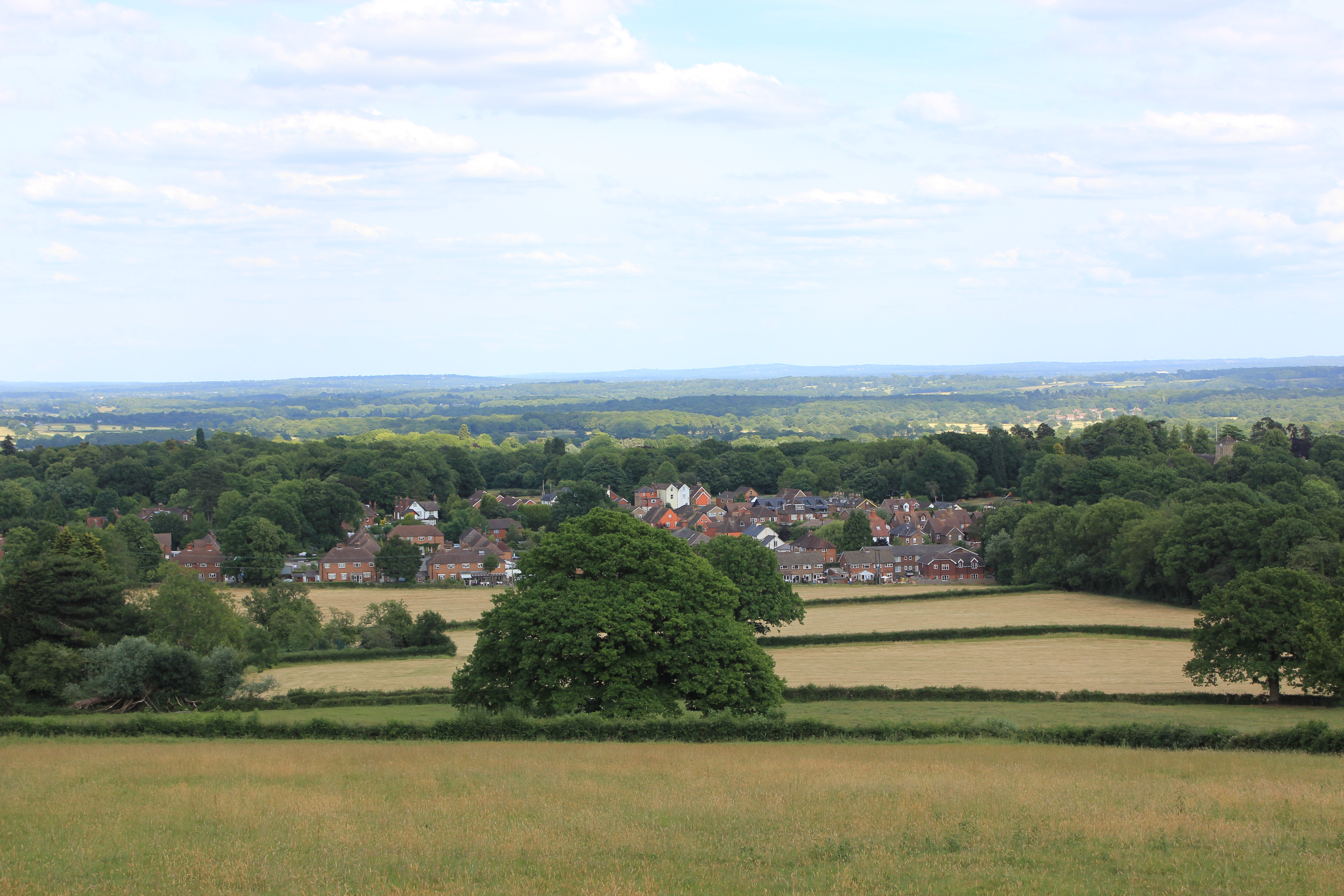
South Holmwood

Mole Valley District Council provides district-level services for the local government district of Mole Valley, in Surrey, in South East England. County-level services are provided by Surrey County Council. Parts of the district are covered by civil parishes, which form a third tier of local government for their areas.

Mole Valley District Council, along with all Surrey district councils and Surrey County Council will be abolished in 2027 as part of ongoing local government restructuring, with the area of Mole Valley to become part of East Surrey, administered by East Surrey Council.

== Political control ==
The council has been under Liberal Democrat majority control since 2019.

The first elections to the council were held in 1973, initially operating as a shadow authority alongside the outgoing authorities until the new arrangements came into effect on 1 April 1974. Political control of the council since 1974 has been as follows:

Party in control	Years
No overall control	1974–1980
Independent	1980–1982
No overall control	1982–1994
Liberal Democrats	1994–1995
No overall control	1995–2006
Conservative	2006–2010
No overall control	2010–2015
Conservative	2015–2018
No overall control	2018–2019
Liberal Democrats	2019–present

== Leadership ==
The leaders of the council since 2012 have been:

Councillor	Party	From	To
James Friend	Conservative		May 2012
Chris Townsend	Independent	May 2012	2015
James Friend	Conservative	May 2015	2016
Vivienne Michael	Conservative	2016	May 2019
Stephen Cooksey	Liberal Democrats	May 2019	20 May 2025
Bridget Kendrick	Liberal Democrats	20 May 2025	

== Composition ==
Following the 2024 election the composition of the council was:

Party	Councillors
Liberal Democrats	31
Ashtead Independents	6
Conservative	2
Total	39

== Elections ==
Since the last boundary changes in 2023 the council has comprised 39 councillors representing 13 wards, with each ward electing three councillors. Elections were held three years out of every four, with a third of the council (one councillor for each ward) elected each time for a four-year term of office. Surrey County Council elections were held in the fourth year of the cycle when there were no district council elections.

Further district council elections were cancelled in 2026, and an election for the new East Surrey Council was held instead. East Surrey Council will formally come into being and take over local government functions in the area on 1 April 2027, at which point Mole Valley District Council and the district of Mole Valley will be abolished.

Most of the district lies within the Mole Valley constituency, the exception being Ashtead which is within the Epsom and Ewell constituency.

== Premises ==
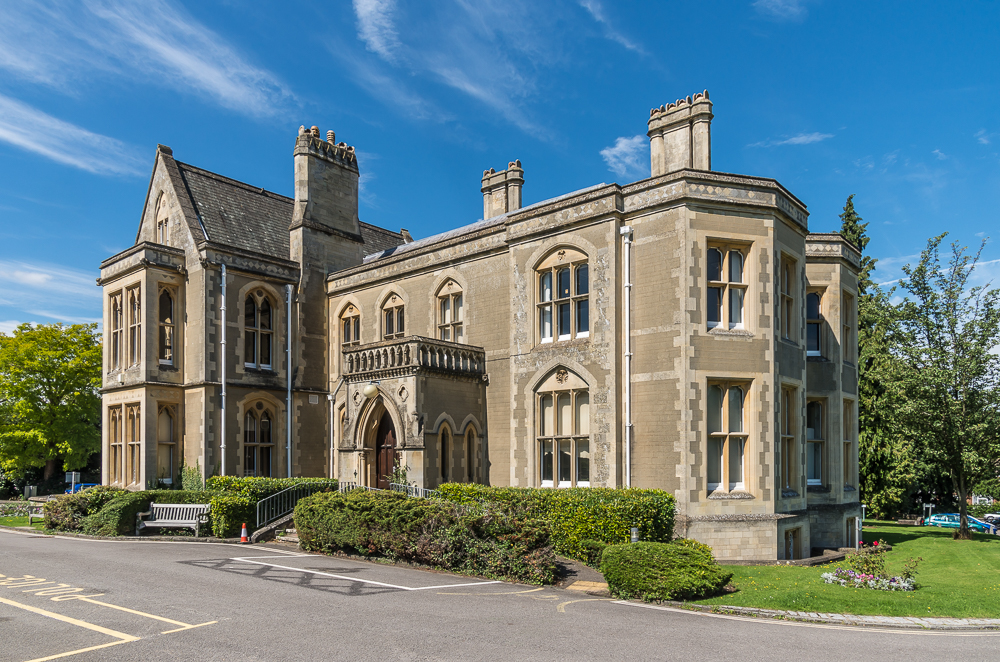
Pippbrook House: Council's offices until 1984.

The council is based at Pippbrook on Reigate Road in Dorking, which was purpose-built for the council and opened in 1984. It was built in the grounds of a large Victorian house, called Pippbrook House, which had served as the headquarters of the old Dorking Urban District Council from 1931 and then as Mole Valley District Council's headquarters until the new building opened.
