= Epsom and Ewell Borough Council elections =

Local government elections in Surrey, England

Epsom and Ewell Borough Council was elected every four years. It is notable for its long-standing control by a Residents' Association rather than one of the national political parties. The council is due to be abolished on 1 April 2027 following structural changes to local government in Surrey.

== Council composition ==
Composition of the council
Year	Residents Association	Conservative	Labour	Liberal Democrats (Note: Includes totals for the predecessors of the Liberal Democrats, the Liberal Party and SDP (both of which participated in the Alliance).)	Independents & Others	Council control after election
Local government reorganisation; council established (40 seats)
1973	34	0	6	0	0	Residents Association
New ward boundaries (39 seats)
1976	36	0	3	0	0	Residents Association
1979	34	0	3	2	0	Residents Association
1983	33	0	3	3	0	Residents Association
1987	35	0	3	1	0	Residents Association
New ward boundaries (42 seats)
1991	33	0	3	6	0	Residents Association
1995	33	0	3	3	0	Residents Association
1999	27	0	3	9	0	Residents Association
2003	27	2	3	6	0	Residents Association
2007	25	2	0	11	0	Residents Association
2011	26	3	3	6	0	Residents Association
2015	31	4	3	0	0	Residents Association
2019	23	1	3	2	0	Residents Association
New ward boundaries (35 seats)
2023	26	2	3	4	0	Residents Association

== Results maps ==
2003 results map

2007 results map

2011 results map

2015 results map

2019 results map

2023 results map

== By-election results ==
=== 1995–1999 ===
Court By-Election 3 July 1997
Party	Candidate	Votes	%	±%
Labour		459	80.0	−0.4
Liberal Democrats		74	12.9	−7.5
Conservative		44	7.7	+7.7
Majority		385	67.1	
Turnout		577	13.0	
Labour hold		Swing		

Stamford By-Election 3 July 1997
Party	Candidate	Votes	%	±%
Residents Association		566	44.8	−9.0
Liberal Democrats		523	41.4	+16.7
Labour		174	13.8	−7.8
Majority		43	3.4	
Turnout		1,263	33.0	
Residents Association hold		Swing		

College By-Election 30 October 1997
Party	Candidate	Votes	%	±%
Liberal Democrats	Julie Morris	481	44.1	+2.7
Residents Association		374	34.3	−24.3
Conservative	Chris Heaton-Harris	182	16.7	+16.7
Labour		54	5.0	+5.0
Majority		107	9.8	
Turnout		1,091	25.2	
Liberal Democrats gain from Residents Association		Swing		

=== 2003–2007 ===
Woodcote By-Election 17 March 2005
Party	Candidate	Votes	%	±%
Liberal Democrats	Lionel Blackman	558	34.7	+4.1
Conservative	Sean Sullivan	539	33.5	+1.8
Residents Association	Christopher Frost	436	27.1	−5.0
Labour	James Milne	74	4.6	−1.0
Majority		19	1.2	
Turnout		1,607	39.3	
Liberal Democrats gain from Residents Association		Swing		

Nonsuch By-Election 6 October 2005
Party	Candidate	Votes	%	±%
Residents Association	Christine Howells	539	65.0	−17.0
Conservative	Patrick Matier	183	22.1	+22.1
Liberal Democrats	Steve Dixon	95	11.5	−1.0
Labour	Paul Anthony	12	1.4	−4.2
Majority		256	42.9	
Turnout		829	19.8	
Residents Association hold		Swing		

Town By-Election 30 March 2006
Party	Candidate	Votes	%	±%
Liberal Democrats	Julie Morris	438	39.2	−3.0
Residents Association	Neil Dallen	373	33.4	+8.9
Conservative	Anton Irvine	205	18.3	−4.1
Labour	Katherine Chinn	102	9.1	−1.8
Majority		65	5.8	
Turnout		1,118	25.6	
Liberal Democrats hold		Swing		

Stoneleigh By-Election 11 May 2006
Party	Candidate	Votes	%	±%
Residents Association	Sandra Sanger	597	41.5	−1.0
Conservative	Christopher Muller	560	38.9	+0.1
Liberal Democrats	James Dapre	209	14.5	+2.9
Labour	William McGinniss	72	5.0	−2.1
Majority		37	2.6	
Turnout		1,438	38.4	
Residents Association gain from Conservative		Swing		

Ruxley By-Election 29 June 2006
Party	Candidate	Votes	%	±%
Residents Association	Michael Guest	313	36.0	−7.1
Conservative	Stephen Pontin	292	33.6	+15.5
Labour	James Milne	152	17.5	−11.6
Liberal Democrats	Margaret Derrett	66	7.6	−2.1
UKIP	Sheridan Wheeldon	46	5.3	+5.3
Majority		21	2.4	
Turnout		869	19.5	
Residents Association hold		Swing		

=== 2007–2011 ===
Court By-Election 26 February 2009
Party	Candidate	Votes	%	±%
Labour	Sheila Carlson	377	33.0	+2.3
Liberal Democrats	Julia Kirkland	343	30.0	−10.0
Conservative	James Petit	281	24.6	+7.6
Residents Association	Christine Beams	143	12.5	+0.2
Majority		34	3.0	
Turnout		1,144	26.9	
Labour gain from Liberal Democrats		Swing		

Ruxley By-Election 26 February 2009
Party	Candidate	Votes	%	±%
Conservative	William Keen	564	51.3	+13.0
Residents Association	Michael Guest	363	33.0	−11.7
Labour	Andy Carlson	73	6.6	−2.6
Liberal Democrats	Margaret Derritt	60	5.5	−2.2
UKIP	Janet Taylor	40	3.6	+3.6
Majority		201	18.3	
Turnout		1,101	24.5	
Conservative gain from Residents Association		Swing		

=== 2015–2019 ===
Ruxley By-Election 15 February 2018
Party	Candidate	Votes	%	±%
Residents Association	Alex Coley	398	37.2	−7.5
Conservative	Stephen Pontin	340	31.8	−0.6
Labour	Themba Msika	264	24.7	+10.5
Liberal Democrats	Julia Kirkland	67	6.3	−2.4
Majority		58	5.4	
Turnout		1,069	23.4	
Residents Association hold		Swing		

Nonsuch By-Election 20 September 2018
Party	Candidate	Votes	%	±%
Residents Association	Colin Keane	766	68.0	+9.0
Conservative	Alastair Whitby	227	20.2	−5.5
Liberal Democrats	Julian Freeman	92	8.2	−0.1
Labour	Rosalind Godson	41	3.6	−3.5
Majority		539	47.9	
Turnout		1,126	24.9	
Residents Association hold		Swing		

=== 2019–2023 ===
Cuddington By-Election 23 September 2021
Party	Candidate	Votes	%	±%
Residents Association	Graham Jones	585	56.0	−9.1
Labour	Kevin Davies	207	19.8	+9.2
Conservative	George Bushati	135	12.9	+1.2
Liberal Democrats	Dan Brown	117	11.2	−1.5
Majority		378	36.2	
Turnout		1,044	23.1	
Residents Association hold		Swing		

West Ewell By-Election 7 July 2022
Party	Candidate	Votes	%	±%
Residents Association	Alan Williamson	549	43.4	−27.9
Labour	Mark Todd	395	31.2	+20.2
Conservative	Kieran Persand	205	16.2	+7.8
Liberal Democrats	Marian Morrison	117	9.2	−0.2
Majority		154	12.2	
Turnout		1,266		
Residents Association hold		Swing		
