= 2024 Tandridge District Council election =

Local election in Tandridge, England

← 2023	2 May 2024	2026 (ESC) →

All 43 seats to Tandridge District Council 22 seats needed for a majority

	Majority party	Minority party	Third party
Leader	Catherine Sayer	Jeffrey Gray	Robin Bloore
Party	Residents' Alliance	Liberal Democrats	Conservative
Leader's seat	Oxted North	Whyteleafe	Warlingham West
Seats before	18	11	9
Seats after	20	11	7
Seat change	▲2	Steady	▼2
- Results by ward (Residents (various) in pink, OLRDG in lime, independents in grey, Liberal Democrats in orange, and Conservatives in blue)
Leader before election
Catherine Sayer
Residents' Alliance
No overall control
Elected Leader
Catherine Sayer
Residents' Alliance
No overall control

The 2024 Tandridge District Council election was held on Thursday 2 May 2024, alongside the other local elections in the United Kingdom held on the same day. All 43 members of Tandridge District Council in Surrey were elected following boundary changes. The local residents' association (composed of independent councillors and Oxted and Limpsfield Residents Group councillors) managed to increase their seat count, but fell two seats short of gaining majority control of the council.

== Background ==
Tandridge was a historically Conservative council. The Conservatives held a majority on the council until 1990, when the Liberal Democrats became the largest party. They briefly retook the council in 1994, before losing it to no overall control again in 1995. The Conservatives formed a majority administration in 2000, which lasted until 2019.

Following the previous election, independents had a total of 14 seats (up 2), the Liberal Democrats had 11, the Conservatives had 9 (down 2), and the Oxted and Limpsfield Residents Group had 8. The Oxted and Limpsfield Residents Group and 10 independents run the council as a minority administration.

== Boundary changes ==
Tandridge usually elects its councillors in thirds, on a 4-year cycle. However, following boundary changes, all councillors will be elected to the new wards. The change increases the number of councillors by 1.

Old wards	No. of seats	New wards	No. of seats
Bletchingley and Nutfield	3	Bletchingley and Nutfield	3
Burstow, Horne and Outwood	3	Burstow, Horne and Outwood	3
Chaldon	1	Chaldon	1
Dormansland and Felcourt	2	Dormansland and Felbridge	3
Felbridge	1	Godstone	3
Godstone	3	Harestone	2
Harestone	2	Limpsfield	2
Limpsfield	2	Lingfield and Crowhurst	3
Lingfield and Crowhurst	2	Oxted North	3
Oxted North and Tandridge	3	Oxted South	3
Oxted South	3	Portley and Queens Park	3
Portley	2	Tatsfield and Titsey	1
Queens Park	2	Valley	2
Tatsfield and Titsey	1	Warlingham East and Chelsham and Farleigh	3
Valley	2	Warlingham West	2
Warlingham East and Chelsham and Farleigh	3	Westway	3
Warlingham West	2	Whyteleafe	2
Westway	2	Woldingham	1
Whyteleafe	2		
Woldingham	1		

== Previous council composition and election results ==
Tandridge District Council following the 2024 local elections

No council seats changed hands between the previous election and this election.

After 2023 election		After 2024 election	
Party	Seats	Party	Seats
Independent (Residents’ Alliance)	10	Independent (Residents’ Alliance)	12
Oxted and Limpsfield Residents Group (OLRG)	8	Oxted and Limpsfield Residents Group (OLRG)	8
RA total	18	RA total	20
Liberal Democrats	11	Liberal Democrats	11
Conservative	9	Conservative	7
Independent	4	Independent	5
Total	42	Total	43

== Ward results ==
The results were as follows, with an asterisk (*) indicating a sitting councillor standing for re-election.

=== Bletchingley & Nutfield ===
Bletchingley & Nutfield (3 seats)
Party	Candidate	Votes	%	±%
Independent	Helena Windsor*	640	40.0	
Bletchingley & Nutfield Residents	Louise Case	518	32.4	
Liberal Democrats	Richard Fowler	501	31.3	
Conservative	Liam Hammond*	495	30.9	
Liberal Democrats	Susan Hickson	366	22.9	
Liberal Democrats	Martin Redman	348	21.7	
Conservative	Iain Carter	343	21.4	
Green	Emily Malkin	271	16.9	
Labour	Linda Baharier	218	13.6	
Labour	Barbara Wantling	195	12.2	
Heritage	Graham Bailey	168	10.5	
Labour	Graham Powell	145	9.1	
Turnout		1,601	35.9	
Registered electors		4,461		
Independent win (new seat)				
Residents win (new seat)				
Liberal Democrats win (new seat)				

=== Burstow, Horne & Outwood ===
Burstow, Horne & Outwood (3 seats)
Party	Candidate	Votes	%	±%
Burstow, Horne & Outwood Residents	Ashleigh Bolton	825	58.1	
Burstow, Horne & Outwood Residents	Sue Farr*	800	56.3	
Burstow, Horne & Outwood Residents	Richard Smith*	799	56.3	
Conservative	Theo Harris	361	25.4	
Labour	Stephen Case-Green	197	13.9	
Green	Elliott McLean de Boer	189	13.3	
Labour	Matthew Allen	180	12.7	
Liberal Democrats	Judy Wilkinson	171	12.0	
Labour	Andrew McLean	147	10.4	
Turnout		1,420	29.2	
Registered electors		4,864		
Residents win (new seat)				
Residents win (new seat)				
Residents win (new seat)				

=== Chaldon ===
Chaldon (1 seat)
Party	Candidate	Votes	%	±%
Conservative	Lewis Sharp*	367	65.8	
Liberal Democrats	Neil Parker	113	20.3	
Green	Rebecca Gower	78	14.0	
Turnout		558	39.8	
Registered electors		1,411		
Conservative win (new seat)				

=== Dormansland & Felbridge ===
Dormansland & Felbridge (3 seats)
Party	Candidate	Votes	%	±%
Conservative	Lesley Steeds*	705	42.9	
Dormansland & Felbridge Residents	Nicholas White*	655	39.9	
Dormansland & Felbridge Residents	Nicola O'Riordan*	591	36.0	
Independent	Judy Moore*	565	34.4	
Conservative	Maureen Young	458	27.9	
Conservative	Nigel Lea	328	20.0	
Green	Becky Peterson	273	16.6	
Liberal Democrats	David Nickols	193	11.7	
Liberal Democrats	Roger Martin	179	10.9	
Labour	Richard Clarke	168	10.2	
Labour	Emba Jones	145	8.8	
Turnout		1,643	37.3	
Registered electors		4,404		
Conservative win (new seat)				
Residents win (new seat)				
Residents win (new seat)				

=== Godstone ===
Godstone (3 seats)
Party	Candidate	Votes	%	±%
Godstone Residents	Mike Crane*	1,051	71.9	
Godstone Residents	Chris Farr*	1,037	70.9	
Godstone Residents	Colin White*	1,018	69.6	
Labour	Amy Hare	207	14.2	
Conservative	Oliver Watkins	205	14.0	
Conservative	Hoong-Wai Cheah	175	12.0	
Turnout		1,462	32.3	
Registered electors		4,528		
Residents win (new seat)				
Residents win (new seat)				
Residents win (new seat)				

=== Harestone ===
Harestone (2 seats)
Party	Candidate	Votes	%	±%
Liberal Democrats	Annette Evans*	697	55.0	
Liberal Democrats	Robin Spencer	531	41.9	
Conservative	Michael Casebourne	468	36.9	
Conservative	Mark Winsbury	378	29.8	
Labour	Carron Walker	127	10.0	
Labour	Thomas Holloway	101	8.0	
Turnout		1,267	39.4	
Registered electors		3,215		
Liberal Democrats win (new seat)				
Liberal Democrats win (new seat)				

=== Limpsfield ===
Limpsfield (2 seats)
Party	Candidate	Votes	%	±%
OLRG	Claire Blackwell*	1,051	82.1	
OLRG	Ian Booth*	996	77.8	
Conservative	Robert Brewer	144	11.3	
Conservative	Bernice Milton	116	9.1	
Liberal Democrats	Rupert McCann	113	8.8	
Turnout		1,280	44.7	
Registered electors		2,864		
OLRG win (new seat)				
OLRG win (new seat)				

=== Lingfield & Crowhurst ===
Lingfield & Crowhurst (3 seats)
Party	Candidate	Votes	%	±%
Lingfield & Crowhurst Residents	Julie Duggan	739	46.8	
Lingfield & Crowhurst Residents	Peter Killick	684	43.3	
Independent	Liz Lockwood	584	37.0	
Lingfield & Crowhurst Residents	Alan Schmidt	521	33.0	
Labour	Ryan Howard	360	22.8	
Labour	Freyja Chapman	305	19.3	
Labour	Joseph Pettitt	272	17.2	
Conservative	Anthony Beck	253	16.0	
Conservative	Paul Greenhalgh	241	15.3	
Liberal Democrats	Dave Wilkes	190	12.0	
Conservative	Arman Shahjid	161	10.1	
Turnout		1,588	36.3	
Registered electors		4,375		
Residents win (new seat)				
Residents win (new seat)				
Independent win (new seat)				

=== Oxted North ===
Oxted North (3 seats)
Party	Candidate	Votes	%	±%
OLRG	Catherine Sayer*	1,570	79.9	
OLRG	Peter Damesick*	1,531	78.0	
OLRG	Chris Bassett	1,481	75.4	
Conservative	Janet Brealey	186	9.5	
Green	Ian Giddings	186	9.5	
Labour	Louis Labrosse	170	8.7	
Conservative	Laurence Hatchwell	153	7.8	
Conservative	Matthew Hatchwell	149	7.6	
Labour	Philip Son	146	7.4	
Heritage	Christopher Dean	21	1.1	
Turnout		1,964	44.4	
Registered electors		4,424		
OLRG win (new seat)				
OLRG win (new seat)				
OLRG win (new seat)				

=== Oxted South ===
Oxted South (3 seats)
Party	Candidate	Votes	%	±%
OLRG	Deb Shiner*	1,096	69.8	
OLRG	Chris Langton*	1,079	68.7	
OLRG	Bryan Black*	1,071	68.2	
Labour	David Halliwell	265	16.9	
Labour	Patricia Hunter	263	16.7	
Labour	Mark Dean	254	16.2	
Conservative	Elizabeth Parker	235	15.0	
Conservative	Nicolas Cook	144	9.2	
Conservative	Marjory Budgen	126	8.0	
Turnout		1,571	35.8	
Registered electors		4,389		
OLRG win (new seat)				
OLRG win (new seat)				
OLRG win (new seat)				

=== Portley & Queens Park ===
Portley & Queens Park (3 seats)
Party	Candidate	Votes	%	±%
Liberal Democrats	Ben Horne	767	45.3	
Conservative	Michael Cooper*	637	37.6	
Conservative	Richard Mark	499	29.5	
Caterham Residents	Susan Berns	493	29.1	
Conservative	Linda Jenkins	468	27.6	
Labour	Jane Lopez	352	20.8	
Labour	Nick Bray	336	19.8	
Labour	Steven Willmott	277	16.4	
Turnout		1,694	35.3	
Registered electors		4,798		
Liberal Democrats win (new seat)				
Conservative win (new seat)				
Conservative win (new seat)				

=== Tatsfield & Titsey ===
Tatsfield & Titsey (1 seat)
Party	Candidate	Votes	%	±%
Independent	Martin Allen*	423	70.0	
Conservative	Kenneth Budgen	129	21.4	
Green	Sarah Stewart	52	8.6	
Turnout		604	39.6	
Registered electors		1,535		
Independent win (new seat)				

=== Valley ===
Valley (2 seats)
Party	Candidate	Votes	%	±%
Liberal Democrats	Alun Jones*	628	59.0	
Liberal Democrats	Jenny Gaffney*	584	54.9	
Caterham Residents	Peter Roberts	302	28.4	
Conservative	Max Barry	155	14.6	
Labour	Anne Watson	134	12.6	
Labour	Nicole Morrigan	116	10.9	
Turnout		1,064	32.6	
Registered electors		3,265		
Liberal Democrats win (new seat)				
Liberal Democrats win (new seat)				

=== Warlingham East, Chelsham & Farleigh ===
Warlingham East, Chelsham & Farleigh (3 seats)
Party	Candidate	Votes	%	±%
Independent	Jeremy Pursehouse*	850	51.3	
Liberal Democrats	Perry Chotai*	506	30.6	
Liberal Democrats	Anna Patel*	499	30.1	
Independent	Martin Strzebrakowski	495	29.9	
Conservative	Nathan Adams	494	29.8	
Conservative	Marc Lamont	268	16.2	
Conservative	Michael Whittington	246	14.9	
Labour	Julian Cresswell	200	12.1	
Labour	Daniel Mann	118	7.1	
Turnout		1,656	38.2	
Registered electors		4,336		
Independent win (new seat)				
Liberal Democrats win (new seat)				
Liberal Democrats win (new seat)				

=== Warlingham West ===
Warlingham West (2 seats)
Party	Candidate	Votes	%	±%
Conservative	Robin Bloore*	596	50.6	
Conservative	Keith Prew*	492	41.8	
Liberal Democrats	Ed Ralph	333	28.3	
Liberal Democrats	Don Mackinlay	277	23.5	
Independent	Martin Haley	144	12.2	
Labour	Steven Bracey	132	11.2	
Labour	Andrew Waters	131	11.1	
Turnout		1,177	36.8	
Registered electors		3,199		
Conservative win (new seat)				
Conservative win (new seat)				

=== Westway ===
Westway (3 seats)
Party	Candidate	Votes	%	±%
Liberal Democrats	James Rujbally	622	43.1	
Liberal Democrats	Sarah Sowambur	571	39.5	
Conservative	Ankita Sharma	423	29.3	
Conservative	Charlie Kelly	412	28.5	
Conservative	Mike Steddy	406	28.1	
Labour	Robin Clements	405	28.0	
Labour	Roy Stewart	360	24.9	
Labour	Adam Avery	345	23.9	
Turnout		1,444	28.2	
Registered electors		5,119		
Liberal Democrats win (new seat)				
Liberal Democrats win (new seat)				
Conservative win (new seat)				

=== Whyteleafe ===
Whyteleafe (2 seats)
Party	Candidate	Votes	%	±%
Whyteleafe Residents	Deano Cline	441	46.7	
Liberal Democrats	Jeffrey Gray*	313	33.2	
Whyteleafe Residents	Marcus Jones	302	32.0	
Liberal Democrats	Dave Evans	233	24.7	
Labour	Rosa Knight	116	12.3	
Conservative	Joseph Eve	97	10.3	
Conservative	Harry Millar	85	9.0	
Green	Jessica Hibberd	53	5.6	
Labour	Annie Weller	52	5.5	
Turnout		944	30.2	
Registered electors		3,126		
Residents win (new seat)				
Liberal Democrats win (new seat)				

=== Woldingham ===
Woldingham (1 seat)
Party	Candidate	Votes	%	±%
Independent	Deborah Sherry	477	70.8	
Conservative	Sakina Bradbury	120	17.8	
Labour	Nathan Manning	46	6.8	
Liberal Democrats	Nick Pomery	31	4.6	
Turnout		674	42.2	
Registered electors		1,589		
Independent win (new seat)				

== By-Elections ==
=== Oxted South ===
Oxted South by-election: 1 May 2025
Party	Candidate	Votes	%	±%
OLRG	Mark Stringer	890	69.0	
Conservative	Iain David Carter	217	16.8	
Labour	Pat Hunter	109	8.5	
Liberal Democrats	Rupert James McCann	67	5.2	
Turnout		1289	29.4	
Registered electors		4,413		
OLRG hold				

=== Whyteleafe ===
Whyteleafe by-election: 16 October 2025
Party	Candidate	Votes	%	±%
Liberal Democrats	Tony Pearce	259	45.0	▲14.3
Reform	James Milmine	154	26.7	N/A
Conservative	Hoong-Wai Cheah	57	9.9	▲0.4
Labour	Jon Wheale	55	9.5	▼1.9
Green	Leo Domingues	51	8.9	▲3.7
Majority		105	18.3	N/A
Turnout		576	18.6	▼11.6
Liberal Democrats hold				

=== Lingfield, Crowhurst and Tandridge ===
Lingfield, Crowhurst and Tandridge by-election: 6 November 2025
Party	Candidate	Votes	%	±%
Residents	Alan Schmidt	457	38.0	+3.2
Reform	Julia Searle	329	27.3	N/A
Independent	Judy Moore	158	13.1	N/A
Conservative	Paul Greenhalgh	128	10.6	–1.3
Liberal Democrats	Dave Wilkes	90	7.5	–1.4
Labour	Freyja Chapman	42	3.5	–13.4
Majority		128	10.7	N/A
Turnout		1,204	28.0	–8.3
Residents hold				

=== Westway ===
Westway by-election: 6 November 2025
Party	Candidate	Votes	%	±%
Liberal Democrats	Martin Redman	539	42.3	–0.6
Reform	Sarah Barwick	420	33.0	N/A
Conservative	Ethna Webster	202	15.9	–13.3
Labour	Robin Clements	112	8.8	–19.1
Majority		119	9.3	N/A
Turnout		1,273	25.5	–2.7
Liberal Democrats gain from Conservative				
