= East Surrey =

- Future unitary authority area
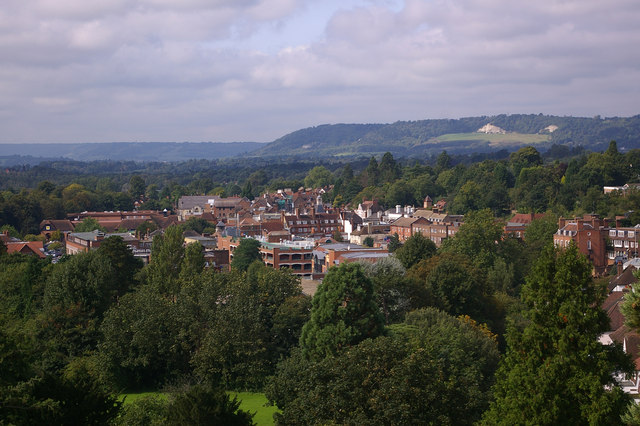
- View over Reigate towards the North Downs

- East Surrey shown within Surrey
- Interactive map of East Surrey
- Coordinates: 51.249°N 0.160°W
- Sovereign state: United Kingdom
- Country: England
- Region: South East
- Ceremonial county: Surrey
- Incorporated: 1 April 2027
- Administrative HQ: Reigate

Government
  - Type: Unitary authority
  - Body: East Surrey Council

Population (2024 estimate)
  - Total: 563,643
- Time zone: UTC+0 (GMT)
  - Summer (DST): UTC+1 (BST)
- GSS code: E06000067

East Surrey will be a unitary authority area which will be created in Surrey, England on 1 April 2027. It replaces five districts. The local authority will be East Surrey Council.

== History ==
East Surrey was announced as one of two new areas for local government in Surrey as part of the ongoing reorganisation of local government.

== Geography ==
The area will be formed from the five existing districts of Elmbridge, Epsom and Ewell, Mole Valley, Reigate and Banstead and Tandridge.

== Governance ==
The local authority will be East Surrey Council. The first councillors were elected in the 2026 East Surrey Council election.

In the current district of Mole Valley, parishes in Box Hill, Dorking and Westcott will be established in 2027. The district councils of Reigate and Banstead, and Runnymede are considering whether to introduce civil parishes and thus town councils for the unparished areas in those districts. Epsom and Ewell has decided not to create civil parishes.

== See also ==
- West Surrey
