= 2019 Epsom and Ewell Borough Council election =

Epsom and Ewell Borough Council election

- 2 May 2019

All 38 seats on Epsom and Ewell Borough Council 20 seats needed for a majority
- Turnout: 53,937

	First party	Second party	Third party
Party	Residents Association	Conservative	Liberal Democrats
Seats before	31	4	0
Seats won	32	1	2
Seat change	▲1	▼3	▲2
Popular vote	32,621	7,699	7,093
Percentage	60.5%	14.3%	13.2%
	Fourth party	Fifth party
Party	Labour	Green
Seats before	3	0
Seats won	3	0
Seat change	Steady	Steady
Popular vote	5,918	606
Percentage	11.0%	1.1%
- Map of the results of the 2019 Epsom and Ewell Borough Council election. RAEE in pink, Labour in red, Liberal Democrats in orange, and Conservatives in blue.

The 2019 Epsom and Ewell Borough Council election took place on 2 May 2019 to elect members of Epsom and Ewell Borough Council. This was on the same day as other local elections. The entire council (38 seats) was up for election. The result was a gain for the incumbent Residents Associations of Epsom and Ewell, gaining 2 seats from the Conservatives but losing 1 to them as well. The Liberal Democrats regained representation on the council, gaining 2 seats from the Conservatives.

== Results summary ==
Epsom and Ewell Borough Council election result 2019
Party	Seats	Gains	Losses	Net gain/loss	Seats %	Votes %	Votes	+/−
Residents Association	32	2	1	+1	84.2	60.5	32,621	+14.5
Labour	3	0	0	-	7.9	11.0	5,918	-5.0
Liberal Democrats	2	2	0	+2	5.3	13.2	7,093	+6.2
Conservative	1	1	4	-3	2.6	14.3	7,699	-16.3
Green	0	0	0	-	0.0	1.1	606	+0.8

The Residents Associations of Epsom and Ewell consists of:

- College Ward Residents' Association
- Cuddington Residents' Association
- Epsom Town Residents' Association
- Ewell Court Residents' Association
- Association of Ewell Downs Residents
- Ewell Village Residents' Association
- Nonsuch Park & District Residents' Association
- Stamford Ward Residents' Association
- Stoneleigh and Auriol Residents' Association
- West Ewell and Ruxley Residents' Association
- Woodcote Epsom Residents' Society

== Results by ward ==
=== Auriol ===
Auriol
Party	Candidate	Votes	%
Residents Association	John Beckett	889	83.3
Residents Association	Peter Webb	838	78.5
Conservative	William Pontin	81	7.6
Conservative	Keew Ng	71	6.7
Labour	Julia Lucas	69	6.5
Labour	Nora Pearce	62	5.8
Liberal Democrats	Rachel Sumeray	45	4.2
Turnout		1,067	34.68
Registered electors		3,085	
Rejected ballots		3	0.3
Residents Association hold			
Residents Association hold			

=== College ===
College
Party	Candidate	Votes	%
Liberal Democrats	Julie Morris	864	45.2
Liberal Democrats	David Gulland	838	43.9
Residents Association	Nigel Collin	749	39.2
Liberal Democrats	Andrej Kubicek	738	38.6
Residents Association	Christine Long	649	34.0
Residents Association	Robert Leach	645	33.8
Conservative	Alexander Clarke	323	16.9
Conservative	Gjergj Bushati	255	13.4
Conservative	Alastair Whitby	252	13.2
Labour	Margaret Lewis	136	7.1
Labour	Rosalind Godson	131	6.9
Turnout		1,910	45.26
Registered electors		4,233	
Rejected ballots		6	0.3
Liberal Democrats gain from Conservative			
Liberal Democrats gain from Conservative			
Residents Association gain from Conservative			

=== Court ===
Court
Party	Candidate	Votes	%
Labour	Kate Chinn	601	46.6
Labour	Rob Geleit	589	45.7
Labour	Debbie Monksfield	571	44.3
Residents Association	Christine Beams	396	30.7
Residents Association	Mary Sullivan	365	28.3
Residents Association	David Triggs	329	25.5
Conservative	Gordon Paterson	186	14.4
Conservative	Alexander Peacock	186	14.4
Conservative	Simon Smyth	164	12.7
Liberal Democrats	David Buxton	155	12.0
Liberal Democrats	Oliver Schuster	131	10.2
Liberal Democrats	Dorothee Wilbs	116	9.0
Turnout		1,289	26.06
Registered electors		4,985	
Rejected ballots		10	0.8
Labour hold			
Labour hold			
Labour hold			

=== Cuddington ===
Cuddington
Party	Candidate	Votes	%
Residents Association	Robert Foote	977	70.3
Residents Association	Lucie Dallen	969	69.7
Residents Association	Phillip Neale	962	69.2
Liberal Democrats	Raj Saini	190	13.7
Conservative	Jennifer Arkwell	175	12.6
Conservative	Paul Crispin	160	11.5
Labour	Marita Gerrard	159	11.4
Labour	Kevin Davies	136	9.8
Labour	Godfrey Mason	124	8.9
Conservative	John Earnshaw	118	8.5
Turnout		1,390	31.00
Registered electors		4,490	
Rejected ballots		2	0.1
Residents Association hold			
Residents Association hold			
Residents Association hold			

=== Ewell ===
Ewell
Party	Candidate	Votes	%
Residents Association	Christine Cleveland	922	69.0
Residents Association	Clive Woodbridge	903	67.6
Residents Association	Humphrey Reynolds	887	66.4
Conservative	Tony Kitcat	155	11.6
Liberal Democrats	Tony Fincham	140	10.5
Conservative	David Price	140	10.5
Labour	Sandra Hatfield	139	10.4
Liberal Democrats	Philip Pavey	138	10.3
Conservative	Diane Earnshaw	134	10.0
Liberal Democrats	Kenneth Kimber	129	9.7
Labour	Samuel Woodall	126	9.4
Labour	Michael Westbrook	124	9.3
Turnout		1,336	31.18
Registered electors		4,310	
Rejected ballots		8	0.6
Residents Association hold			
Residents Association hold			
Residents Association hold			

=== Ewell Court ===
Ewell Court
Party	Candidate	Votes	%
Residents Association	Eber Kington	1,241	85.6
Residents Association	Peter O'Donovan	1,167	80.5
Residents Association	Guy Robbins	1,139	78.6
Conservative	Colm Egan	122	8.4
Conservative	Danny Fullilove	117	8.1
Labour	Mike Nelson	101	7.0
Conservative	Andrew Sharpe	101	7.0
Labour	Naim Salam	92	6.3
Liberal Democrats	Lee Robertson	85	5.9
Turnout		1,450	33.56
Registered electors		4,333	
Rejected ballots		4	0.3
Residents Association hold			
Residents Association hold			
Residents Association hold			

=== Nonsuch ===
Nonsuch
Party	Candidate	Votes	%
Residents Association	Christine Howells	1,124	80.2
Residents Association	Christopher Frost	1,079	77.0
Residents Association	Colin Keane	1,058	75.5
Liberal Democrats	Steve Dixon	140	10.0
Liberal Democrats	Linda Chimiel	132	9.4
Conservative	Peter Chan	118	8.4
Conservative	Geoffrey Pope	116	8.3
Liberal Democrats	Joao de Campos Cruz	113	8.1
Conservative	Linda Trompetto	101	7.2
Labour	Alexander Edwards	62	4.4
Labour	Ian Ward	49	3.5
Turnout		1,401	31.02
Registered electors		4,536	
Rejected ballots		6	0.4
Residents Association hold			
Residents Association hold			
Residents Association hold			

=== Ruxley ===
Ruxley
Party	Candidate	Votes	%
Residents Association	Janet Mason	769	66.7
Residents Association	Alex Coley	747	64.8
Residents Association	Alan Sursham	703	61.0
Labour	Susanna Bellino	146	12.7
Labour	Jason Anderson	138	12.0
Conservative	David Collins	138	12.0
Conservative	Joseph Alawo	133	11.5
Conservative	David Lyndsay	133	11.5
Labour	Ghazal Diani	130	11.3
Liberal Democrats	Julia Kirkland	97	8.4
Liberal Democrats	Ashley Day	76	6.6
Liberal Democrats	Adam Pettifer	67	5.8
Turnout		1,153	25.23
Registered electors		4,589	
Rejected ballots		5	0.4
Residents Association hold			
Residents Association hold			
Residents Association hold			

=== Stamford ===
Stamford
Party	Candidate	Votes	%
Residents Association	Steve Bridger	730	36.4
Conservative	Bernadette Muir	697	34.8
Residents Association	Previn Jagutpal	679	33.9
Conservative	James Petit	658	32.9
Residents Association	Martin Olney	657	32.8
Conservative	Stephen Pontin	593	29.6
Green	Janice Baker	362	18.1
Liberal Democrats	Clare Clark	312	15.6
Liberal Democrats	Paul Vagg	307	15.3
Labour	Alexandra Payne	216	10.8
Liberal Democrats	Jeremy Smith	215	10.7
Labour	Garrick Bigwood	169	8.4
Labour	Amos Sibanda	139	6.9
Turnout		2,003	37.39
Registered electors		5,373	
Rejected ballots		6	0.3
Residents Association hold			
Conservative gain from Residents Association			
Residents Association hold			

=== Stoneleigh ===
Stoneleigh
Party	Candidate	Votes	%
Residents Association	Hannah Dalton	1,040	82.2
Residents Association	David Reeve	1,040	82.2
Residents Association	Christopher Webb	994	78.6
Liberal Democrats	Yvonne Dowling	84	6.6
Conservative	James Larter	78	6.2
Liberal Democrats	James Dapre	77	6.1
Liberal Democrats	Brian Fisher	68	5.4
Conservative	Katy Sullivan	68	5.4
Labour	Sarah Humphreys	63	5.0
Conservative	Paul Willis	59	4.7
Labour	Tony Clark	56	4.4
Labour	Catherine Power	52	4.1
Turnout		1,265	34.66
Registered electors		3,655	
Rejected ballots		2	0.2
Residents Association hold			
Residents Association hold			
Residents Association hold			

=== Town ===
Town
Party	Candidate	Votes	%
Residents Association	Neil Dallen	795	51.6
Residents Association	Luke Giles	732	47.5
Residents Association	Arthur Abdulin	705	45.7
Liberal Democrats	Alison Kelly	379	24.6
Liberal Democrats	Martin Kimber	289	18.8
Liberal Democrats	Julian Freeman	276	17.9
Labour	Caroline Barretto	257	16.7
Green	David Candlin	244	15.8
Labour	Richard Chinn	206	13.4
Labour	Stuart Gosling	202	13.1
Conservative	Stephen Hackett	151	9.8
Conservative	Graham Rapier	145	9.4
Conservative	Martin Richards	137	8.9
Turnout		1,541	29.35
Registered electors		5,298	
Rejected ballots		14	0.9
Residents Association hold			
Residents Association hold			
Residents Association hold			

=== West Ewell ===
West Ewell
Party	Candidate	Votes	%
Residents Association	Clive Smitheram	1,005	70.7
Residents Association	Monica Coleman	992	69.8
Residents Association	Barry Nash	967	68.0
Labour	Michael Davis	155	10.9
Labour	Daniel Edwards	147	10.3
Labour	Danielle Grufferty	142	9.9
Liberal Democrats	Andrew Casey	132	9.3
Liberal Democrats	Rusmat Ahmed	124	8.7
Conservative	Edward Rutherford	118	8.3
Liberal Democrats	Paul da Silva	112	7.9
Conservative	David Tidd	111	7.8
Conservative	Clifford Woodroffe	96	6.8
Turnout		1,422	30.46
Registered electors		4,692	
Rejected ballots		7	0.5
Residents Association hold			
Residents Association hold			
Residents Association hold			

=== Woodcote ===
Woodcote
Party	Candidate	Votes	%
Residents Association	Elizabeth Frost	1,058	60.7
Residents Association	Steven McCormick	862	49.5
Residents Association	Bernice Froud	858	49.3
Conservative	Christina Mountain	607	34.8
Conservative	Henry Strausser	378	21.7
Conservative	Arran Essex	324	18.6
Liberal Democrats	Julia Goacher	203	11.7
Labour	Abigail Bloom	167	9.6
Liberal Democrats	Emily Martyr	166	9.5
Liberal Democrats	John Payne	155	8.9
Labour	Catherine Carver-Hill	135	7.7
Labour	Dan Condon	127	7.3
Turnout		1,742	39.32
Registered electors		4,453	
Rejected ballots		9	0.5
Residents Association gain from Conservative			
Residents Association hold			
Residents Association hold			

== Changes 2019–2023 ==
- December 2022: Previn Jagutpal (Stamford) resigned. As the vacancy arose within six months of the scheduled 4 May 2023 election, under section 89(3) of the Local Government Act 1972 no by-election was held and the seat remained vacant until that election.

=== By-elections ===
==== Cuddington ====
Cuddington by-election, 23 September 2021
Party	Candidate	Votes	%	±%
Residents Association	Graham Owen Jones	585	56.0	N/A
Labour	Kevin Rhys Davies	207	19.8	N/A
Conservative	Gjergj Bushati	135	12.9	N/A
Liberal Democrats	Daniel William Brown	117	11.2	N/A
Turnout		1,044	23.14	
Registered electors		4,512		
Rejected ballots		0	0.0	
Residents Association hold		Swing		

The by-election was triggered by the death of councillor Robert Foote.

==== West Ewell ====
West Ewell by-election, 7 July 2022
Party	Candidate	Votes	%	±%
Residents Association	Alan Keith Williamson	549	43.4	N/A
Labour Co-op	Mark Christian Todd	395	31.2	N/A
Conservative	Kieran Persand	205	16.2	N/A
Liberal Democrats	Marian Paula Morrison	117	9.2	N/A
Turnout		1,266	26.79	
Registered electors		4,740		
Rejected ballots		4	0.3	
Residents Association hold		Swing		

The by-election was triggered by the death of councillor Clive Smitheram.
