= 2015 Epsom and Ewell Borough Council election =

2015 UK local government election

Results of the 2015 Epsom and Ewell Borough Council election

The 2015 Epsom and Ewell Council election took place on 7 May 2015, to elect members of Epsom and Ewell Council in England. The election was a part of the 2015 United Kingdom local elections and coincided with the general election leading to a higher turnout than when local elections are held in a non-general election year.

== Election result summary ==
All seats become up in this borough for election (known as whole council elections). The election produced an enhanced majority for the long-governing Residents Associations of each part of the borough, which act together in appointing a cabinet, of 24 councillors and an opposition of seven councillors split between two nationally standing party groups. The largest opposition party grouping, the Liberal Democrats were left bereft of the council chamber in line with their heavily losses and loss in share of the vote in the general election.

Epsom and Ewell Borough Council Election, 2015
Party	Seats	Gains	Losses	Net gain/loss	Seats %	Votes %	Votes	+/−
Residents Association	31	6	1	+5	82	46	48,618	-11%
Conservative	4	4	3	+1	11	31	32,351	+10%
Labour	3	0	0	0	8	16	16,879	+5%
Liberal Democrats	0	0	6	-6	0	7	7,393	-6%
Green	0	0	0	0	0	0	360	New
