= 2011 Epsom and Ewell Borough Council election =

2011 UK local government election

Results of the 2011 Epsom and Ewell Borough Council election

Elections to Epsom and Ewell Borough Council were held on Thursday 5 May 2011 in line with other local elections in the United Kingdom. All 38 seats across 13 wards of this Non-metropolitan district were up for election.

== Election result summary ==
Epsom and Ewell Borough Council election, 2011
Party	Seats	Gains	Losses	Net gain/loss	Seats %	Votes %	Votes	+/−
Residents Association	26					53.3%	12,205	
Liberal Democrats	6				15.8	18.0%	4,682	
Conservative	3				7.9	23.3%	6,067	
Labour	3				7.9	12.0%	3,125	

== Ward results ==
The ward results were as follows:

Auriol Ward (2 councillors)
Party	Candidate	Votes	%	±%
Residents Association	John Beckett	740	28	N/A
Residents Association	Christine Long	616	23	−13
Conservative	Christopher Hare	567	21	N/A
Conservative	Millan Surendra Rajasooriar	419	16	N/A
Labour	Catherine Elizabeth Grinyer	102	4	N/A
Liberal Democrats	Richard Nathaniel Dean	83	3	N/A
Labour	Zishaan Mirza	79	3	N/A
Liberal Democrats	Tim Murphy	74	2	N/A
Majority				
Turnout				
Residents Association hold		Swing		
Residents Association hold		Swing		

College Ward (3 councillors)
Party	Candidate	Votes	%	±%
Liberal Democrats	Julie Anne Morris	845		
Liberal Democrats	Anna Clare Jones	819		
Liberal Democrats	Christine Elizabeth Key	792		
Residents Association	Philippa Hutter	769		
Conservative	Fiona Carys Drummond	754		
Conservative	Andy Fay	732		
Residents Association	Bob Charlton	695		
Conservative	Jane Race	684		
Residents Association	Ruth Margaret Sharma	664		
Labour	Becci Chinn	187		
Labour	Ros Lam	185		
Labour	Rob Adnitt	181		
Majority				
Turnout				
Liberal Democrats hold		Swing		
Liberal Democrats hold		Swing		
Liberal Democrats hold		Swing		

Court Ward (3 councillors)
Party	Candidate	Votes	%	±%
Labour	Sheila Anne Carlson	637		
Labour	Rob Geleit	555		
Labour	Dan Stevens	550		
Liberal Democrats	David Colleton Buxton	525		
Liberal Democrats	David Philip Morgan	475		
Liberal Democrats	Charles Leon Wood	416		
Conservative	Ross Adam Butcher	345		
Conservative	James Daniel Petit	345		
Conservative	James Michael Tarbit	296		
Residents Association	Christine Beams	194		
Residents Association	Mary Woodbridge	144		
Residents Association	Christine Howells	134		
Majority				
Turnout				
Labour gain from Liberal Democrats		Swing		
Labour gain from Liberal Democrats		Swing		
Labour gain from Liberal Democrats		Swing		

Cuddington Ward (3 councillors)
Party	Candidate	Votes	%	±%
Residents Association	Judith Glover	1257		
Residents Association	George Crawford	1246		
Residents Association	Robert John Foote	1204		
Conservative	Laura Charlotte Rowan MacPhee	347		
Conservative	James Edward Taylor	329		
Conservative	Rosemary Najim	282		
Labour	Sari Botros	219		
Labour	Clare Lindsay Carlson	208		
Liberal Democrats	John Colin Green	120		
Liberal Democrats	Raj Saini	120		
Majority				
Turnout				
Residents Association hold		Swing		
Residents Association hold		Swing		
Residents Association hold		Swing		

Ewell Ward (3 councillors)
Party	Candidate	Votes	%	±%
Residents Association	Michael Newstead Arthur	1126		
Residents Association	Humphrey Reynolds	1053		
Residents Association	Clive David Woodbridge	1047		
Conservative	Alexander Clarke	338		
Conservative	Philip George Moseley	314		
Conservative	Martin Edward le Jeune	304		
Labour	Helen Lewis	181		
Liberal Democrats	Pat Hall	177		
Labour	Dan Edwards	173		
Liberal Democrats	Janet Johan Foster	159		
Labour	Andy Robinson	153		
Liberal Democrats	Paul Nigel Linscott	115		
Majority				
Turnout				
Residents Association hold		Swing		
Residents Association hold		Swing		
Residents Association hold		Swing		

Ewell Court Ward (3 councillors)
Party	Candidate	Votes	%	±%
Residents Association	Eber Alan Kington	1509		
Residents Association	Jean Smith	1495		
Residents Association	Dave Mayall	1452		
Conservative	Diane Joy Earnshaw	287		
Conservative	Jose Fiuza	224		
Labour	Nitish Bungaroo	150		
Liberal Democrats	Ann Mary Murphy	135		
Majority				
Turnout				
Residents Association hold		Swing		
Residents Association hold		Swing		
Residents Association hold		Swing		

Nonsuch Ward (3 councillors)
Party	Candidate	Votes	%	±%
Residents Association	David Wood	1447		
Residents Association	Chris Frost	1416		
Residents Association	Graham Dudley	1397		
Conservative	Tim Roll Pickering	378		
Conservative	Katy Sullivan	354		
Conservative	Andrew Michael Gordon Sharpe	342		
Liberal Democrats	Steve Dixon	145		
Labour	Alex Godson	130		
Labour	Chris O'Donoghue	129		
Liberal Democrats	John Michael Payne	117		
Liberal Democrats	David John Gourley	97		
Majority				
Turnout				
Residents Association hold		Swing		
Residents Association hold		Swing		
Residents Association hold		Swing		

Ruxley Ward (3 councillors)
Party	Candidate	Votes	%	±%
Residents Association	Jan Mason	795		
Conservative	James Allan Clarke	711		
Conservative	William Patrick Keen	680		
Conservative	Stephen James Pontin	656		
Residents Association	Alan Sursham	609		
Residents Association	Frances Sursham	571		
Labour	Madeline Boissiere	216		
Labour	Glenda Sharman	212		
Liberal Democrats	Julia Rose Kirkland	128		
Liberal Democrats	Mel Lees	125		
Liberal Democrats	Beena Morgan	79		
Majority				
Turnout				
Conservative hold		Swing		
Residents Association hold		Swing		
Conservative gain from Residents Association		Swing		

Stamford Ward (3 councillors)
Party	Candidate	Votes	%	±%
Liberal Democrats	Colin Taylor	905		
Residents Association	Paul Arden-Jones	890		
Liberal Democrats	Nigel Anthony Pavey	878		
Liberal Democrats	Jennifer Rose Horstman	834		
Residents Association	Nina Kaye	813		
Residents Association	Timothy Nathan	768		
Labour	Tony Dix	310		
Labour	Steve Dyke	309		
Labour	Karen Landles	304		
Majority				
Turnout				
Liberal Democrats hold		Swing		
Liberal Democrats hold		Swing		
Residents Association gain from Liberal Democrats		Swing		

Stoneleigh Ward (3 councillors)
Party	Candidate	Votes	%	±%
Residents Association	Mike Teasdale	806		
Residents Association	Pamela Bradley	728		
Conservative	Darren James Dale	727		
Residents Association	Michael Guest	681		
Conservative	Sadiye Karadeniz	558		
Conservative	Islam Uddin Nasir	550		
Labour	Janet Elizabeth Aitkin	223		
Liberal Democrats	Yvonne Marie Dowling	187		
Labour	Olga Lennon-Nitsche	180		
Liberal Democrats	Jim Dapre	177		
Liberal Democrats	Brian William Fisher	144		
Majority				
Turnout				
Residents Association hold		Swing		
Residents Association hold		Swing		
Conservative gain from Residents Association		Swing		

Town Ward (3 councillors)
Party	Candidate	Votes	%	±%
Residents Association	Neil Andrew Dallen	665		
Liberal Democrats	Alison Kelly	616		
Residents Association	Ian Alan Booker	563		
Liberal Democrats	Tony Axelrod	549		
Liberal Democrats	Lesley Neville	517		
Residents Association	Zinar Demeni	480		
Conservative	Andrew Richard Turner Hewlett	397		
Conservative	Roger Hicks	377		
Conservative	Robert Malcolm Sinclair	334		
Labour	Vince Romagnuolo	310		
Labour	Sue Woodcock	301		
Majority				
Turnout				
Residents Association gain from Liberal Democrats		Swing		
Residents Association gain from Liberal Democrats		Swing		
Liberal Democrats hold		Swing		

West Ewell Ward (3 councillors)
Party	Candidate	Votes	%	±%
Residents Association	Clive Smitheram	908		
Residents Association	Jean Lilian Steer	854		
Residents Association	Lucie Dallen	714		
Liberal Democrats	Jonathan Campbell Lees	634		
Liberal Democrats	Andy Reid	510		
Liberal Democrats	Marian Paula Morrison	500		
Conservative	Carole Lilian Edwards	322		
Conservative	Noreen Sullivan	311		
Conservative	Geoffrey Pope	293		
Labour	Andy Carlson	253		
Labour	Gary Anstead	241		
Labour	Lee Cooper	235		
Majority				
Turnout				
Residents Association hold		Swing		
Residents Association hold		Swing		
Residents Association hold		Swing		

Woodcote Ward (3 councillors)
Party	Candidate	Votes	%	±%
Residents Association	Liz Frost	1099		
Residents Association	Ben Cahill-Sawford	998		
Residents Association	Paul Ashley Dallen	985		
Conservative	Sean Sullivan	894		
Conservative	Tina Mountain	890		
Conservative	Alison Jane Chatterton	807		
Labour	Gordon Paterson	201		
Labour	Karen Paterson	189		
Liberal Democrats	Nicole Louise Kelly	182		
Liberal Democrats	Trevor John Barker	179		
Liberal Democrats	Austin Paul Kearney	162		
Majority				
Turnout				
Residents Association hold		Swing		
Residents Association hold		Swing		
Residents Association gain from Conservative		Swing		
