= Epsom Town Hall =

Municipal building in Epsom, Surrey, England

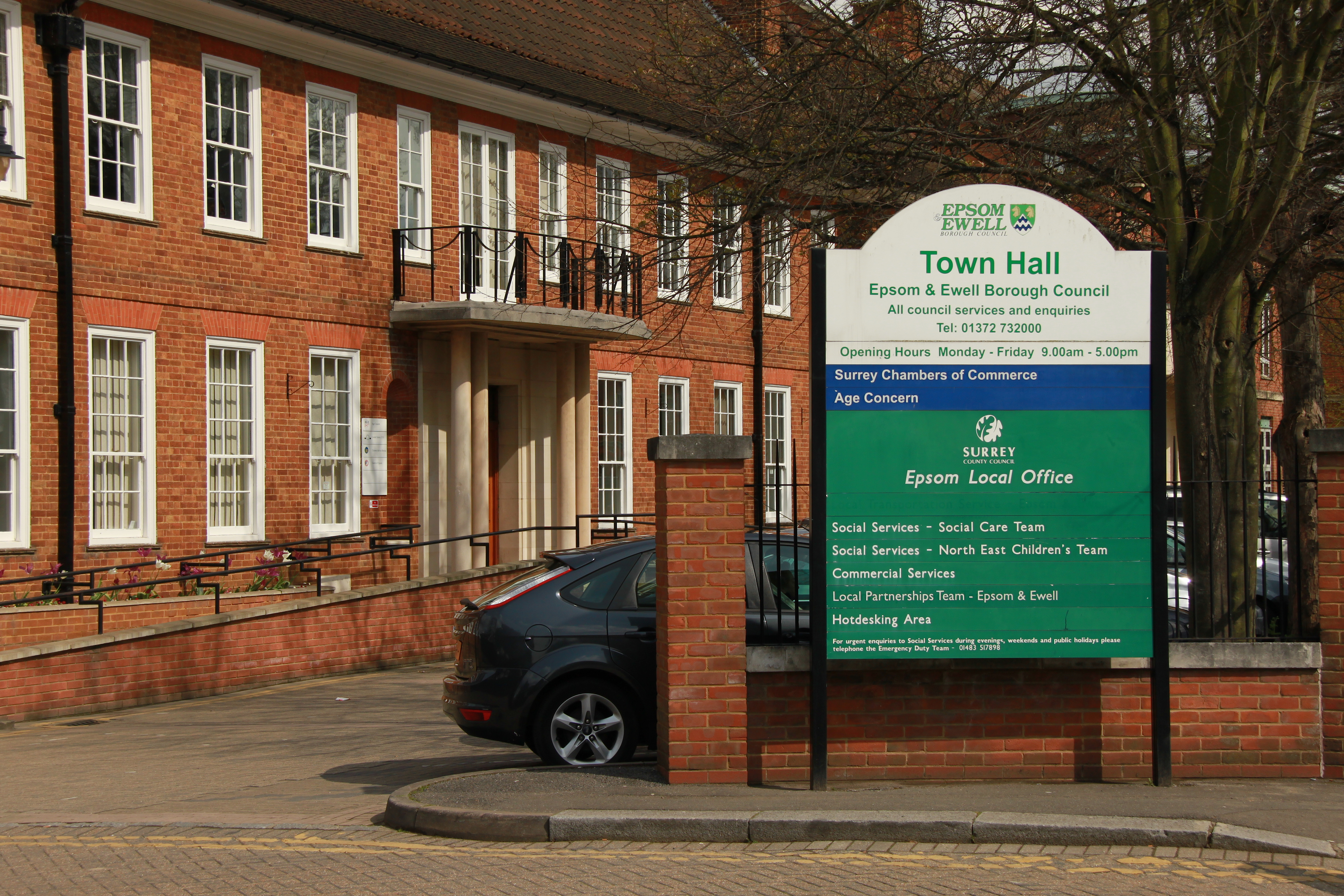
- Epsom Town Hall

- Shown in Surrey
- 51.3329°N 0.2650°W
- Location: The Parade, Epsom

History
- Built: 1934

Site notes
- Architect(s): Hubert Moore Fairweather and William Alfred Pite
- Architectural style: Neo-Georgian style

Epsom Town Hall is a municipal building in The Parade, Epsom, Surrey, England. It is the headquarters of Epsom and Ewell Borough Council.

== History ==
The first town hall in Epsom was a building designed by John Hartchard-Smith in the Italianate style which was completed in 1883; located at the corner of Church Street and Upper High Street, it was built with terracotta facings and featured a prominent Venetian window in the middle of a curved corner frontage. In the early 1930s, civic leaders decided to demolish the old town hall and procure a new building: the site they selected was vacant land on the north side of The Parade. The site had previously been occupied by a domestic residence which was being referred to as "Cromwell House" by the 18th century.

The new building was designed by Hubert Moore Fairweather and William Alfred Pite in the Neo-Georgian style and was officially opened by the former local member of parliament, Lord Ebbisham, on 10 March 1934. The design involved a symmetrical main frontage with seventeen bays facing onto The Parade with the end three bays at each end slightly projected forward; the central bay featured a doorway flanked by two pairs of pillars supporting a balcony with iron railings; there was a French door above the doorway on the first floor and sash windows in all other bays on the ground floor and the first floor. Internally, the principal room in the building was the council chamber.

The building served as the headquarters of Epsom Urban District Council, which was renamed Epsom and Ewell Urban District Council in July 1934, less than four months after the building's opening (Ewell had been absorbed into the urban district in 1933). In 1937 the area became a municipal borough, since when the building has served as the headquarters of Epsom and Ewell Borough Council.

In the early years of the new millennium civic leaders decided to relocate various council departments that had been accommodated around the borough into an expanded town hall facility: a new block was constructed to the east of the main building with a modern atrium and new portico which linked the two blocks: the expanded facility was brought into use in 2003. In a small ceremony at the town hall in June 2019, Station-Sergeant Thomas Green, the victim of the Epsom riot which took place at the end of First World War, was commemorated when his great-grandson, David Kirkham, donated Green's service medals so they could be put on display at the local museum.

Works of art in the town hall include a painting by Hendrick Danckerts depicting Nonsuch Palace and a painting by William Birch depicting Epsom Downs Racecourse.
