= East Surrey Council =

Planned unitary authority in Surrey, England

- Council logo

Type
- Type: Unitary authority of East Surrey

History
- Founded: 1 April 2027
- Preceded by: Surrey County Council

Leadership
- Chair: Nick Dodds, Liberal Democrats since 20 May 2026
- Leader: Steve Wotton, Liberal Democrats since 20 May 2026

Structure
- Political groups: Administration (40) Liberal Democrats (40) Other parties (32) Conservative (10) Green (8) Residents (7) Reform UK (5) Independent (2)
- Length of term: 4 years

Elections
- Voting system: First past the post
- First election: 7 May 2026

Meeting place
- Reigate

Website
- East Surrey Shadow Authority

East Surrey Council is a planned English unitary authority for the local government district of East Surrey.

== Background ==
As part of the Starmer ministry local government reform, a goal of "simpler local government structures" was set out by the government, including a commitment to phase out two-tier local government structures. On 28 October 2025, the government announced its decision for two new authorities to replace Surrey County Council and eleven borough and district councils. East Surrey Council replaces Surrey County Council in the east of the county and Elmbridge Borough Council, Epsom and Ewell Borough Council, Mole Valley District Council, Reigate and Banstead Borough Council and Tandridge District Council.

== Governance ==
The 2026 East Surrey Council election took place on 7 May 2026. The authority will take over local government responsibilities on 1 April 2027, and will operate as a shadow authority before then.

=== Control ===
The inaugural election saw the Liberal Democrats win a majority of the seats on the new authority.

Party in control	Years
Liberal Democrats	2026-present

=== Leadership ===
Political leadership is provided by the leader of the council. Steve Wotton of the Liberal Democrats was formally appointed as leader of the shadow authority at its inaugural meeting in Reigate on 20 May 2026.

Councillor	Party	From	To
Steve Wotton	Liberal Democrats	May 2026	

== See also ==
- West Surrey Council
