= 2023 Epsom and Ewell Borough Council election =

2023 English local election

- 4 May 2023

All 35 seats for Epsom and Ewell Borough Council 18 seats needed for a majority
- Turnout: 48,968

	First party	Second party
Leader	Hannah Dalton	Julie Morris
Party	Residents Association	Liberal Democrats
Seats before	32 (Note: Including one vacant seat previously held by Residents' Association councillor Previn Jagutpal prior to his resignation in December 2022.)	2
Seats won	26	4
Seat change	▼6	▲2
Popular vote	22,152	8,146
	Third party	Fourth party
Leader	Kate Chinn	Bernie Muir
Party	Labour	Conservative
Seats before	3	1
Seats won	3	2
Seat change	Steady	▲1
Popular vote	7,272	9,992
- Map of the results
Leader before election
Hannah Dalton
Residents Association
Leader after election
Hannah Dalton
Residents Association

The 2023 Epsom and Ewell Borough Council election took place on 4 May 2023, to elect all 35 members of Epsom and Ewell Borough Council in Surrey, England. This was on the same day as other local elections across England. New ward boundaries came into effect for this election, reducing the number of seats from 38 to 35.

== Overall results ==
Following the results, the council remained under control of the Residents Associations of Epsom and Ewell.

Epsom & Ewell Borough Council Election
Party	Seats	Gains	Losses	Net gain/loss	Seats %	Votes %	Votes	+/−
Residents Association	26			▼2	74.29	44.0	22,152	
Liberal Democrats	4			▲1	11.43	17.0	8,146	
Labour	3			Steady	8.57	15.0	7,272	
Conservative	2			▲1	5.71	20.0	9,992	
Green	0			Steady	0.0	4.0	1,406	

== Ward results ==
The results for each ward were as follows, with an asterisk (*) indicating an incumbent councillor standing for re-election.

=== Auriol ===
Auriol (2 Seats)
Party	Candidate	Votes	%
Residents Association	John Richard Beckett*	773	74.5
Residents Association	Darren William Talbot	689	66.4
Conservative	Hannah Mireille Jackson Abrahams	138	13.3
Conservative	Caleb Michael Philip Heather	107	10.3
Labour	Julia Karen Lucas	98	9.4
Labour	Garrick Bigwood	94	9.1
Liberal Democrats	Dorothee Katarina Wilbs	56	5.4
Liberal Democrats	Oliver Schuster	52	5.0
Turnout		1,038	30.86
Registered electors		3,389	
Rejected ballots		8	0.8
Residents Association hold			
Residents Association hold			

=== College ===
College (3 Seats)
Party	Candidate	Votes	%
Liberal Democrats	Julie Anne Morris*	1,225	52.8
Liberal Democrats	James John Lawrence	1,142	49.2
Liberal Democrats	Julian Peter Freeman	1,121	48.3
Residents Association	Kate Emily Brooks	573	24.7
Conservative	Christopher Charles Muller	551	23.8
Residents Association	Nigel Kenneth Benno Sippel Coin	508	21.9
Conservative	Michael John Ware	468	20.2
Conservative	Tom Peer	445	19.2
Residents Association	Charlotte Mary Day	421	18.2
Labour	Helen Lewis	327	14.1
Turnout		2,319	46.56
Registered electors		4,994	
Rejected ballots		6	0.3
Liberal Democrats hold			
Liberal Democrats hold			
Liberal Democrats gain from Residents Association			

=== Court ===
Court (3 Seats)
Party	Candidate	Votes	%
Labour	Chris Ames	735	57.8
Labour	Kate Chinn*	692	54.4
Labour	Rob Geleit*	680	53.5
Residents Association	Christine Rosemary Beams	293	23.1
Residents Association	Mary Catherine Sullivan	284	22.3
Residents Association	David Michael Triggs	219	17.2
Conservative	David Erwin Lyndsay	187	14.7
Conservative	Sandy Smyth	187	14.7
Liberal Democrats	Karen Seidel	170	13.4
Conservative	Geoffrey Christopher Pope	165	13.0
Turnout		1,271	27.22
Registered electors		4,691	
Rejected ballots		6	0.5
Labour hold			
Labour hold			
Labour hold			

=== Cuddington ===
Cuddington (3 Seats)
Party	Candidate	Votes	%
Residents Association	Phil Neale*	1,013	67.0
Residents Association	Graham Owen Jones*	960	63.5
Residents Association	Kim Spickett	930	61.5
Labour	Caroline Barretto	238	15.8
Conservative	Garrett Michael Doran	215	14.2
Labour	Kevin Rhys Davies	201	13.3
Conservative	Lynn Walker	201	13.3
Conservative	Alex Paul Hawkes Cole	198	13.1
Liberal Democrats	Dan Brown	182	12.0
Liberal Democrats	Arun Matyjas Saini	108	7.1
Liberal Democrats	Rajesh Saini	96	6.4
Turnout		1,511	30.83
Registered electors		4,924	
Rejected ballots		7	0.5
Residents Association hold			
Residents Association hold			
Residents Association hold			

=== Ewell Court ===
Ewell Court (2 Seats)
Party	Candidate	Votes	%
Residents Association	Peter O'Donovan*	816	70.6
Residents Association	Christopher Robin John Watson	801	69.3
Conservative	Tom Chaloner	150	13.0
Conservative	Oliver Nathaniel Clement	144	12.5
Labour	Dan Edwards	127	11.0
Labour	Debbie Monksfield*	117	10.1
Liberal Democrats	David Walter Gulland*	66	5.7
Liberal Democrats	Tamas Balog	63	5.4
Turnout		1,156	32.58
Registered electors		3,557	
Rejected ballots		3	0.3
Residents Association hold			
Residents Association hold			
Residents Association loss (seat eliminated)			

=== Ewell Village ===
Ewell Village (2 Seats)
Party	Candidate	Votes	%
Residents Association	Christine Gladys Cleveland*	588	57.5
Residents Association	Clive David Woodbridge	565	55.3
Labour	Sandra Noel Hatfield	189	18.5
Green	David Anthony Lee	152	14.9
Conservative	Andrew Nicholas Cook	151	14.8
Liberal Democrats	Kenneth John Kimber	123	12.0
Conservative	Graham Rapier	119	11.6
Liberal Democrats	Andrej Kubicek	95	9.3
Turnout		1,022	31.07
Registered electors		3,322	
Rejected ballots		10	1.0
Residents Association hold			
Residents Association hold			
Residents Association loss (seat eliminated)			

=== Horton ===
Horton (2 Seats)
Party	Candidate	Votes	%
Conservative	Bernie Muir*	737	50.9
Conservative	Kieran Persand	710	49.0
Labour	Ros Godson	357	24.7
Labour	Mark Christian Todd	339	23.4
Residents Association	Eber Alan Kington*	258	17.8
Residents Association	Henal Vinod Ladwa	191	13.2
Liberal Democrats	Philip McLauchlan	130	9.0
Liberal Democrats	Paul Stephen Vagg	126	8.7
Turnout		1,448	43.99
Registered electors		3,301	
Rejected ballots		4	0.3
Conservative win (new seat)			
Conservative win (new seat)			

=== Nonsuch ===
Nonsuch (3 Seats)
Party	Candidate	Votes	%
Residents Association	Christine Anne Howells*	962	54.8
Residents Association	Robert Leach	875	49.8
Residents Association	Shanice Goldman	829	47.2
Conservative	Ajay Kumar Uppal	411	23.4
Conservative	Steven Liu	391	22.3
Conservative	Jamie Abrahams	379	21.6
Green	Janice Baker	356	20.3
Labour	Gaye Hadfield	198	11.3
Liberal Democrats	Sharon Marie Stead	183	10.4
Labour	Ian Leslie Ward	174	9.9
Liberal Democrats	Stephen William Dixon	170	9.7
Liberal Democrats	Gary Derek Peters	132	7.5
Turnout		1,757	33.68
Registered electors		5,229	
Rejected ballots		4	0.2
Residents Association hold			
Residents Association hold			
Residents Association hold			

=== Ruxley ===
Ruxley (2 Seats)
Party	Candidate	Votes	%
Residents Association	Alex Coley*	396	48.4
Residents Association	Jan Mason*	394	48.1
Labour	Rob Adnitt	172	21.0
Labour	Catherine Anne Carver-Hill	166	20.3
Conservative	David Raymond John Collins	144	17.6
Conservative	Joseph Ojo Alawo	131	16.0
Green	David Michael Kidd	85	10.4
Liberal Democrats	Marian Paula Morrison	64	7.8
Turnout		819	22.63
Registered electors		3,641	
Rejected ballots		5	0.6
Residents Association hold			
Residents Association hold			
Residents Association loss (seat eliminated)			

=== Stamford ===
Stamford (2 Seats)
Party	Candidate	Votes	%
Liberal Democrats	Alison Kelly	439	28.0
Residents Association	Steve Bridger*	431	27.5
Liberal Democrats	David Colleton Buxton	395	25.2
Residents Association	Martin Olney	389	24.8
Conservative	Stephen Pontin	355	22.7
Conservative	Aaron Persand	329	21.0
Green	Andrew Darren Bailey	283	18.1
Labour	Karen Landles	251	16.0
Labour	Richard William Chinn	190	12.1
Turnout		1,567	42.61
Registered electors		3,692	
Rejected ballots		6	0.4
Liberal Democrats gain from Residents Association			
Residents Association gain from Conservative			
Residents Association loss (seat eliminated)			

=== Stoneleigh ===
Stoneleigh (2 Seats)
Party	Candidate	Votes	%
Residents Association	Hannah Charlotte Emily Dalton*	853	74.3
Residents Association	Anthony John Froud	720	62.7
Conservative	Charlotte Ann Angus	178	15.5
Conservative	Tracy Margaret Muller	131	11.4
Labour	Sue Hoyle	120	10.5
Labour	Ragu Raymond	83	7.2
Liberal Democrats	Brian William Fisher	75	6.5
Liberal Democrats	Rusmat Roland Arthur Ahmed	68	5.9
Turnout		1,148	32.06
Registered electors		3,590	
Rejected ballots		3	0.3
Residents Association hold			
Residents Association hold			
Residents Association loss (seat eliminated)			

=== Town ===
Town (3 Seats)
Party	Candidate	Votes	%
Residents Association	Neil Andrew Dallen*	622	41.1
Residents Association	Rachel Sarah King	568	37.5
Residents Association	Arthur Abdulin*	556	36.7
Labour	John Stuart Gosling	504	33.3
Labour	Sarah Louise Kenyon	501	33.1
Green	Yvonne Caroline Grunwald	258	17.0
Liberal Democrats	Gillian Miles	240	15.8
Conservative	Danny Leonard Fullilove	213	14.1
Conservative	Jamie Joseph O'Sullivan	204	13.5
Liberal Democrats	Sarah Louise Charlotte Whitworth	202	13.3
Liberal Democrats	Philip Victor Pavey	182	12.0
Conservative	Meera Persand	173	11.4
Turnout		1,515	28.85
Registered electors		5,265	
Rejected ballots		4	0.3
Residents Association hold			
Residents Association hold			
Residents Association hold			

=== West Ewell ===
West Ewell (3 Seats)
Party	Candidate	Votes	%
Residents Association	Lucie Kimberley McIntyre*	682	44.1
Residents Association	Alan Keith Williamson*	629	40.7
Residents Association	Humphrey Reynolds*	586	37.9
Labour	Jason George Anderson	417	27.0
Conservative	Patrick Christopher Campion	367	23.8
Conservative	Kitty O'Sullivan	285	18.4
Green	Tony Foster	272	17.6
Liberal Democrats	Andrew John Casey	264	17.1
Liberal Democrats	Linda Martha Chmiel	259	16.8
Conservative	Nafiz Huq	240	15.5
Liberal Democrats	Lisa Zahra Haghir	194	12.6
Turnout		1,545	31.53
Registered electors		4,909	
Rejected ballots		3	0.2
Residents Association hold			
Residents Association hold			
Residents Association hold			

=== Woodcote and Langley Vale ===
Woodcote and Langley Vale (3 Seats)
Party	Candidate	Votes	%
Residents Association	Liz Frost*	891	53.2
Residents Association	Steven John McCormick*	796	47.5
Residents Association	Bernice Froud*	737	44.0
Conservative	Emma Charlotte Ware	369	22.0
Conservative	Fiona Peer	352	21.0
Conservative	Henry Strausser	338	20.2
Green	Jonathan Neil Parkinson	319	19.0
Labour	Abbey Bloom	272	16.2
Liberal Democrats	Emily Lucia Cottam Martyr	225	13.4
Liberal Democrats	Daniel Charles Martyr	185	11.0
Liberal Democrats	John Michael Payne	176	10.5
Labour	Mike Westbrook	174	10.4
Turnout		1,676	37.81
Registered electors		4,449	
Rejected ballots		6	0.4
Residents Association hold			
Residents Association hold			
Residents Association hold			

== Changes 2023–2027 ==
- February 2025: Alex Coley (Ruxley) left the Residents Associations of Epsom and Ewell to sit as an Independent, citing unresolved concerns about the council's financial position.
- March 2025: Julie Morris (College), the Liberal Democrat group leader, stepped down and left the party to sit as an Independent; James Lawrence succeeded her as Liberal Democrat group leader.
- By March 2026: Christine Howells (Nonsuch) had also left the Residents Associations of Epsom and Ewell to join the Independent group alongside Coley and Morris.
- January 2026: Shanice Goldman (Nonsuch) left the Residents Associations of Epsom and Ewell to join the Conservatives, citing concerns over governance, the council's Local Plan and its approach to parish councils.
- 10 February 2026: Chris Watson (Ewell Court) left the Residents Associations of Epsom and Ewell to join the Labour Party.
- 19 March 2026: James Lawrence (College) resigned as Liberal Democrat group leader and left the party to join the Independent group, criticising the national leadership under Ed Davey and expressing regret at having helped elect the local Liberal Democrat MP.
- By May 2026: Steven McCormick (Woodcote and Langley Vale) left the Residents Associations of Epsom and Ewell to join the Conservatives.
- Epsom and Ewell Borough Council is due to be abolished on 1 April 2027, when its functions transfer to the new East Surrey Council unitary authority; elections for the shadow East Surrey Council were held on 7 May 2026.
