= Blenheim High School =

Coordinates: 51.345°N 0.264°W

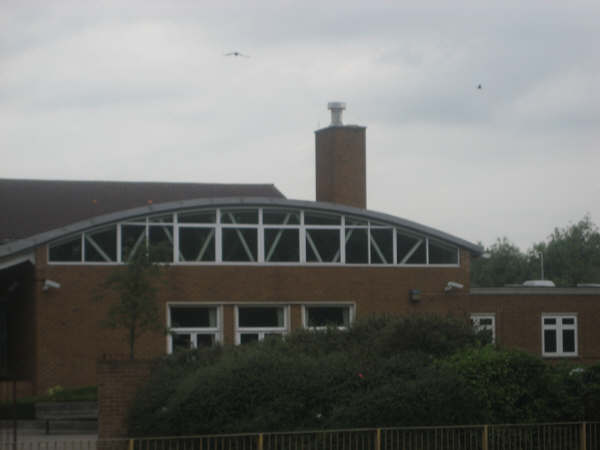

Location
- Longmead Road; Epsom, Surrey, KT19 9BH; England

Information
- Type: Academy
- Motto: Believe and achieve
- Established: 1997
- Local authority: Surrey
- Department for Education URN: 137906 Tables
- Ofsted: Reports
- Chair: Kate Herbert
- Head teacher: Anthony Bodell
- Staff: 163, including 3 Deputy Heads and 10 Assistant Heads
- Gender: Mixed
- Age: 11 to 18
- Enrolment: 1,350 pupils
- Houses: • Tulyar • Nashwan • Octavius • Sinndar
- Colour: Burgundy
- Website: blenheim.surrey.sch.uk

Blenheim High School is a secondary school located at Longmead Road, Epsom, Surrey, England, that opened in 1997. It is a coeducational, publicly funded academy that educates children from ages 11–18, with 1,350 pupils on roll.

== Academic standards ==
In the Ofsted inspection carried out in November 2024, the school was rated as "Good", point two on the four-point scale (one being the highest).

In the Ofsted inspection carried out in May 2019, the school was rated as "Good", point two on the four-point scale (one being the highest).

In the Ofsted inspection carried out in January 2017, the school was rated as "Requires Improvement," point three on the four-point scale (one being the highest).

In the Ofsted inspection carried out in summer 2013 the school was rated as "Good," point two on the four-point scale (one being the highest).

In the Ofsted inspection carried out in February 2010 the school was rated as "Satisfactory," point three on the four-point scale (one being the highest).

In the previous, February 2007, Ofsted inspection the school was rated "Good," point two on the scale, and described as "a good school with many outstanding features." The school had been rated "Outstanding" in relation to the questions:

- How good is the overall personal development and well-being of the learners?
- How effective are leadership and management in raising achievement and supporting all learners?

Ofsted described Blenheim as "calm, orderly and purposeful".

== Admission arrangements ==
The school was oversubscribed in 2020 and prior to 2011.

On 5 October 2001 the admission arrangements were reviewed by an independent adjudicator who decided:

- The school should not name priority wards because this would discriminate in favour of children from the Borough of Epsom and Ewell, to the disadvantage of those who live in the London Borough of Sutton.
- The priority given to children of governors or staff should be removed.

== Parliamentary mentions ==
On 26 October 2001 Stephen Timms, then Minister of State for School Standards, in a written answer, gave an assurance to Chris Grayling MP that the funding of the school would be safeguarded despite the ending of grant-maintained status.

== Awards ==
- Rolls-Royce Science Prize (Special Merit Award Winner 2007)
