= 2023 Tandridge District Council election =

2023 English local election

← 2022	4 May 2023	2024 →

14 of 42 seats on Tandridge District Council 22 seats needed for a majority

	First party	Second party
Leader		Jeffrey Gray
Party	Independent	Liberal Democrats
Last election	4 seats, 21.0%	3 seats, 17.4%
Seats before	13 (Note: Includes one vacant seat in Lingfield & Crowhurst ward previously held by independent councillor Liz Lockwood prior to her resignation in January 2023. Three of the independent councillors formed the "Independent Group" led by Martin Allen, the rest (including the vacant seat) formed part of the "Residents' Alliance" group with the Oxted and Limpsfield Residents Group.)	11 (Note: Including one vacant seat in Portley ward previously held by Liberal Democrat councillor Kerry Mansfield prior to her resignation in February 2023.)
Seats won	6	3
Seats after	14	11
	Third party	Fourth party
Leader	Robin Bloore	Catherine Sayer
Party	Conservative	OLRG
Last election	4 seats, 29.8%	3 seats, 20.7%
Seats before	10	8
Seats won	2	3
Seats after	9	8
- Independents in grey, Liberal Democrats in yellow, Oxted & Limpsfield Residents in green and Conservatives in blue. Wards in white were not contested in 2023.
Leader before election
Catherine Sayer
OLRG
No overall control
Leader after election
Catherine Sayer
OLRG
No overall control

The 2023 Tandridge District Council election took place on 4 May 2023 to elect 14 members (one-third) of Tandridge District Council in Surrey, England. This was on the same day as other local elections across England.

The council remained under no overall control, being led by an alliance of local party the Oxted and Limpsfield Residents Group and some of the independent councillors.

== Results summary ==
Following the results the council remained under no overall control.

Party	Seats won	Change	Seats overall
Independent	6	▲2	14
Liberal Democrats	3	Steady	11
Conservative	2	▼2	9
Oxted and Limpsfield Residents Group	3	Steady	8

Seat change compared to last time these seats were elected together in 2019.

== Ward results ==
The results for each ward were as follows, with an asterisk indicating a sitting councillor standing for re-election.

=== Bletchingley and Nutfield ===
Bletchingley and Nutfield
Party	Candidate	Votes	%	±%
Independent	Helena Windsor	594	38.0	+14.3
Liberal Democrats	Richard Fowler	407	26.0	+3.8
Conservative	Mark Winsbury	368	23.5	−21.1
Labour	Linda Baharier	195	12.5	+3.0
Majority				
Turnout		1,564	35.5	
Independent gain from Conservative		Swing		

=== Burstow, Horne and Outwood ===
Burstow, Horne and Outwood
Party	Candidate	Votes	%	±%
Independent	Richard Smith	724	51.8	+9.9
Conservative	Theo Harris	338	24.2	−12.3
Labour	Stephen Case-Green	179	12.8	+7.5
Green	Michael Presland	89	6.4	−1.6
Liberal Democrats	Sam Howson	69	4.9	−3.4
Majority				
Turnout		1,399	28.8	
Independent hold		Swing		

=== Chaldon ===
Chaldon
Party	Candidate	Votes	%	±%
Conservative	Lewis Sharp	386	66.2	−2.9
Liberal Democrats	Neil Parker	133	22.8	+4.0
Green	Rachel Starling	43	7.4	N/A
Labour	Nicole Morrigan	21	3.6	+0.8
Majority				
Turnout		583	41.1	
Conservative hold		Swing		

=== Dormansland and Felcourt ===
Dormansland and Felcourt
Party	Candidate	Votes	%	±%
Independent	Nicola O'Riordan	456	41.5	−1.5
Conservative	Harry Fitzgerald	421	38.4	−7.2
Liberal Democrats	Roger Martin	143	13.0	+1.7
Labour	Caz Lessey	76	6.9	N/A
Majority				
Turnout		1,096	36.4	
Independent gain from Conservative		Swing		

=== Felbridge ===
Felbridge
Party	Candidate	Votes	%	±%
Independent	Judy Moore*	247	39.5	+16.2
Conservative	Patrick Jolliffe	219	35.0	−30.0
Green	Rebecca Peterson	93	14.9	+3.2
Labour	Emba Jones	66	10.6	N/A
Majority				
Turnout		625	35.3	
Independent gain from Conservative		Swing		

Shown as independent gain from Conservative to allow for comparison with the last time this set of seats was contested together in 2019, but Judy Moore was the incumbent councillor having won the seat in a by-election in 2021.

=== Godstone ===
Godstone
Party	Candidate	Votes	%	±%
Independent	Colin White*	859	62.9	−10.2
Conservative	Keith Ward	242	17.7	+3.3
Labour	Paul Ryan	159	11.6	+7.6
Liberal Democrats	Martin Redman	106	7.8	+3.3
Majority				
Turnout		1,366	30.9	
Independent hold		Swing		

Colin White was councillor for Burstow, Horne and Outwood ward prior to the election.

=== Limpsfield ===
Limpsfield
Party	Candidate	Votes	%	±%
OLRG	Claire Blackwell*	944	75.9	+5.5
Conservative	Paul Greenhalgh	166	13.3	−10.3
Liberal Democrats	Rupert McCann	74	5.9	−0.1
Labour	Mark Dean	60	4.8	N/A
Majority				
Turnout		1,244	44.0	
OLRG hold		Swing		

=== Lingfield and Crowhurst ===
Lingfield and Crowhurst
Party	Candidate	Votes	%	±%
Conservative	Lesley Steeds*	477	38.3	+13.4
Independent	Charlotte Swann*	473	38.0	−28.2
Labour	Ryan Howard	182	14.6	N/A
Liberal Democrats	Dave Wilkes	113	9.1	+0.2
Majority				
Turnout		1,245	38.0	
Conservative gain from Independent		Swing		

Lesley Steeds was councillor for Dormansland and Felcourt ward prior to the election. Charlotte Swann was councillor for Godstone prior to the election.

=== Oxted North and Tandridge ===
Oxted North and Tandridge
Party	Candidate	Votes	%	±%
OLRG	Peter Damesick	1,371	74.8	+7.0
Conservative	Michael Casebourne	221	12.1	−12.6
Labour	Louis Labrosse	128	7.0	+4.3
Liberal Democrats	Martin Caxton	98	5.3	+0.5
Heritage	Christopher Dean	15	0.8	N/A
Majority				
Turnout		1,833	40.4	
OLRG hold		Swing		

=== Oxted South ===
Oxted South
Party	Candidate	Votes	%	±%
OLRG	Chris Langton*	1,099	64.9	+1.6
Conservative	Nicolas Cook	209	12.3	−4.2
Labour	David Halliwell	195	11.5	+4.5
Green	Olivia Grierson	115	6.8	N/A
Liberal Democrats	Robert Wingate	75	4.4	−1.5
Majority				
Turnout		1,693	36.1	
OLRG hold		Swing		

=== Portley ===
Portley
Party	Candidate	Votes	%	±%
Liberal Democrats	Anna Jones	553	59.0	+3.1
Conservative	Richard Mark	253	27.0	+1.1
Labour	Roy Stewart	131	14.0	−7.0
Majority				
Turnout		937	27.5	
Liberal Democrats hold		Swing		

=== Tatsfield and Titsey ===
Tatsfield and Titsey
Party	Candidate	Votes	%	±%
Independent	Martin Allen*	371	68.3	+10.3
Conservative	Harry Millar	124	22.8	−1.4
Labour	Nathan Manning	48	8.8	+2.6
Majority				
Turnout		543	35.5	
Independent hold		Swing		

=== Valley ===
Valley
Party	Candidate	Votes	%	±%
Liberal Democrats	Alun Jones*	684	73.9	+11.4
Conservative	Clare Sailing	158	17.1	−0.2
Labour	Anne Watson	83	9.0	−0.6
Majority				
Turnout		925	28.7	
Liberal Democrats hold		Swing		

=== Warlingham East, Chelsham and Farleigh ===
Warlingham East, Chelsham and Farleigh
Party	Candidate	Votes	%	±%
Liberal Democrats	Anna Patel	643	46.2	−8.8
Conservative	Nathan Adams	456	32.8	+5.1
Independent	Martin Haley	147	10.6	−1.6
Labour	Daniel Mann	85	6.1	+1.1
Green	Jessica Hibberd	61	4.4	N/A
Majority				
Turnout		1,392	32.5	
Liberal Democrats hold		Swing		
