= 2026 East Surrey Council election =

2026 English local government election

- 7 May 2026

All 72 seats to East Surrey Council 37 seats needed for a majority
- Registered: 406,177
- Turnout: 199,485; 49.1%

	First party	Second party	Third party
Party	Liberal Democrats	Residents	Conservative
Seats before	75 (Note: Total number of district, borough, and county seats held across the five East Surrey predecessor authorities and the portion of Surrey County Council covering the East Surrey area.)	60 (Note: List of residents associations/groups: 30 Epsom & Ewell Residents Association 9 Oxted & Limpsfield Residents Group 5 Thames Ditton/Weston Green Residents Association 4 Nork Residents Association 4 The Moseley Residents Association 3 Tattenham & Preston Residents 3 Esher Residents Association 2 Hinchley Wood Residents Association)	54
Seats won	40	7	10
Seats after	40	7	10
Seat change	▼35	▼53	▼44
Percentage	29.4%	9.4%	22.3%
	Fourth party	Fifth party	Sixth party
Party	Independent	Green	Labour
Seats before	34	16	3
Seats won	2	8	0
Seats after	2	8	0
Seat change	▼32	▼8	▼3
Percentage	2.7%	11.3%	3.4%
	Seventh party
Party	Reform
Seats before	2
Seats won	5
Seats after	5
Seat change	▲3
Percentage	21.5%
- Map showing the wards that were contested at the 2026 East Surrey Council election.

- Composition of the council following the election. Liberal Democrats: 40 seats Conservative Party: 10 seats Green Party of England and Wales: 8 seats Residents' Association: 7 seats Reform UK: 5 seats Independent: 2 seats
Leader after election
Steve Wotton
Liberal Democrats

The 2026 East Surrey Council election was an election that took place on 7 May 2026 to elect members of East Surrey Council in Surrey, England.

This was the inaugural election to East Surrey Council, ahead of its formal creation from the merger of Elmbridge, Epsom & Ewell, Mole Valley, Reigate & Banstead, and Tandridge, along with the abolition of Surrey County Council. The council will initially operate as a "shadow authority", with the transition to the council's full powers expected on 1st April 2027.

72 seats from 36 wards were contested at the election, a sharp reduction in the number of councillors covering the East Surrey area (246 pre-reorganisation (Note: District, borough, and county councillors.) vs. 72 post-reorganisation, a reduction of 71%). The ward boundaries used were a modified set of boundaries derived from the Surrey County Council division boundaries covering the East Surrey Council area and last used in the 2021 Surrey County Council election.

The Liberal Democrats won a majority at this election, taking 40 of the 72 seats. After the election, they chose Steve Wotton to be their group leader. He was formally confirmed as leader of the shadow authority at its inaugural meeting at Reigate on 20 May 2026.

== Comparison with SCC results of 2021 ==
At the Surrey County Council elections of 2021, the results in the 36 divisions within the East Surrey area were as follows:

The Conservative Party won 22 divisions, with 22 councillors duly elected. Residents’ Parties and candidates won 7 divisions. The Liberal Democrats won 3 divisions. The Greens won 2 divisions, and Independent candidates also won in 2 divisions. No Labour Party or Reform Party candidates were elected, with Reform contesting only a minimal number of seats in Surrey (and across England) in the local elections of 2021.

With two councillors to be elected in each of the 36 wards of East Surrey in 2026 (and with those 36 wards being very similar to the 36 Surrey County Council divisions contested in 2021), one can summarise that the notional 2021-based ‘seats before’ starting point for each of the political parties prior to the 2026 East Surrey election was as follows:

Conservatives 44 seats (ie. double their haul of 22 wins in 2021, owing to two councillors per ward being elected in 2026, rather than just one as in 2021); Residents’ parties and candidates 14 seats; the Liberal Democrats 6 seats; the Greens 4 seats; and Independents 4 seats.

By this calculation, the Liberal Democrats increased their number of councillors in East Surrey in 2026 by 34, going from 6 notional seats in 2021 to 40 seats in 2026. The Conservatives saw a net reduction of 34, winning just 10 seats compared to their previous total of 44. The Greens doubled their number of seats, going from 4 in 2021 to 8 in 2026, whilst the number of Residents’ seats was halved, going down from 14 to 7. The Reform Party secured 5 seats in 2026, an increase of 5, and Independents saw their representation halved, from 4 seats to 2. The Labour Party failed to secure any seats in East Surrey in either 2021 or 2026.

== Opinion polling ==
Pollster	Date(s) conducted	Sample size	Con	Lab	Lib Dem	Green	Reform	Ind/Other	Lead
JL Partners (MRP)	April 2026	TBA	25%	7%	29%	9%	27%	4%	2

== Election results ==
2026 East Surrey Council election
Party	Candidates	Seats	Gains	Losses	Net gain/loss	Seats %	Votes %	Votes	+/−
Liberal Democrats	71	40	0	0	+34	55.6	29.4	113,582	N/A
Conservative	72	10	0	0	-34	13.9	22.3	86,378	N/A
Green	68	8	0	0	+4	11.1	11.3	43,725	N/A
Reform	72	5	0	0	+5	6.9	21.5	82,987	N/A
Residents Association	10	2	0	0	Steady	2.8	3.4	13,156	N/A
Independent	9	2	0	0	Steady	2.8	2.7	10,482	N/A
Ashtead Independents	2	2	0	0	Steady	2.8	1.5	5,771	N/A
Nork and Tattenhams Residents' Associations	2	2	0	0	Steady	2.8	1.4	5,449	N/A
The Molesey Residents Association	2	1	0	0	Steady	1.4	0.7	2,708	N/A
Labour	61	0	0	0	0	0.0	3.4	13,095	N/A
Hinchley Wood Residents	2	0	0	0	Steady	0.0	1.0	3,970	N/A
Thames Ditton Residents' Association	1	0	0	0	Steady	0.0	0.4	1,676	N/A
The Walton Society	2	0	0	0	Steady	0.0	0.4	1,507	N/A
Ind. Network	1	0	0	0	Steady	0.0	0.3	1,181	N/A
Weybridge Independents	1	0	0	0	Steady	0.0	0.3	1,003	N/A
SDP	2	0	0	0	Steady	0.0	0.0	78	N/A
Heritage	1	0	0	0	Steady	0.0	0.0	42	N/A

== Results by ward ==
=== Elmbridge ===
Cobham & Oxshott South (2 seats)
Party	Candidate	Votes	%
Conservative	David Lewis	2,855	50.5
Conservative	Alan Parker	2,469	43.7
Liberal Democrats	Paul Aubrey	1,520	26.9
Liberal Democrats	Linda Idrizi	1,443	25.5
Reform	Elaine Kingston	1,101	19.5
Reform	Nicholas Wood	1,021	18.1
Green	Winter Bono	369	6.5
Labour	Carolyn Gray	166	2.9
Labour	Steven Gray	110	1.9
Registered electors		12,473	
Turnout		5,651	100.0
Rejected ballots		7	0.1
Conservative win (new seat)			
Conservative win (new seat)			

Esher, Claygate & Oxshott North (2 seats)
Party	Candidate	Votes	%
Liberal Democrats	Alex Coomes	2,390	40.1
Liberal Democrats	Andrew Burton	2,241	37.6
Conservative	Andrew Burley	1,954	32.8
Conservative	Amanda Manship	1,665	27.9
Independent	Simon Waugh	977	16.4
Reform	Geoff Herbert	899	15.1
Reform	Art Salihu	631	10.6
Green	Sarah Coomes	392	6.6
Green	Ian Cunningham	271	4.5
Labour	Julie Crook	96	1.6
SDP	Lawrence Riley	36	0.6
Registered electors		10,038	
Turnout		5,960	100.0
Rejected ballots		11	0.2
Liberal Democrats win (new seat)			
Liberal Democrats win (new seat)			

Hersham (2 seats)
Party	Candidate	Votes	%
Liberal Democrats	Wendy Gibbs	2,252	39.9
Conservative	John Cope	1,952	34.6
Liberal Democrats	Alistair Price	1,946	34.5
Conservative	Corinne Sterry	1,407	24.9
Reform	Harrison Allman-Varty	1,138	20.2
Reform	Carlos de Pommes	969	17.2
Green	Helen Brown	425	7.5
Independent	Simon Leifer	392	7.0
Green	Laura Murria	305	5.4
Labour	Francis Eldergill	150	2.7
Registered electors		11,049	
Turnout		5,640	100.0
Rejected ballots		8	0.1
Liberal Democrats win (new seat)			
Conservative win (new seat)			

Long Ditton, Hinchley Wood & Weston Green (2 seats)
Party	Candidate	Votes	%
Liberal Democrats	Fran Fish	2,651	42.4
Liberal Democrats	Neil Houston	2,431	38.9
Hinchley Wood Residents	Simon Crome	2,103	33.7
Hinchley Wood Residents	Scott Dodkins	1,867	29.9
Reform	David Hall	658	10.5
Conservative	Caroline Kim	631	10.1
Reform	Jim Torpey	588	9.4
Conservative	James Nicholas	536	8.6
Green	Lorna Hayes	379	6.1
Green	Dalia Wickenden	282	4.5
Labour	Nick Davies	115	1.8
Labour	Rachelle Headland	93	1.5
Registered electors		11,971	
Turnout		6,248	100.0
Rejected ballots		2	0.0
Liberal Democrats win (new seat)			
Liberal Democrats win (new seat)			

Thames Ditton & East Molesey (2 seats)
Party	Candidate	Votes	%
Liberal Democrats	Sue Fergy	2,108	40.4
Liberal Democrats	Vicky Zadeh	1,865	35.7
Thames Ditton Residents' Association	Sam Brierley	1,676	32.1
The Molesey Residents Association	Kevin Whincup	1,298	24.9
Conservative	Charlotte Keywood	792	15.2
Conservative	Redmond Walsh	570	10.9
Reform	Colin Greff	544	10.4
Reform	Paul Simmons	506	9.7
Green	Leah Thomas	352	6.7
Green	James Price	289	5.5
Labour	Richard Lewis	137	2.6
Labour	Harry McKay	77	1.5
Registered electors		10,038	
Turnout		5,223	100.0
Rejected ballots		6	0.1
Liberal Democrats win (new seat)			
Liberal Democrats win (new seat)			

Walton (2 seats)
Party	Candidate	Votes	%
Liberal Democrats	Nick Dodds	2,315	42.5
Liberal Democrats	Joshua Lambert	1,864	34.2
Independent	Gregor MacGregor	1,235	22.7
Reform	Wendy Hobbs	1,218	22.4
Reform	Gill Tovey	1,120	20.6
The Walton Society	Barry Cheyne	1,075	19.7
Conservative	Lloyd Soldatt	562	10.3
Green	Eddie Moriarty	415	7.6
Conservative	Rahul Verma	373	6.8
Green	Kyle Napp	254	4.7
Labour	Callum Dyer	181	3.3
Registered electors		12,068	
Turnout		5,449	100.0
Rejected ballots		13	0.2
Liberal Democrats win (new seat)			
Liberal Democrats win (new seat)			

Walton South & Oatlands (2 seats)
Party	Candidate	Votes	%
Liberal Democrats	Kirsty Hewens	2,712	46.8
Liberal Democrats	Ashley Tilling	2,317	40.0
Conservative	Ann Meehan	1,606	27.7
Conservative	Dan Smith	1,536	26.5
Reform	Candida Brook	1,032	17.8
Reform	Joe Torreson	877	15.1
Green	Karen Hohler	474	8.2
The Walton Society	Andrew Kelly	432	7.5
Labour	Susan Cope	162	2.8
Labour	Anthony Charlesworth	131	2.3
Registered electors		11,787	
Turnout		5,792	100.0
Rejected ballots		6	0.1
Liberal Democrats win (new seat)			
Liberal Democrats win (new seat)			

West Molesey (2 seats)
Party	Candidate	Votes	%
Conservative	Steve Bax	2,248	44.2
The Molesey Residents Association	Ernest Mallett	1,410	27.7
Conservative	Sunny Cadman	1,262	24.8
Liberal Democrats	James Kemp	1,148	22.6
Reform	Stephen Brown	987	19.4
Liberal Democrats	Philip Smith-Stevenson	906	17.8
Reform	Larisa Marcu	696	13.7
Green	Andrew Dillon	592	11.6
Green	Joel Prujean-Skupski	324	6.4
Labour	Susan Dennis	247	4.9
Registered electors		10,365	
Turnout		5,083	100.0
Rejected ballots		2	0.0
Conservative win (new seat)			
Residents win (new seat)			

Weybridge (2 seats)
Party	Candidate	Votes	%
Liberal Democrats	Pippa Graeme	2,334	40.7
Liberal Democrats	Eva Ferlez	2,001	34.9
Conservative	Hilary Butler	1,598	27.8
Conservative	Alistair Mann	1,169	20.4
Reform	Colin McFarlane	1,027	17.9
Weybridge Independents	Peter Harman	1,003	17.5
Reform	Moira Gill	989	17.2
Green	Sandra Bartelik	363	6.3
Green	Brittany Johansson	335	5.8
Labour	Gary Dean	141	2.5
Labour Co-op	Helen Pilmer	116	2.0
Registered electors		12,337	
Turnout		5,740	100.0
Rejected ballots		8	0.1
Liberal Democrats win (new seat)			
Liberal Democrats win (new seat)			

=== Epsom and Ewell ===
Epsom Town & Downs (2 seats)
Party	Candidate	Votes	%
Liberal Democrats	Melissa Baynes	2,769	45.0
Liberal Democrats	Roy Deadman	2,475	40.2
Residents Association	Steven McCormick	1,503	24.4
Residents Association	Kim Spickett	1,146	18.6
Reform	Henry Strausser	825	13.4
Reform	Adrian Daniels	817	13.3
Conservative	Aaron Persand	632	10.3
Conservative	Michael Ware	607	9.9
Green	Gregory Smith	389	6.3
Green	Sally Stewart	383	6.2
Labour	Kate Chinn	277	4.5
Labour	Stuart Gosling	192	3.1
Registered electors		12,007	
Turnout		6,154	100.0
Rejected ballots		11	0.2
Liberal Democrats win (new seat)			
Liberal Democrats win (new seat)			

Epsom West (2 seats)
Party	Candidate	Votes	%
Liberal Democrats	David Buxton	2,538	42.3
Liberal Democrats	John Hindmarsh	2,538	42.3
Reform	David Bearryman	989	16.5
Conservative	Kieran Persand	959	16.0
Conservative	Stephen Pontin	953	15.9
Reform	Ben Cronin	916	15.3
Residents Association	Scott Marshall	710	11.8
Residents Association	Christine Cleveland	702	11.7
Green	Yvonne Grunwald	683	11.4
Green	Jonathan Parkinson	548	9.1
Labour	Ros Godson	246	4.1
Labour	Keew Ng	210	3.5
Registered electors		12,058	
Turnout		5,997	100.0
Rejected ballots		9	0.2
Liberal Democrats win (new seat)			
Liberal Democrats win (new seat)			

Ewell Court, Auriol & Cuddington (2 seats)
Party	Candidate	Votes	%
Residents Association	Eber Kington	2,567	47.0
Residents Association	Peter O'Donovan	2,215	40.5
Reform	Iain Kinner	1,060	19.4
Liberal Democrats	Andrew Casey	994	18.2
Reform	Simon Keats	921	16.9
Liberal Democrats	Jeanne Ng	815	14.9
Conservative	Charlotte Angus	493	9.0
Green	Melissa Awcock	430	7.9
Green	David Lee	409	7.5
Conservative	Caleb Heather	392	7.2
Labour	Richard Chinn	175	3.2
Labour	Steve Dyke	163	3.0
Registered electors		12,002	
Turnout		5,465	100.0
Rejected ballots		12	0.2
Residents Association win (new seat)			
Residents Association win (new seat)			

Ewell Village, Stoneleigh & Nonsuch (2 seats)
Party	Candidate	Votes	%
Liberal Democrats	Alan Avis	1,993	31.5
Liberal Democrats	Julian Freeman	1,908	30.1
Residents Association	Hannah Dalton	1,558	24.6
Residents Association	Clive Woodbridge	1,460	23.1
Reform	Andy Aldridge	1,158	18.3
Conservative	Meera Persand	1,116	17.6
Conservative	Shanice Goldman	1,082	17.1
Reform	Steve Harding	1,049	16.6
Green	Kulsoom Bilgrami	436	6.9
Green	Kenneth Bradshaw	300	4.7
Labour	Helen Lewis	146	2.3
Labour	Bill Hodgkiss	129	2.0
Registered electors		12,319	
Turnout		6,330	100.0
Rejected ballots		5	0.1
Liberal Democrats win (new seat)			
Liberal Democrats win (new seat)			

West Ewell (2 seats)
Party	Candidate	Votes	%
Liberal Democrats	Jeremy Smith	1,815	35.9
Liberal Democrats	Sammi Villabon	1,712	33.9
Reform	Sarah Chambers	1,269	25.1
Reform	Simon Chambers	1,239	24.5
Residents Association	Lucie McIntyre	678	13.4
Residents Association	Neil Dallen	617	12.2
Green	Neil Friday	429	8.5
Green	Amandeep Sandhawalia	397	7.9
Conservative	Christopher Muller	377	7.5
Labour	Rob Geleit	357	7.1
Conservative	Tracy Muller	345	6.8
Independent	Alex Coley	331	6.5
Labour	Paul Martin	310	6.1
Registered electors		11,227	
Turnout		5,056	100.0
Rejected ballots		13	0.3
Liberal Democrats win (new seat)			
Liberal Democrats win (new seat)			

=== Mole Valley ===
Ashtead (2 seats)
Party	Candidate	Votes	%
Ashtead Independents	Chris Hunt	3,059	51.9
Ashtead Independents	Andy Smith	2,712	46.1
Liberal Democrats	Alison Kelly	1,015	17.2
Reform	Grant McMurray	922	15.7
Liberal Democrats	Andy Norman	914	15.5
Reform	Steve Suzuki	778	13.2
Conservative	Gavin Newton	566	9.6
Conservative	Roger Maunter	466	7.9
Green	Joanna Sherring	456	7.7
Green	Emily Stewart	355	6.0
Labour	Susan Gilchrist	150	2.5
Labour	Jason Anderson	109	1.9
Registered electors		11,391	
Turnout		5,889	100.0
Rejected ballots		9	0.2
Independent win (new seat)			
Independent win (new seat)			

Bookham & Fetcham West (2 seats)
Party	Candidate	Votes	%
Liberal Democrats	Caroline Joseph	3,273	47.5
Liberal Democrats	Andrew Matthews	3,158	45.8
Conservative	Louise Calland	1,684	24.4
Conservative	Guy Eason	1,527	22.1
Reform	Richard Granville	1,525	22.1
Reform	Rosie Joynson	1,451	21.0
Green	Alex Baines-Buffery	406	5.9
Green	Natt Tapley	329	4.8
Labour	Bill Peacock	126	1.8
Registered electors		12,565	
Turnout		6,894	54.9
Rejected ballots		8	0.1
Liberal Democrats win (new seat)			
Liberal Democrats win (new seat)			

Dorking (2 seats)
Party	Candidate	Votes	%
Liberal Democrats	Stephen Cooksey	3,210	54.2
Liberal Democrats	Bradley Nelson	2,838	47.9
Green	Chris Crook	1,043	17.6
Reform	Matthew Moreau	932	15.7
Green	Lisa Scott	877	14.8
Reform	Marion Woodville	812	13.7
Conservative	Sharon Dickinson	787	13.3
Conservative	Mark Saunders	672	11.3
Labour Co-op	Kev Stroud	250	4.2
SDP	Fred Tidy	42	0.7
Registered electors		11,394	
Turnout		5,921	52.1
Rejected ballots		13	0.2
Liberal Democrats win (new seat)			
Liberal Democrats win (new seat)			

Dorking Hills (2 seats)
Party	Candidate	Votes	%
Liberal Democrats	Claire Malcomson	2,475	44.0
Liberal Democrats	Abhiram Magesh	2,221	39.5
Reform	Matthew Carter	1,542	27.4
Reform	Leigh Jones	1,393	24.8
Conservative	Lucy Botting	1,223	21.7
Conservative	Khobi Patterson-Vallis	1,024	18.2
Green	James Poke	495	8.8
Green	John Roche	396	7.0
Labour Co-op	James Stringer	118	2.1
Registered electors		10,635	
Turnout		5,625	53.1
Rejected ballots		19	0.3
Liberal Democrats win (new seat)			
Liberal Democrats win (new seat)			

Dorking Rural (2 seats)
Party	Candidate	Votes	%
Liberal Democrats	Jo Farrar-Astrop	2,115	36.0
Liberal Democrats	Dineke van den Bogerd	1,969	33.5
Reform	Geoff Cox	1,773	30.2
Conservative	Helyn Clack	1,693	28.8
Reform	Jacqueline Inwood	1,581	26.9
Conservative	Marc Hanson	1,331	22.7
Green	Simon Bell	453	7.7
Green	Gerard Bolton	338	5.8
Labour	Noel Humphrey	109	1.9
Registered electors		10,345	
Turnout		5,873	56.9
Rejected ballots		10	0.2
Liberal Democrats win (new seat)			
Liberal Democrats win (new seat)			

Leatherhead & Fetcham East (2 seats)
Party	Candidate	Votes	%
Liberal Democrats	Alan Thompson	1,949	34.5
Liberal Democrats	Jolanta Waugh	1,893	33.5
Conservative	Tim Hall	1,693	29.9
Conservative	Alan Gibbs	1,462	25.9
Reform	Scott Kormis	1,253	22.2
Reform	David Izatt	1,244	22.0
Green	Juliette Littlewood	602	10.6
Green	Larissa Ezechie	535	9.5
Labour Co-op	Ann Clark	237	4.2
Labour	Morten Brinchmann	182	3.2
Registered electors		12,011	
Turnout		5,653	47.2
Rejected ballots		15	0.3
Liberal Democrats win (new seat)			
Liberal Democrats win (new seat)			

=== Reigate & Banstead ===
Banstead, Woodmansterne & Chipstead (2 seats)
Party	Candidate	Votes	%
Conservative	Lynne Fletcher	2,475	45.2
Conservative	James King	2,332	42.6
Reform	John Payten	1,440	26.3
Reform	Henry Smith	1,397	25.5
Liberal Democrats	Anthony Anderson	664	12.1
Liberal Democrats	Trixie Lawrence	586	10.7
Green	Megan Khan	528	9.6
Green	Jane Shufflebotham	500	9.1
Labour	Christopher Haslett	392	7.2
Labour	Mick Hay	343	6.3
Registered electors		10,885	
Turnout		5,476	100.0
Rejected ballots		14	0.3
Conservative win (new seat)			
Conservative win (new seat)			

Earlswood & Reigate South (2 seats)
Party	Candidate	Votes	%
Green	Neha Boghani	1,783	39.7
Green	Robin Whitwell	1,627	36.2
Reform	Chris Byrne	1,240	27.6
Reform	Joseph Fox	1,148	25.6
Conservative	Janis Colella	842	18.7
Conservative	Brian O'Neill	795	17.7
Liberal Democrats	Chris Kelly	446	9.9
Liberal Democrats	Robin Lawrence	365	8.1
Labour	Linda Giles	289	6.4
Labour	Marc Gainsford	271	6.0
Registered electors		9,958	
Turnout		4,493	45.2
Rejected ballots		6	0.1
Green win (new seat)			
Green win (new seat)			

Horley East (2 seats)
Party	Candidate	Votes	%
Reform	David Heaver	1,625	28.6
Liberal Democrats	Barry Maguire	1,614	28.4
Reform	Gary Bates	1,561	27.4
Liberal Democrats	Oliver Walter	1,474	25.9
Conservative	Samantha Marshall	1,333	23.4
Conservative	Taylor O'Driscoll	1,303	22.9
Green	Victoria Chester	1,205	21.2
Green	Steel Horton	1,020	17.9
Registered electors		11,744	
Turnout		5,688	48.6
Rejected ballots		15	0.3
Reform win (new seat)			
Liberal Democrats win (new seat)			

Horley West, Salfords & Sidlow (2 seats)
Party	Candidate	Votes	%
Liberal Democrats	Steve Wotton	1,839	36.8
Liberal Democrats	Andrew Stevens	1,703	34.1
Reform	Andy Lynch	1,696	33.9
Reform	William Stanway	1,536	30.7
Conservative	Michael Blacker	877	17.6
Conservative	Christian Stevens	756	15.1
Green	Madeleine Low	586	11.7
Green	Jason Thorne	493	9.9
Labour	Laurence Nasskau	222	4.4
Registered electors		11,391	
Turnout		4,996	43.9
Rejected ballots		7	0.1
Liberal Democrats win (new seat)			
Liberal Democrats win (new seat)			

Merstham & Banstead South (2 seats)
Party	Candidate	Votes	%
Green	Joel Gabriel	1,589	32.4
Green	Shasha Khan	1,544	31.5
Reform	Paul Hunt	1,436	29.3
Reform	Johnny Wolf	1,408	28.7
Conservative	Frank Kelly	1,026	20.9
Conservative	Bob Gardner	1,016	20.7
Liberal Democrats	Jemma de Vincenzo	430	8.8
Liberal Democrats	Graham Burr	406	8.3
Labour	Catherine Barrett	385	7.8
Labour	Agnes Conroy	291	5.9
Registered electors		10,630	
Turnout		4,909	100.0
Rejected ballots		11	0.2
Green win (new seat)			
Green win (new seat)			

Nork & Tattenhams (2 seats)
Party	Candidate	Votes	%
Nork and Tattenhams Residents' Associations	Peter Harp	2,900	51.5
Nork and Tattenhams Residents' Associations	Tim Snuggs	2,549	45.3
Reform	Steve Bastin	1,413	25.1
Reform	Elizabeth Cooper	1,402	24.9
Conservative	Pamela Freeman	693	12.3
Conservative	Adrian Freeman	653	11.6
Green	Paul Chandler	336	6.0
Liberal Democrats	Lexi Lawrence	271	4.8
Green	Christian Oster	251	4.5
Liberal Democrats	Sam Lewin-Mearing	221	3.9
Labour	Geoffrey Woodhead	179	3.2
Labour	Martin Webb	149	2.6
Registered electors		11,874	
Turnout		5,628	47.5
Rejected ballots		7	0.1
Residents win (new seat)			
Residents win (new seat)			

Redhill East & North Earlswood (2 seats)
Party	Candidate	Votes	%
Green	Jonathan Essex	2,798	59.5
Green	Stephen McKenna	2,391	50.8
Reform	Teresa Jacks	795	16.9
Conservative	Tom Foulser	715	15.2
Reform	David Payne	685	14.6
Conservative	Shysta Manzoor	522	11.1
Liberal Democrats	Martin Elbourne	382	8.1
Liberal Democrats	Stuart Holmes	341	7.2
Labour	Jack Ithell	270	5.7
Labour	Rosie Norgrove	261	5.5
Registered electors		10,299	
Turnout		4,705	45.9
Rejected ballots		18	0.4
Green win (new seat)			
Green win (new seat)			

Redhill West & Meadvale (2 seats)
Party	Candidate	Votes	%
Green	Nick Abear	1,482	28.8
Green	Elly Heaton	1,475	28.7
Liberal Democrats	Steve Kulka	1,430	27.8
Conservative	Richard Coad	1,143	22.2
Liberal Democrats	Gemma Roulston	1,132	22.0
Conservative	William de Save	947	18.4
Reform	David Bateman	895	17.4
Reform	Ian Covey	761	14.8
Labour Co-op	Elliott Wragg	433	8.4
Labour	Antony Robinson	394	7.7
Registered electors		10,419	
Turnout		5,142	49.4
Rejected ballots		10	0.2
Green win (new seat)			
Green win (new seat)			

Reigate (2 seats)
Party	Candidate	Votes	%
Liberal Democrats	Mark Johnston	2,054	33.8
Liberal Democrats	Mike Robinson	1,878	30.9
Conservative	Jon Mears	1,835	30.2
Conservative	Dharam Sharma	1,493	24.6
Green	Natasha Lawrence	882	14.5
Reform	Lisa Charters	880	14.5
Green	Paul Ingram	834	13.7
Independent	Victor Lewanski	778	12.8
Reform	Karolina Wolf	716	11.8
Labour	John Berge	277	4.6
Labour	Rex Giles	232	3.8
Registered electors		11,163	
Turnout		6,076	54.5
Rejected ballots		6	0.1
Liberal Democrats win (new seat)			
Liberal Democrats win (new seat)			

Tadworth, Walton & Kingswood (2 seats)
Party	Candidate	Votes	%
Conservative	Shelly Newton	2,289	40.0
Conservative	George Curry	2,213	38.7
Reform	Liam Tomkins	1,657	29.0
Reform	Terry Sankarsingh	1,425	24.9
Ind. Network	Zelanie Cooper	1,181	20.7
Green	Brian McGuirk	506	8.9
Green	Alistair Morten	441	7.7
Liberal Democrats	Thomas Dalton	426	7.5
Liberal Democrats	Helen Staddon	414	7.2
Labour	Andrew Kriek	219	3.8
Labour	Esme Wright	218	3.8
Registered electors		11,807	
Turnout		5,717	48.5
Rejected ballots		10	0.2
Conservative win (new seat)			
Conservative win (new seat)			

=== Tandridge ===
Caterham Hill (2 seats)
Party	Candidate	Votes	%
Liberal Democrats	Ben Horne	1,908	38.0
Liberal Democrats	Martin Redman	1,775	35.3
Reform	Max Barry	1,469	29.2
Reform	Osmund Stuart-Lee	1,222	24.3
Conservative	Michael Cooper	1,052	20.9
Conservative	Hoong-Wai Cheah	870	17.3
Green	Rebecca Gower	467	9.3
Green	Amanda Castles	406	8.1
Labour	Robin Clements	265	5.3
Labour	Stephanie Harvey	252	5.0
Registered electors		11,334	
Turnout		5,023	100.0
Rejected ballots		22	0.4
Liberal Democrats win (new seat)			
Liberal Democrats win (new seat)			

Caterham Valley (2 seats)
Party	Candidate	Votes	%
Liberal Democrats	Tony Pearce	1,871	45.3
Liberal Democrats	Robin Spencer	1,731	42.0
Reform	Laura Baker	1,019	24.7
Reform	Jamie Wheadon	876	21.2
Conservative	Sakina Bradbury	685	16.6
Conservative	Richard Mark	603	14.6
Green	Leo Domingues	415	10.1
Green	Nick Pont	281	6.8
Labour	Hamish McDougall	168	4.1
Labour	Amelie Wells	166	4.0
Registered electors		9,917	
Turnout		4,126	100.0
Rejected ballots		14	0.3
Liberal Democrats win (new seat)			
Liberal Democrats win (new seat)			

Godstone (2 seats)
Party	Candidate	Votes	%
Reform	Simon Lock	1,468	31.0
Reform	Steve Paris	1,456	30.7
Conservative	Liam Hammond	1,375	29.0
Conservative	Theo Harris	1,247	26.3
Liberal Democrats	Tamzie Hollands	1,031	21.8
Liberal Democrats	Roben Franklin	1,022	21.6
Green	Timothy Deadman	608	12.8
Green	Carol Ward	567	12.0
Labour	Sylvia Berry	246	5.2
Labour	Carron Walker	213	4.5
Registered electors		10,435	
Turnout		4,738	100.0
Rejected ballots		26	0.5
Reform win (new seat)			
Reform win (new seat)			

Lingfield (2 seats)
Party	Candidate	Votes	%
Conservative	Lesley Steeds	2,057	36.1
Reform	Nick Greenfield	2,055	36.1
Reform	Julia Searle	1,901	33.4
Conservative	Maureen Young	1,301	22.8
Independent	Judy Moore	1,000	17.6
Green	Catherine Baart	768	13.5
Liberal Democrats	Richard Fowler	658	11.5
Liberal Democrats	Dave Wilkes	529	9.3
Labour	Freyja Chapman	277	4.9
Labour	Emba Jones	218	3.8
Registered electors		12,345	
Turnout		5,698	100.0
Rejected ballots		20	0.4
Conservative win (new seat)			
Reform win (new seat)			

Oxted (2 seats)
Party	Candidate	Votes	%
Independent	Deb Shiner	2,216	37.3
Conservative	Cameron McIntosh	2,180	36.7
Independent	Bryan Black	1,796	30.2
Conservative	William Jarrett	1,207	20.3
Reform	James Milmine	1,156	19.4
Reform	Michael O'Connor	907	15.3
Green	Jessica Dracup-Holland	558	9.4
Labour	Abigail Chapman-Miller	446	7.5
Green	Gillian Vischer	352	5.9
Liberal Democrats	Fredericka Hampson	327	5.5
Liberal Democrats	Will Howells	311	5.2
Labour	Philip Son	222	3.7
Heritage	Chris Dean	42	0.7
Registered electors		11,552	
Turnout		5,945	100.0
Rejected ballots		6	0.1
Independent win (new seat)			
Conservative win (new seat)			

Warlingham (2 seats)
Party	Candidate	Votes	%
Independent	Jeremy Pursehouse	1,757	34.7
Reform	Ryan Bloomfield	1,504	29.7
Conservative	Robin Bloore	1,452	28.6
Reform	Natalie Butcher	1,388	27.4
Liberal Democrats	Perry Chotai	1,312	25.9
Conservative	John Yorke	822	16.2
Green	Sarah Stewart	522	10.3
Labour	Andrew Waters	230	4.5
Labour	Pat Hunter	159	3.1
Registered electors		10,344	
Turnout		5,069	100.0
Rejected ballots		34	0.7
Independent win (new seat)			
Reform win (new seat)			

== Changes 2026–2031 ==
- May 2026: The Liberal Democrat group agreed its shadow cabinet at the authority's inaugural meeting, with Kirsty Hewens as deputy leader and portfolio holders including Andrew Burton (finance and resources), Ashley Tilling (children's services and education), David Buxton (adult social care and health), Andrew Matthews (transport, highways and infrastructure), Bradley Nelson (strategic planning and growth), Julian Freeman (housing), Abhiram Magesh (leisure, culture and communities) and Claire Malcomson (climate, environment and waste).

=== Dorking Rural by-election ===
Dorking Rural by-election: 10 December 2026
Party	Candidate	Votes	%	±%
Conservative	Helyn Clack			
Reform	Geoff Cox			
Labour	Noel Humphrey			
Liberal Democrats	Victoria Nunn			
Green	Lisa Scott			
Majority				
Turnout				
		Swing		

== See also ==
- Surrey County Council elections
- Elmbridge Borough Council elections
- Epsom and Ewell Borough Council elections
- Mole Valley District Council elections
- Reigate and Banstead Borough Council elections
- Tandridge District Council elections
- 2026-2028 English local government reorganisation
