= 2019 Tandridge District Council election =

2019 UK local government election

Results of the 2019 Tandridge District Council election

The 2019 Tandridge District Council election took place on 2 May 2019 to elect one third of members to Tandridge District Council in England coinciding with other local elections

== Results ==
Tandridge District Council Election 2019 results.

Tandridge District Council Election, 2019
Party	Seats	Gains	Losses	Net gain/loss	Seats %	Votes %	Votes	+/−
Conservative	4	0	8	-8	28.6	29.8	5612	
Liberal Democrats	3	2	0	+2	21.4	17.4	3293	
Independent	4	3	0	+3	28.6	21.0	3961	
Labour	0	0	0	0	0	4.3	808	
Residents	3	3	0	+3	21.4	20.7	3909	
UKIP	0	0	0	0	0	4.6	889	
Green	0	0	0	0	0	1.4	292	
SDP	0	0	0	0	0	0.8	148	

== Ward results ==
An asterisk * indicates an incumbent seeking re-election.

Bletchingley and Nutfield
Party	Candidate	Votes	%	±%
Conservative	Gill Black*	683	44.6	
UKIP	Helena Windsor	364	23.7	
Liberal Democrats	Richard Fowler	341	22.2	
Labour	Linda Baharier	145	9.5	
Majority		319	20.9	
Turnout		1,540	35.0	
Conservative hold		Swing		

Burstow, Horne and Outwood
Party	Candidate	Votes	%	±%
Independent	Colin White	677	41.9	
Conservative	Lydia Ridge	589	36.5	
Liberal Democrats	Judy Wilkinson	134	8.3	
Green	Catherine Baart	129	8.0	
Labour	Fern Warwick-Ching	86	5.3	
Majority		88	5.4	
Turnout		1,635	34.9	
Independent gain from Conservative		Swing		

Chaldon
Party	Candidate	Votes	%	±%
Conservative	Bob Milton	418	69.1	
Liberal Democrats	Neil Parker	114	18.8	
UKIP	Graham Bailey	56	9.3	
Labour	Darron Ward	17	2.8	
Majority		304	50.3	
Turnout		605	42.1%	
Conservative hold		Swing		

Dormansland and Felcourt
Party	Candidate	Votes	%	±%
Conservative	Lesley Steeds*	585	45.6	
Independent	Bridget Davy	552	43.1	
Liberal Democrats	Dave Wilkes	145	11.3	
Majority		33	2.5	
Turnout		1,282	42.1%	
Conservative hold		Swing		

Felbridge
Party	Candidate	Votes	%	±%
Conservative	Ken Harwood*	489	65.0	
Independent	Mike Crane	175	23.3	
Green	Rebecca Peterson	88	11.7	
Majority		314	41.7	
Turnout		752	43.2%	
Conservative hold		Swing		

Godstone
Party	Candidate	Votes	%	±%
Independent	Charlotte Swann	1,354	73.1	
Conservative	Nick Childs*	266	14.4	
Liberal Democrats	David Nickols	83	4.5	
Green	Peter Murphy	75	4.0	
Labour	Barbara Wantling	75	4.0	
Majority		1,088	58.7	
Turnout		1,853	41.2%	
Independent gain from Conservative		Swing		

Limpsfield
Party	Candidate	Votes	%	±%
Residents	Claire Blackwell	1,043	70.4	
Conservative	Richard Adamson	349	23.6	
Liberal Democrats	Martin Caxton	89	6.0	
Majority		694	46.8	
Turnout		1,481	52%	
Residents gain from Conservative		Swing		

Lingfield and Crowhurst
Party	Candidate	Votes	%	±%
Independent	Liz Lockwood*	887	66.2	
Conservative	Clive Jecks	334	24.9	
Liberal Democrats	Peter Montagnon	119	8.9	
Majority		553	41.3	
Turnout		1,340	41.5%	
Independent gain from Conservative		Swing		

In the previous election in 2015 Liz Lockwood won the seat for the Conservatives, before declaring as an Independent on 25 May 2017.

Oxted North and Tandridge
Party	Candidate	Votes	%	±%
Residents	David Stamp	1,584	67.8	
Conservative	Martin Fisher*	578	24.7	
Liberal Democrats	Sheelagh Crampton	111	4.8	
Labour	Patrick Rogers	63	2.7	
Majority		1,006	47.1	
Turnout		2,336	49.5%	
Residents gain from Conservative		Swing		

Oxted South
Party	Candidate	Votes	%	±%
Residents	Chris Langton	1,282	63.3	
Conservative	Alan Feesey	334	16.5	
SDP	Helena Forsythe	148	7.3	
Labour	Che Ramsden	142	7.0	
Liberal Democrats	Jonathan Salisbury	119	5.9	
Majority		948	46.8	
Turnout		2,025	42.9%	
Residents gain from Conservative		Swing		

Portley
Party	Candidate	Votes	%	±%
Liberal Democrats	Kerry Mansfield	595	55.9	
Conservative	Sakina Bradbury	276	25.9	
UKIP	Mark Fowler	119	11.2	
Labour	Ian Giddings	74	7.0	
Majority		319	30.0	
Turnout		1,064	31.3%	
Liberal Democrats gain from Conservative		Swing		

Tatsfield and Titsey
Party	Candidate	Votes	%	±%
Independent	Martin Allen*	316	58.0	
Conservative	Alex Standen	132	24.2	
UKIP	Christopher Dean	63	11.6	
Labour	Sarah Stewart	34	6.2	
Majority		184	33.8	
Turnout		545	36.3%	
Independent hold		Swing		

Valley
Party	Candidate	Votes	%	±%
Liberal Democrats	Dorinda Cooper*	647	62.5	
Conservative	Adam Bradbury	179	17.3	
UKIP	Judy Moore	110	10.6	
Labour	Carron Walker	99	9.6	
Majority		468	45.2	
Turnout		1,035	31.9%	
Liberal Democrats hold		Swing		

Warlingham East, Chelsham and Farleigh
Party	Candidate	Votes	%	±%
Liberal Democrats	Celia Caulcott	796	55.0	
Conservative	Perry Chotai	400	27.7	
UKIP	Martin Haley	177	12.2	
Labour	Michael Snowden	73	5.0	
Majority		396	27.3	
Turnout		1,446		
Liberal Democrats gain from Conservative		Swing		
