= Residents Associations of Epsom and Ewell =

British local political party

- Leader: Robert Bevan
- Nominating Officer: Richard Baker
- Treasurer: Keith Lugton
- Founded: 1937
- Headquarters: 49 Harefield Avenue; Epsom and Ewell; Surrey
- Surrey County Council: 3 / 81
- Epsom and Ewell Borough Council: 21 / 35

Website
- www.epsomewellra.org.uk

The Residents Associations of Epsom and Ewell is a local political party in the borough of Epsom and Ewell in Surrey, England. They have held majority control of Epsom and Ewell Borough Council since its formation in 1937. The party is sometimes recorded as Other in national results lists and otherwise recorded alongside residents associations with a single Articles of Association. It consists of ward or multiple ward based residents associations with their own candidate selection rules. These include Ewell Court Residents' Association, Epsom Town Residents' Association and West Ewell and Ruxley Residents’ Association.

Since the 2023 Epsom and Ewell Borough Council election, the Residents Association has controlled the council.

== History ==
The majority of Residents' Associations were formed from the expansion of housing provision in the 1930s, with the aim of bettering the lives of residents and forming a community. This tradition of forming residents' groups on new developments in the borough continues today, such as with Clarendon Park Residents' Association, which was formed in 2001.

Traditionally, throughout the UK, local councillors would stand as independents. However, throughout the 20th century, it became common for councillors to be elected with a party affiliation. Today, Epsom and Ewell Borough Council and Uttlesford District Council in Essex are the only two councils in England where Residents' Associations have overall control. In 2017, the party faced criticism from the Conservatives for standing candidates to the county council outside where they lived, but said they were focussing of safety, fly-tipping, and finances.

== Structure ==
There are eleven independent Residents Associations that form the Residents' Associations of Epsom and Ewell. The Standing Committee of Residents Associations (SCoRA) provides a forum for the Residents' Associations to discuss common issues or borough-wide concerns. These meetings are for the chair and secretary of the respective groups; however, councillors may be asked to attend these forums to update SCoRA on progress or concerns with the council.

=== WERRA ===
WERRA logo

The West Ewell and Ruxley Residents Association (WERRA was formed in 1956 as a voluntary and unincorporated association, composed of members and a committee, with annual membership fees. The committee has a chair, vice-chair, secretary and a treasurer. There are also sub-groups for Revenue & Communications, Highways & Safety and Environment. Committee members are drawn from a variety of backgrounds with experience ranging from the armed forces, the police, the NHS and the civil service. Some are also small business owners or work in the corporate world. All committee members live in the local area, some having lived in the wards all their lives. The WERRA committee also features three former mayors of Epsom and Ewell.

The area spans two wards and is represented on the Epsom and Ewell Borough Council by six councillors Candidates from the WERRA committee contest all six available ward councillor seats and one divisional county councillor seat, standing for election under the Residents Associations of Epsom and Ewell. They have had all six elected councillors on Epsom and Ewell Borough Council, three for West Ewell and three for Ruxley. At county level the division is West Ewell, with one county councillor on Surrey County Council.

== Election results ==
=== Epsom and Ewell Borough Council ===
The RA contests all 35 available ward councillor seats and are the controlling group on Epsom and Ewell Borough Council, a long-standing domination of the borough council. They currently have 25 elected councillors in the following multiple member wards:

- Auriol – 2 of 2
- College – 0 of 3
- Court – 0 of 3
- Cuddington – 3 of 3
- Ewell Village – 2 of 2
- Ewell Court – 2 of 2
- Horton – 0 of 2
- Nonsuch – 3 of 3
- Ruxley – 1 of 2
- Stamford – 1 of 2
- Stoneleigh – 2 of 2
- Town – 3 of 3
- West Ewell – 3 of 3
- Woodcote & Langley Vale – 3 of 3

=== Surrey County Council ===
Candidates from local residents associations contest county elections under the banner of the Residents Associations of Epsom and Ewell, which is a registered political party. This differs from borough elections, where some residents associations are registered as political parties in their own right, while some are not. The RAs of Epsom & Ewell currently have four elected county councillors, in the following single member divisions:

- Ewell
- Ewell Court, Auriol & Cuddington
- West Ewell
- Epsom Town and Downs

The other division has a Conservative councillor:

- Epsom West

== Notes ==
1.By-elections were held in Cuddington ward in 2021 and West Ewell ward in 2022, following the deaths of two councillors.

== Bibliography ==
- "London: Local election preview". BBC News. 4 April 2003.
- "Residents hold control of Epsom". BBC News. 4 May 2007.
- "Residents Associations of Epsom and Ewell". Electoral Commission. 2 February 2001.
