= Epsom and Ewell =

Borough in Surrey, England

Coordinates: 51.3329°N 0.2651°W

Borough of Epsom and Ewell
- Borough and non-metropolitan district
- Motto: None Such
- Epsom and Ewell shown within Surrey
- Sovereign state: United Kingdom
- Constituent country: England
- Region: South East England
- Non-metropolitan county: Surrey
- Status: Non-metropolitan district, Borough
- Admin HQ: Epsom

Government
  - Type: Non-metropolitan district council
  - Body: Epsom and Ewell Borough Council
  - MPs: Helen Maguire (Liberal Democrats)

Area
  - Total: 13.15 sq mi (34.07 km^{2})
  - Rank: 274th (of 296)

Population (2025)
  - Total: 83,370
  - Rank: 279th (of 296)
  - Density: 6,338/sq mi (2,447/km^{2})

Ethnicity (2021)
  - Ethnic groups: List: 79.5% White; 11.4% Asian; 4.4% Mixed; 2.8% other; 1.9% Black

Religion (2021)
  - Religion: List: 48.1% Christianity; 35.7% no religion; 6.1% not stated; 4.9% Islam; 3.6% Hinduism; 0.7% Buddhism; 0.4% other; 0.3% Judaism; 0.1% Sikhism
- Time zone: UTC0 (GMT)
  - Summer (DST): UTC+1 (BST)
- ONS code: 43UC (ONS); E07000208 (GSS)
- OS grid reference: TQ205605

Epsom and Ewell (/ˈjuːəl, juːl/) is a local government district with borough status in Surrey, England, covering the towns of Epsom and Ewell. The borough lies just outside the administrative boundary of Greater London, but it is entirely within the M25 motorway which encircles London. Many of the borough's urban areas form part of the wider Greater London Built-up Area.

The neighbouring districts are Reigate and Banstead, Mole Valley, Kingston upon Thames and Sutton, the latter two being London boroughs.

== History ==
Epsom and Ewell lies on the spring line on the north face of the North Downs where pervious chalk meets impervious London clay and a series of springs form. In Ewell the springs which form the Hogsmill River are evident, those in Epsom are less so. The springs attracted prehistoric people and remains have been found, mostly in Ewell and particularly near the Hogsmill. In Roman times the road now known as Stane Street, from London to Chichester, passed through Epsom and Ewell. Roman remains have been found in Ewell suggesting a sizeable settlement. Epsom and Ewell have Saxon names: Ewell takes its name from the spring in the centre of the town and Epsom, or Ebbisham, is the enclosure of Ebbi. A Saxon cemetery in The Grove in Ewell was excavated in the 1930s.

In medieval times the area was covered by three manors: Cuddington, which was owned by the Codington family; Epsom, which belonged to Chertsey Abbey; and Ewell, associated with Merton Priory. In 1538 the village of Cuddington was destroyed to make way for Henry VIII's Nonsuch Palace and its parks. Henry died before the palace was complete but it was visited by his daughter Queen Elizabeth. It was demolished in 1682.

Epsom became a spa in the early 17th century when a spring containing Epsom salts was discovered on the Common. Its popularity with London society brought visits from Samuel Pepys and Nell Gwynne, the development of shops and inns and the oldest spa assembly rooms in England. This stands at the western end of Epsom High Street. Horse racing on Epsom Downs began during the spa period, but it was not until the Oaks was run in 1789 and the Derby the following year that it took on its present form. The first grandstand was built in 1830 and Queen's Stand in 1995. The 1927 grandstand was demolished in 2007/8 and the new Duchess's Stand opened in its place in 2009.

Many large houses were built in Epsom during and after the spa period. St Martin's Church was rebuilt in 1825 and partly rebuilt in 1908 and the clock tower in the centre of the town replaced the earlier watchhouse in 1847. Ewell saw less change and, although now surrounded by suburbia. Its medieval church was replaced by the present Victorian one in 1848, but the medieval tower stands in the churchyard.

The Pre-Raphaelite painters, John Everett Millais and William Holman Hunt, had connections with both Ewell and Cuddington and used local scenes as backgrounds for a number of paintings, notably 'Ophelia' by Millais and 'The Light of the World' by Hunt.

In 1937, shortly after the creation of the current district, Epsom and Ewell was granted a coat of arms, which displays the district's link with horse racing and spas. It is blazoned: Per chevron vert and argent, in chief two horses heads erased or and in base as many bars wavy azure. The motto is "None Such", a pun on Nonsuch Palace. The same arms, with a different motto, are used by the local Epsom and Ewell High School.

In 1994 and 1995, minor alterations were made to the boundary of Epsom and Ewell with Greater London. This was first to better align the boundary with the Hogsmill River in West Ewell, as well as the roads in Stoneleigh. Prior to 1995, the border had followed the edge of old field boundaries not present since the development of Stoneleigh in the 1930s, causing the border to dissect roads, houses and gardens. The 1994-95 boundary alterations made very little net change in Epsom and Ewell's population.

In 1995 Epsom and Ewell twinned with Chantilly in northern France, another racing town. Links are coordinated by Epsom and Ewell Town Twinning Association.

=== Administrative history ===
The parish of Epsom was made a local board district in 1850. Such districts were reconstituted as urban districts in 1894. The urban district was enlarged in 1933 to take in the parishes of Ewell and Cuddington, and the following year the district's name was changed to "Epsom and Ewell". It was made a municipal borough in 1937.

The district was considered for inclusion in Greater London in 1965 but was left unaltered by the London Government Act 1963. The district was redesignated as a non-metropolitan district in 1974 under the Local Government Act 1972, but kept the same boundaries and its borough status, allowing the chair of the council to take the title of mayor, continuing Epsom and Ewell's series of mayors dating back to 1937.

The area was in the Metropolitan Police District from 1840 until it was transferred to Surrey Police in 2000.

As part of upcoming structural changes to local government in England, the district will be abolished in April 2027 and the area will become part of the new unitary authority of East Surrey.

== Governance ==
Epsom and Ewell Borough Council

Type
- Type: Non-metropolitan district

Leadership
- Mayor: Lucie McIntyre, Residents' Association since 26 May 2026
- Leader: Hannah Dalton, Residents' Association since 13 May 2025
- Chief Executive: Jackie King since 2022

Structure
- Seats: 35 councillors
- Political groups: Administration (21) Residents' Assoc. (21) Other parties (14) Labour Party (4) Conservative (4) Liberal Democrats (2) Independent (4)

Elections
- Voting system: First past the post
- Last election: 4 May 2023
- Next election: to be abolished

Meeting place
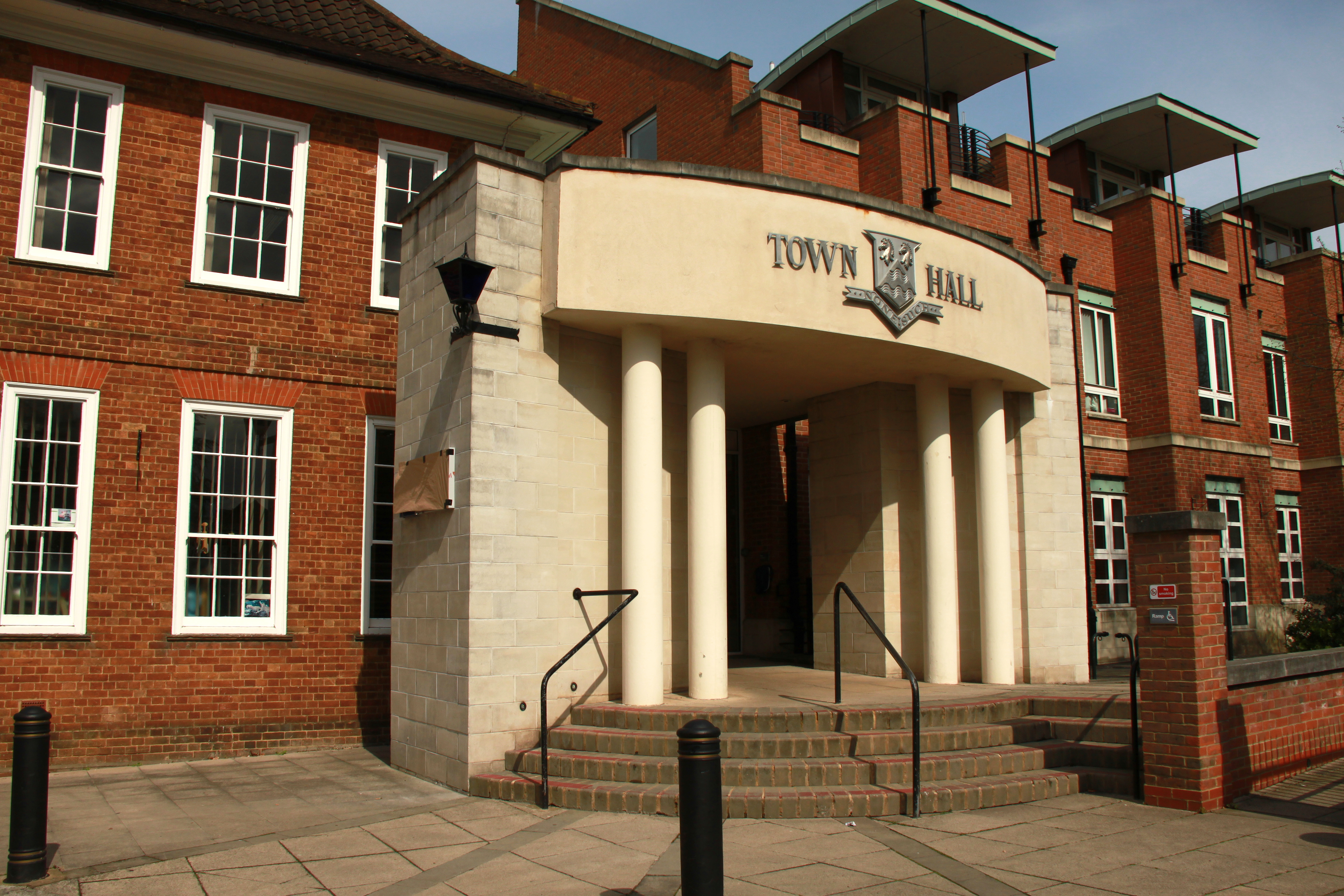
- Town Hall, The Parade, Epsom, KT18 5BY

Website
- www.epsom-ewell.gov.uk

Epsom and Ewell Borough Council provides district-level services. County-level services are provided by Surrey County Council. There are no civil parishes in the borough, which is an unparished area.

=== Political control ===
Epsom and Ewell is one of the few councils dominated by a group not linked to a national political party. Epsom and Ewell Residents Association has been the main group on the council since the 1930s. Party affiliations were not recorded on ballot papers prior to 1970, but the Residents Association has certainly held a majority of the seats on the council since the reforms of 1974:

Party or group in control	Years
Residents Association	1974–present

=== Leadership ===
The role of mayor is largely ceremonial at Epsom and Ewell Borough Council, with political leadership being provided by the leader of the council. Until 2025, the council did not formally appoint a leader of the council, and political leadership functions were split between the chair of the Residents Association and the chair of the strategy and resources committee. The leader since the introduction of the post in 2025 has been:

Councillor	Party	From	To
Hannah Dalton	Residents Association	13 May 2025	

From 2011 until the introduction of the leader position in 2025, the chairs of the Residents Association were:

Councillor	Party	From	To
Robert Leach	Residents Association		Mar 2011
Clive Woodbridge	Residents Association	Mar 2011	17 May 2016
Neil Dallen	Residents Association	17 May 2016	16 May 2017
Clive Smitheram	Residents Association	16 May 2017	May 2021
Hannah Dalton	Residents Association	18 May 2021	13 May 2025

The chairs of the strategy and resources committee since 2015 have been:

Councillor	Party	From	To
Neil Dallen	Residents Association	pre-2015	17 May 2016
Eber Kington	Residents Association	17 May 2016	18 May 2021
Colin Keane	Residents Association	18 May 2021	16 May 2022
Neil Dallen	Residents Association	16 May 2022	

=== Composition ===
Following the 2023 election, and subsequent changes of allegiance up to June 2026, the composition of the council was:

Party	Councillors
Residents Association	21
Labour	4
Conservative	4
Liberal Democrats	2
Independent	4
Total	35

=== Elections ===
Since the last boundary changes in 2023 the council has comprised 35 councillors representing 14 wards, with each ward electing two or three councillors. Elections were held every four years.

Further full borough council elections were cancelled in 2026, and an election for the new East Surrey Council was held instead. East Surrey Council will formally come into being and take over local government functions in the area on 1 April 2027, at which point Epsom and Ewell Borough Council and the borough of Epsom and Ewell will be abolished.

Epsom and Ewell Parliamentary Constituency is one of the most Conservative seats and contains the entirety of the borough. As the population is not large enough for a full seat, it has also contained neighbouring areas. Since 1997 it also contains Ashtead, part of the Mole Valley district. Before boundaries changed in 1997 the constituency instead contained Banstead to the east, which is part of Reigate and Banstead borough.

=== Premises ===
The council is based at Epsom Town Hall on The Parade, which was completed in 1934 for the old Epsom Urban District Council.

== Geography ==
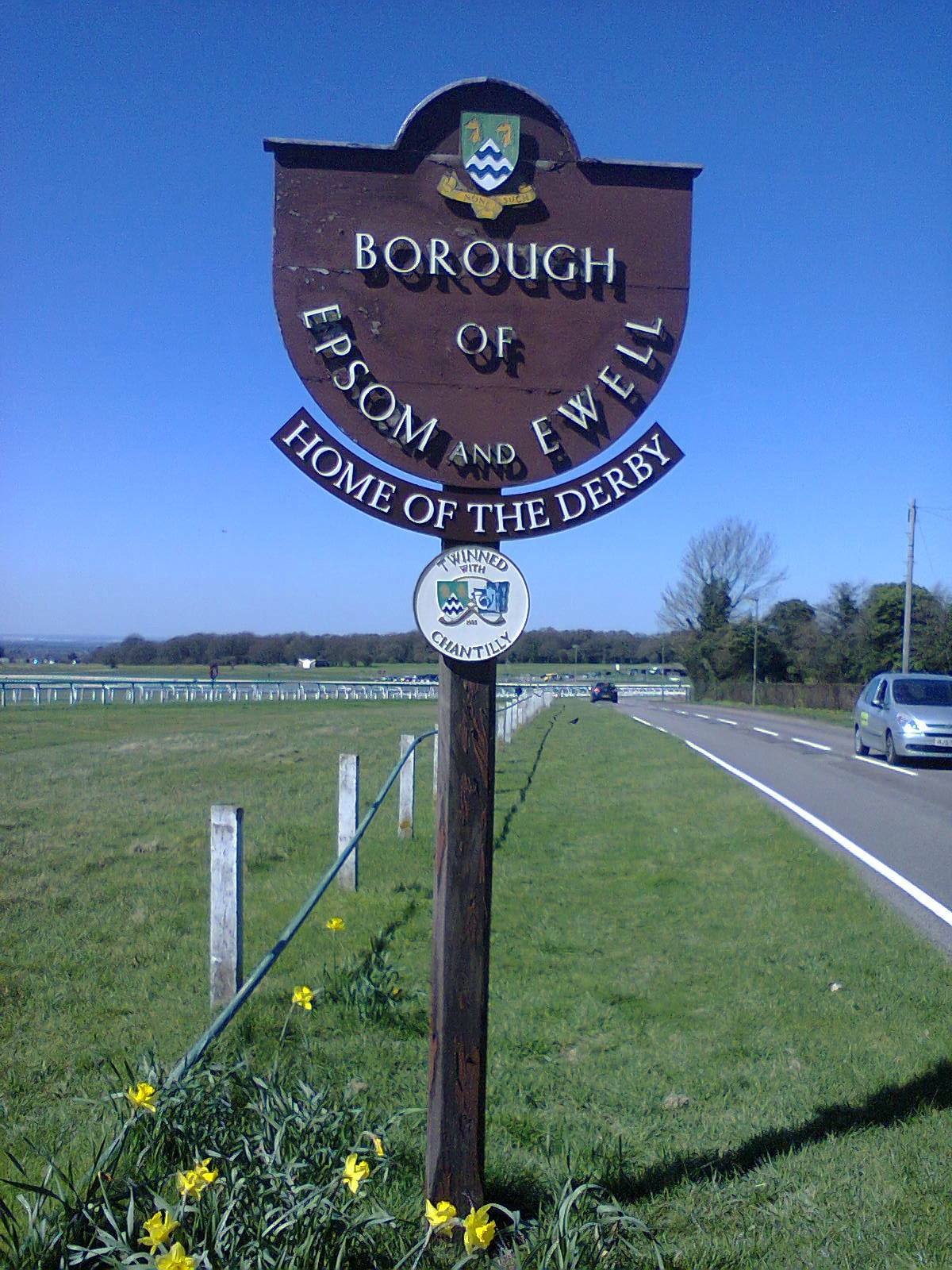
One of the "Borough of Epsom and Ewell" signs placed at a boundary, on Epsom Lane North, Epsom Downs.

The borough is at a range of elevations, scaling the lower slopes of the North Downs and drains into a large stream which springs above the surface in Ewell, the Hogsmill River which drains into the Thames at Kingston. The borough comprises:

- Epsom. Town and home of the Epsom Downs Racecourse.
- Ewell. Town and contains the suburbs of East Ewell, Ewell Court, Ewell Downs and West Ewell.
- Horton. Village west of Epsom.
- Langley Vale. Village to the south of Epsom Downs.
- Stoneleigh (except the far north of the suburb). Contains a large part of Nonsuch Park.
- Worcester Park (part) (Cuddington ward).

A small portion of Cheam, including the eastern part of Nonsuch Park, as well as Nonsuch High School for Girls is in the eastern edge of the Borough.

=== Demography and economics ===
Much of the working population has middle (average) to upper-middle class levels of income. As to housing estates, housing prices are highest in the less densely developed Downs areas including the immediate border area to Cheam and Banstead; only the north-east of Epsom has housing close to the national average price. Its working class and its social housing recipients are concentrated most in the Ruxley and Court Wards of the Borough, among the most deprived in Surrey, but less so than the 50 most deprived wards of London. The average house price from sales in May 2021 was £561,577.

House prices in May 2021
Detached	£775,000
One-bed	£271,671
Two-bed	£376,799
Flat	£254,000

2011 census - working age benefits and tenure
Benefits: People of working age claiming a key benefit	8%
Owns outright	36.8
Owns with a mortgage or loan	40.2
Part-owner with equity provider	0.9
Social rented: Rented from council	0.6
Social rented: Other	7.5
Private rented: Private landlord or letting agency	12.2
Private rented: Other	1.1
Living rent free	0.8

== Transport ==
Railway stations in the borough include Epsom, Ewell East, Ewell West and Stoneleigh. Epsom Downs and Tattenham Corner stations sit on the borough borders. All stations in the Borough have accepted the Oyster card as payment and all except Epsom are in either fare zone 5 or 6. The borough is just north of, and entirely within, the M25 motorway. Gatwick Airport is 20 miles south from Epsom.

Numerous bus services run through Ewell into Epsom town centre such as London Buses services 166, 293, 406, 418, S2 and Surrey County Council subsidised services 460, 480, 318, Epsom local area routes E5, E9, E10 and E16. Most services were previously run by Quality Line however since the takeover of Epsom Coaches by the RATP Group, the Surrey County Council and commercial services have been contracted to different operators such as Falcon Buses and Metrobus and the now defunct Buses Excetera (also known as Coaches Excetera) or have been discontinued entirely.

== Education ==
The Borough of Epsom and Ewell has several secondary schools; Glyn School, Epsom and Ewell High School, Rosebery School for Girls and Blenheim High School. In addition it also has two private, fee paying schools; Epsom College and Ewell Castle School. The borough also contains a special school for children and young people with autism and social communication difficulties; Linden Bridge School, in Worcester Park.

=== Further education ===
- North East Surrey College of Technology

=== Higher education ===
- University for the Creative Arts
