= List of local nature reserves in Surrey =

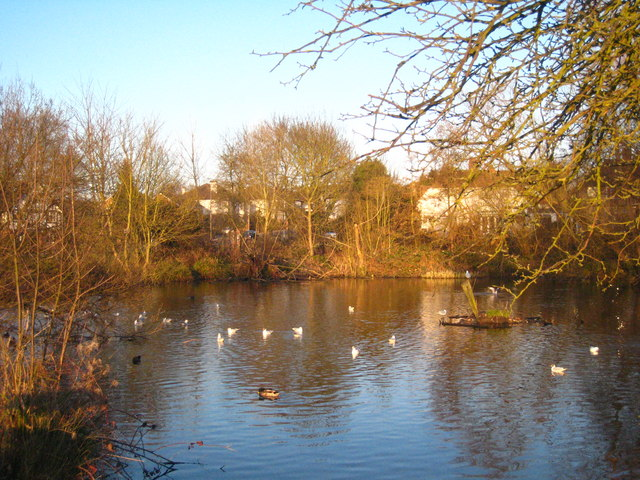
Stamford Green Pond on Epsom Common

Local nature reserves are designated by local authorities under the National Parks and Access to the Countryside Act 1949. The local authority must have a legal control over the site, by owning or leasing it or having an agreement with the owner. Local nature reserves are sites which have a special local interest either biologically or geologically. Local authorities have a duty to care for them, and can apply local bye-laws to manage and protect them.

As of January 2019, there are forty-four local nature reserves in Surrey. Fourteen sites are Sites of Special Scientific Interest, five are Special Protection Areas, three are Special Areas of Conservation, one is listed on the Register of Historic Parks and Gardens, one is a Nature Conservation Review site and one is a Geological Conservation Review site. Two sites are scheduled monuments and fourteen are managed by the Surrey Wildlife Trust.

Surrey is a county in South East England. It has an area of 642 square miles (1,660 square kilometres) and an estimated population of 1.1 million as of 2017. It is bordered by Greater London, Kent, East Sussex, West Sussex, Hampshire and Berkshire. Its top level of government is provided by Surrey County Council and the lower level by eleven boroughs and districts, Elmbridge, Epsom and Ewell, Guildford, Mole Valley, Reigate and Banstead, Runnymede, Spelthorne, Surrey Heath, Tandridge, Waverley and Woking.

== Other classifications ==
- GCR = Geological Conservation Review site
- NCR = Nature Conservation Review site
- RHPG = Register of Historic Parks and Gardens of Special Historic Interest in England
- SAC = Special Area of Conservation
- SM = Scheduled Monument
- SPA = Special Protection Area under the European Union Directive on the Conservation of Wild Birds
- SSSI = Site of Special Scientific Interest
- SWT = Surrey Wildlife Trust

== Sites ==
Site	Photograph	Area (Note: Details and area are on the 'Designated Sites View' pages on each site in the Natural England database of local nature reserves.)	Location (Note: The location is taken from the Natural England details page for the site.)	Borough or District	Other classifications	Map (Note: The maps are on the Natural England database of local nature reserves.)	Details	Description
Ashtead Park	Ashtead Park	24.2 hectares (60 acres)	Ashtead; 51.313°N 0.291°W; TQ 192 585	Mole Valley	RHPG, SWT	Map	Details	The nature reserve was formerly part of the park of Ashtead House. It is mainly woodland on heavy London Clay and it has two ponds. Fauna include the broad-bodied chaser and emperor dragonflies and the common blue damselfly.
Bisley and West End Commons	Bisley Common	37.2 hectares (92 acres)	West End; 51.327°N 0.651°W; SU 941 595	Surrey Heath	SAC, SPA, SSSI, SWT	Map	Details	This site has heath, grassland and woodland. There are mammals such as roe deer and reptiles include adders, grass snakes, slow-worms and common lizards.
Blanchman's Farm	Blanchman's Farm	9.4 hectares (23 acres)	Warlingham; 51.305°N 0.052°W; TQ 359 580	Tandridge		Map	Details	This site has woodland, two meadows, a pond and an orchard. There are black hairstreak butterflies and mammals include red foxes, roe deer, wood mice.
Blindley Heath	Blindley Heath	25.8 hectares (64 acres)	Godstone; 51.186°N 0.045°W; TQ 367 448	Tandridge	SSSI, SWT	Map	Details	This damp grassland site on Weald Clay has a rich flora. There are also a number of ponds and a stretch of the Ray Brook runs through the heath. The grassland is dominated by tussock grass and there are scattered oaks, hawthorns, willows and blackthorns.
Brentmoor Heath	Brentmoor Heath	28.6 hectares (71 acres)	West End; 51.340°N 0.655°W; SU 938 610	Surrey Heath	SAC, SPA, SSSI, SWT	Map	Details	The nature reserve has heathland, woodland, acid grassland and ponds. There are grass snakes and adders, and birds such as woodlarks, Dartford warblers, peregrine falcons and hobbies.
Centenary Fields	Centenary Fields	4.2 hectares (10 acres)	Lingfield; 51.178°N 0.016°W; TQ 386 440	Tandridge		Map	Details	This site, which is managed by local volunteers, has grassland, a wildflower meadow, allotments and a butterfly garden. A local variety of apple, the Lingfield Forge, is being grown in a community orchard.
Chertsey Meads	Chertsey Meads	41.0 hectares (101 acres)	Chertsey; 51.385°N 0.477°W; TQ 061 662	Runnymede		Map	Details	This is an area of floodplain meadow on the bank of the River Thames. Over 400 plant species have been recorded and 108 bird species, including lesser whitethroat, reed bunting, reed warbler and sedge warbler.
Chinthurst Hill	Chinthurst Hill	17.2 hectares (43 acres)	Guildford; 51.203°N 0.553°W; TQ 012 459	Guildford	SM, SWT	Map	Details	The hill has woodland and dry acid grassland. There are woodland flowering plants such as wood anemone, yellow archangel, wood forget-me-not, red campion, common figwort, butcher’s broom and lady’s smock.
Claygate Common	Claygate Common	14.1 hectares (35 acres)	Claygate; 51.354°N 0.336°W; TQ 160 630	Elmbridge		Map	Details	The common is woodland with oak, beech and hornbeam. It has birds such as common kestrels, green woodpeckers and sparrowhawks.
Earlswood Common	Earlswood Common	89.1 hectares (220 acres)	Redhill; 51.223°N 0.181°W; TQ 271 487	Reigate and Banstead		Map	Details	Habitats on the common include woodland, semi-improved grassland, two large lakes, several ponds and wetland corridors. There are diverse insect species and mammals such as roe deer, foxes, rabbits and bats.
Edolph's Copse	Edolph's Copse	27.6 hectares (68 acres)	Charlwood; 51.167°N 0.235°W; TQ 235 423	Mole Valley		Map	Details	The copse is mainly secondary woodland but it has areas of ancient forest. The most common trees are oak, hazel and hornbeam, with a few crab apples and hawthorns and a large wild service tree. There are also several ponds and some grassland.
Epsom Common	Epsom Common	177.4 hectares (438 acres)	Epsom; 51.328°N 0.292°W; TQ 191 602	Epsom and Ewell	SSSI	Map	Details	This is a nationally important wildlife site due to its breeding birds and to its insects which depend on dead wood. Other fauna include roe deer, herons and purple emperor butterflies, and there are flora such as common spotted and southern marsh orchids.
Esher Common	Esher Common	137.2 hectares (339 acres)	Esher; 51.348°N 0.376°W; TQ 132 622	Elmbridge	SSSI	Map	Details	More than 2,000 species of invertebrates have been recorded on the common, out of which many are nationally rare or scarce. They include the brilliant emerald dragonfly, small red damselfly and white-letter hairstreak butterfly.
Farnham Park	Farnham Park	131.0 hectares (324 acres)	Farnham; 51.225°N 0.797°W; SU 841 480	Waverley		Map	Details	This medieval deer park has an avenue of mature trees which is over a kilometre long. There is grassland, woodland, ponds and streams.
The Flashes	The Flashes	115.1 hectares (284 acres)	Farnham; 51.150°N 0.768°W; SU 863 397	Waverley	SAC, SPA, SSSI	Map	Details	Most of The Flashes is a river valley mire with purple moor-grass, cross-leaved heath, common cottongrass, heather, rushes and sphagnum mosses. Part of the site is covered with peat.
Fox Corner Wildlife Area	Fox Corner Wildlife Area	6.2 hectares (15 acres)	Woking; 51.282°N 0.624°W; SU 961 545	Guildford		Map	Details	The wildlife area was created in 1990 following compulsory purchase of the site. It has woods, a wildflower meadow and a pond. There are birds such as the great spotted woodpecker, small tortoiseshell and comma butterflies, while flowering plants include grass vetchling and meadowsweet.
Hackhurst Downs	Hackhurst Downs	29.9 hectares (74 acres)	Gomshall; 51.226°N 0.433°W; TQ 095 486	Guildford	SSSI, SWT	Map	Details	Much of this steeply sloping site is chalk grassland which is grazed by goats, and there are also areas of mature woodland and scrub. Flowering plants include wild marjoram, hedge bedstraw, vervain, harebell and mouse-ear hawkweed.
Hill Park, Tatsfield	Hill Park	24.5 hectares (61 acres)	Tatsfield; 51.284°N 0.039°W; TQ 423 559	Tandridge	SWT	Map	Details	This site on the slope of the North Downs has flora-rich chalk grassland with fly, bee and pyramidal orchids. There is also woodland with ash, beech, yew and an avenue of horse chestnuts.
Hogsmill	Hogsmill	36.0 hectares (89 acres)	Ewell; 51.361°N 0.268°W; TQ 207 639	Epsom and Ewell		Map	Details	This site along the Hogsmill River and its banks has woodland, scrub and open grassy rides. Bird species include firecrests, kingfishers, fieldfares and redwings, while there are butterflies such as red admirals and peacocks.
Horton Country Park	Horton Country Park	152.3 hectares (376 acres)	Epsom; 51.351°N 0.290°W; TQ 192 627	Epsom and Ewell		Map	Details	The park has a range of habitats, including ancient woodland, grassland and ponds. There are many butterflies in summer, and other fauna such as green woodpeckers, roe deer and herons.
Inholms Clay Pit	Inholms Clay Pi	8.4 hectares (21 acres)	North Holmwood; 51.211°N 0.321°W; TQ 174 471	Mole Valley	SWT	Map	Details	This former clay quarry has young woodland and open grassland. Flora in the woods include dog's mercury and wood anemone, while the grassland has orchids such as common spotted, pyramidal and southern marsh. Bird species include siskin, buzzard and lapwing.
Lakeside Park	Lakeside Park	14.7 hectares (36 acres)	Ash; 51.258°N 0.729°W; SU 888 517	Guildford		Map	Details	The Blackwater River runs through this wetland site, which also has ponds, lakes, reed beds, an orchid meadow and wet woodland. Flora include water violet, bee orchid and ragged robin. There are bats, common blue butterflies and hairy dragonflies.
Lingfield Wildlife Area	Lingfield Wildlife Area	6.3 hectares (16 acres)	Lingfield; 51.179°N 0.017°W; TQ 387 441	Tandridge		Map	Details	This site adjoins Centenary Fields and both are managed by local volunteers. There is a wildlife area, copses, a pond, a wetland area, hedges, meadows and a skateboard ramp.
Mayford Meadows	Mayford Meadows	4.9 hectares (12 acres)	Woking; 51.297°N 0.570°W; SU 998 563	Woking		Map	Details	Management of these meadows aims to encourage wet grassland with a rich variety of flora. Species of flowering plants include cuckooflower, marsh marigold, purple loosestrife, meadowsweet and yellow water-lily.
Molesey Heath	Molesey Heath	17.8 hectares (44 acres)	Molesey; 51.392°N 0.374°W; TQ 132 671	Elmbridge		Map	Details	This site was formerly a gravel pit and then a landfill site. It has been colonised naturally by rough grassland and scrub. Fauna include burrowing bees, wasps and diverse bird species such as little ringed plovers and redshanks.
Nore Hill Pinnacle	Nore Hill Pinnacle	0.2 hectares (0.49 acres)	Warlingham; 51.300°N 0.025°W; TQ 378 575	Tandridge		Map	Details	This very small geological Local Nature Reserve is a Regionally Important Geological Site. It was previously a gravel pit and when the gravel was removed a number of natural chalk pinnacles were discovered. This is the only one which has been retained.
Ockham and Wisley	Ockham and Wisley	332.6 hectares (822 acres)	Wisley; 51.317°N 0.456°W; TQ 077 587	Guildford	SPA, SSSI, SWT	Map	Details	This site is mainly heathland but it also has areas of open water, bog, woodland and scrub. It has a rich flora and it is of national importance for true flies and for dragonflies and damselflies. Rare species include the white-faced darter dragonfly and the Thyridanthrax fenestratus bee fly.
Pewley Down	Pewley Down	9.5 hectares (23 acres)	Guildford; 51.230°N 0.558°W; TQ 008 489	Guildford		Map	Details	This chalk grassland site has several species of rare flowering plants, including six orchids. Invertebrates include 26 species of butterflies and 119 of bees, wasps and ants.
Reigate Heath	Reigate Heath	51.6 hectares (128 acres)	Reigate; 51.237°N 0.231°W; TQ 236 501	Reigate and Banstead	SM, SSSI	Map	Details	Most of the site is heath and acidic grassland, with some areas of woodland and marshy meadow. One part is a golf course. The heath is mainly ling, bell heather and wavy hair-grass. Marshy meadows have Yorkshire fog, sharp-flowered rush, meadowsweet, wild angelica and marsh marigold.
River Mole	River Mole	23.3 hectares (58 acres)	Leatherhead; 51.292°N 0.338°W; TQ 160 561	Mole Valley		Map	Details	This site consists of two stretches of the River Mole and its banks, one in Leatherhead and the other north-west of the town. It has very diverse fauna and flora.
Riverside Park	Riverside Park	61.6 hectares (152 acres)	Guildford; 51.255°N 0.561°W; TQ 005 516	Guildford		Map	Details	This wetland site has open water and reedbeds. Breeding birds include common terns, sedge warblers, reed buntings, water rails, redshanks, common snipe and lapwings.
Riverside Walk, Virginia Water	Riverside Walk, Virginia Water	21.2 hectares (52 acres)	Englefield Green; 51.399°N 0.573°W; SU 994 676	Runnymede		Map	Details	This is a woodland site along the banks of the River Bourne. The wildlife is diverse: 250 plant species have been recorded and 57 different birds. A large part of the woodland is wet, but some drier areas have oak and birch trees. Mammals include three species of deer, foxes and bats.
Rodborough Common	Rodborough Common	62.2 hectares (154 acres)	Milford; 51.166°N 0.668°W; SU 932 416	Waverley	SWT	Map	Details	Sheep and cattle were grazed on the common in the nineteenth century and it was used for military exercises in the Second World War. It has heath, woodland and acid grassland. Flora include greater stitchwort, enchanter's nightshade and germander speedwell, and there are reptiles such as grass snakes, slowworms and common lizards.
Rowhill Copse	Rowhill Copse	26.6 hectares (66 acres)	Weybourne; 51.241°N 0.778°W; SU 854 498	Waverley		Map (Note: The link to the map of Rowhill Copse does not work. This is the link to the nearby Farnham Park, which also shows Rowhill Copse.)	Details	This site is mainly coppiced woodland with hazel and sweet chestnut. There are also ponds, a stream, heath and marshland. It is the source of the River Blackwater.
Sayer's Croft	Sayer's Croft	10.9 hectares (27 acres)	Ewhurst; 51.153°N 0.453°W; TQ 083 404	Waverley		Map	Details	This nature reserve is on land belonging to Sayers Croft outdoor educational centre. It has diverse habitats, including broadleaved woodland, grassland, marsh, open water, tall herb and tall fen.
Sheepleas	Sheepleas	103.1 hectares (255 acres)	West Horsley; 51.253°N 0.441°W; TQ 089 516	Guildford	GCR, SSSI, SWT	Map	Details	This sloping site on the North Downs has woodland, scrub and botanically rich grassland. The diverse invertebrate fauna includes two nationally rare flies, Norellia spinipes and Microdon devius. A cutting in Mountain Wood exposes a unique gravel Pleistocene deposit which throws light on the Quaternary history of the Weald and the evolution of the London Basin.
Shere Woodlands	Shere Woodlands	44.0 hectares (109 acres)	East Clandon; 51.229°N 0.470°W; TQ 069 489	Guildford	SSSI, SWT	Map	Details	This site on a slope of the North Downs is mainly woodland and scrub, with a small area of unimproved chalk grassland. The woodland is dominated by beech and yew. There is a wide variety of bryophytes, including the rare moss Herzogiella seligeri.
Snaky Lane Community Wildlife Area	Snaky Lane Community Wildlife Area	2.7 hectares (6.7 acres)	Ash Vale; 51.279°N 0.730°W; SU 887 541	Guildford		Map	Details	This site is managed for wildlife by the local community. It has a variety of habitats with mature trees, grassland, scrub, hedgerows and a pond.
Staffhurst Wood, Lingfield	Staffhurst Wood, Lingfield	38.1 hectares (94 acres)	Limpsfield; 51.218°N 0.020°W; TQ 412 485	Tandridge	NCR, SSSI, SWT	Map	Details	This common on Weald Clay has been wooded since the Anglo-Saxon period and past management has left many ancient trees. The canopy is mainly pedunculate oak and the older trees support a rich lichen flora. The moth fauna is described by Natural England as outstanding, with six uncommon species.
Stokes Field	Stokes Field	5.9 hectares (15 acres)	Long Ditton; 51.379°N 0.325°W; TQ 167 658	Elmbridge		Map	Details	The field has diverse habitats with a pond, scrub, woodland and grassland. Flora include crab apple trees, cuckoo flowers and pyramidal orchid.
West End Common	West End Common	70.3 hectares (174 acres)	Esher; 51.354°N 0.389°W; TQ 123 629	Elmbridge	SSSI	Map	Details	The common has wet areas, which have the rare flowering marsh plant starfruit, woodland with ancient oak and beech trees, and grassland. More than 2,000 species of insects have been recorded.
Weybourne	Weybourne	2.4 hectares (5.9 acres)	Farnham; 51.229°N 0.778°W; SU 854 485	Waverley		Map	Details	This site has a variety of habitats, including woodland, grassland, fen and scrub.
White Rose Lane	White Rose Lane	3.4 hectares (8.4 acres)	Woking; 51.309°N 0.544°W; TQ 016 577	Woking		Map	Details	This site is damp alder woodland in two areas on the north bank of the Hoe Stream. There are several species of rare fungi and fauna include owls, bats, deer and frogs.
Whitmoor and Rickford Commons	Whitmoor Common	184.9 hectares (457 acres)	Guildford; 51.274°N 0.594°W; SU 982 537	Guildford	SPA, SSSI, SWT	Map	Details	This site on the heath of the London Basin has a variety of heathland habitats, as well as areas of woodland, meadow and still and running water. The heath has a nationally scarce spider Oxyopes heterophthalmus and beetle Hyperaspis pseudopustulata. There are also nationally important populations of several bird species.

== See also ==
- List of Sites of Special Scientific Interest in Surrey

== Sources ==
- Ratcliffe, Derek, ed. (1977). A Nature Conservation Review. Vol. 2. Cambridge, UK: Cambridge University Press. ISBN 978-0-521-21403-2.
