= Dollypers Hill =

Nature reserve in Coulsdon, London, England

Coordinates: 51.310°N 0.115°W

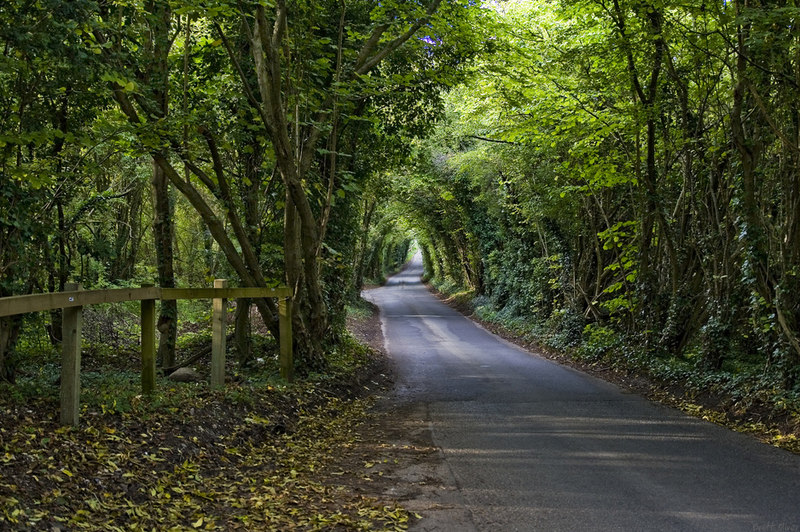
- Interactive map of Dollypers Hill
- Type: Nature reserve
- Location: Coulsdon, Croydon
- OS grid: TQ315584
- Area: 12 hectares (30 acres)
- Manager: Surrey Wildlife Trust

Dollypers Hill is a 12-hectare (30-acre) nature reserve south east of Coulsdon in the London Borough of Croydon. It is managed by the Surrey Wildlife Trust.

This urban site has ancient woodland, chalk grassland and scrub. Grassland flowering plants include grass vetchling, eyebright, kidney vetch, bird's-foot trefoil, wood anemone, quaking grass and bluebell.

There is access from Old Lodge Lane and Caterham Drive.
