= Mayford Meadows =

Nature reserve in Surrey, England

Coordinates: 51.297°N 0.570°W

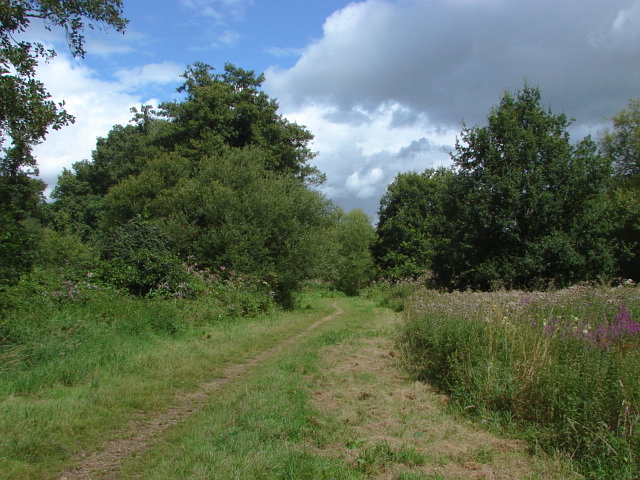
- Interactive map of Mayford Meadows
- Type: Local Nature Reserve
- Location: Woking, Surrey
- OS grid: SU 998 563
- Area: 4.9 hectares (12 acres)
- Manager: Woking Borough Council

Mayford Meadows is a 4.9-hectare (12-acre) Local Nature Reserve on the southern outskirts of Woking in Surrey. It is owned and managed by Woking Borough Council.

Management of meadows aims to encourage wet grassland with a rich variety of flora. Species of flowering plants include cuckooflower, marsh marigold, purple loosestrife, meadowsweet and yellow water-lily.

There is access from Drakes Way.
