= National Camps Corporation =

British non-profit organisation

The National Camps Corporation Ltd was a British government-funded non-profit organisation created in pursuance of Section 1 of the Camps Act 1939. The role of the corporation was as the "operative company for England and Wales." "The only functions of the Corporation in regard to the schools are the maintenance and management of the camps." Originally, the idea was that "the camps were set up for periods of temporary occupation in Summer-time." Following the declaration of World War II, it was decided that the camps would be "for permanent occupation all the year round."

== Origins ==
"In the 1930s, government ministers were worried about working class children living in cramped accommodation in polluted industrial cities."

"The original purpose of these camps was to provide holiday accommodation for city children, who would otherwise not have had the opportunity to experience the countryside and nature."

In the context of preparations for war, "in February, 1939, the then Home Secretary announced that the Government had decided to proceed with the erection of a number of camps and would entrust the work to two non-profit earning companies, one for England and Wales and the other for Scotland, and that the companies would be set up and financed by the Government.” As a result, the Camps Act. was enacted on 25 May 1939, which provided for the construction of government-financed camps for use as educational holiday centres for children during peacetime, and as camps for evacuees during war. "They were built for school camps in which to give the children a fortnight's holiday, but they are being used now during the period of the war, and the Prime Minister himself indicated that we may still be fighting in the war in 1945."

"The real purpose of the camps was that in peace time they should be school camps for children during the major part of the year and used for adults in the winter months, and, in time of war, for refugees.”

It was intended that "approximately 50 camps, of which seven will be in Scotland and the remainder in England and Wales, shall be built as a supplement to the accommodation available for evacuation from the more vulnerable areas."

The Camps Act 1939 prompted the creation of the National Camps Corporation to oversee these camps "to be used as school camps in peacetime and as evacuation camps in time of war." "Under the Articles of Association, the National Camps Corporation, which was set up under the Camps Act, 1939, is managed by a Council, the membership of which is subject to...approval." In March 1939, Lord Portal was announced as the chairman of the company for England and Wales.

The Camps Act provided "a sum of £1,200,000, for the construction, maintenance and management of the camps. The share of England and Wales was £1,032,000" half of which was as a loan.

In England and Wales, "Thirty-one camps have been erected; one of these is occupied by an evacuated orphanage, the others, with one exception, are occupied by local education authorities of vulnerable areas for occupation by school children, together with the necessary teachers and staff."

== Construction of the camps ==
The government's expectation was that the corporation would construct fifty camps, but in reality, only 31 were built in England and Wales, with a further five in Scotland. The cessation of the construction of new camps was mainly due to the increased costs as a result of war, and the realisation that such camps were not a completely adequate solution to the problem of evacuation. The Corporation "considered 155 sites for camps, all of which have been personally inspected by either the chairman or the managing director" of the National Camps Corporation.

However, some of these sites were taken by the Royal Air Force before the corporation could decide on them. The design of each camp was similar, consisting of huts made out of Canadian cedarwood, designed by architect Thomas Smith Tait of Messrs. Sir John Burnet Tait and Lone. "Each camp has been designed to accommodate about 350 children and 13 teachers in peacetime, but the camps are so laid out that they can be doubled if necessary in an emergency."

All camps had a "dining hall, kitchen block, assembly hall, class block and hospital with seven beds, dispensary, and other necessary amenities. There is domestic staff accommodation, and quarters for transport. There is a bungalow and a boiler house." All camps were "centrally heated. It is a magnificent system of central heating which would be greatly appreciated by many people in this country in the present weather. They are suitable for occupation during the winter months, and even during the coldest winter months. There is electric light. There are four classrooms for teaching purposes, and there is, in addition, a large dining-hall capable of seating 400 persons, which can also be used for the purpose of teaching, if necessary. There are six dormitories capable of taking, in double-decker beds, 58 children."

Each camp had "a static water tank, required by law as a defence against incendiary attacks."

"With the arrival of war, certain of the expenses increased. The cost of materials and of labour has been much heavier for the later camps than for the camps which were started before the war. Again, with the arrival of war, we had to reconsider the use to which these camps would be put. When the decision was taken that they should become residential schools, and be occupied by school children throughout the year, we had to add extra class rooms, a sick bay, and make other provisions for caring for the children during the winter months. For these reasons, the capital cost has increased."

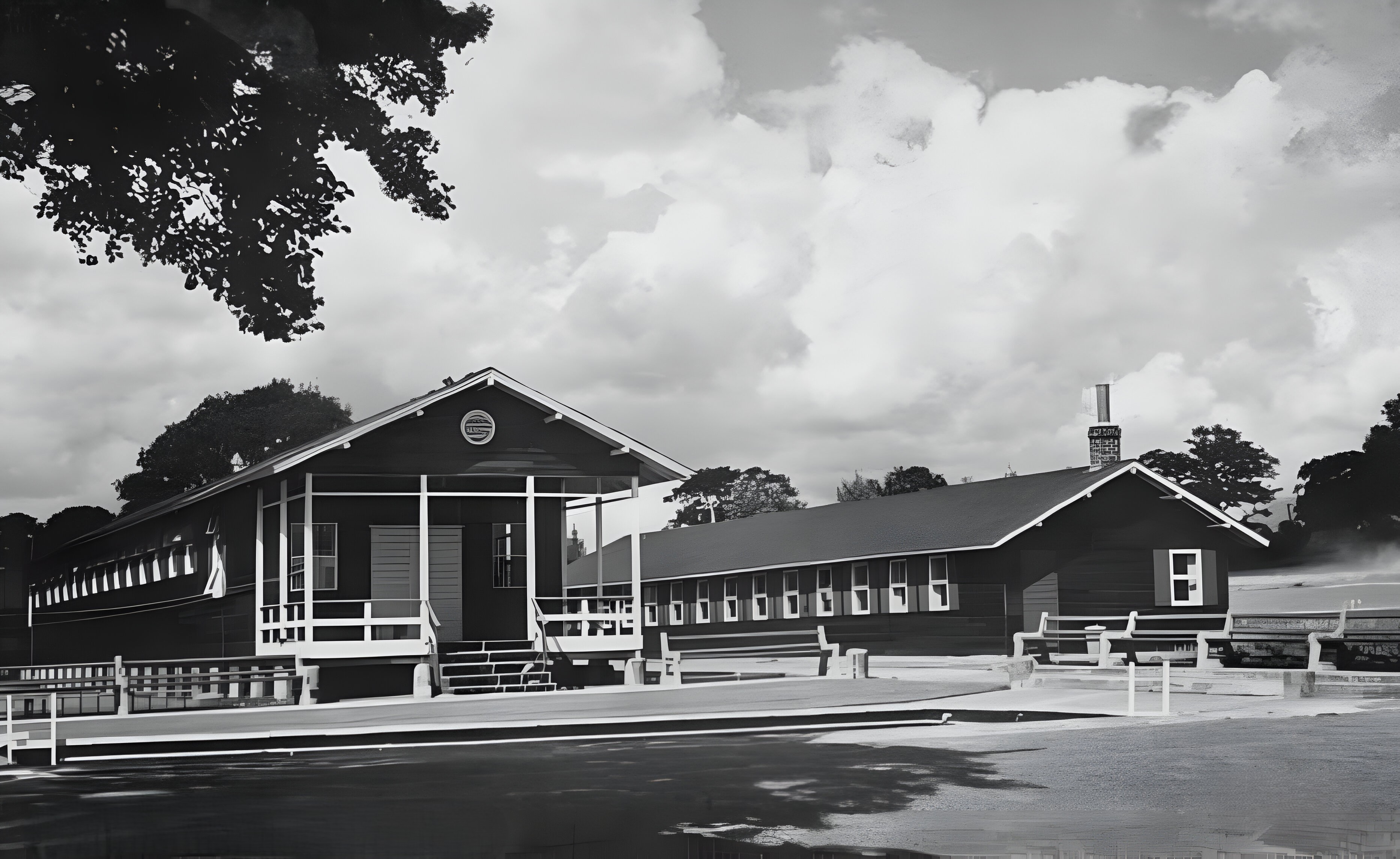

"The Corporation, within the limits of its capital, was compelled to restrict the scope of its building owing to higher costs. The costs had been sent up owing to the fact that the Militia camps which were being constructed by the Government had been built on a cost plus profit basis, with the usual disastrous results. In the case of one of their camps, constructed under competitive tender, 8o workmen were enticed away to Government work for which double the normal wage was offered."

The average cost of each camp was in the region of £25,000.

== Wartime and post-war use ==
During the World War II, these camps were used as schools for evacuated children, run by local education authorities. "Many of the children come from London schools, but there are also children from Birmingham, Manchester, Liverpool, Coventry, Bradford, Leeds, Newcastle, Hull, Portsmouth, Southampton and a few other places." Some modifications were required for this purpose, as the camps had been intended for temporary holiday guests, rather than a semi-permanent population. This had the obvious consequence of reducing the number of evacuees who could be housed at such camps to under 9,000 nationally. Nevertheless, in November 1940, the Minister of Health, Malcolm MacDonald, described the camps as "one of the most significant pieces of work to which Parliament has lent its hand in recent times."

"Not only are the children in these camps more secure against the evil acts of the Nazi airmen and safer from their bombs, but they have gained other permanent benefits. The fresh natural air of the countryside has made them more healthy; contact with Nature has broadened the minds and refreshed the spirits of town children. They are healthier and better educated than they were before."

"The first [camp] to be occupied was that at Kennylands, near Reading, of which the boys' side of Beal Central School, Ilford, took possession in February [1940]. "On the 30th of September 1940, Kennylands camp had a visit from the Royal family and even Lord Haw Haw; the German propaganda broadcaster got wind of the camp, making remarks about the poor quality of the fish the children were eating there. The school ran extremely well over the war years, and even much past that.

On 12 June 1945, a further Camps Act was enacted so that “the powers and duties of the Minister of Health under the Camps Act, 1939, shall be transferred to the Minister of Education.”

In the decades following the war, most of these camps were sold to county councils and education authorities for use as schools. In 1948, it was reported that "30 out of 31 [camps] are being used by school children, and being used for 11 months of the year."

On 22 September 1955, the Ministry of Education appointed a Receiver for the National Camp Corporation Ltd, when it went into liquidation.

Of special interest is Amber Valley Camp in Derbyshire, used by Derby School, starting in June 1940 on completion. The boys and masters having previously been located at Overton Hall, near Ashover, where they were all moved on Saturday, 2 September by Derby Corporation petrol engine buses. Amber Valley Camp was used for several years by Derby Corporation for children/pupils living in Derby to enjoy the freedom of a very rural countryside for one month at a time. The valley where most of the dormitories, toilet facilities, meeting room, classrooms, laboratories, accommodation for the site warden and one master and his family had to be demolished when Severn Trent Water Authority flooded the whole valley to create Ogston Reservoir. The one remaining large building at the top of the valley is now occupied by the Ogston Sailing Club, where they have their clubroom, changing facilities, kitchen and bar. This large building had been used from 1940 to 1945 as the main school dining room, 'tuck shop' and masters' (teachers) common room. Built of cedarwood in 1940, the building is still as sound as originally. Most years it hosts a special school reunion of former school pupils who attended Derby School during the years of World War II.

Also, in 2007, English Heritage listed Sayers Croft's dining hall and kitchen block as Grade II listed buildings for their exceptional level of survival, as of the nine camps that still exist today, only the plan of Sayers Croft reflects Thomas Smith Tait's original intentions.

== List of 31 National Camps Corporation sites ==
	Name	Location	Initial authority (WW2)	Users after sale/lease	Subsequent uses	Current status
1	Bewerley Park Camp School	Pateley Bridge, Harrogate, North Yorkshire	Leeds	1964, North Yorkshire County Council	1964, Bewerley Park Centre For Outdoor Education	Outdoor centre
2	Bishopswood Farm Camp School	Sonning Common, Reading, Berkshire				Derilict/Disused
3	Brownrigg Camp School	Bellingham, Northumberland	Newcastle	1945, Northumberland Education Committee	Mixed boarding school. Closed in 1985. Later, it was used as a horse riding school. And then it was used as the setting for a prisoner of war camp spoof TV drama called ‘Stalag Luft’	The site was subsequently divided to create the Bellingham Camping and Caravanning Club Site and a private dwelling known as School Masters House. 2017, this was developed as self-catering holiday accommodation
4	Cockpole Green Camp School	Reading, Berkshire				
5	Colomendy Camp School	Loggerheads, Mold, Denbighshire	Liverpool	1956, Liverpool Corporation	Residential secondary school 2013, an outdoor pursuits centre	Disused/Dereleict 2025, Liverpool City Council took over the outdoor education centre, after its tenant ceased trading
6	Coopers Farm Camp School	Itchingfield, Horsham, West Sussex				
8	Derby School, Amber Valley Camp	Woolley Moor, Ashover, Alfreton, Derbyshire	Derby	1945, Derby Corporation	Derby Corporation Education Committee provided monthly visits by the town's secondary school children. Closed in 1958	Valley flooded by Severn Trent Water. Dining room, tuck shop and Masters' common room remained and have been used by Ogston Sailing Club since 2018
9	Dukeshouse Wood Camp School	Hexham, Northumbria	Gateshead	Gateshead Education Authority as an outdoor centre	Residential School	January 2025, residential and activity centre went into liquidation
10	Elmbridge Camp School	Cranleigh, Horsham, Sussex	Ilford, Essex	1947, Essex County Council	Secondary boarding school	Sheltered housing for the elderly
7	Etton Camp (Cottage Pasture) School	Etton, Beverley, East Riding of Yorkshire		1952, Boarding Special School, Closed in 1990	South Wolds School for children with emotional and behavioural problems. Closed in 2003	Derelict/Disused
11	Finnamore Wood Camp (for Girls)	Marlow, Buckinghamshire	Ilford, London	1961, Home Office	HM Prison Finnamore Wood. Closed in 1996	Derelict/Disused
12	Hurley Camp School	Berkshire				
13	Hydon Heath Camp School	Essex				
14	Kennylands Camp School	Kidmore End, Sonning Common, Oxfordshire	Ilford, London	Essex County Council	Mixed summer boarding school. Later, becoming Kennylands School, a state-run boarding school. Closed in 1980	Converted into a residential care home in the 1980s
15	Linton Camp School	Linton, Grassington, North Yorkshire	Bradford & Leeds	1957, City of Bradford Metropolitan District Council	Special residential school. Closed in 1986. It was then periodically used as summer camps for scout groups	Derelict/Disused 2019, awaiting redevelopment into a luxury hotel 2024, planning approved under delegated powers
19	Lordsfield Camp School	Overton, Hampshire	Southampton	Middlesex County Council	Used for delicate and maladjusted children	Overton junior school. A new modern building eventually replaced the huts
16	Marton Camp School	Whitegate, Northwich, Cheshire	Liverpool	1955, Northumberland County Council	Mixed residential secondary modern school. Closed in 1976	Housing estate
17	Marchant's Hill Camp School	Hindhead, Surrey	East Ham, London	London County Council	Outdoor camp for young people	Outdoor adventure activity centre
18	Merstham Camp School	Merstham, Reigate, Surrey				
20	Oxford Camp School	Henley-on-Thanes, Oxfordshire				
21	Pipewood Camp School, (for Girls)	Blithbury, Rugeley, Staffordshire	Birmingham	1945, Nottingham Education Committee	Educational holiday camp	Demolished
22	Sayers Croft Camp School	Ewhurst, Surrey	Catford	1946, Greater London Council	After the war, the camp was used to rehabilitate Dutch children following the Nazi occupation of the Netherlands. Then, it became a rural studies centre	Sayers Croft Field Centre, an educational outdoor centre
23	Sheephatch Camp School	Tilford, Surrey	Leytonstone	1946, Surrey County Council	Mixed educational boarding school	Owned by Ahmadiyya Muslim Association
24	Shooting Butts Camp School (for boys)	Penkridge Bank Road, Rugeley, Staffordshire	Birmingham		Outdoor centre	Many of the huts were demolished after falling into disrepair, but a few buildings remain
25	St. Margaret's Farm Camp School	Great Gaddesden, Berkhamsted, Hertfordshire	London	1957, Bedfordshire County Council Education Department	Residential school for special needs children	1984, the land and premises were sold to the Amavarati Buddhists and became a monastery or temple
26	Stokenchurch Camp School	Horsleys Green, Buckinghamshire	Disabled children	1947, Lancashire Education Committee	Horsleys Green School. Closed in 1971 Wycliffe Bible Translators. Closed in 2018	Redeveloped for a retirement / assisted living complex
27	Wedges Farm Camp School	Itchingfield, Horsham, West Sussex		1946, West Sussex & Hampshire County Councils	A special school for the provision of education . Closed in 1956.	
28	West Mark Camp School	Sheet, Petersfield, Hampshire	Portsmouth			
29	Whiteacre Camp School	Barrow, Clitheroe, Lancashire	Salford	1945, Lancashire Education Committee	1963, Residential secondary boarding school. Closed in 1980	1988, redeveloped into an over-55's residential complex called Green Park Court Apartments
30	Wrens Warren Camp School	Coleman's Hatch, Hartfield, East Sussex	Medway		The site of the camp became a dogs & cats home in the 1970s	Pulled down to make way for luxury housing in the 1990s
31	Wyre Farm Camp School	Cleobury Mortimer, Kidderminster, Worcestershire	Coventry	1957, City of Coventry Council	1957, Secondary modern comprehensive boarding school. Closed in 1982	1984, Youth for Christ residential centre 1991, Northamptonshire Association of Youth Clubs, Pioneer Centre
