= Stokes Field =

Coordinates: 51.379°N 0.325°W

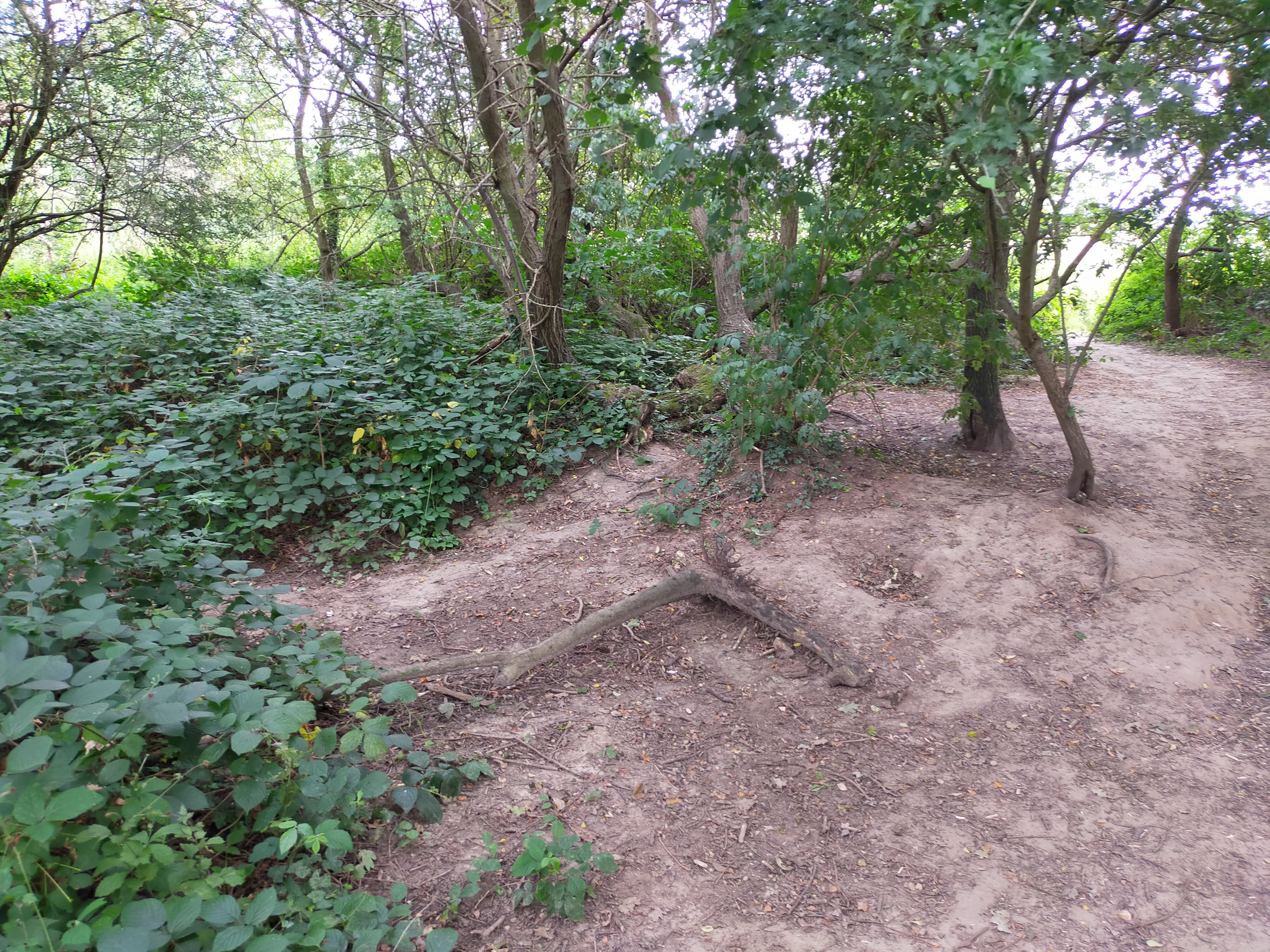
- Interactive map of Stokes Field
- Type: Local Nature Reserve
- Location: Long Ditton, Surrey
- OS grid: SU 854 498
- Area: 5.9 hectares (15 acres)
- Manager: Elmbridge Borough Council

Stokes Field is a 5.9-hectare (15-acre) Local Nature Reserve in Long Ditton in Surrey. It is owned and managed by Elmbridge Borough Council.

The field has diverse habitats with a pond, scrubland, woodland and grassland. Flora include crab apple trees, cuckoo flowers, pyramidal orchid, blackberries, and rosehip.

There is access from Sugden Road.

== Gallery ==
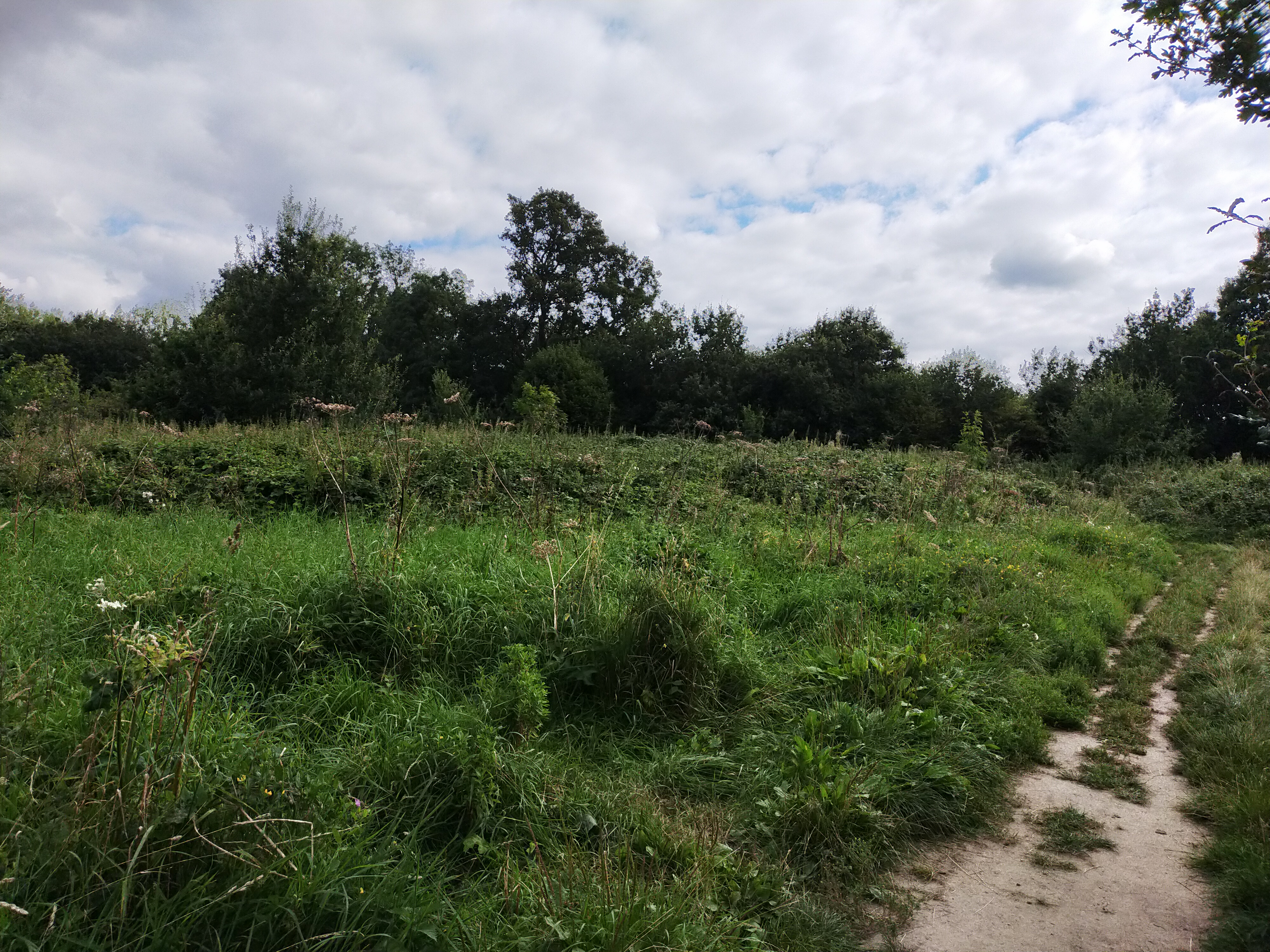
A grassy area in Stokes Field

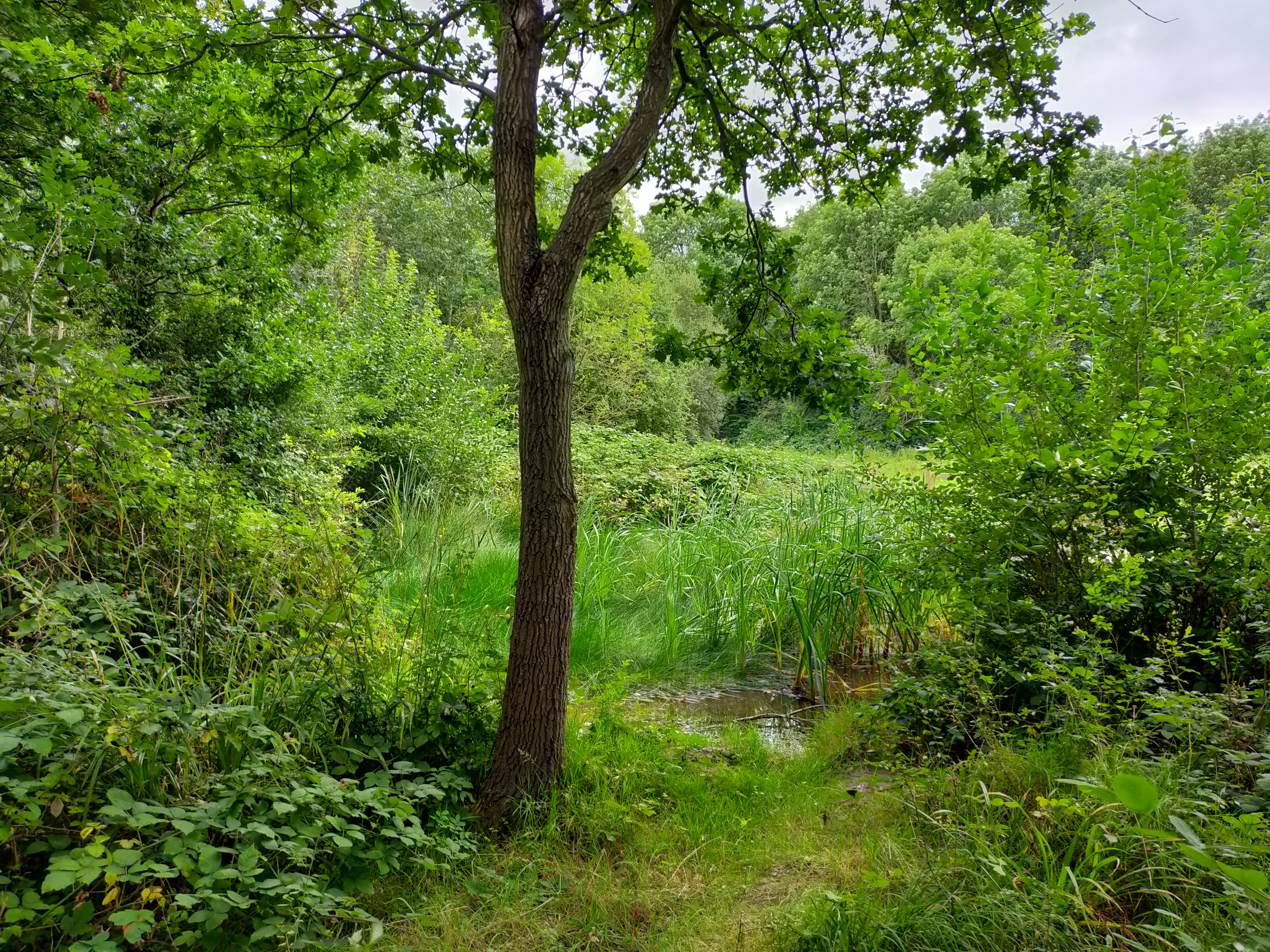
A pond in Stokes Field

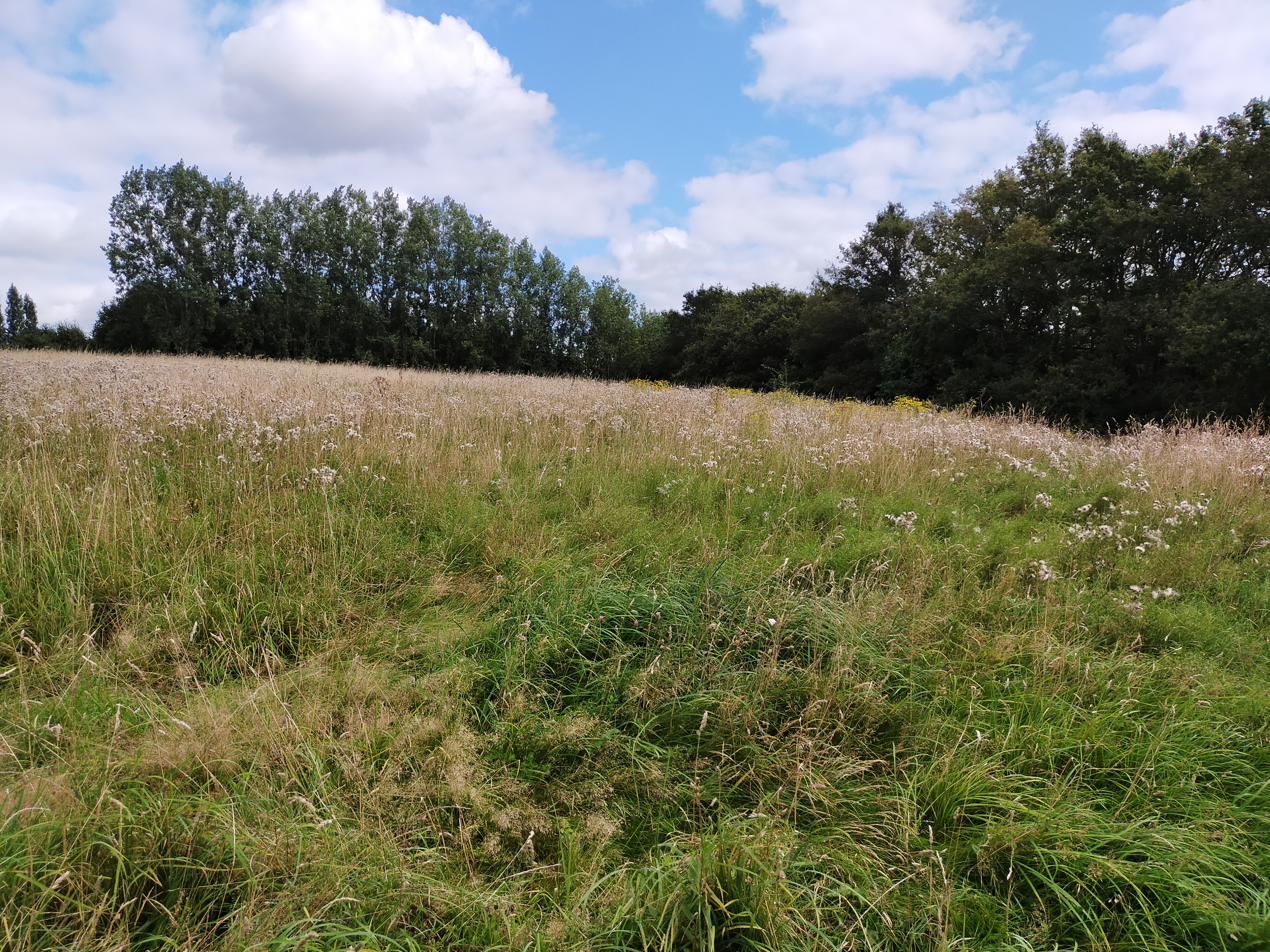
A hill in Stokes Field
