= Fox Corner Wildlife Area =

Nature reserve in Surrey, England

Coordinates: 51.282°N 0.624°W

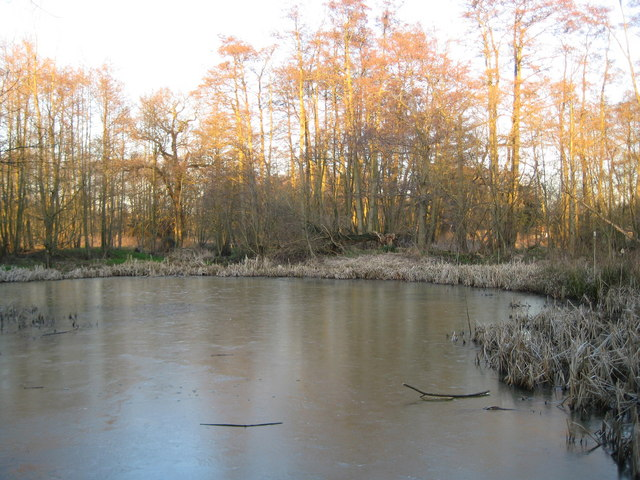
- Interactive map of Fox Corner Wildlife Area
- Type: Local Nature Reserve
- Location: Woking, Surrey
- OS grid: SU 961 545
- Area: 6.2 hectares (15 acres)
- Manager: Guildford Borough Council

Fox Corner Wildlife Area is a 6.2-hectare (15-acre) Local Nature Reserve south-west of Woking in Surrey. It is owned and managed by Guildford Borough Council.

The wildlife area was created in 1990 following compulsory purchase of the site. It has woods, a wildflower meadow and a pond. There are birds such as the great spotted woodpecker, small tortoiseshell and comma butterflies, while flowering plants include grass vetchling and meadowsweet.

There is access from Heath Mill Lane.
