= Lingfield Wildlife Area =

Nature reserve in Surrey, England

Coordinates: 51.179°N 0.017°W

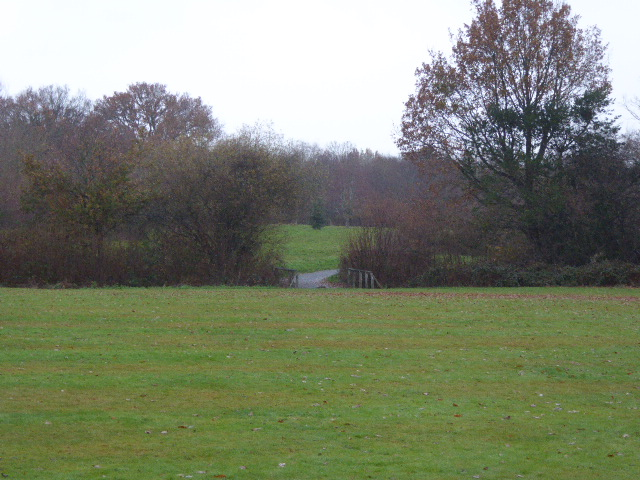
- Interactive map of Lingfield Wildlife Area
- Type: Local Nature Reserve
- Location: Lingfield, Surrey
- OS grid: TQ 387 441
- Area: 6.3 hectares (16 acres)
- Manager: Lingfield Wildlife Area Committee

Lingfield Wildlife Area is a 6.3-hectare (16-acre) Local Nature Reserve in Lingfield in Surrey. It is owned by Tandridge District Council and managed by the Lingfield Wildlife Area Committee.

This site adjoins Centenary Fields and both are managed by local volunteers. There is a wildlife area, copses, a pond, a wetland area, hedges, meadows and a skateboard ramp.

There is access from Saxbys Lane.
