= HM Prison Finnamore Wood =

Prison in Buckinghamshire, England

HMYOI Finnamore Wood
- Location: Marlow, Buckinghamshire
- Security class: Young offenders Institution
- Capacity: 116
- Opened: 1961
- Closed: 1996
- Former name: Finnamore Wood Borstal
- Managed by: HM Prison Service
- Governor: David Wilson 1986–1988

HMYOI Finnamore Wood, formerly known as HMYCC Finnamore Wood or Finnamore Wood Borstal, was an open prison located 1 km North of the town of Marlow, Buckinghamshire, England. The prison was operated by His Majesty's Prison Service.

== History ==
HMYOI Finnamore Wood was opened in 1961 as a Buckinghamshire open prison for young offenders (18- to 21-year-old males) serving their last 2–3 months before release. The camp was opened as a satellite camp for Feltham Borstal and later used as an annexe to HM Prison Huntercombe. The size and role of the camp meant that it was governed on a day-to-day basis by an Assistant Governor who lived on site in the Governor's Quarter.

Situated in one of the most rural areas of Marlow, Buckinghamshire on the site of the former Evacuation Camp, and known as 'Finnamore Wood Holiday & Evacuation Camp', he site was used for housing evacuees from Beal Modern Girls' School along with refugees during the Second World War.

In 1948 the camp was used to house members of the American Canoe team who used Marlow Rowing Club as a training base for their Olympic Rowers.

Shortly after, the site was used again as a holiday camp during the 1950s, owned by a company named National Camps Corporation. It was bought by the Home Office in 1960.

When the camp closed in 1996, all inmates were transferred to Huntercombe YOI near Henley on Thames, which is still operational as a prison. The institute had been threatened with closure six years earlier in 1990 but the Home Office decided to keep it open.

David Wilson (criminologist) was the Assistant Governor at Finnamore Wood Borstal between 1986 and 1988 and is now Professor Emeritus of Criminology at Birmingham City University.

=== A War Evacuation Camp ===
Sourced from Redbridge Local Studies – Demonstrating Evacuees Arriving at Finnamore Wood 1940

Finnamore Wood was the site of the first of the government's elementary camp schools built under the Camps Act which was passed in April 1939. A further 30 constructed camps followed. The Act prompted the creation of the National Camps Corporation to oversee these camps.

On 22 April 1940 some pupils from Beal Modern Girls' School arrived at their wartime evacuation school, Finnamore Wood Camp. Many girls spent nearly four years at Finnamore Wood before it was safe to return to London.

== The prison's resources ==
Inmates were introduced back into the community from Finnamore Wood, where many used to have jobs in the local towns and farms. The camp consisted of an Educational Institute offering social skills courses along with a computer lab, classes in cooking in the camps Dining Hall and Kitchens, and the site also concentrated on sports recreation, with a remedial gymnasium/sports hall and a large playing field.

Inmates were assigned jobs for the short period of time that they spent at Finnamore Wood. These jobs included gardening and greenhouse work, carpentry and plumbing.

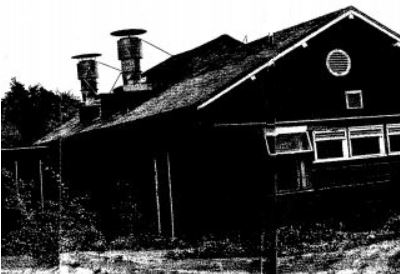
Camp Kitchen Exterior

Inmates slept in long dormitories without locks on the main doors (apart from normal household latches) and each inmate had their own key for their respective room. Each room had no ceiling and was open on all sides, to aid access by officers in case of barricades. Windows weren't covered with bars but instead a metal mesh.

=== Worship ===
There was no chapel within the grounds of the camp. The boys attended Frieth Church on Sundays.

== The Camp Grounds ==
Layout when in use as HMYCC.

The camps buildings were mainly made from wood with brick foundations, apart from the Dining Hall which had brick chimneys and metal smoke outlets. The camp contained four cell blocks each unit with a communal bathroom. Other buildings on the site, a shower block, library, first aid centre, gardeners workshop, a carpenters workshop, plumbing workshop, education building and art studios and also a visits room.

=== Staff and Wardens ===
Some prison staff lived off site and travelled to work at Finnamore Wood. Others lived within the grounds in staff accommodation. The Assistant Governor in charge lived on site in the Governor's quarter. A bar and social club was also on site for the residential staff and wardens.

== Incidents ==
On 16 October 1992 some young prisoners from Finnamore Wood fought with their guards as they were passing through Henley-on-Thames. The guards contacted the local Police to attend and quell the riot as the wardens feared the situation could have erupted further. The vehicle was diverted to Henley Police Station.

Inmates were being transferred to Huntercombe young offenders unit when the incident took place.

Rioting in the prison was minimal and the security was fairly relaxed compared to the life behind bars that inmates would have previously experienced.

== The site today ==
Finnamore Wood Main Entrance 2013

Before the prison closed, some plans to enlarge the capacity of HMYOI Finnamore Wood to enable it to accommodate adult inmates were being discussed. However after the proposition fell through, the prison camp was sold off and the wardens houses are now privately owned. There is currently a planning application awaiting decision for five houses. The land has been purchased, and signage erected on most of the buildings display warnings of the hazardous building material Asbestos.

Up until its demolition in 2023, the derelict prison cell blocks fell into extreme disrepair and the dining hall roof collapsed along with the shower block in early 2013.

The site was secured with high wooden hoarding along with signs erected stating Guard Dogs and Barbed Wire being present on the inside.

On 6 May 2020, a fire broke out on the site and one of the former prison camps buildings was damaged by the fire.

In January 2023 the demolition team started work dismantling the site.

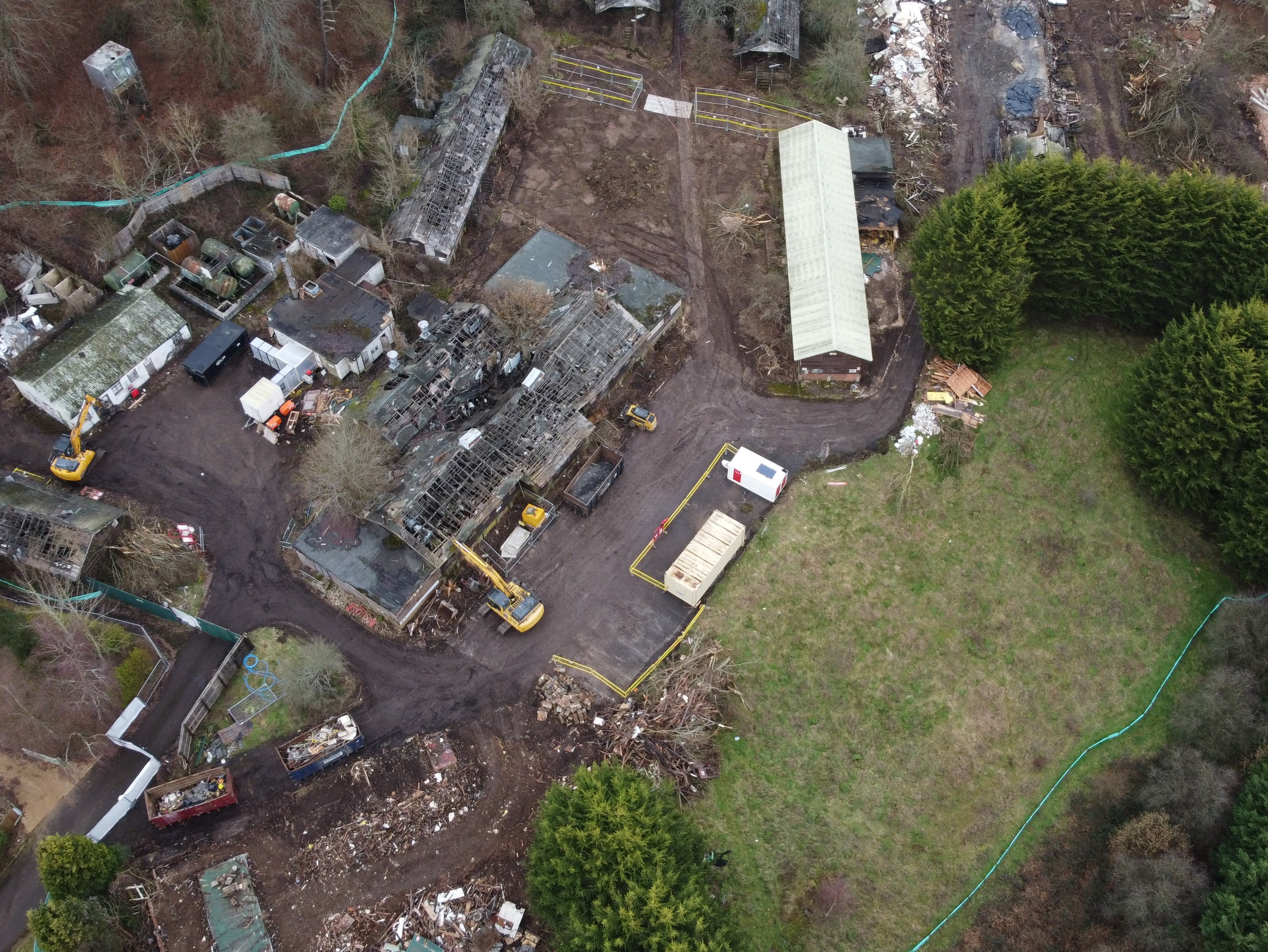
Demolition 2023

Once the site is cleared building work will commence to build five substantial houses on the site.
