= Claygate Common =

Local Nature Reserve in Surrey, England

Coordinates: 51.354°N 0.336°W

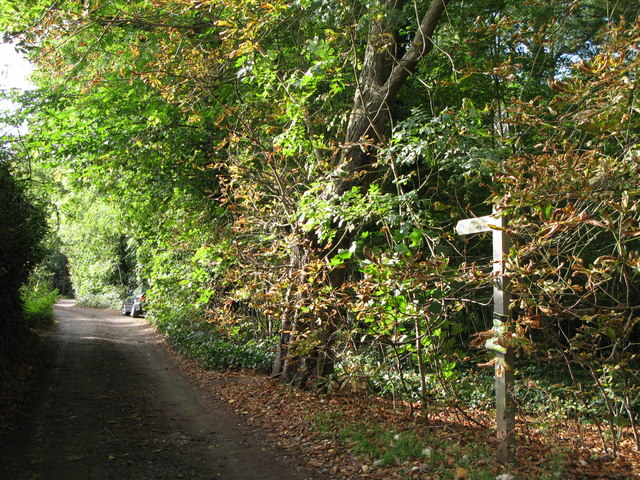
- Interactive map of Claygate Common
- Type: Local Nature Reserve
- Location: Esher, Surrey
- OS grid: TQ 160 630
- Area: 14.1 hectares (35 acres)
- Manager: Elmbridge Borough Council

Claygate Common is a 14.1-hectare (35-acre) Local Nature Reserve south-east of Esher in Surrey. It is owned and managed by Elmbridge Borough Council.

The common is woodland with oak, beech and hornbeam. It has birds such as kestrels, green woodpeckers and sparrowhawks.
