= White Rose Lane =

Nature reserve

Coordinates: 51.309°N 0.544°W

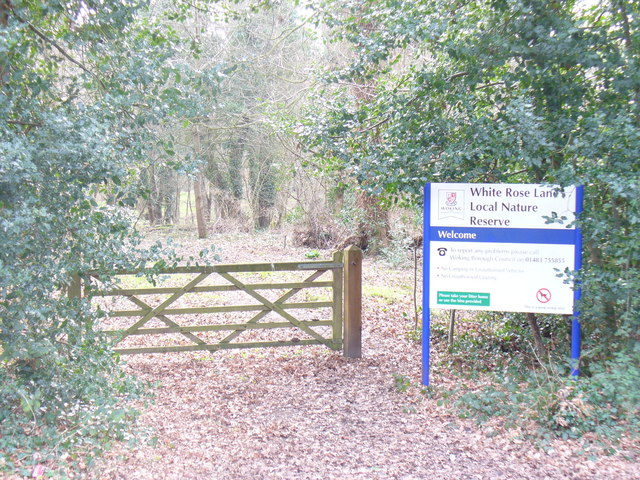
- Interactive map of White Rose Lane
- Type: Local Nature Reserve
- Location: Woking, Surrey
- OS grid: TQ 016 577
- Area: 3.4 hectares (8.4 acres)
- Manager: Woking Borough Council

White Rose Lane is a 3.4-hectare (8.4-acre) Local Nature Reserve in Woking in Surrey. It is owned and managed by Woking Borough Council.

This site is damp alder woodland in two areas on the north bank of the Hoe Stream. There are several species of rare fungi and fauna include owls, bats, deer and frogs.

There is access from the road called White Rose Lane.
