= Edolph's Copse =

Nature reserve in Surrey, England

Coordinates: 51.167°N 0.235°W

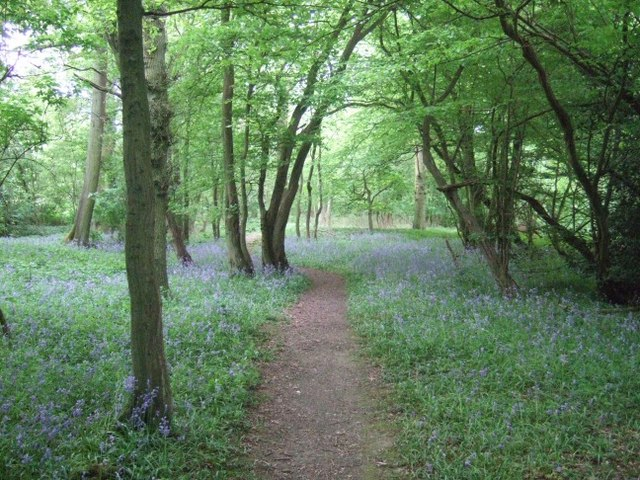
- Interactive map of Edolph's Copse
- Type: Local Nature Reserve
- Location: Horley, Surrey
- OS grid: TQ 235 423
- Area: 27.6 hectares (68 acres)
- Manager: Woodland Trust

Edolph's Copse is a 27.6-hectare (68-acre) Local Nature Reserve west of Horley in Surrey. It is owned and managed by the Woodland Trust.

The copse is mainly secondary woodland but it has areas of ancient forest. The main trees are oak, hazel and hornbeam, with a few crab apples and hawthorns, together with a large wild service tree. There are also several ponds and some grassland.
