= Sayers Croft =

Coordinates: 51.153°N 0.453°W

Sayers Croft is a large outdoor 'learning camp' located in the village of Ewhurst, Surrey. It is one of the few remaining 'Camp schools' built by the National Camps Corporation in 1939 to provide fresh air and fun activities for inner city children and offer a refuge for civilian evacuees in the event of war breaking out.

The first occupants of the centre were children from Catford Central and Browhill schools in East London who arrived in May 1940, as the construction work was being completed. The boys, supplemented from other schools as World War II continued, lived at the Centre throughout the war.

After the war, the centre was used to rehabilitate Dutch children following the Nazi occupation of the Netherlands. Sayers Croft began taking groups of children from London on residential visits. The National Camps Corporation was not a success, its assets were subsequently transferred to local authorities. The Centre transferred to the Greater London Council, and was run until 1990 by the Inner London Education Authority. Ownership was later transferred to Westminster City Council, who still run the centre.

In 1996, The Sayers Croft Trust was established as an independent charity with the aim of involving the local community, especially young people, in the enjoyment and care of the environment. By working in partnership with the Sayers Croft field centre, the Trust aims to make all the facilities of Sayers Croft available to those who may otherwise be unable to access them due to physical, financial or social disadvantage. Sayer's Croft nature reserve on land owned by the centre is a Local Nature Reserve.

Over half a million people have visited Sayers Croft. The centre hosts 12,000 visitors annually, from a variety of sources. There is a day visit programme for local schools and a community programme that targets disadvantaged young people. Sayers Croft provides a wide range of opportunities for first hand outdoor learning in a safe environment.

== History ==
=== Early history ===
Sayers Croft is situated on Wealden clay, to the South of the Greensand Ridge. The area is not suitable for agriculture, and so has remained heavily wooded. The Romans built Stane street across the Weald to link Chichester (Noviomagus Reginorum) on the South coast with London and a branch from this principal highway crosses Sayers Croft on its way to the Romano-Celtic temple at Farley Green.

The earliest historical reference to Sayers Croft is in an indenture dated 20 August 1552, which records the sale by Sir Edward Bray, knight, to John Dandy, cowman of Sayers Croft, 3 acres of land for the sum of £8. This document mentions Parsons Wood and also the 'poor field' which is located on the North West Boundary of Sayers Croft Centre and which was purchased and incorporated into the Sayers Croft Local Nature Reserve in 2003. A croft is a small building or small holding and it is likely that the word Sayers is derived from 'Sawyer' a man who cut wood

=== The Camps Act 1939 ===
The bombing of the Basque town of Guernica in Spain by planes of the German Luftwaffe's Condor Legion in 1937 made politicians realise the potential for destruction in British cities should another war with Germany break out in Europe. As tensions continued to grow, a bill was presented to the British parliament in March 1939 to promote and facilitate the construction, maintenance and management of camps of a permanent character". The Bill provided funds for compulsory land purchase and an exemption from Planning restrictions. The camps were to be constructed and administered by the National Camps Corporation, a non-profit making body set up under the Act. A Government letter in 1939 states "I am directed by the Minister of Health to refer to the permanent camps now being erected in England and Wales under the provisions of the Camps Act and to say that he has under consideration the question of whether they should be marked in some distinctive manner to indicate that they are civilian camps, so as to avoid bombing by hostile aircraft in the event of war. In peacetime it is the intention to use these camps as school camps but in time of war they should provide accommodation for some of the civil population evacuated from urban areas" The Camps were to be in quiet attractive, wooded country, so that they would be less obvious from the air, and were not to be built near military or naval establishments, aerodromes or main railway lines. Access was to be good and it would be advantageous to be near a town or village to facilitate catering. Less than three months after the Camps Bill, on 19 June, work started on the first camp at Overton in Hampshire. It was scheduled to be finished on 31 August but was eventually completed in October. Construction at nineteen other sites began and in reply to a House of Commons question on Tuesday 3 October it was stated "construction is in hand". All of the Camps were to be built from Canadian Cedarwood to standard plans and specification. The architects used were Messrs. Sir John Burnet, Tait and Larne of Montagu place, London. The actual designs were made by the modernist architect Thomas S Tait. Each Camp was to accommodate "348 children in six dormitories, together with a hall, a very large dining room with kitchens attached, 4 classrooms, a hospital block for 7 patients and quarters for camp staff, the camp superintendent, and the Headmaster". The total cost of building Sayers Croft was £25,968 comprising construction £14,111, services £8,292, site purchase £1,500, legal fees £15, equipment £1,750 and architects fees of £300.
