= Snaky Lane Community Wildlife Area =

Nature reserve in Surrey, England

Coordinates: 51.279°N 0.730°W

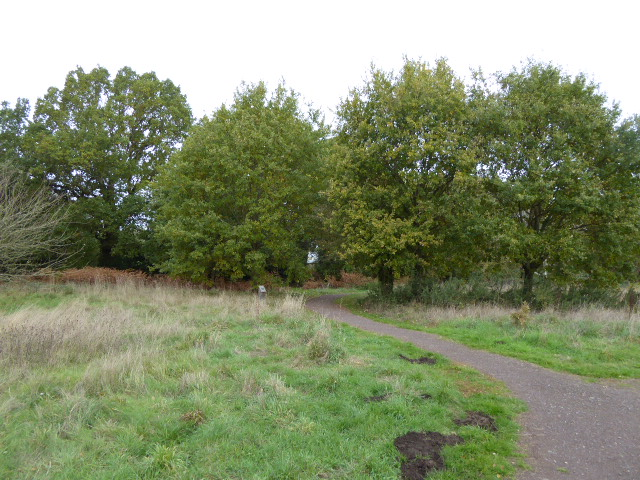
- Interactive map of Snaky Lane Community Wildlife Area
- Type: Local Nature Reserve
- Location: Ash Vale, Surrey
- OS grid: SU 887 541
- Area: 2.7 hectares (6.7 acres)
- Manager: Snaky Lane Community Wildlife Group

Snaky Lane Community Wildlife Area is a 2.7-hectare (6.7-acre) Local Nature Reserve Surrey. It is owned by Guildford Borough Council and managed by the Snaky Lane Community Wildlife Group.

This site is managed for wildlife by the local community. It has a variety of habitats with mature trees, grassland, scrub, hedgerows and a pond.

There is access from Stratford Road
