= Sayer's Croft LNR =

Nature reserve in Surrey, England

Coordinates: 51.153°N 0.453°W

Sayer's Croft
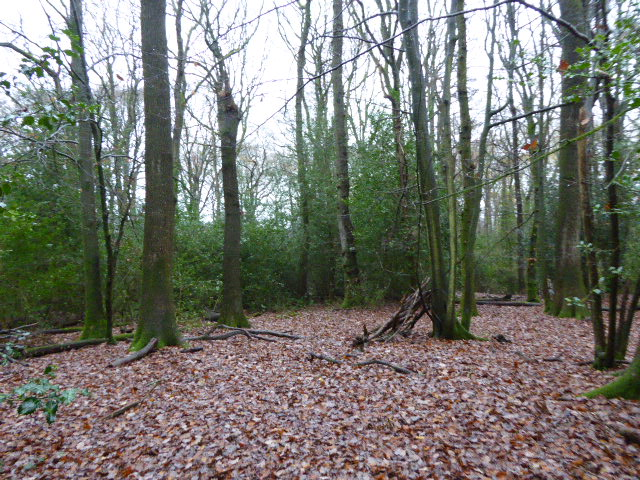
- Interactive map of Sayer's Croft
- Type: Local Nature Reserve
- Location: Ewhurst, Surrey
- OS grid: TQ 083 404
- Area: 10.9 hectares (27 acres)
- Manager: Surrey County Council

Sayer's Croft is a 10.9-hectare (27-acre) Local Nature Reserve west of Ewhurst in Surrey. It is owned by the Sayer's Croft Environmental Education Trust and managed by Surrey County Council.

This nature reserve is on land belonging to Sayers Croft outdoor educational centre. It has diverse habitats, including broadleaved woodland, grassland, marsh, open water, tall herb and tall fen.

There is access by a footpath from The Street and from the Sayers Croft Centre of Cranleigh Road.
