= Nore Hill Pinnacle =

Local nature reserve in Surrey, England

Coordinates: 51.300°N 0.025°W

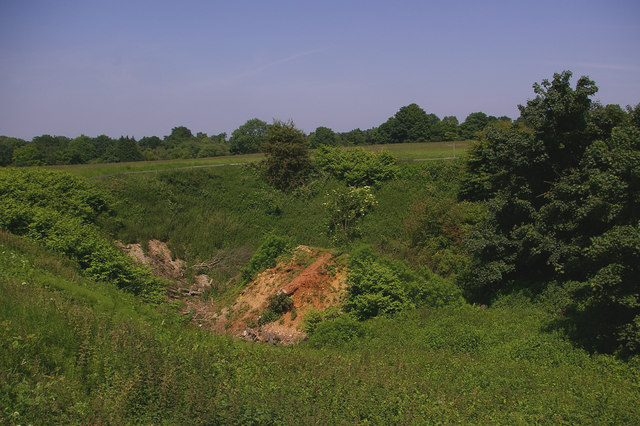
- Interactive map of Nore Hill Pinnacle
- Type: Local Nature Reserve
- Location: Warlingham, Surrey
- OS grid: TQ 378 575
- Area: 0.2 hectares (0.49 acres)

Nore Hill Pinnacle is a 0.2-hectare (0.49-acre) local nature reserve east of Warlingham in Surrey, England. It is owned by the Earl Compton Estate and was formerly managed by the Surrey Wildlife Trust, but as of 2018 is not listed on the Trust's website.

This very small geological Local Nature Reserve is a Regionally Important Geological Site. It was previously a gravel pit and when the gravel was removed a number of natural chalk pinnacles were discovered. This is the only one which has been retained.

There is public access to the site.
