= Inholms Clay Pit =

Nature reserve in Surrey, England

Coordinates: 51.211°N 0.321°W

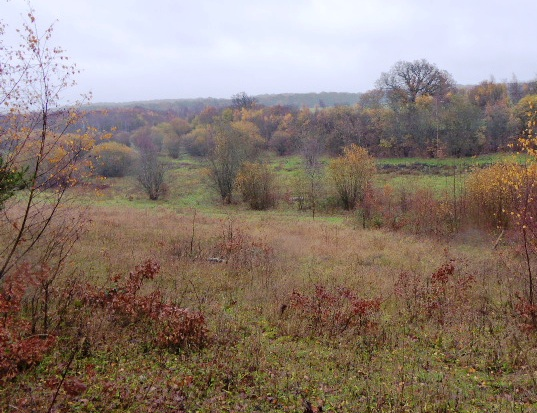
- Interactive map of Inholms Clay Pit
- Type: Local Nature Reserve
- Location: Dorking, Surrey
- OS grid: TQ 174 471
- Area: 8.4 hectares (21 acres)
- Manager: Surrey Wildlife Trust

Inholms Clay Pit is a 8.4-hectare (21-acre) Local Nature Reserve south of Dorking in Surrey. It is owned by Mole Valley District Council and from 2009 - 2019 was managed by Surrey Wildlife Trust and since then by Mole Valley District Council.

This former clay quarry has young woodland and open grassland. Flora in the woods include dog's mercury and wood anemone, while the grassland has orchids almost entirely common spotted.

Access is from Inholms Lane via a footpath from Holmbury Drive.

The interest of the site lies in its successional diversity, as is typical for brownfield sites. Habitats range from ancient semi natural woodland to freshly bare soil, with many areas that were bare soil 40 years or more ago. Two south-facing cliffs were created by SWT around 2012 to benefit thermophilic hymenoptera, a first for Surrey.
