= Riverside Walk, Virginia Water =

Park in Surrey, UK

Coordinates: 51.399°N 0.573°W

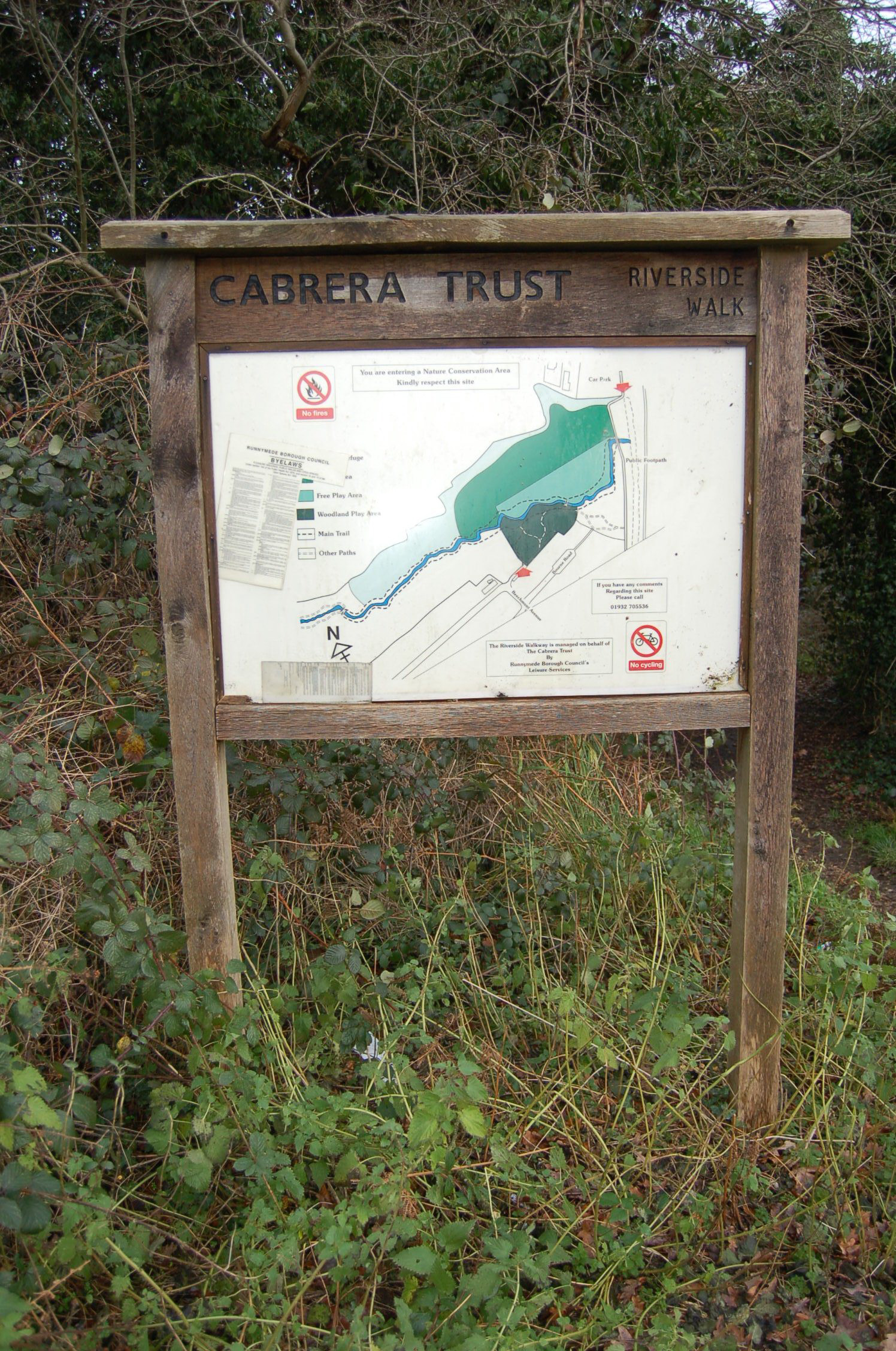
- Interactive map of Riverside Walk, Virginia Water
- Type: Local nature reserve
- Location: Virginia Water, Surrey, England
- OS grid: SU 994 676
- Area: 21.2 hectares (52 acres)
- Manager: The Cabrera Trust Committee

Riverside Walk is a 21.2-hectare (52-acre) local nature reserve in Virginia Water, Surrey. It is owned by Runnymede Borough Council and managed by The Cabrera Trust Committee.

This is a woodland site along the banks of the River Bourne. The wildlife is diverse and 250 plant species have been recorded, along with 57 different birds. A large part of the woodland is wet, but some drier areas have oak and birch trees. Mammals include three species of deer, foxes and bats.

There is access from Cabrera Avenue.
