= Riverside Park, Guildford =

Nature reserve in Surrey, England

Coordinates: 51.255°N 0.561°W

Riverside Park
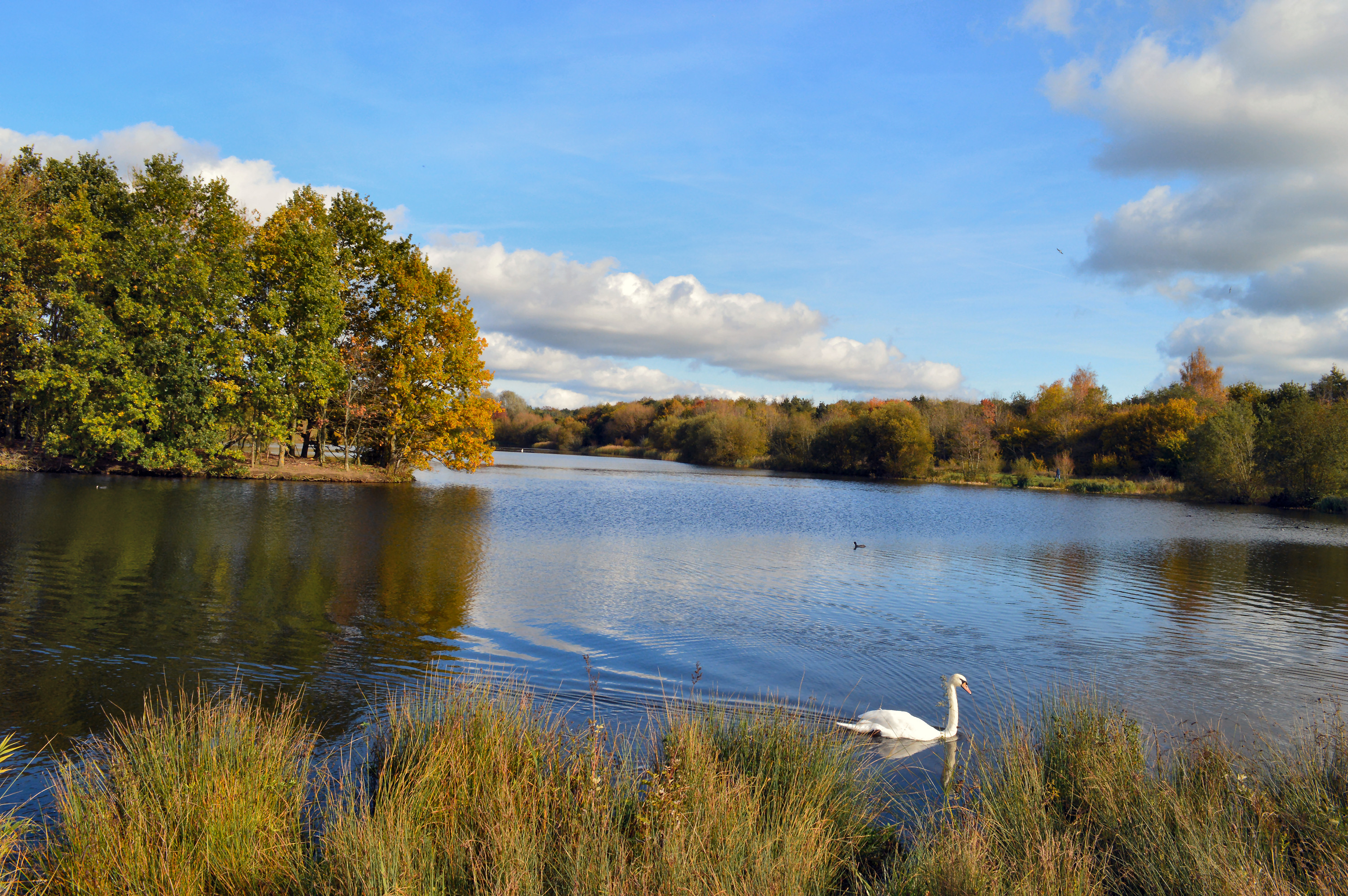
- Interactive map of Riverside Park
- Type: Local Nature Reserve
- Location: Guildford, Surrey
- OS grid: TQ 005 516
- Area: 61.6 hectares (152 acres)
- Manager: Guildford Borough Council

Riverside Park is a 61.6-hectare (152-acre) Local Nature Reserve in Guildford in Surrey. It is owned by Guildford Borough Council and the National Trust and managed by Guildford Borough Council.

This wetland site has open water and reedbeds. Breeding birds include terns, sedge warblers, reed buntings, water rails, redshanks, snipe and lapwings.

There is access from Bowers Lane.
