= Hogsmill LNR =

Nature reserve in Surrey, England

Coordinates: 51.361°N 0.268°W

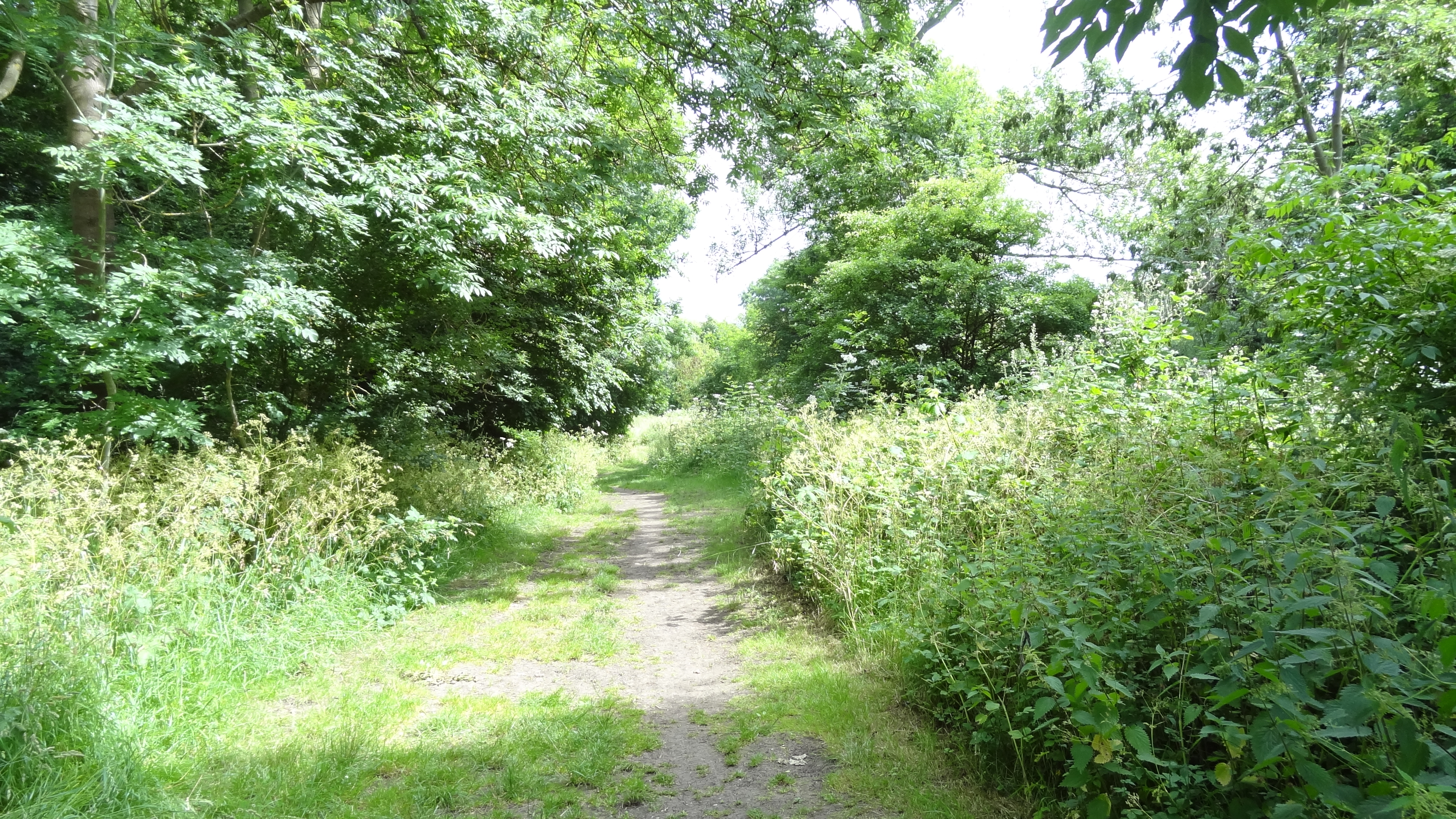
- Interactive map of Hogsmill LNR
- Type: Local Nature Reserve
- Location: Ewell, Surrey
- OS grid: TQ 207 639
- Area: 36.0 hectares (89 acres)
- Manager: Epsom and Ewell Borough Council

Hogsmill LNR is a 36-hectare (89-acre) Local Nature Reserve in Ewell in Surrey. It is owned by Epsom and Ewell Borough Council and Surrey County Council and managed by Epsom and Ewell Borough Council.

This site along the Hogsmill River and its banks has woodland, scrub and open grassy rides. Bird species include firecrests, kingfishers, fieldfares and redwings, while there are butterflies such as red admirals and peacocks.

There are many access points to the site.
