= Centenary Fields =

Nature reserve in Surrey, England

Coordinates: 51.178°N 0.016°W

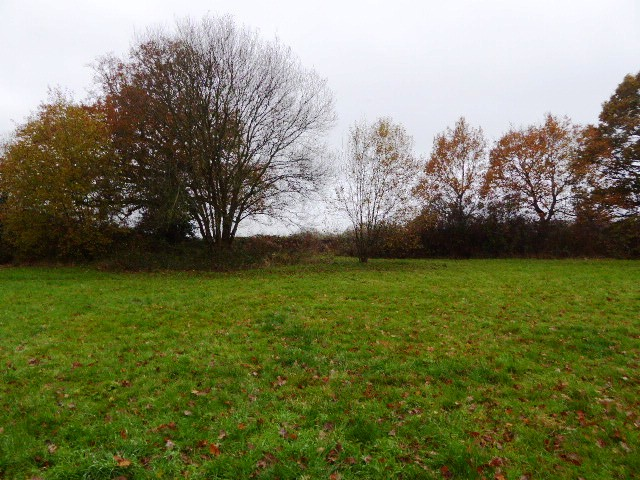
- Interactive map of Centenary Fields
- Type: Local Nature Reserve
- Location: Lingfield, Surrey
- OS grid: TQ 386 440
- Area: 4.2 hectares (10 acres)
- Manager: Lingfield Wildlife Area Committee

Centenary Fields is a 4.2-hectare (10-acre) Local Nature Reserve in Lingfield in Surrey. It is owned by Lingfield Parish Council and managed by Lingfield Wildlife Area Committee.

This site, which is managed by local volunteers, has grassland, a wildflower meadow, allotments, a butterfly garden and a community orchard where a local variety of apple, the Lingfield Forge, is being grown.

There is access from Vicarage Road.
