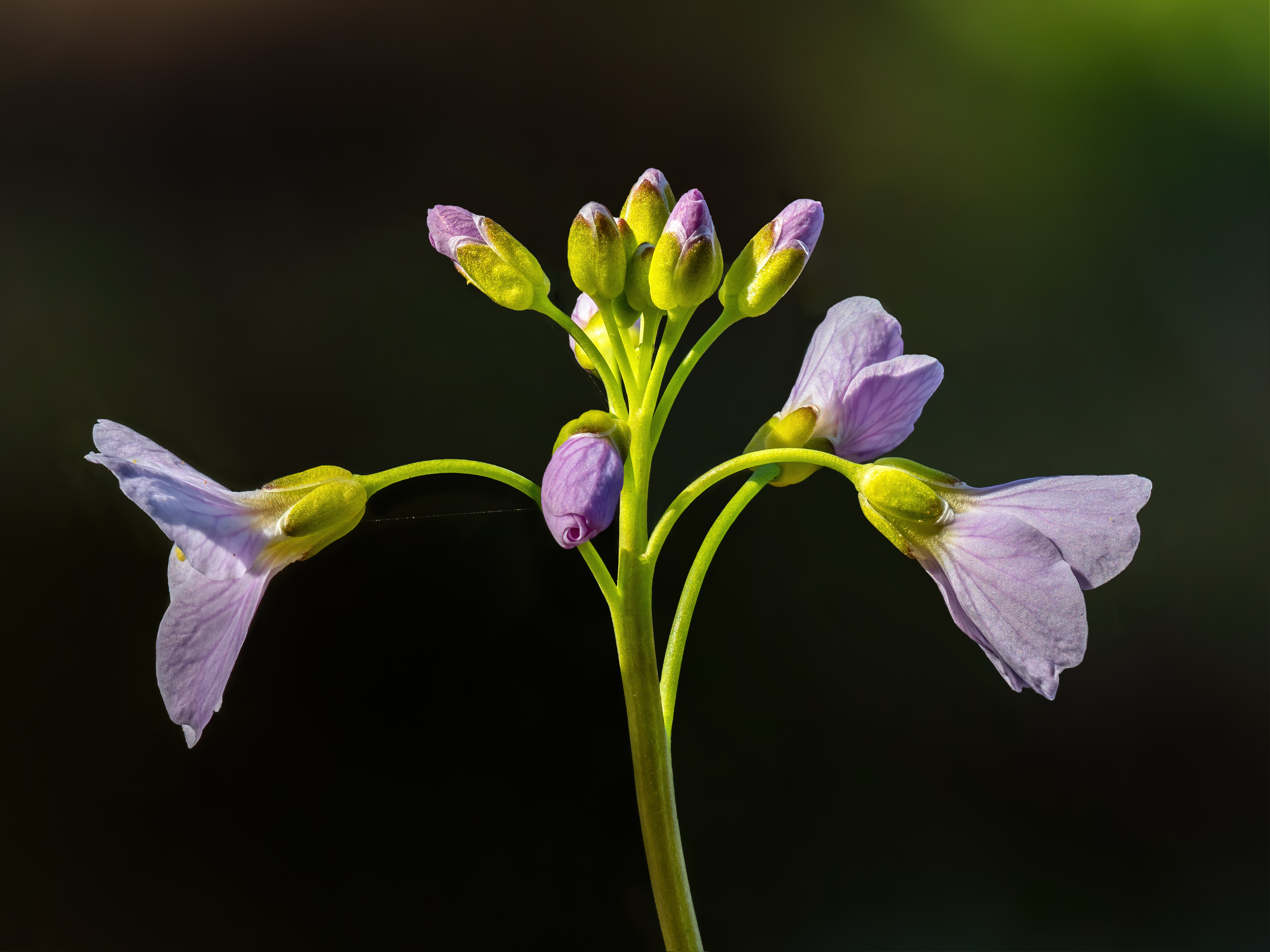

Scientific classification
- Kingdom: Plantae
- Clade: Tracheophytes
- Clade: Angiosperms
- Clade: Eudicots
- Clade: Rosids
- Order: Brassicales
- Family: Brassicaceae
- Genus: Cardamine
- Species: C. pratensis

Binomial name
- Cardamine pratensis L.

Synonyms
- Cardamine dentata Schult.

= Cardamine pratensis =

Species of flowering plant in the cabbage family

Cardamine pratensis, the cuckoo flower, lady's smock, mayflower, or milkmaids, is a flowering plant in the family Brassicaceae. It is a perennial herb native to Eurasia.

== Description ==
Cardamine pratensis is a herbaceous, hairless, perennial plant growing to 60 centimetres (24 in) tall, with pinnate leaves 5–12 cm (2–4 3/4 in) long with 3–15 leaflets, each leaflet about 1 cm long. The flowers are produced on a spike 10–30 cm (4–12 in) long, each flower 1–2 cm in diameter with four very pale violet-pink (rarely white) petals. and 6 stamens. The fruit is a seed pod up to 5 cm (2 in). It grows best close to water.

== Etymology ==
The specific name pratensis is Latin for "from/of the meadow".

Its common name cuckoo flower derives from the formation of the plant's flowers at around the same time as the arrival each spring of the first cuckoos in the British Isles. An alternative 16th century dated tale refers to 'cuckoo spit', which the plant is sometimes covered in, due to a bug called the froghopper and not the cuckoo.

== Distribution ==
The species is widespread in Europe and commonly found throughout the British Isles.

Recorded in Ireland from all 40 of the "vice-counties" (a system adopted by Robert Lloyd Praeger in 1901).

== Cultivation ==
It is grown as an ornamental plant in gardens, and has become naturalised in North America as a result of cultivation. In some European countries, including parts of Germany, the plant is now under threat.

It is a food plant for Anthocharis cardamines (the orange-tip butterfly).

== Uses ==
The plant is edible with a peppery taste similar to watercress.

== In culture ==
In folklore it was said to be sacred to the fairies, and so was unlucky if brought indoors. It was not included in May Day garlands for the same reason.

It is the county flower of both the English county of Cheshire and of the Welsh county of Brecknockshire.

== Gallery ==
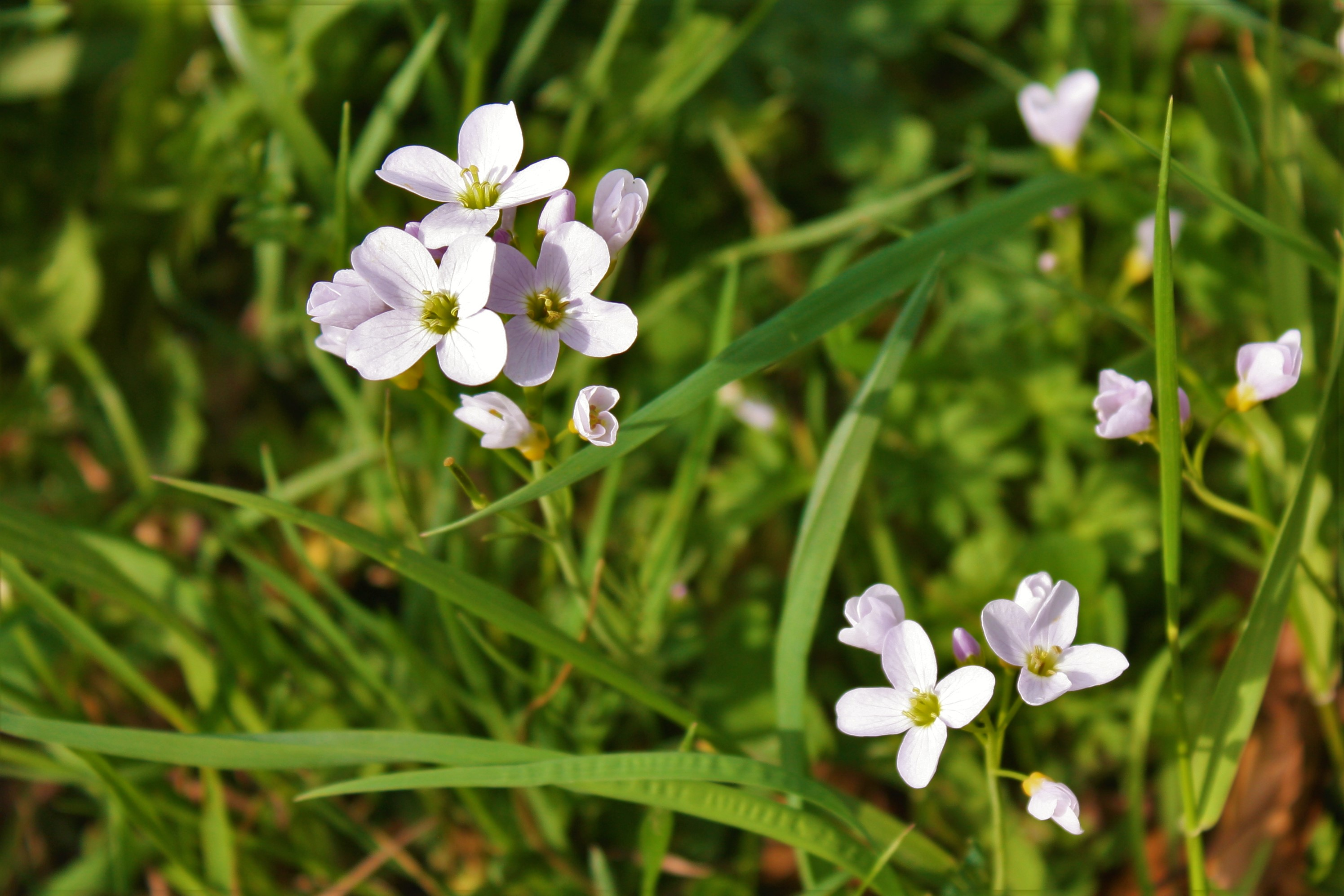
Cardamine pratensis in Bavaria, Germany

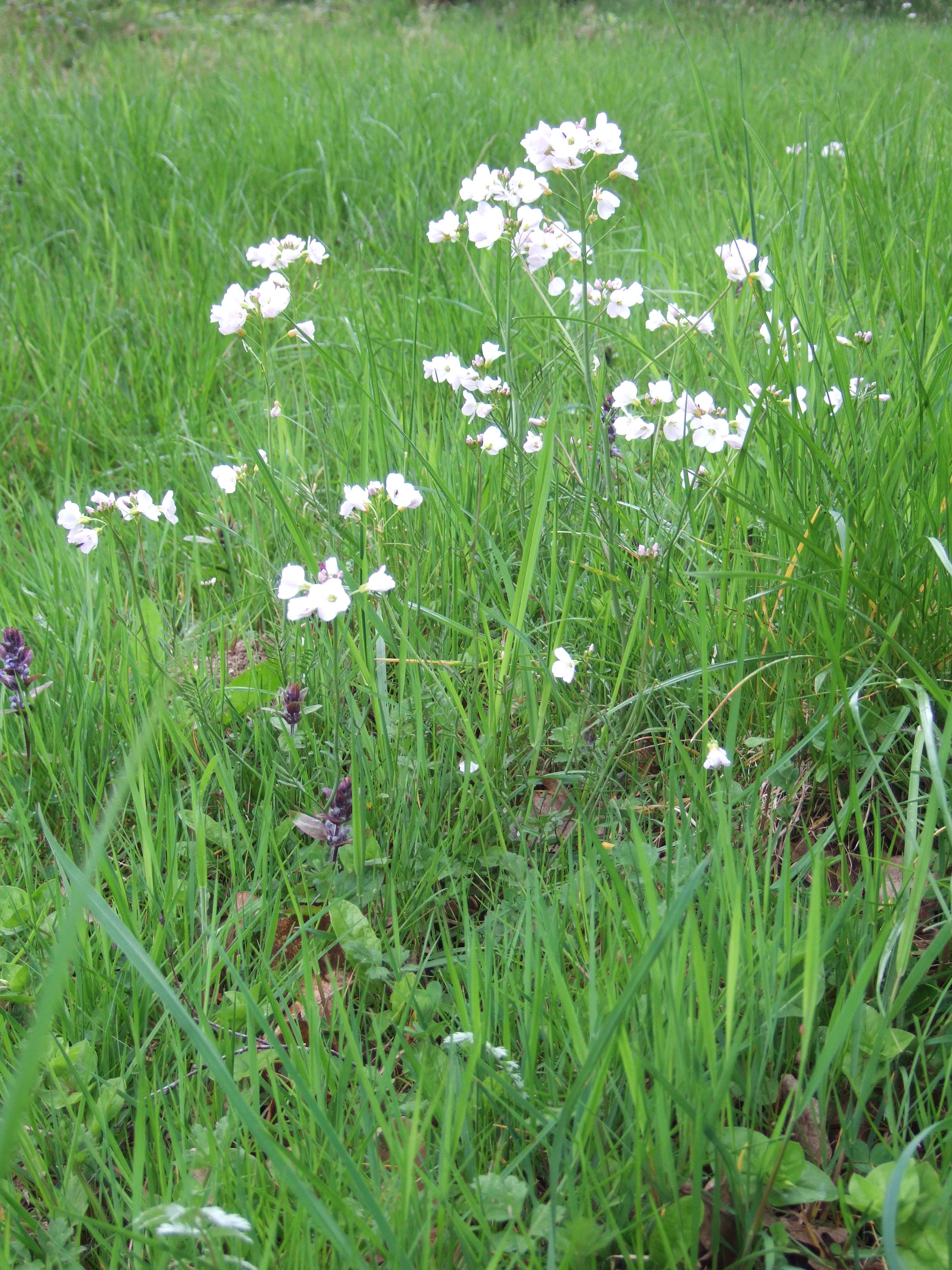
Cardamine pratensis growing in Wiltshire, UK

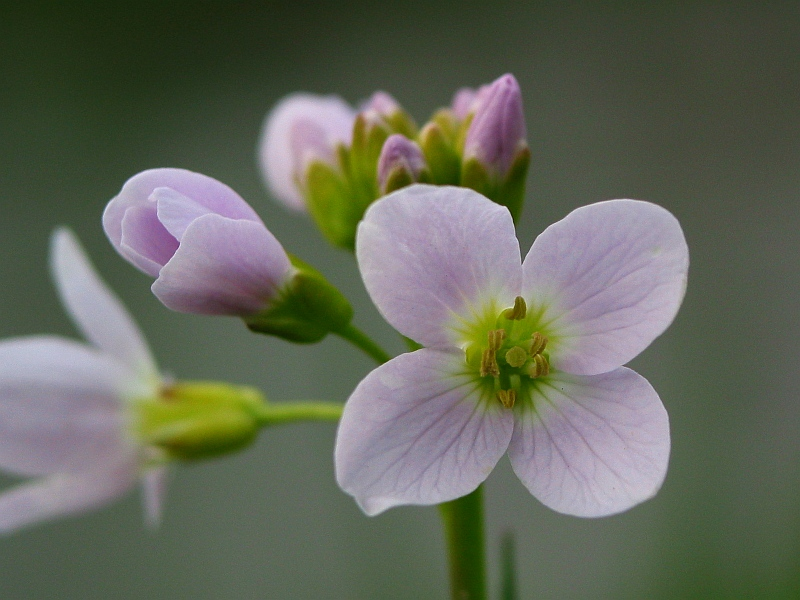
Details of flowers

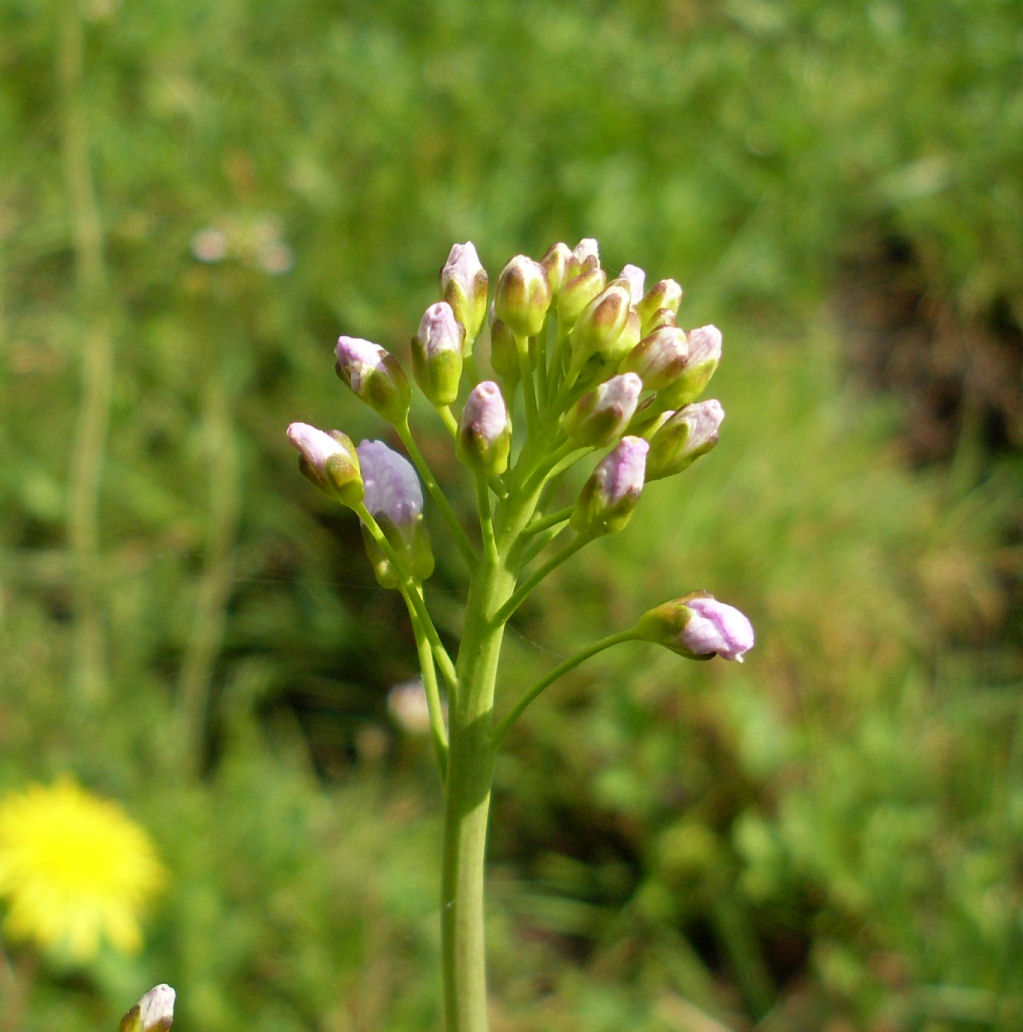
Buds of a Cardamine pratensis

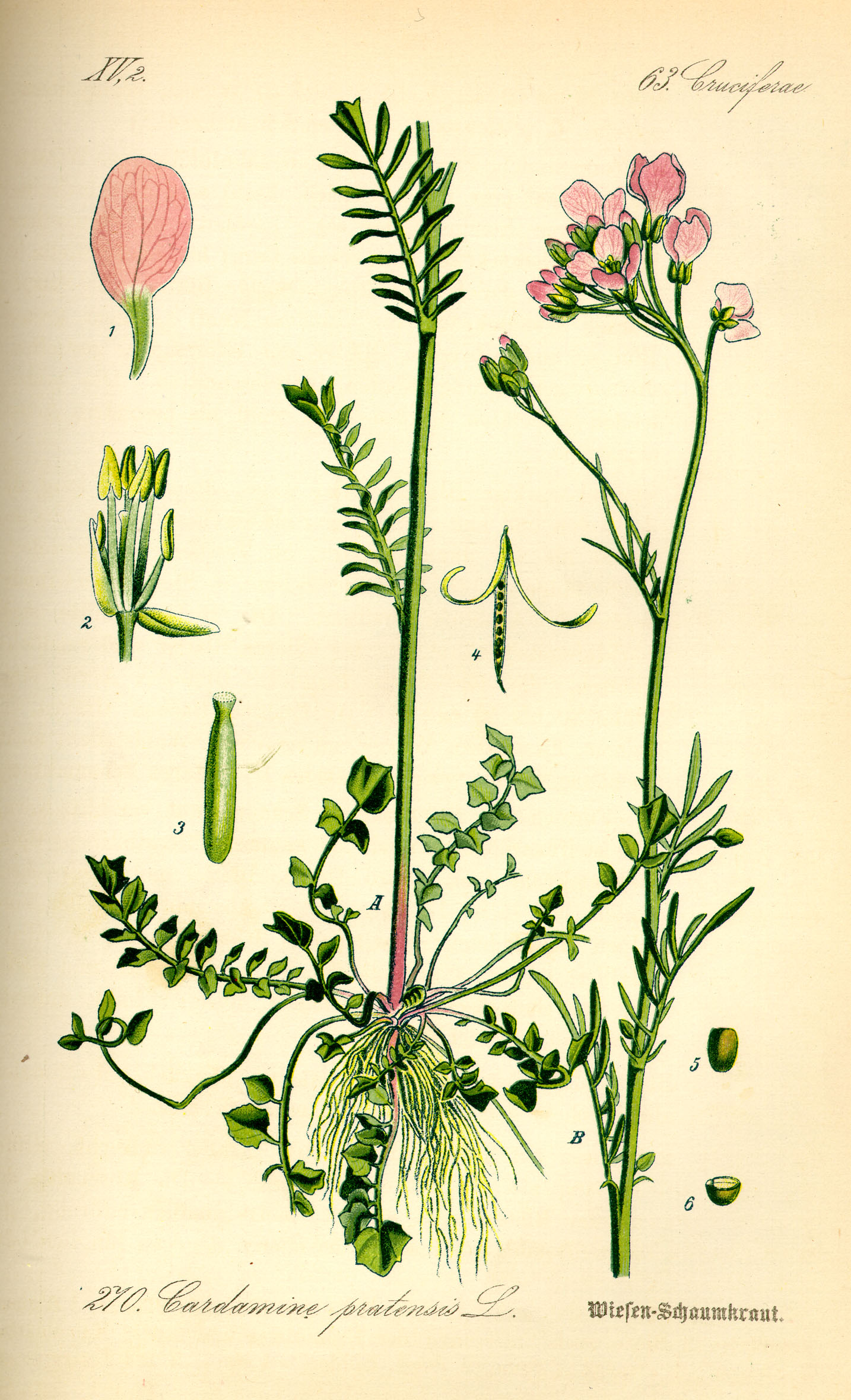
Botanical illustration from Otto Wilhelm Thomé Flora von Deutschland, Österreich und der Schweiz 1885, Gera, Germany

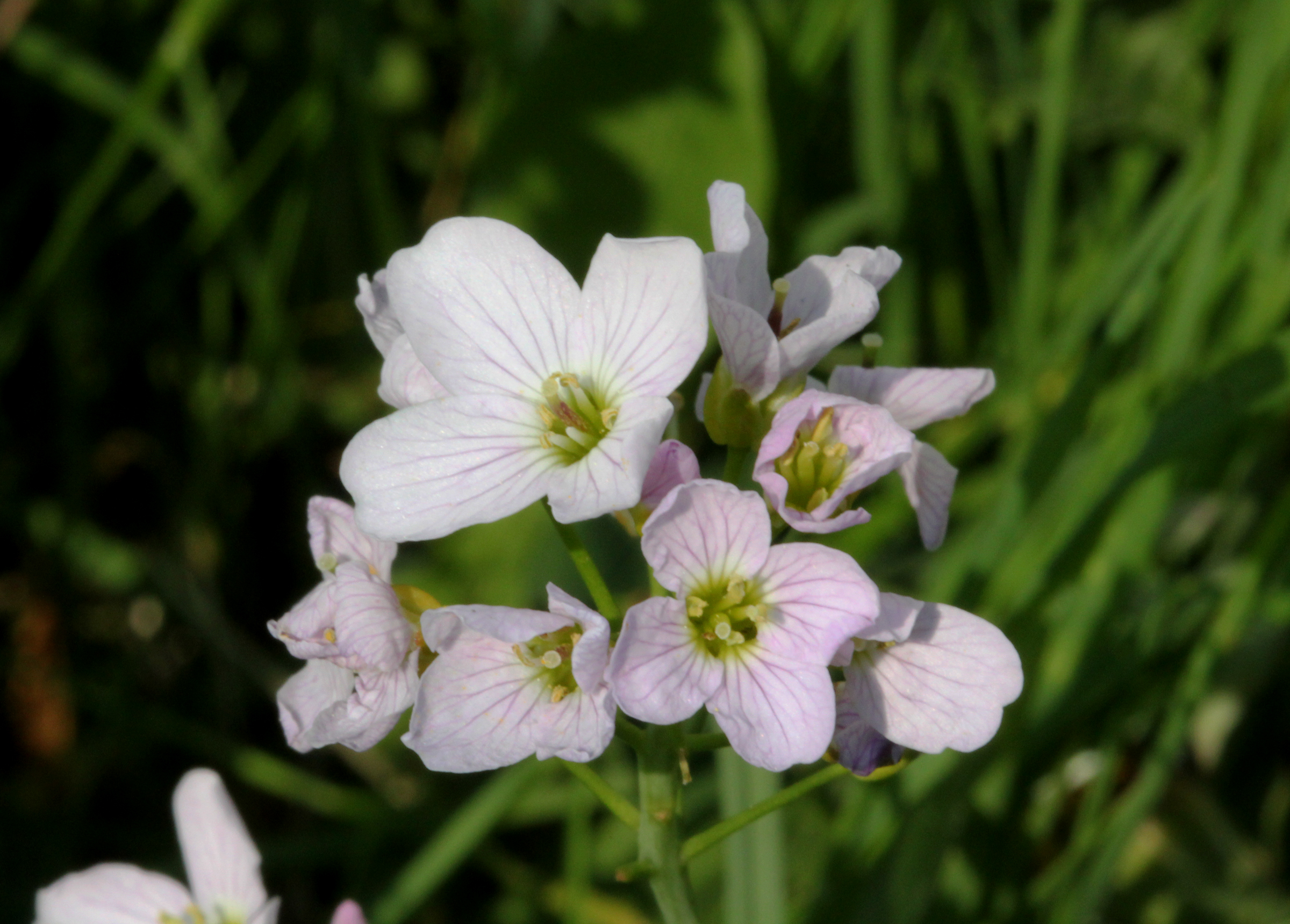
Flowers

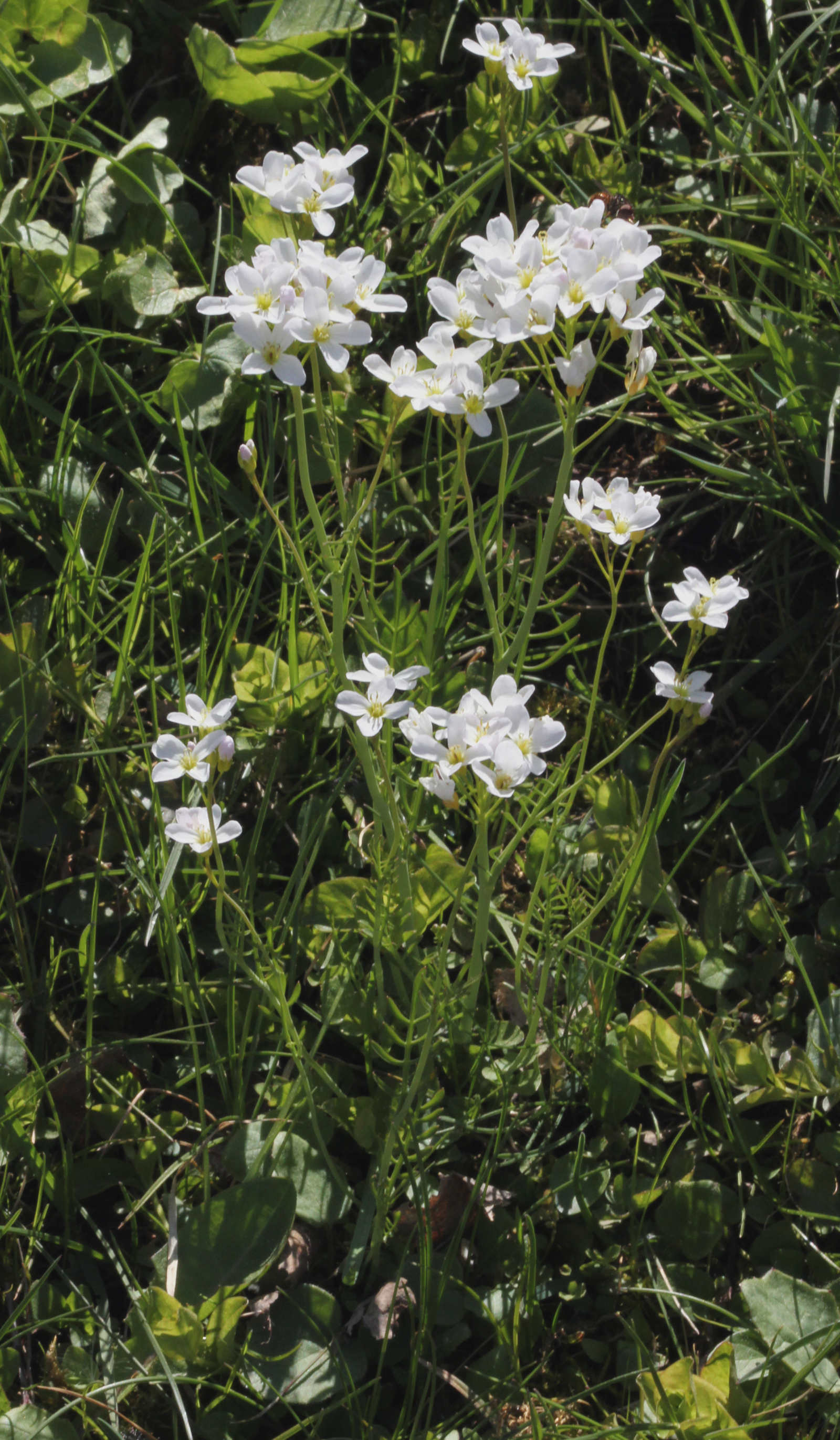
Plants

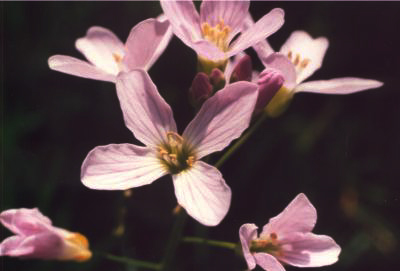
Flowers, pinker variety

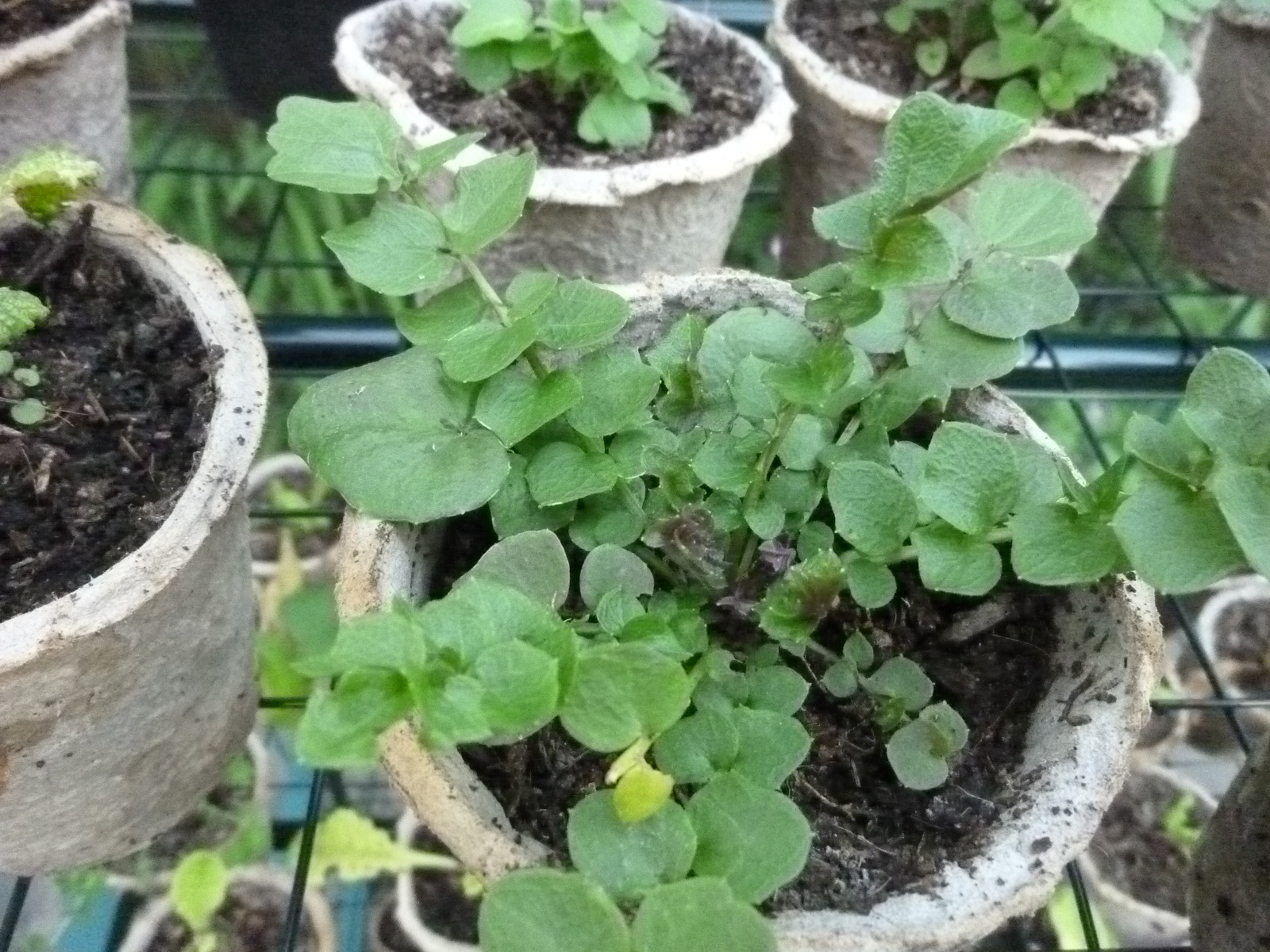
Seedling
