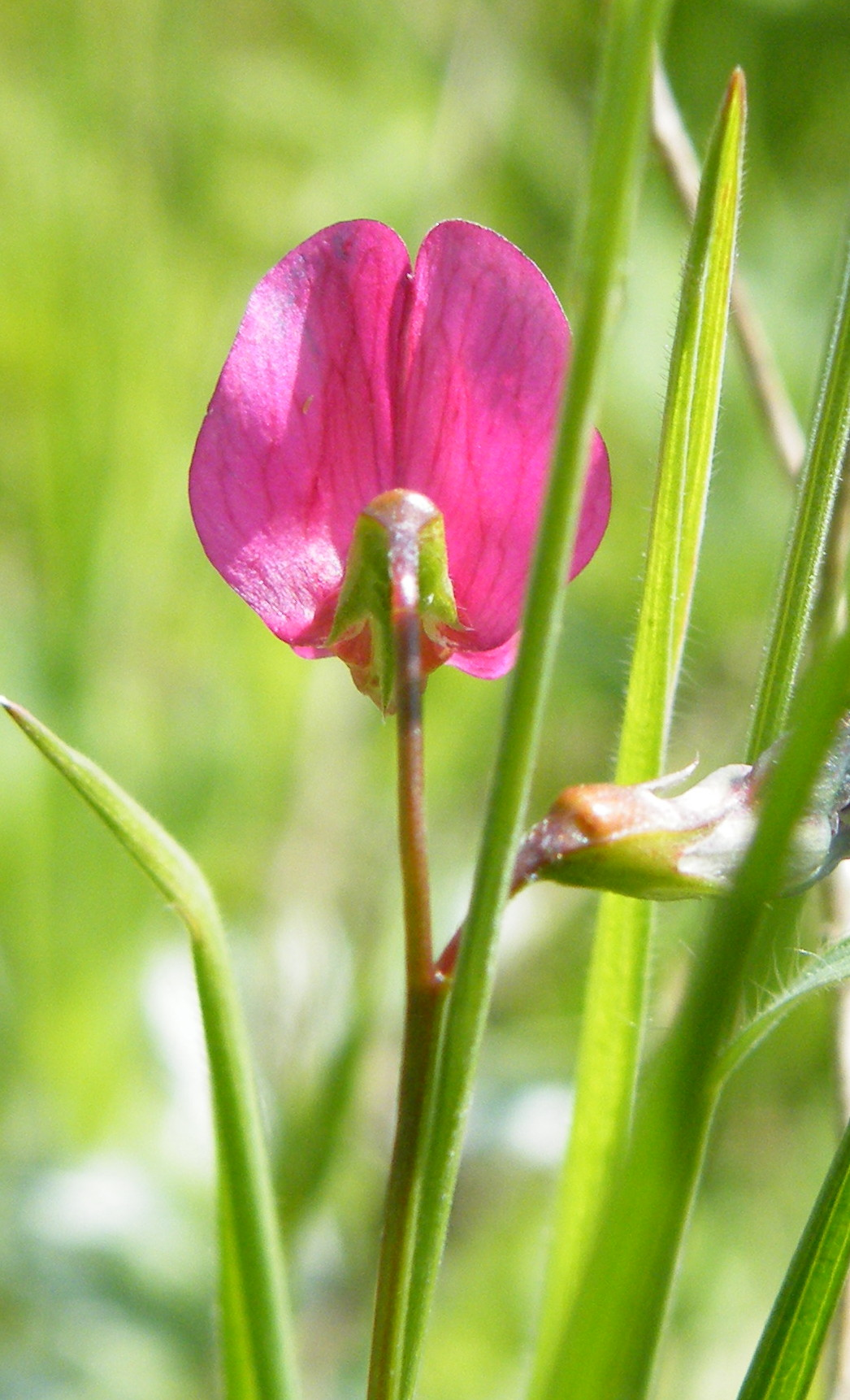
- In flower in East Sussex, England

Scientific classification
- Kingdom: Plantae
- Clade: Tracheophytes
- Clade: Angiosperms
- Clade: Eudicots
- Clade: Rosids
- Order: Fabales
- Family: Fabaceae
- Subfamily: Faboideae
- Genus: Lathyrus
- Species: L. nissolia

Binomial name
- Lathyrus nissolia L.

= Lathyrus nissolia =

Species of legume

Lathyrus nissolia, the grass vetchling, is a species of flowering plant in the pea and bean family Fabaceae. Its common name refers to the grass-like foliage; an older alternative name is grass pea.

== Description ==
Grass vetchling is an annual plant, with an erect stem branching from the base, and growing to a height of up to 90 cm. It is entirely without true leaves, leaflets or tendrils. The leaf stalk, however, is flattened out until it closely resembles a blade of grass up to 15 cm long and ending in a fine point, and the stipules at its base greatly help the deception.

The crimson flowers come out in June and July, and are rather small (8–18 mm long), solitary or in pairs, on a very long peduncle. They have the ability to self-pollinate.

The flowers are succeeded by long, slender, straight pods, which are at first very flat, but become cylindrical when the contained peas are fully developed.

== Habitat ==
Grassland, banks and field margins on neutral to acid soil.

== Distribution ==
It is native to most of Europe, Maghreb, Levant and the Caucasus. In the United Kingdom, where it is currently spreading, it is widespread in southern and central England and Wales, but scarcer in northern England, and localised in Scotland where it is restricted to the Central Belt. In 2012 it had not been recorded from Ireland, but had become established there as a neophyte by 2020.
