= Tandridge District Council elections =

Local government elections in Surrey, England

One third of Tandridge District Council in Surrey, England was elected each year, followed by one year when there is an election to Surrey County Council instead. Since the last boundary changes in 2000, 42 councillors have been elected from 20 wards. The council is due to be abolished on 1 April 2027 following structural changes to local government in Surrey.

== Council elections ==
Summary of the council composition after recent council elections, click on the year for full details of each election. Boundary changes took place for the 2000 election, leading to the whole council being elected in that year.

- 1973 Tandridge District Council election
- 1976 Tandridge District Council election (New ward boundaries)
- 1979 Tandridge District Council election
- 1980 Tandridge District Council election
- 1982 Tandridge District Council election
- 1983 Tandridge District Council election
- 1984 Tandridge District Council election
- 1986 Tandridge District Council election
- 1987 Tandridge District Council election

Year	Conservative	Liberal Democrats	Independent	Labour	Residents Group	Notes
1988	26	11	1	4	0	
1990	20	15	1	6	0	
1991	15	19	1	7	0	
1992	20	18	0	4	0	
1994	22	17	0	3	0	District boundary changes took place but the number of seats remained the same
1995	20	18	0	4	0	
1996	16	19	0	7	0	
1998	17	18	0	7	0	
1999	18	17	0	7	0	
2000	29	10	0	3	0	New ward boundaries. Whole council election (all 42 seats).
2002	29	10	0	3	0	
2003	28	10	1	3	0	
2004	28	11	1	2	0	
2006	29	10	1	2	0	
2007	30	10	1	1	0	
2008	33	8	1	0	0	
2010	33	8	1	0	0	
2011	34	6	2	0	0	
2012	34	6	2	0	0	
2014	34	6	2	0	0	
2015	35	6	1	0	0	
2016	33	7	1	0	1	
2018	22	9	5	0	6	
2019	16	11	8	0	7	
2021	14	9	10	0	8	The election in Felbridge was postponed due to the death of a candidate
2022	10	11	13	0	8	
2023	9	11	14	0	8	
2024	7	11	5	0	20	New ward boundaries. Whole council election with one additional seat (43 seats).

== District result maps ==
2002 results map

2003 results map

2004 results map

2006 results map

2007 results map

2008 results map

2010 results map

2011 results map

2012 results map

2014 results map

2015 results map

2016 results map

2018 results map

2019 results map

2021 results map

2022 results map

2023 results map

2024 results map

== By-election results ==
By-elections occur when seats become vacant between council elections. Below is a summary of recent by-elections; full by-election results can be found by clicking on the by-election name.

By-election	Date	Incumbent party	Winning party
Chaldon by-election	5 May 2005	Conservative	Conservative
Limpsfield by-election	5 May 2005	Conservative	Conservative
Godstone by-election	4 June 2009	Conservative	Conservative
Whyteleafe by-election	2 February 2010	Liberal Democrats	Liberal Democrats
Burstow, Horne and Outwood by-election	2 May 2013	Conservative	Conservative
Whyteleafe by-election	1 April 2015	Conservative	Liberal Democrats
Warlingham West by-election	21 July 2016	Conservative	Conservative
Limpsfield by-election	13 October 2016	Conservative	Oxted and Limpsfield RA
Valley by-election	24 November 2016	Liberal Democrats	Liberal Democrats
Westway by-election	30 November 2017	Liberal Democrats	Liberal Democrats
Felbridge	17 June 2021	Conservative	Independent
Oxted South	1 May 2025	OLRG	OLRG
Whyteleafe	16 October 2025	Liberal Democrats	Liberal Democrats
Lingfield, Crowhurst and Tandridge	6 November 2025	Residents	Residents
Westway	6 November 2025	Conservative	Liberal Democrats
