= 2012 Tandridge District Council election =

2012 UK local government election

Map of the results of the 2012 Tandridge District Council election. Conservatives in blue and Liberal Democrats in yellow. Wards in dark grey were not contested in 2012.

The 2012 Tandridge District Council election took place on 3 May 2012 to elect members of Tandridge District Council in Surrey, England. One third of the council was up for election and the Conservative Party stayed in overall control of the council.

After the election, the composition of the council was:

- Conservative 34
- Liberal Democrats 6
- Independent 2

== Background ==
14 seats were contested in 2012, with a total of 49 candidates standing for election. Before the election the Conservatives ran the council with 34 of the 42 seats, while the Liberal Democrats had 6 seats. Other parties standing at the election were the UK Independence Party with 13 candidates, the Labour Party with 6 candidates and 3 candidates from the Green Party.

Among the councillors who stood down at the election was the longest serving councillor Richard Butcher of Woldingham ward, after 39 years on the council.

== Election result ==
The Conservatives and Liberal Democrats finished with the same number of seats, after each party gained a seat from the other. This left the Conservatives with 34 seats, the Liberal Democrats on 6 seats and there remained 2 Independent councillors. The Conservatives won 11 of the 14 seats contested, after gaining Whyteleafe from the Liberal Democrats by 81 votes, while the council leader Gordon Keymer was among those to hold their seats.

However the Liberal Democrats won 3 seats and gained a seat from the Conservatives by 99 votes in Warlingham East, Chelsham and Farleigh, where Jeremy Pursehouse regaining a seat on the council he had lost at the 2008 election. Meanwhile, the UK Independence Party failed to win any seats, but did come second in three wards. Overall turnout at the election was 34.53%.

Tandridge local election result 2012
Party	Seats	Gains	Losses	Net gain/loss	Seats %	Votes %	Votes	+/−
Conservative	11	1	1	0	78.6	49.8	8,245	-2.7
Liberal Democrats	3	1	1	0	21.4	24.5	4,068	+4.2
UKIP	0	0	0	0	0.0	16.5	2,741	+4.3
Labour	0	0	0	0	0.0	7.1	1,182	-1.6
Green	0	0	0	0	0.0	1.7	288	+1.2
Independent	0	0	0	0	0.0	0.3	48	-5.2

== Ward results ==
Bletchingley and Nutfield
Party	Candidate	Votes	%	±%
Conservative	Debbie Vickers	760	56.0	−6.3
UKIP	Helena Windsor	335	24.7	+12.3
Liberal Democrats	Richard Fowler	262	19.3	+7.5
Majority		425	31.3	−18.6
Turnout		1,357	31.7	−13.8
Conservative hold		Swing		

Burstow, Horne and Outwood
Party	Candidate	Votes	%	±%
Conservative	Alan Jones	841	62.0	−2.6
UKIP	Graham Bailey	286	21.1	+8.9
Labour	Stephen Case-Green	230	16.9	+3.3
Majority		555	40.9	−10.1
Turnout		1,357	29.9	−14.0
Conservative hold		Swing		

Godstone
Party	Candidate	Votes	%	±%
Conservative	Jules Gascoigne	707	57.2	−2.4
UKIP	Richard Grant	530	42.8	+27.0
Majority		177	14.3	−29.4
Turnout		1,237	29.8	−14.1
Conservative hold		Swing		

Harestone
Party	Candidate	Votes	%	±%
Conservative	Michael Cooper	639	63.3	−2.3
Liberal Democrats	Alun Jones	211	20.9	−2.2
UKIP	Martin Ferguson	160	15.8	+11.6
Majority		428	42.4	−0.1
Turnout		1,010	33.5	−40.6
Conservative hold		Swing		

Oxted North and Tandridge
Party	Candidate	Votes	%	±%
Conservative	Gordon Keymer	879	53.3	−6.9
Liberal Democrats	Stuart Paterson	270	16.4	−12.4
UKIP	Christopher Dean	226	13.7	+2.6
Labour	Geoffrey Moore	145	8.8	+8.8
Green	Charlotte Nicholls	129	7.8	+7.8
Majority		609	36.9	+5.5
Turnout		1,649	37.6	−16.1
Conservative hold		Swing		

Oxted South
Party	Candidate	Votes	%	±%
Conservative	Liz Parker	776	44.8	−0.6
Labour	Barbara Harling	524	30.3	+1.0
UKIP	Tony Stone	240	13.9	+4.7
Liberal Democrats	Robert Wingate	115	6.6	−4.9
Green	James Thompson-Stewart	77	4.4	−0.3
Majority		252	14.5	−1.6
Turnout		1,732	38.8	−15.4
Conservative hold		Swing		

Portley
Party	Candidate	Votes	%	±%
Liberal Democrats	Hilary Turner	565	52.3	+9.4
Conservative	Ron Marks	347	32.1	−8.3
UKIP	Mark Fowler	121	11.2	+2.1
Independent	Emma Wheale	48	4.4	+4.4
Majority		218	20.2	+17.7
Turnout		1,081	33.4	−11.4
Liberal Democrats hold		Swing		

Queens Park
Party	Candidate	Votes	%	±%
Conservative	Geoffrey Duck	503	42.9	−4.7
Liberal Democrats	Bob Tomlin	472	40.2	−5.6
UKIP	Roger Bird	128	10.9	+10.9
Labour	John Watts	70	6.0	−0.6
Majority		31	2.6	+0.8
Turnout		1,173	41.4	−31.2
Conservative hold		Swing		

Valley
Party	Candidate	Votes	%	±%
Conservative	Jane Ingham	399	39.9	+4.7
Liberal Democrats	Peter Roberts	294	29.4	−10.3
UKIP	Jeffrey Bolter	131	13.1	+0.0
Labour	Martha Evans	93	9.3	−2.7
Green	Les Adams	82	8.2	+8.2
Majority		105	10.5	
Turnout		999	34.0	−12.2
Conservative hold		Swing		

Warlingham East, Chelsham and Farleigh
Party	Candidate	Votes	%	±%
Liberal Democrats	Jeremy Pursehouse	707	45.0	+7.8
Conservative	Chris Camden	608	38.7	−6.9
UKIP	Martin Haley	255	16.2	+7.8
Majority		99	6.3	
Turnout		1,570	36.9	−9.4
Liberal Democrats gain from Conservative		Swing		

Warlingham West
Party	Candidate	Votes	%	±%
Conservative	David Cooley	591	62.6	+0.7
Liberal Democrats	Wendy Pursehouse	218	23.1	−6.3
UKIP	Arthur Haley	135	14.3	+5.6
Majority		373	39.5	+7.0
Turnout		944	35.5	−38.3
Conservative hold		Swing		

Westway
Party	Candidate	Votes	%	±%
Liberal Democrats	David Gosling	496	55.2	+12.9
Conservative	Peter Brent	204	22.7	−22.1
Labour	Robin Clements	120	13.3	+4.9
UKIP	Christopher Bailey	79	8.8	+3.2
Majority		292	32.5	
Turnout		899	30.4	−33.4
Liberal Democrats hold		Swing		

Whyteleafe
Party	Candidate	Votes	%	±%
Conservative	Tom Dempsey	457	48.2	−2.2
Liberal Democrats	David Lee	376	39.7	−2.5
UKIP	Peter Gerlach	115	12.1	+12.1
Majority		81	8.5	+0.2
Turnout		948	34.4	−32.6
Conservative gain from Liberal Democrats		Swing		

Woldingham
Party	Candidate	Votes	%	±%
Conservative	Sally Marks	534	86.7	+8.1
Liberal Democrats	David Martin	82	13.3	+1.1
Majority		452	73.4	+7.0
Turnout		616	41.2	−10.4
Conservative hold		Swing		

== By-elections between 2012 and 2014 ==
A by-election was held in Burstow, Horne and Outwood on 2 May 2013 after the resignation of Conservative councillor Michael Keenan over the introduction of same-sex marriage. The seat was held for the Conservatives by Christopher Byrne with a majority of 151 votes over the UK Independence Party candidate Graham Bailey.

Burstow, Horne and Outwood by-election 2 May 2013
Party	Candidate	Votes	%	±%
Conservative	Christopher Byrne	699	48.7	−13.3
UKIP	Graham Bailey	548	38.2	+17.1
Liberal Democrats	Judy Wilkinson	188	13.1	+13.1
Majority		151	10.5	−30.4
Turnout		1,435	31.6	+1.7
Conservative hold		Swing		
