= 2010 Tandridge District Council election =

2010 UK local government election

Map of the results of the 2010 Tandridge District Council election. Conservatives in blue and Liberal Democrats in yellow. Wards in grey were not contested in 2010.

The 2010 Tandridge District Council election took place on 6 May 2010 to elect members of Tandridge District Council in Surrey, England. One third of the council was up for election and the Conservative Party stayed in overall control of the council.

After the election, the composition of the council was:

- Conservative 33
- Liberal Democrat 8
- Independent 1

== Background ==
14 of the seats on the council were up for election, with both the Conservatives and Liberal Democrats contesting every seat. 3 Conservative councillors stood down at the election, Eric Morgan from Limpsfield ward, Matthew Groves from Queens Park ward and Ros Langham from Westway ward. Meanwhile, in Burstow, Horne and Outwood ward, the sitting Conservative councillor, Peter Brown, stood as an independent after being deselected and in Whyteleafe Sakina Bradbury defended the seat for the Conservatives after defecting from the Liberal Democrats in 2008. Other parties standing at the election included the UK Independence Party, Labour Party with 8 candidates and the Green Party with 2 candidates.

== Election result ==
The Conservatives remained in control of the council after holding 13 of the 14 seats contested to have 33 seats on the council. No seats changed hands with the Conservatives holding Westway by 29 votes, Queens Park by 37 votes and Whyteleafe by 151 votes. The Conservatives also comfortably held Burstow, Horne and Outwood, despite the challenge from the independent candidate and outgoing Conservative councillor Peter Brown. Meanwhile, the Liberal Democrats won the only seat not held by the Conservatives in Warlingham East, Chelsham and Farleigh by 71 votes to remain on 8 councillors. Overall turnout at the election was 71.63%.

Tandridge local election result 2010
| Party | Seats | Gains | Losses | Net gain/loss | Seats % | Votes % | Votes | +/− |
|---|---|---|---|---|---|---|---|---|
| Conservative | 13 | 0 | 0 | 0 | 92.9 | 54.8 | 19,314 | -3.2% |
| Liberal Democrats | 1 | 0 | 0 | 0 | 7.1 | 30.8 | 10,837 | +1.3% |
| UKIP | 0 | 0 | 0 | 0 | 0 | 7.2 | 2,528 | +1.8% |
| Labour | 0 | 0 | 0 | 0 | 0 | 5.7 | 2,011 | +1.0% |
| Independent | 0 | 0 | 0 | 0 | 0 | 0.9 | 313 | -1.0% |
| Green | 0 | 0 | 0 | 0 | 0 | 0.6 | 211 | +0.1% |

== Ward results ==
Bletchingley and Nutfield
| Party | Candidate | Votes | % | ±% |
|---|---|---|---|---|
| Conservative | Tony Elias | 1,762 | 58.4 | −7.3 |
| Liberal Democrats | Richard Fowler | 896 | 29.7 | +15.0 |
| UKIP | Graham Bailey | 358 | 11.9 | −1.1 |
| Majority | | 866 | 28.7 | −22.3 |
| Turnout | | 3,016 | 70.0 | +32.7 |
| Conservative hold | | Swing | | |

Burstow, Horne and Outwood
| Party | Candidate | Votes | % | ±% |
|---|---|---|---|---|
| Conservative | Peter Bond | 1,762 | 56.7 | −18.4 |
| Liberal Democrats | Sue Gauge | 494 | 15.9 | +15.9 |
| Independent | Peter Brown | 313 | 10.1 | +10.1 |
| Labour | Stephen Case-Green | 277 | 8.9 | −4.6 |
| UKIP | William Nock | 264 | 8.5 | −2.9 |
| Majority | | 1,268 | 40.8 | −20.8 |
| Turnout | | 3,110 | 68.6 | +31.3 |
| Conservative hold | | Swing | | |

Dormansland and Felcourt
| Party | Candidate | Votes | % | ±% |
|---|---|---|---|---|
| Conservative | Michael Sydney | 1,330 | 63.3 | −6.4 |
| Liberal Democrats | Tony Hardisty | 625 | 29.7 | +10.6 |
| UKIP | David Milne | 146 | 6.9 | +1.7 |
| Majority | | 705 | 33.6 | −17.0 |
| Turnout | | 2,101 | 72.6 | +34.3 |
| Conservative hold | | Swing | | |

Godstone
| Party | Candidate | Votes | % | ±% |
|---|---|---|---|---|
| Conservative | Rose Thorn | 1,743 | 57.5 | −0.4 |
| Liberal Democrats | Mary Tomlin | 681 | 22.5 | −2.3 |
| UKIP | Richard Grant | 355 | 11.7 | +1.1 |
| Labour | Maxine Mathews | 252 | 8.3 | +1.7 |
| Majority | | 1,062 | 35.0 | +1.9 |
| Turnout | | 3,031 | 69.7 | +30.9 |
| Conservative hold | | Swing | | |

Harestone
| Party | Candidate | Votes | % | ±% |
|---|---|---|---|---|
| Conservative | Beverley Connolly | 1,446 | 65.6 | −8.5 |
| Liberal Democrats | Anne Bell | 510 | 23.1 | −2.8 |
| Labour | Simon Charles | 156 | 7.1 | +7.1 |
| UKIP | John Norrington | 93 | 4.2 | +4.2 |
| Majority | | 936 | 42.5 | −5.7 |
| Turnout | | 2,205 | 74.1 | +33.3 |
| Conservative hold | | Swing | | |

Limpsfield
| Party | Candidate | Votes | % | ±% |
|---|---|---|---|---|
| Conservative | John Pannett | 1,383 | 63.4 | +2.4 |
| Liberal Democrats | Mark Wilson | 667 | 30.6 | −1.2 |
| UKIP | June Stone | 131 | 6.0 | −1.2 |
| Majority | | 716 | 32.8 | +3.6 |
| Turnout | | 2,181 | 77.7 | +33.7 |
| Conservative hold | | Swing | | |

Lingfield and Crowhurst
| Party | Candidate | Votes | % | ±% |
|---|---|---|---|---|
| Conservative | Brian Perkins | 1,346 | 61.6 | +18.1 |
| Liberal Democrats | James Thompson-Stewart | 680 | 31.1 | −21.2 |
| UKIP | Mark Fowler | 159 | 7.3 | +3.1 |
| Majority | | 666 | 30.5 | |
| Turnout | | 2,185 | 68.8 | +17.2 |
| Conservative hold | | Swing | | |

Oxted North and Tandridge
| Party | Candidate | Votes | % | ±% |
|---|---|---|---|---|
| Conservative | David Weightman | 1,765 | 53.4 | −13.3 |
| Liberal Democrats | Matthew Griffiths | 1,033 | 31.2 | −2.1 |
| UKIP | David Eardley | 216 | 6.5 | +6.5 |
| Labour | Christine Broughton | 181 | 5.5 | +5.5 |
| Green | Benedict Southworth | 111 | 3.4 | +3.4 |
| Majority | | 732 | 22.1 | −11.3 |
| Turnout | | 3,306 | 75.9 | +31.3 |
| Conservative hold | | Swing | | |

Oxted South
| Party | Candidate | Votes | % | ±% |
|---|---|---|---|---|
| Conservative | Barry Compton | 1,471 | 44.9 | −10.7 |
| Liberal Democrats | Robert Wingate | 734 | 22.4 | +2.9 |
| Labour | Barbara Harling | 719 | 21.9 | +10.9 |
| UKIP | Tony Stone | 253 | 7.7 | −1.7 |
| Green | Michaela O'Brien | 100 | 3.1 | −1.3 |
| Majority | | 737 | 22.5 | −13.6 |
| Turnout | | 3,277 | 74.9 | +25.2 |
| Conservative hold | | Swing | | |

Queens Park
| Party | Candidate | Votes | % | ±% |
|---|---|---|---|---|
| Conservative | Rod Stead | 960 | 47.6 | −5.4 |
| Liberal Democrats | Graham Lloyd-Evans | 923 | 45.8 | +2.2 |
| Labour | Emma Wheale | 132 | 6.6 | +3.2 |
| Majority | | 37 | 1.8 | −7.6 |
| Turnout | | 2,015 | 72.6 | +18.9 |
| Conservative hold | | Swing | | |

Warlingham East and Chelsham and Farleigh
| Party | Candidate | Votes | % | ±% |
|---|---|---|---|---|
| Liberal Democrats | Simon Morrow | 1,441 | 46.7 | +2.7 |
| Conservative | Simon Peniston-Bird | 1,370 | 44.4 | −2.4 |
| UKIP | Christopher Bailey | 275 | 8.9 | −0.3 |
| Majority | | 71 | 2.3 | |
| Turnout | | 3,086 | 72.9 | +24.2 |
| Liberal Democrats hold | | Swing | | |

Warlingham West
| Party | Candidate | Votes | % | ±% |
|---|---|---|---|---|
| Conservative | Glynis Whittle | 1,226 | 61.9 | −10.4 |
| Liberal Democrats | Geoffrey Kempster | 583 | 29.4 | +1.7 |
| UKIP | Janet Bailey | 172 | 8.7 | +8.7 |
| Majority | | 643 | 32.5 | −12.1 |
| Turnout | | 1,981 | 73.8 | +30.4 |
| Conservative hold | | Swing | | |

Westway
| Party | Candidate | Votes | % | ±% |
|---|---|---|---|---|
| Conservative | Eithne Webster | 828 | 43.8 | +0.8 |
| Liberal Democrats | Jean Pidgeon | 799 | 42.3 | −8.5 |
| Labour | Jonathan Wheale | 158 | 8.4 | +2.2 |
| UKIP | Helena Windsor | 106 | 5.6 | +5.6 |
| Majority | | 29 | 1.5 | |
| Turnout | | 1,891 | 63.8 | +25.8 |
| Conservative hold | | Swing | | |

Whyteleafe
| Party | Candidate | Votes | % | ±% |
|---|---|---|---|---|
| Conservative | Sakina Bradbury | 922 | 50.4 | +8.8 |
| Liberal Democrats | Christine Greaves | 771 | 42.2 | −11.6 |
| Labour | John Burgess | 136 | 7.4 | +2.8 |
| Majority | | 151 | 8.2 | |
| Turnout | | 1,829 | 67.0 | +31.3 |
| Conservative hold | | Swing | | |
