= 2011 Tandridge District Council election =

2011 UK local government election

Map of the results of the 2011 Tandridge District Council election. Conservatives in blue, Liberal Democrats in yellow and independent in light grey. Wards in dark grey were not contested in 2011.

The 2011 Tandridge District Council election took place on 5 May 2011 to elect members of Tandridge District Council in Surrey, England. One third of the council was up for election and the Conservative Party stayed in overall control of the council.

After the election, the composition of the council was:

- Conservative 34
- Liberal Democrat 6
- Independent 2

== Background ==
Before the election the Conservatives controlled the council with 33 councillors, compared to 7 Liberal Democrats and 2 independents. In 2010 councillor Lisa Bangs had left the Liberal Democrats, in protest against the party's decision to enter a coalition with the Conservatives nationally. Bangs would defend her seat in Lingfield and Crowhurst as an independent against a UK Independence Party opponent. The other independent councillor, Bob David, meanwhile held his seat in Tatsfield and Tisley without opposition.

== Election result ==
The Conservatives increased their majority on the council after gaining one seat from the Liberal Democrats in Warlingham East, Chelsham & Farleigh by a 164-vote majority. This meant the Conservatives won 10 of the 14 seats contested, taking the Conservatives to 34 councillors and reducing the Liberal Democrats to 6. The Liberal Democrats held 2 seats, with group leader Chris Botten holding his seat in Portley by 37 votes and Jill Caudle retained the other seat in Valley with a reduced majority. Meanwhile, independents remained on 2 seats, as former Liberal Democrat Lisa Bangs kept Lingfield and Crowhurst with an increased 1,182 votes. Overall turnout at the election was 48.62%.

At the same time as the election Tandridge voted 72% no in the 2011 Alternative Vote referendum.

Tandridge local election result 2011
Party	Seats	Gains	Losses	Net gain/loss	Seats %	Votes %	Votes	+/−
Conservative	10	1	0	+1	71.4	52.5	11,245	-2.3%
Liberal Democrats	2	0	1	-1	14.3	20.3	4,340	-10.5%
Independent	2	0	0	0	14.3	5.5	1,182	+4.6%
UKIP	0	0	0	0	0	12.2	2,620	+5.0%
Labour	0	0	0	0	0	8.7	1,864	+3.0%
Green	0	0	0	0	0	0.5	112	-0.1%
English Democrat	0	0	0	0	0	0.3	54	+0.3%

== Ward results ==
Bletchingley and Nutfield
Party	Candidate	Votes	%	±%
Conservative	Gill Black	1,222	62.3	+3.9
UKIP	Helena Windsor	243	12.4	+0.5
Liberal Democrats	Helen Kulka	231	11.8	−17.9
Labour	Etna Houldsworth	211	10.8	+10.8
English Democrat	Daniel Beddoes	54	2.8	+2.8
Majority		979	49.9	+21.2
Turnout		1,961	45.5	−24.5
Conservative hold		Swing		

Burstow, Horne and Ourood
Party	Candidate	Votes	%	±%
Conservative	Mike Keenan	1,272	64.6	+7.9
Labour	Stephen Case-Green	267	13.6	+4.7
UKIP	Graham Bailey	240	12.2	+3.7
Liberal Democrats	Sue Gauge	190	9.6	−6.3
Majority		1,005	51.0	+10.2
Turnout		1,969	43.9	−24.7
Conservative hold		Swing		

Chaldon
Party	Candidate	Votes	%	±%
Conservative	Pat Cannon	429	56.5	−15.6
UKIP	Roger Bird	217	28.6	+22.2
Liberal Democrats	Bob Tomlin	113	14.9	−6.5
Majority		212	27.9	−22.8
Turnout		759	53.7	+7.8
Conservative hold		Swing		

Dormansland and Felcourt
Party	Candidate	Votes	%	±%
Conservative	Lesley Steeds	984	70.8	+7.5
Liberal Democrats	Lucy Gummer	253	18.2	−11.5
UKIP	David Milne	153	11.0	+4.1
Majority		731	52.6	+19.0
Turnout		1,390	49.1	−23.5
Conservative hold		Swing		

Felbridge
Party	Candidate	Votes	%	±%
Conservative	Ken Harwood	709	81.7	−0.5
Liberal Democrats	David Martin	91	10.5	−2.3
UKIP	Antony Atkin	68	7.8	+2.8
Majority		618	71.2	+1.8
Turnout		868	50.8	+2.8
Conservative hold		Swing		

Godstone
Party	Candidate	Votes	%	±%
Conservative	Nick Childs	1,139	59.6	+2.1
UKIP	Richard Grant	303	15.8	+4.1
Labour	Ian Crabb	241	12.6	+4.3
Liberal Democrats	Alun Jones	229	12.0	−10.5
Majority		836	43.7	+8.7
Turnout		1,912	43.9	−25.8
Conservative hold		Swing		

Limpsfield
Party	Candidate	Votes	%	±%
Conservative	Lindsey Dunbar	1,058	66.2	+2.8
Liberal Democrats	Mark Wilson	409	25.6	−5.0
UKIP	Janet Bailey	130	8.1	+2.1
Majority		649	40.6	+7.8
Turnout		1,597	57.9	−19.8
Conservative hold		Swing		

Lingfield and Crowhurst
Party	Candidate	Votes	%	±%
Independent	Lisa Bangs	1,182	78.7	+78.7
UKIP	Mark Fowler	319	21.3	+14.0
Majority		863	57.4	
Turnout		1,501	48.6	−20.2
Independent hold		Swing		

Oxted North and Tandridge
Party	Candidate	Votes	%	±%
Conservative	Martin Fisher	1,393	60.2	+6.8
Liberal Democrats	Stuart Paterson	666	28.8	−2.4
UKIP	Christopher Dean	256	11.1	+4.6
Majority		727	31.4	+9.3
Turnout		2,315	53.7	−22.2
Conservative hold		Swing		

Oxted South
Party	Candidate	Votes	%	±%
Conservative	Simon Ainsworth	1,088	45.4	+0.5
Labour	Barbara Harling	702	29.3	+7.4
Liberal Democrats	Robert Wingate	275	11.5	−10.9
UKIP	Tony Stone	221	9.2	+1.5
Green	Michaela O'Brien	112	4.7	+1.6
Majority		386	16.1	−6.4
Turnout		2,398	54.2	−20.7
Conservative hold		Swing		

Portley
Party	Candidate	Votes	%	±%
Liberal Democrats	Chris Botten	625	42.9	−10.3
Conservative	Sally Marks	588	40.4	−2.3
UKIP	James Clifton	132	9.1	+9.1
Labour	Emma Wheale	111	7.6	+3.5
Majority		37	2.5	−8.0
Turnout		1,456	44.8	+6.6
Liberal Democrats hold		Swing		

Tatsfield and Titsey
Party	Candidate	Votes	%	±%
Independent	Bob David	unopposed		
Independent hold		Swing		

Valley
Party	Candidate	Votes	%	±%
Liberal Democrats	Jill Caudle	528	39.7	+19.7
Conservative	Matthew Groves	469	35.2	−2.3
UKIP	Jeffrey Bolter	174	13.1	+3.1
Labour	Jon Wheale	160	12.0	+7.9
Majority		59	4.5	
Turnout		1,331	46.2	+7.0
Liberal Democrats hold		Swing		

Warlingham East and Chelsham and Farleigh
Party	Candidate	Votes	%	±%
Conservative	Mike Wall	894	45.6	+1.2
Liberal Democrats	Geoffrey Kempster	730	37.2	−9.5
Labour	Leslie Adams	172	8.8	+8.8
UKIP	Christopher Bailey	164	8.4	−0.5
Majority		164	8.4	
Turnout		1,960	46.3	−26.6
Conservative gain from Liberal Democrats		Swing		
