= 2014 Tandridge District Council election =

2014 UK local government election

Map of the results of the 2014 Tandridge District Council election. Conservatives in blue and Liberal Democrats in yellow. Wards in grey were not contested in 2014.

The 2014 Tandridge District Council election took place on 22 May 2014 to elect members of Tandridge District Council in Surrey, England. One third of the council was up for election and the Conservative Party stayed in overall control of the council.

After the election, the composition of the council was:

- Conservative 34
- Liberal Democrats 6
- Independent 2

== Election result ==
There was no change in the party composition of the council, with the Conservatives holding all 13 seats they had been defending, while the Liberal Democrats held the other seat contested in Warlingham East, Chelsham and Farleigh. This left the Conservatives with 34 councillors, compared to 6 for the Liberal Democrats and 2 independents. Overall turnout at the election was 42.57%.

The UK Independence Party failed to win any seats, but came second in 10 of the 14 seats contested. They reduced the Conservative majority in many of the wards, coming closest to taking a seat in Godstone, which was held by the Conservatives with a majority of 68 votes. There was only one new councillor elected, with Maureen Young holding the Conservative seat in Dormansland and Felcourt that had been held by fellow Conservative Michael Sydney before he stood down at the election.

Tandridge local election result 2014
| Party | Seats | Gains | Losses | Net gain/loss | Seats % | Votes % | Votes | +/− |
|---|---|---|---|---|---|---|---|---|
| Conservative | 13 | 0 | 0 | 0 | 92.9 | 46.3 | 9,537 | -3.5% |
| Liberal Democrats | 1 | 0 | 0 | 0 | 7.1 | 18.2 | 3,750 | -6.3% |
| UKIP | 0 | 0 | 0 | 0 | 0 | 25.6 | 5,264 | +9.1% |
| Labour | 0 | 0 | 0 | 0 | 0 | 9.9 | 2,032 | +2.8% |
| English Democrat | 0 | 0 | 0 | 0 | 0 | 0.1 | 15 | +0.1% |

== Ward results ==
Bletchingley and Nutfield
| Party | Candidate | Votes | % | ±% |
|---|---|---|---|---|
| Conservative | Tony Elias | 926 | 51.7 | −4.3 |
| UKIP | Ian Crabb | 500 | 27.9 | +3.2 |
| Liberal Democrats | Richard Fowler | 189 | 10.5 | −8.8 |
| Labour | Linda Baharier | 162 | 9.0 | +9.0 |
| English Democrat | Daniel Beddoes | 15 | 0.8 | +0.8 |
| Majority | | 426 | 23.8 | −7.5 |
| Turnout | | 1,792 | 42.3 | +10.6 |
| Conservative hold | | Swing | | |

Burstow, Horne and Outwood
| Party | Candidate | Votes | % | ±% |
|---|---|---|---|---|
| Conservative | Peter Bond | 910 | 50.7 | −11.3 |
| UKIP | Mark Fowler | 573 | 31.9 | +10.8 |
| Labour | Stephen Case-Green | 184 | 10.2 | −6.7 |
| Liberal Democrats | Ingrid De Boer | 129 | 7.2 | +7.2 |
| Majority | | 337 | 18.8 | −22.1 |
| Turnout | | 1,796 | 41.6 | +11.7 |
| Conservative hold | | Swing | | |

Dormansland and Felcourt
| Party | Candidate | Votes | % | ±% |
|---|---|---|---|---|
| Conservative | Maureen Young | 676 | 56.9 | −13.9 |
| UKIP | Ron Palmer | 318 | 26.7 | +15.7 |
| Liberal Democrats | Ron Hardisty | 195 | 16.4 | −1.8 |
| Majority | | 358 | 30.1 | −22.5 |
| Turnout | | 1,189 | 41.0 | −8.1 |
| Conservative hold | | Swing | | |

Godstone
| Party | Candidate | Votes | % | ±% |
|---|---|---|---|---|
| Conservative | Rose Thorn | 708 | 40.9 | −16.3 |
| UKIP | Richard Grant | 640 | 37.0 | −5.8 |
| Liberal Democrats | Colin White | 247 | 14.3 | +14.3 |
| Labour | Sarah MacDonnell | 136 | 7.9 | +7.9 |
| Majority | | 68 | 3.9 | −10.4 |
| Turnout | | 1,731 | 42.3 | +12.5 |
| Conservative hold | | Swing | | |

Harestone
| Party | Candidate | Votes | % | ±% |
|---|---|---|---|---|
| Conservative | Beverley Connolly | 621 | 50.6 | −12.7 |
| UKIP | Martin Ferguson | 268 | 21.8 | +6.0 |
| Liberal Democrats | Alun Jones | 193 | 15.7 | −5.2 |
| Labour | John Burgess | 146 | 11.9 | +11.9 |
| Majority | | 353 | 28.7 | −13.7 |
| Turnout | | 1,228 | 41.3 | +7.8 |
| Conservative hold | | Swing | | |

Limpsfield
| Party | Candidate | Votes | % | ±% |
|---|---|---|---|---|
| Conservative | John Pannett | 774 | 58.4 | −7.8 |
| UKIP | Roger Watts | 276 | 20.8 | +12.7 |
| Liberal Democrats | Sheelagh Crampton | 195 | 14.7 | −10.9 |
| Labour | Michael Vogt | 80 | 6.0 | +6.0 |
| Majority | | 498 | 37.6 | −3.0 |
| Turnout | | 1,325 | 48.8 | −9.1 |
| Conservative hold | | Swing | | |

Lingfield and Crowhurst
| Party | Candidate | Votes | % | ±% |
|---|---|---|---|---|
| Conservative | Brian Perkins | 687 | 55.2 | +55.2 |
| UKIP | David Milne | 319 | 25.6 | +4.3 |
| Labour | Rebecca Pritchard | 123 | 9.9 | +9.9 |
| Liberal Democrats | David Martin | 116 | 9.3 | +9.3 |
| Majority | | 368 | 29.6 | |
| Turnout | | 1,245 | 39.5 | −9.1 |
| Conservative hold | | Swing | | |

Oxted North and Tandridge
| Party | Candidate | Votes | % | ±% |
|---|---|---|---|---|
| Conservative | David Weightman | 1,033 | 51.1 | −2.2 |
| UKIP | Christopher Dean | 421 | 20.8 | +7.1 |
| Liberal Democrats | Stuart Paterson | 356 | 17.6 | +1.2 |
| Labour | Sarah-Jane Wilkinson | 211 | 10.4 | +1.6 |
| Majority | | 612 | 30.3 | −6.6 |
| Turnout | | 2,021 | 46.7 | +9.1 |
| Conservative hold | | Swing | | |

Oxted South
| Party | Candidate | Votes | % | ±% |
|---|---|---|---|---|
| Conservative | Barry Compton | 732 | 39.5 | −5.3 |
| Labour | Barbara Harling | 527 | 28.5 | −1.8 |
| UKIP | Colin Poland | 409 | 22.1 | +8.2 |
| Liberal Democrats | Robert Wingate | 183 | 9.9 | +3.3 |
| Majority | | 205 | 11.1 | −3.4 |
| Turnout | | 1,851 | 43.2 | +4.4 |
| Conservative hold | | Swing | | |

Queens Park
| Party | Candidate | Votes | % | ±% |
|---|---|---|---|---|
| Conservative | Rod Stead | 543 | 42.5 | −0.4 |
| Liberal Democrats | Jane Pugh | 401 | 31.4 | −8.8 |
| UKIP | Kim Minter | 241 | 18.9 | +8.0 |
| Labour | Peter McNeil | 92 | 7.2 | +1.2 |
| Majority | | 142 | 11.1 | +8.5 |
| Turnout | | 1,277 | 45.2 | +3.8 |
| Conservative hold | | Swing | | |

Warlingham East and Chelsham and Farleigh
| Party | Candidate | Votes | % | ±% |
|---|---|---|---|---|
| Liberal Democrats | Simon Morrow | 743 | 39.7 | −5.3 |
| UKIP | Martin Haley | 521 | 27.9 | +11.7 |
| Conservative | Tony Roberts | 506 | 27.1 | −11.6 |
| Labour | John Watts | 100 | 5.3 | +5.3 |
| Majority | | 222 | 11.9 | +5.6 |
| Turnout | | 1,870 | 45.9 | +9.0 |
| Liberal Democrats hold | | Swing | | |

Warlingham West
| Party | Candidate | Votes | % | ±% |
|---|---|---|---|---|
| Conservative | Glynis Whittle | 593 | 51.6 | −11.0 |
| UKIP | John Hill | 319 | 27.7 | +13.4 |
| Liberal Democrats | Sarah Morrow | 238 | 20.7 | −2.4 |
| Majority | | 274 | 23.8 | −15.7 |
| Turnout | | 1,150 | 43.6 | +8.1 |
| Conservative hold | | Swing | | |

Westway
| Party | Candidate | Votes | % | ±% |
|---|---|---|---|---|
| Conservative | Eithne Webster | 358 | 35.1 | +12.4 |
| Liberal Democrats | Costel Petre | 265 | 26.0 | −29.2 |
| UKIP | Tony Baker | 243 | 23.8 | +15.0 |
| Labour | Robin Clements | 155 | 15.2 | +1.9 |
| Majority | | 93 | 9.1 | |
| Turnout | | 1,021 | 34.5 | +4.1 |
| Conservative hold | | Swing | | |

Whyteleafe
| Party | Candidate | Votes | % | ±% |
|---|---|---|---|---|
| Conservative | Sakina Bradbury | 470 | 42.6 | −5.6 |
| Liberal Democrats | David Lee | 300 | 27.2 | −12.5 |
| UKIP | Peter Gerlach | 216 | 19.6 | +7.5 |
| Labour | Mark Bristow | 116 | 10.5 | +10.5 |
| Majority | | 170 | 15.4 | +6.9 |
| Turnout | | 1,102 | 38.0 | +3.6 |
| Conservative hold | | Swing | | |

== By-elections between 2014 and 2015 ==
A by-election was held in Whyteleafe on 1 April 2015 following the disqualification of Conservative Cllr Tom Dempsey for not attending any meetings of the council in six months.

David Lee gained the seat for the Liberal Democrats.

Whyteleafe by-election 1 April 2015
| Party | Candidate | Votes | % | ±% |
|---|---|---|---|---|
| Liberal Democrats | David Lee | 393 | 50.0 | +22.8 |
| Conservative | Peter Sweeney | 274 | 34.9 | −7.7 |
| UKIP | Martin Ferguson | 119 | 15.1 | −4.5 |
| Majority | | 119 | 15.1 | |
| Turnout | | 786 | 26.4 | −11.6 |
| Liberal Democrats gain from Conservative | | Swing | | |
