= 2016 Tandridge District Council election =

2016 UK local government election

Results of the 2016 Tandridge District Council election

The 2016 Tandridge District Council election took place on 5 May 2016 to elect members of Tandridge District Council in England. This was on the same day as other local elections.

== Election result ==
The Conservatives lost three seats but remain in control of the council. The leader of the council, Gordon Keymer CBE, lost his seat to Oxted & Limpsfield Residents' Group candidate Jackie Wren with a swing of 49.3%. The Liberal Democrats picked up the other two gains.

Tandridge local election result 2016
Party	Seats	Gains	Losses	Net gain/loss	Seats %	Votes %	Votes	+/−
Conservative	8	0	3	-3	57.1	40.1	7,583	-9.7%
Liberal Democrats	5	2	0	+2	35.7	22.3	4,211	-2.2%
UKIP	0	0	0	0	0	16.5	3,110	0.0%
Labour	0	0	0	0	0	10.7	2,028	+3.6%
Residents	1	1	0	+1	7.1	9.1	1,721	+9.1%
Green	0	0	0	0	0	0.7	140	-1.0%
Independent	0	0	0	0	0	0.6	107	+0.3%

== Ward results ==
An asterisk * indicates an incumbent seeking re-election.

Bletchingley and Nutfield
Party	Candidate	Votes	%	±%
Conservative	Debbie Vickers*	796	51.9	−4.1
UKIP	Ian Crabb	294	19.2	−5.5
Liberal Democrats	Richard Fowler	269	17.5	−1.8
Labour	Linda Baharier	174	11.4	+11.4
Majority		502	32.7	+1.4
Turnout		1,533		
Conservative hold		Swing		

Burstow, Horne and Outwood
Party	Candidate	Votes	%	±%
Conservative	Harry Fitzgerald	749	49.5	−12.5
UKIP	Mark Fowler	414	27.4	+6.3
Liberal Democrats	Judy Wilkinson	180	11.9	+11.9
Labour	Fern Warwick-Ching	170	11.2	−5.7
Majority		335	22.1	−18.8
Turnout		1,513		
Conservative hold		Swing		

Godstone
Party	Candidate	Votes	%	±%
Conservative	Eileen Blake-Thomas	670	41.1	−16.1
UKIP	Marjory Broughton	649	39.8	−3.0
Labour	Sarah Macdonnell	171	10.5	+10.5
Liberal Democrats	Dave Wilkes	142	8.7	+8.7
Majority		21	1.3	−13.0
Turnout		1,632		
Conservative hold		Swing		

Harestone
Party	Candidate	Votes	%	±%
Conservative	Michael Cooper*	612	54.4	−8.9
Liberal Democrats	Anne Bell	215	19.1	−1.8
UKIP	Graham Bailey	160	14.2	−1.6
Labour	John Watts	139	12.3	+12.3
Majority		397	35.3	−7.1
Turnout		1,126		
Conservative hold		Swing		

Oxted North and Tandridge
Party	Candidate	Votes	%	±%
Residents	Jackie Wren	1,721	71.0	+71.0
Conservative	Gordon Keymer*	622	25.7	−27.6
Labour	Donald Mahon	80	3.3	−5.5
Majority		1,099	45.3	+8.4
Turnout		2,423		
Oxted & Limpsfield Residents' Group gain from Conservative		Swing	49.3	

Oxted South
Party	Candidate	Votes	%	±%
Conservative	Liz Parker*	826	44.8	0.0
Labour	Katherine Saunders	404	21.9	−8.4
UKIP	Christopher Dean	364	19.7	+5.8
Green	Michaela O'Brien	140	7.6	+3.2
Liberal Democrats	Brigid McIntosh	111	6.0	−0.6
Majority		422	22.9	+8.4
Turnout		1,845		
Conservative hold		Swing		

Portley
Party	Candidate	Votes	%	±%
Liberal Democrats	Chris Botten	520	44.8	−7.5
Conservative	Robin Gwynn	387	33.4	+1.3
UKIP	Alex Standen	136	11.7	+0.5
Labour	Lucy McNally	117	10.1	+10.1
Majority		133	11.4	−8.8
Turnout		1,160		
Liberal Democrats hold		Swing		

Queens Park
Party	Candidate	Votes	%	±%
Conservative	Geoffrey Duck*	529	48.8	+5.9
Liberal Democrats	Costel Petre	288	26.6	−13.6
UKIP	Dick Grant	162	15.0	+4.1
Labour	Ollie Chamberlain	104	9.6	+3.6
Majority		241	22.2	+19.6
Turnout		1,083		
Conservative hold		Swing		

Valley
Party	Candidate	Votes	%	±%
Liberal Democrats	Alun Jones	428	38.7	+9.3
Conservative	Liz Goodwin	265	24.0	−15.9
UKIP	Jeffrey Bolter	163	14.7	+1.6
Labour	Rachel Krengel	143	12.9	+3.6
Independent	Mark Jones	107	9.7	+9.7
Majority		163	14.7	+4.2
Turnout		1,106		
Liberal Democrats gain from Conservative		Swing	+12.6	

Warlingham East, Chelsham and Farleigh
Party	Candidate	Votes	%	±%
Liberal Democrats	Jeremy Pursehouse*	853	48.5	+3.5
Conservative	Perry Chotai	471	26.8	−11.9
UKIP	Martin Haley	329	18.7	+2.5
Labour	Patrick Rogers	106	6.0	+6.0
Majority		382	21.7	+15.4
Turnout		1,759		
Liberal Democrats hold		Swing		

Warlingham West
Party	Candidate	Votes	%	±%
Conservative	David Cooley*	593	57.2	−5.4
Liberal Democrats	Celia Caulcott	218	21.0	−2.1
UKIP	John Hill	144	13.9	−0.4
Labour	Jenifer Dugdale	82	7.9	+7.9
Majority		375	36.2	−3.3
Turnout		1,037		
Conservative hold		Swing		

Westway
Party	Candidate	Votes	%	±%
Liberal Democrats	Caroline Warner	416	36.0	−19.2
Conservative	James Richardson	335	29.0	+6.3
UKIP	Sarah Peay	220	19.1	+10.3
Labour	Sally Eason	183	15.9	+2.6
Majority		81	7.0	−25.5
Turnout		1,154		
Liberal Democrats hold		Swing		

Whyteleafe
Party	Candidate	Votes	%	±%
Liberal Democrats	David Lee	535	52.6	+12.9
Conservative	Matthew Groves	361	35.5	−12.7
Labour	Fatima Kamara	121	11.9	+11.9
Majority		174	17.1	+8.6
Turnout		1,017		
Liberal Democrats gain from Conservative		Swing	+12.8	

Woldingham
Party	Candidate	Votes	%	±%
Conservative	Keith Jecks	367	71.7	−15.0
UKIP	Joe Branco	75	14.6	+7.6
Liberal Democrats	Neill Cooper	36	7.0	−6.3
Labour	Thomas Ebbs	34	6.6	−0.4
Majority		452	57.1	−16.3
Turnout		512		
Conservative hold		Swing		

== By-elections between 2016 and 2018 ==
=== Warlingham West ===
A by-election was held in Warlingham West ward on 21 July 2016 following the death of Conservative Cllr Glynis Whittle.

Keith Prew held the seat for the Conservatives.

Warlingham West by-election 21 July 2016
Party	Candidate	Votes	%	±%
Conservative	Keith Prew	367	56.5	−0.7
Liberal Democrats	Celia Caulcott	218	33.6	+12.6
UKIP	Martin Haley	64	9.9	−4.0
Majority		649	23.0	−0.8
Turnout		786	23.7	−19.9
Conservative hold		Swing	-6.7	

=== Limpsfield ===
A by-election was held in Limpsfield ward on 13 October 2016 following the resignation of Conservative Cllr John Pannett.

Phil Davies gained the seat for the Oxted and Limpsfield Residents Group.

Limpsfield by-election 13 October 2016
Party	Candidate	Votes	%	±%
Residents	Phil Davies	713	57.4	+57.4
Conservative	Neil O'Brien	472	38.0	−32.1
Liberal Democrats	Sheelagh Crampton	33	2.7	−9.5
Labour	Simon Charles	25	2.0	−5.0
Majority		241	19.4	−18.2
Turnout		786	43.0	−5.8
Residents gain from Conservative		Swing		

=== Valley ===
A by-election was held in Valley ward on 24 November 2016 following the resignation of Liberal Democrats Cllr Jill Caudle who was moving away from the area to live nearer family.

Dorinda Cooper held the seat for the Liberal Democrats.

Valley by-election 24 November 2016
Party	Candidate	Votes	%	±%
Liberal Democrats	Dorinda Cooper	444	51.6	+16.6
Conservative	Paul Shipway	215	25.0	−8.8
Residents	Jeffrey Bolter	145	16.8	−0.5
Labour	Mark Wood	57	6.6	−7.3
Majority		229	26.6	+25.4
Turnout		861	27.1	
Liberal Democrats hold		Swing		

=== Westway ===
A by-election was held in Westway ward on 30 November 2017 following the resignation of Liberal Democrats Cllr Caroline Warner.

Helen Rujbally held the seat for the Liberal Democrats.

Westway by-election 30 November 2017
Party	Candidate	Votes	%	±%
Liberal Democrats	Helen Rujbally	483	53.5	+17.5
Conservative	Alex Standen	239	26.5	−2.5
Labour	Lucy McNally	118	13.1	−2.8
UKIP	Helena Windsor	62	6.9	−12.2
Majority		244	27.0	+20.0
Turnout		902		
Liberal Democrats hold		Swing		
