= 2000 Tandridge District Council election =

2000 UK local government election

The 2000 Tandridge District Council election took place on 4 May 2000 to elect members of Tandridge District Council in Surrey, England. The whole council was up for election, rather than the normal election by thirds, following boundary changes since the last election in 1999. There remained 42 seats on the council: six three-member wards, ten two-member wards and four one-member wards. The Conservative Party gained overall control of the council from no overall control.

== Background ==
Before the election an alliance between the Liberal Democrats and the Labour Party ran the council, with the Conservatives needing to make four gains to win a majority.

== Election results ==
The Conservatives gained a majority with the leader of the Labour group, Dick Moran, among those to be defeated at the election.

Tandridge local election result 2000
Party	Seats	Gains	Losses	Net gain/loss	Seats %	Votes %	Votes	+/−
Conservative	29			+11	69.0			
Liberal Democrats	10			-7	23.8			
Labour	3			-4	7.1			

== Ward results ==
Bletchingley and Nutfield (3 seats)
Party	Candidate	Votes	%	±%
Conservative	Marian Myland	1,146	62.5	
Conservative	Tony Elias	1,120		
Conservative	Sally Herrtage	1,088		
Liberal Democrats	Brian Martin	534	29.1	
Liberal Democrats	Richard Fowler	483		
Liberal Democrats	Nielsen N.	457		
Labour	Maxine Mathews	154	8.4	
Majority		612	33.4	
Turnout			40.7	

Burstow, Horne and Outwood (3 seats)
Party	Candidate	Votes	%	±%
Conservative	Robert Jones	917	58.1	
Conservative	Diana Brown	902		
Conservative	Peter Brown	898		
Liberal Democrats	Iain Pavely	662	41.9	
Liberal Democrats	John Brock	616		
Liberal Democrats	Johnston K.	597		
Majority		255	16.2	
Turnout			36.9	

Chaldon
Party	Candidate	Votes	%	±%
Conservative	Ian Chaplin	436	69.0	
Liberal Democrats	Ann Lardeur	196	31.0	
Majority		240	38.0	
Turnout		632	45.2	

Dormansland and Felcourt (2 seats)
Party	Candidate	Votes	%	±%
Conservative	June Maylam	718	49.9	
Conservative	John Sampson	693		
Liberal Democrats	Win Weston	643	44.7	
Liberal Democrats	Rob O'Brien	491		
Labour	Jeffers E.	78	5.4	
Majority		75	5.2	
Turnout			47.4	

Felbridge
Party	Candidate	Votes	%	±%
Conservative	Ken Rimmington	440	65.3	
Liberal Democrats	Harry Marsh	234	34.7	
Majority		206	30.6	
Turnout		674	43.8	

Godstone (3 seats)
Party	Candidate	Votes	%	±%
Conservative	Angela Goad	1,093	52.5	
Conservative	Chris Hoskins	909		
Conservative	Linda Samuels	886		
Liberal Democrats	Elvie Humphreys	843	40.5	
Liberal Democrats	Colin White	789		
Liberal Democrats	Milner H.	704		
Labour	Wilbraham D.	146	7.0	
Majority		250	12.0	
Turnout			43.4	

Harestone (2 seats)
Party	Candidate	Votes	%	±%
Conservative	Terry Servant	865	56.8	
Conservative	Stewart Sinclair-Smith	760		
Liberal Democrats	Anne Hare	605	39.7	
Liberal Democrats	Sakina Bradbury	505		
Labour	John Ellis	53	3.5	
Labour	Vane C.	49		
Majority		260	17.1	
Turnout			50.4	

Limpsfield (2 seats)
Party	Candidate	Votes	%	±%
Conservative	Colin Hall	813	70.4	
Conservative	Eric Morgan	804		
Liberal Democrats	Martin Caxton	291	25.2	
Liberal Democrats	Mark Wilson	279		
Labour	Hunter S.	51	4.4	
Majority		522	45.2	
Turnout			41.4	

Lingfield and Crowhurst (2 seats)
Party	Candidate	Votes	%	±%
Liberal Democrats	Anthony Dalrymple	890	60.0	
Liberal Democrats	Julie Hearn	814		
Conservative	Michael Sydney	594	40.0	
Conservative	Nicholas Weston	517		
Majority		296	20.0	
Turnout			48.5	

Oxted North and Tandridge (3 seats)
Party	Candidate	Votes	%	±%
Conservative	Gordon Keymer	1,110	48.7	
Conservative	David Weightman	1,096		
Conservative	Tony Cherrett	991		
Liberal Democrats	Belinda Ford	554	24.3	
Liberal Democrats	Stuart Paterson	506		
Independent	Josh Cosnett	460	20.2	
Liberal Democrats	John Curtin	442		
Labour	Katherine Saunders	157	6.9	
Majority		556	24.4	
Turnout			44.4	

Oxted South (3 seats)
Party	Candidate	Votes	%	±%
Labour	Barbara Harling	1,046	40.5	
Labour	Robin Harling	1,016		
Conservative	Barry Compton	1,010	39.1	
Conservative	Martin Fisher	997		
Conservative	Elizabeth Parker	987		
Labour	Marion West	903		
Liberal Democrats	Ceri Lewis	322	12.5	
UKIP	Anthony Stone	203	7.9	
Majority		36	1.4	
Turnout			54.6	

Portley (2 seats)
Party	Candidate	Votes	%	±%
Liberal Democrats	Hilary Turner	642	52.7	
Liberal Democrats	Christopher Botten	610		
Conservative	Randall H.	482	39.6	
Conservative	Hooper C.	441		
Labour	Allonby R.	94	7.7	
Majority		160	13.1	
Turnout			39.2	

Queens Park (2 seats)
Party	Candidate	Votes	%	±%
Conservative	David Hodge	724	49.2	
Conservative	Geoff Barnes	706		
Liberal Democrats	John Orrick	648	44.0	
Liberal Democrats	David Gosling	554		
Labour	Victoria Kennedy	101	6.9	
Labour	Dixon P.	96		
Majority		76	5.2	
Turnout			52.4	

Tatsfield and Titsey
Party	Candidate	Votes	%	±%
Conservative	Christina Fry	486	70.1	
Liberal Democrats	John Allbutt	189	27.3	
Labour	Ed Lucas	18	2.6	
Majority		297	42.8	
Turnout		693	47.6	

Valley (2 seats)
Party	Candidate	Votes	%	±%
Labour	Peter Longhurst	436	36.6	
Liberal Democrats	Jill Caudle	402	33.8	
Liberal Democrats	Pennington D.	369		
Labour	Shiela Batham	364		
Conservative	Philip Mortimore	352	29.6	
Conservative	Jackie Servant	347		
Majority		34	2.8	
Turnout			42.1	

Warlingham East, Chelsham and Farleigh (3 seats)
Party	Candidate	Votes	%	±%
Liberal Democrats	Jeremy Pursehouse	758	43.3	
Liberal Democrats	Ashley Burridge	749		
Liberal Democrats	Ian Kilpatrick	714		
Conservative	Darren Giles	703	40.1	
Conservative	Goscomb J.	653		
Conservative	Margaret Frankcom	646		
Labour	Garwood J.	147	8.4	
UKIP	Martin Haley	144	8.2	
Majority		55	3.2	
Turnout			42.8	

Warlingham West (2 seats)
Party	Candidate	Votes	%	±%
Conservative	Richard Allen	786	67.6	
Conservative	Glynis Whittle	750		
Liberal Democrats	Ray James	312	26.9	
Liberal Democrats	Barry Newsome	298		
Labour	Robert Jacques	64	5.5	
Majority		474	40.7	
Turnout			43.3	

Westway (2 seats)
Party	Candidate	Votes	%	±%
Conservative	Steve Altria	447	46.8	
Conservative	Ros Langham	440		
Labour	Robin Clements	327	34.2	
Labour	Dick Moran	320		
Liberal Democrats	Jean Pidgeon	181	19.0	
Liberal Democrats	Bob Tomlin	138		
Majority		120	12.6	
Turnout			41.3	

Whyteleafe (2 seats)
Party	Candidate	Votes	%	±%
Liberal Democrats	Mike Simpson	526	58.0	
Liberal Democrats	Carl Pavey	510		
Conservative	Morriss J.	381	42.0	
Conservative	Lavery-Downes M.	341		
Majority		145	16.0	
Turnout			34.7	

Woldingham
Party	Candidate	Votes	%	±%
Conservative	Richard Butcher	644	82.2	
Liberal Democrats	Powell E.	120	15.3	
Labour	Provins L.	19	2.4	
Majority		524	66.9	
Turnout		783	49.5	
