= 2008 Tandridge District Council election =

2008 UK local government election

Map of the results of the 2008 Tandridge District Council election. Conservatives in blue and Liberal Democrats in yellow. Wards in grey were not contested in 2008.

The 2008 Tandridge District Council election took place on 1 May 2008 to elect members of Tandridge District Council in Surrey, England. One third of the council was up for election and the Conservative Party stayed in overall control of the council.

After the election, the composition of the council was:

- Conservative 33
- Liberal Democrat 8
- Independent 1

== Campaign ==
Before the election the Conservatives controlled the council with 31 seats, while the Liberal Democrats were the main opposition with 9 councillors. This was after Liberal Democrat councillor Sakina Bradbury of Whyteleafe ward defected to the Conservatives in February 2008. 14 of the 42 seats on the council were being contested by a total of 45 candidates, with 3 of the sitting councillors not defending seats. The Conservatives contested all 14 seats, compared to 13 Liberal Democrat candidates, 9 Labour Party, 6 UK Independence Party and 1 for the Green Party.

Issues at the election included housing, with Labour calling for more affordable housing, while both the UK Independence Party and Green Party had concerns over the number of houses being built. Other issues included recycling, with the Conservatives pointing to the weekly refuse collection that the council ran, council tax and leisure facilities.

== Election result ==
The Conservative Party retained control of the council and made a net gain of 2 seats to have 42 councillors. The Conservatives gained Queens Park and Warlingham East, Chelsham and Farleigh from the Liberal Democrats and Valley from independent Peter Longhurst. The leader of the council, Conservative Gordon Keymer, said that it had been "a good night for us". However the Conservatives did lose Westway to the Liberal Democrats by 88 votes, which left the Liberal Democrats with 8 seats and there was 1 independent councillor. Overall turnout at the election was 42.3%.

Tandridge local election result 2008
Party	Seats	Gains	Losses	Net gain/loss	Seats %	Votes %	Votes	+/−
Conservative	11	3	1	+2	78.6	58.0	11,577	+3.2
Liberal Democrats	3	1	2	-1	21.4	29.5	5,895	+1.3
UKIP	0	0	0	0	0.0	5.4	1,074	-2.3
Labour	0	0	0	0	0.0	4.7	939	-1.5
Independent	0	0	1	-1	0.0	1.9	387	-1.2
Green	0	0	0	0	0.0	0.5	94	+0.5

== Ward results ==
Bletchingley and Nuffield
Party	Candidate	Votes	%	±%
Conservative	Marian Myland	1,049	65.7	−1.5
Liberal Democrats	Richard Fowler	235	14.7	+0.8
UKIP	Graham Bailey	207	13.0	+0.0
Labour	Rebecca Pritchard	106	6.6	+0.7
Majority		814	51.0	−2.3
Turnout		1,597	37.3	−1.0
Conservative hold		Swing		

Burstow, Horne and Outwood
Party	Candidate	Votes	%	±%
Conservative	Alan Jones	1,251	75.1	+2.7
Labour	Stephen Case-Green	225	13.5	+13.5
UKIP	William Nock	189	11.4	+0.3
Majority		1,026	61.6	+5.6
Turnout		1,665	37.3	+1.9
Conservative hold		Swing		

Godstone
Party	Candidate	Votes	%	±%
Conservative	Jules Gascoigne	985	57.9	−2.2
Liberal Democrats	Colin White	422	24.8	−2.2
UKIP	Helena Windsor	181	10.6	+3.2
Labour	Maxine Mathews	112	6.6	+1.0
Majority		563	33.1	+0.0
Turnout		1,700	38.8	+1.9
Conservative hold		Swing		

Harestone
Party	Candidate	Votes	%	±%
Conservative	Michael Cooper	880	74.1	+8.3
Liberal Democrats	Jill Elliff	307	25.9	−3.0
Majority		573	48.2	+11.3
Turnout		1,187	40.8	
Conservative hold		Swing		

Oxted North and Tandridge
Party	Candidate	Votes	%	±%
Conservative	Gordon Keymer	1,262	66.7	+3.0
Liberal Democrats	Matthew Griffiths	630	33.3	+4.1
Majority		632	33.4	−1.1
Turnout		1,892	44.6	+2.7
Conservative hold		Swing		

Oxted South
Party	Candidate	Votes	%	±%
Conservative	Liz Parker	1,196	55.6	+9.4
Liberal Democrats	Robert Wingate	420	19.5	+8.6
Labour	Marjory Broughton	237	11.0	−23.6
UKIP	Tony Stone	203	9.4	+1.0
Green	Michaela O'Brien	94	4.4	+4.4
Majority		776	36.1	+24.5
Turnout		2,150	49.7	+0.5
Conservative hold		Swing		

Portley
Party	Candidate	Votes	%	±%
Liberal Democrats	Hilary Turner	650	53.2	+1.8
Conservative	Peter Brent	522	42.7	+4.3
Labour	Barbara Henning	50	4.1	−0.5
Majority		128	10.5	−2.5
Turnout		1,222	38.2	−3.1
Liberal Democrats hold		Swing		

Queens Park
Party	Candidate	Votes	%	±%
Conservative	Jeremy Webster	764	53.0	+1.3
Liberal Democrats	Lucy Darlow	629	43.6	−4.7
Labour	Robin Clements	49	3.4	+3.4
Majority		135	9.4	+6.0
Turnout		1,442	53.7	
Conservative gain from Liberal Democrats		Swing		

Valley
Party	Candidate	Votes	%	±%
Conservative	Jane Ingram	415	37.5	+8.0
Independent	Peter Longhurst	315	28.4	+28.4
Liberal Democrats	Anne Bell	222	20.0	−35.4
UKIP	Jeffrey Bolter	111	10.0	+1.5
Labour	John Ellis	45	4.1	−2.5
Majority		100	9.1	
Turnout		1,108	39.2	+1.5
Conservative gain from Independent		Swing		

Warlingham East, Chelsham and Farleigh
Party	Candidate	Votes	%	±%
Conservative	Chris Camden	930	46.8	+3.6
Liberal Democrats	Jeremy Pursehouse	873	44.0	−0.1
UKIP	Martin Haley	183	9.2	−0.7
Majority		57	2.8	
Turnout		1,986	48.7	+5.8
Conservative gain from Liberal Democrats		Swing		

Warlingham West
Party	Candidate	Votes	%	±%
Conservative	David Cooley	814	72.3	+3.0
Liberal Democrats	Sarah Morrow	312	27.7	−3.0
Majority		502	44.6	+6.0
Turnout		1,126	43.4	
Conservative hold		Swing		

Westway
Party	Candidate	Votes	%	±%
Liberal Democrats	David Gosling	573	50.8	+13.0
Conservative	Paul Blanchard	485	43.0	−10.3
Labour	Peter McNeil	70	6.2	−2.7
Majority		88	7.8	
Turnout		1,128	38.0	
Liberal Democrats gain from Conservative		Swing		

Whyteleafe
Party	Candidate	Votes	%	±%
Liberal Democrats	Jeffrey Gray	526	53.8	−6.2
Conservative	Brian Jeffery	407	41.6	+1.6
Labour	John Burgess	45	4.6	+4.6
Majority		119	12.2	−7.8
Turnout		978	35.7	
Liberal Democrats hold		Swing		

Woldingham
Party	Candidate	Votes	%	±%
Conservative	Richard Butcher	617	78.6	−6.2
Liberal Democrats	David Martin	96	12.2	−3.0
Independent	John O'Brien	72	9.2	+9.2
Majority		521	66.4	−3.2
Turnout		785	51.6	−3.7
Conservative hold		Swing		

== By-elections between 2008 and 2010 ==
=== Godstone ===
Godstone By-Election 4 June 2009
Party	Candidate	Votes	%	±%
Conservative	Nick Childs	1,216	64.1	+6.2
Liberal Democrats	Colin White	681	35.9	+11.1
Majority		535	28.2	−4.9
Turnout		1,897	44.2	+5.4
Conservative hold		Swing		

=== Whyteleafe ===
A by-election was held in Whyteleafe on 2 February 2010 after Liberal Democrat councillor Jeffrey Gray resigned from the council when he moved away from Tandridge. The seat was held for the Liberal Democrats by David Lee with 57% of the vote.

Whyteleafe By-Election 2 February 2010
Party	Candidate	Votes	%	±%
Liberal Democrats	David Lee	444	57.0	+3.2
Conservative	Chris Krishnan	236	30.3	−11.3
UKIP	Jeffrey Bolter	99	12.7	+12.7
Majority		208	26.7	+14.5
Turnout		779	28.9	−6.8
Liberal Democrats hold		Swing		
