= Blanchman's Farm =

Nature reserve in Surrey, United Kingdom

Coordinates: 51.305°N 0.052°W

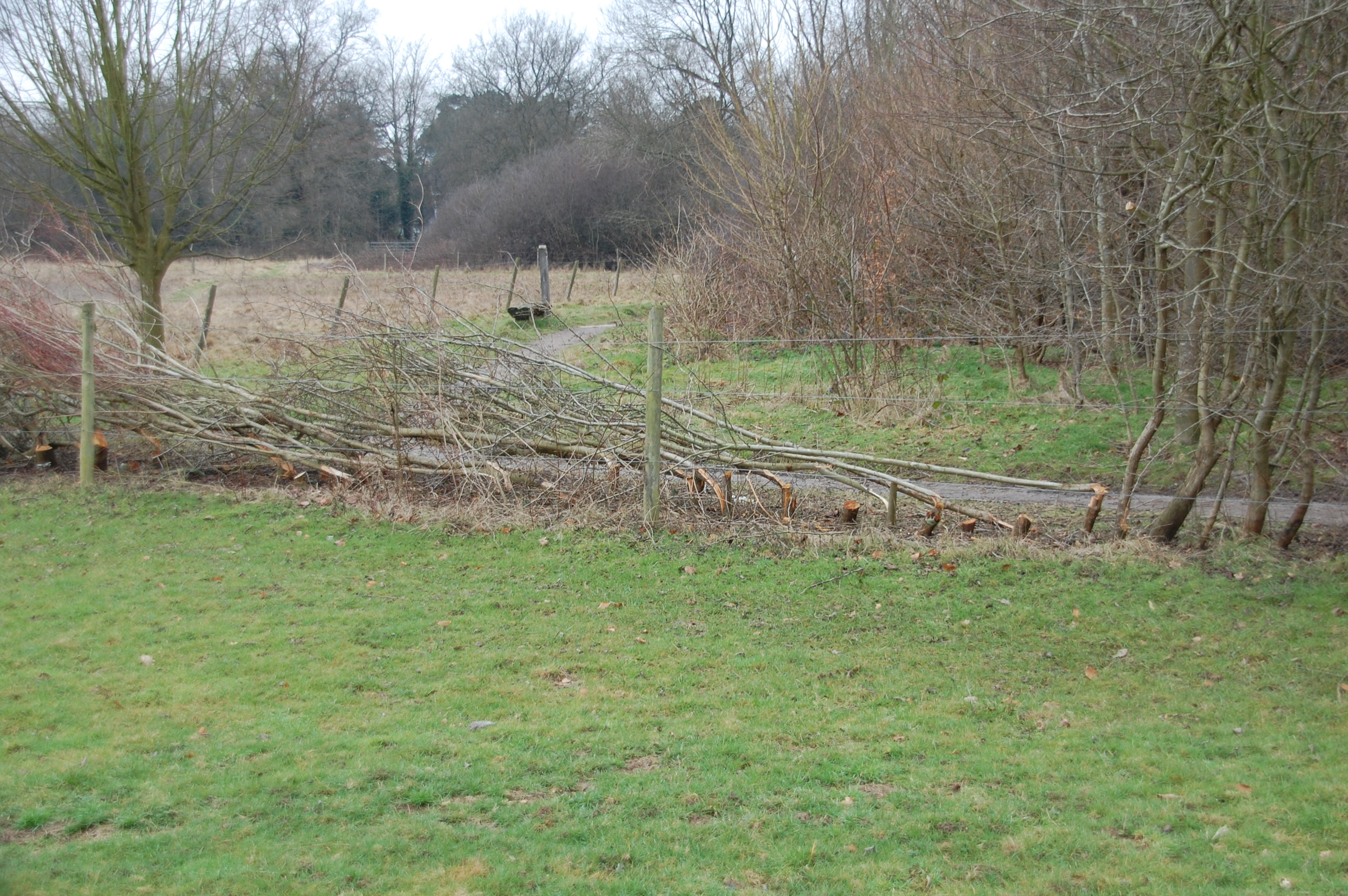
- Interactive map of Blanchman's Farm
- Type: Local Nature Reserve
- Location: Warlingham, Surrey
- OS grid: TQ 359 580
- Area: 9.4 hectares (23 acres)
- Manager: Blanchman‟s Farm Committee and the Downlands Countryside Project

Blanchman's Farm is a 9.4-hectare (23-acre) Local Nature Reserve in Warlingham in Surrey. It is owned by Tandridge District Council and managed by the Blanchman's Farm Committee and the Downlands Countryside Project.

This site has woodland, two meadows, a pond and an orchard. Fauna include foxes, roe deer, wood mice and black hairstreak butterflies.

There is access from Limpsfield Road.

== History ==
The earliest surviving records of Blanchman's Farm date from the 16th century. In the mid-19th century, it was part of a 17 ha (41-acre) estate owned by Edmund Batley Benyon. The area known as the Thrift Fields, around 6.5 ha (16 acres), was purchased by George Wren in June 1885 and remained in private ownership until October 1935, when it was bought by Surrey County Council. The Thrift Fields were used for Home Guard training exercises during the Second World War. In 1944, a V-1 flying bomb landed there and the resulting blast damaged houses in Warren Park.

The rest of Benyon's estate remained intact until 1922, when the owners of Mayes Place bought part of land adjacent to their property. The Caterham and Warlingham Urban District Council acquired the rest of land in 1935, after which it was rented to local farmers for grazing.

Work to improve Blanchman's Farm for wildlife began in 1991 and, by the mid-1990s, a pond had been re-excavated and 6000 trees had been planted. A project to improve disabled access to the site was undertaken in 1998. The site became a Local Nature Reserve in 2006 and a community orchard was established in 2011. A new trackway, suitable for wheelchair and mobility scooter users, was completed in February 2024.

== Art ==
An oil painting of Blanchman's Farm, dated 1913, by Charles Langton Lockton (1856-1932) is held by Warlingham Library.
