= 2004 Tandridge District Council election =

2004 UK local government election

Map of the results of the 2004 Tandridge District Council election. Conservatives in blue, Liberal Democrats in yellow and Labour in red. Wards in grey were not contested in 2004.

The 2004 Tandridge District Council election took place on 10 June 2004 to elect members of Tandridge District Council in Surrey, England. One third of the council was up for election and the Conservative Party stayed in overall control of the council.

After the election, the composition of the council was:

- Conservative: 28
- Liberal Democrat: 11
- Labour: 2
- Independent: 1

== Election result ==
Overall turnout at the election was 46.25%.

Tandridge local election result 2004
Party	Seats	Gains	Losses	Net gain/loss	Seats %	Votes %	Votes	+/−
Conservative	10	1	1	0	66.7	50.8	11,099	+1.3%
Liberal Democrats	4	1	0	+1	26.7	32.2	7,038	-5.5%
Labour	1	0	1	-1	6.7	8.2	1,797	+1.5%
UKIP	0	0	0	0	0	8.8	1,921	+5.4%

== Ward results ==
Bletchingley and Nuffield
Party	Candidate	Votes	%	±%
Conservative	M Myland	1,104	59.9	−1.2
Liberal Democrats	R Fowler	394	21.4	−9.9
UKIP	I Crabb	218	11.8	+11.8
Labour	P Young	126	6.8	−0.8
Majority		710	38.5	+8.7
Turnout		1,842	42.4	+10.9
Conservative hold		Swing		

Burstow, Horne and Outwood
Party	Candidate	Votes	%	±%
Conservative	R Jones	962	54.3	−5.2
Liberal Democrats	J Brock	412	23.3	−17.2
UKIP	G Bailey	397	22.4	+22.4
Majority		550	31.0	+12.0
Turnout		1,771	41.0	+12.4
Conservative hold		Swing		

Felbridge
Party	Candidate	Votes	%	±%
Conservative	K Harwood	601	75.4	+4.4
Liberal Democrats	R O'Brien	135	16.9	−12.1
UKIP	D Milne	61	7.7	+7.7
Majority		466	58.5	+16.5
Turnout		797	51.9	+16.9
Conservative hold		Swing		

Godstone
Party	Candidate	Votes	%	±%
Conservative	J Gascoigne	937	48.2	−4.7
Liberal Democrats	S Paterson	593	30.5	−9.5
UKIP	E Fisher	282	14.5	+14.5
Labour	M Mathews	134	6.9	+0.8
Majority		344	17.7	+5.8
Turnout		1,946	45.2	+7.3
Conservative hold		Swing		

Harestone
Party	Candidate	Votes	%	±%
Conservative	M Cooper	837	61.5	+7.3
Liberal Democrats	D Martin	523	38.5	−7.3
Majority		314	23.0	+14.6
Turnout		1,360	48.5	+6.6
Conservative hold		Swing		

Oxted North and Tandridge
Party	Candidate	Votes	%	±%
Conservative	G Keymer	1,181	57.9	
Liberal Democrats	M Griffiths	636	31.2	
UKIP	J Stone	224	11.0	
Majority		545	26.7	
Turnout		2,041	50.0	+9.5
Conservative hold		Swing		

Oxted South
Party	Candidate	Votes	%	±%
Conservative	E Parker	864	37.4	+4.8
Labour	B Harling	825	35.7	−5.2
Liberal Democrats	C Lewis	330	14.3	−0.7
UKIP	A Stone	294	12.7	+1.2
Majority		39	1.7	
Turnout		2,313	55.7	+6.5
Conservative gain from Labour		Swing		

Portley
Party	Candidate	Votes	%	±%
Liberal Democrats	H Turner	791	60.9	+2.4
Conservative	F Bright	508	39.1	−2.4
Majority		283	21.8	+4.8
Turnout		1,299	44.9	+7.9
Liberal Democrats hold		Swing		

Queens Park
Party	Candidate	Votes	%	±%
Liberal Democrats	J Orrick	824	53.0	+6.6
Conservative	D Hodge	730	47.0	−1.3
Majority		94	6.0	
Turnout		1,554	57.1	
Liberal Democrats gain from Conservative		Swing		

Valley
Party	Candidate	Votes	%	±%
Labour	P Longhurst	413	32.5	+10.6
Liberal Democrats	C Daly	383	30.2	−22.4
Conservative	N Marks	340	26.8	+1.3
UKIP	M Bowes	133	10.5	+10.5
Majority		30	2.3	
Turnout		1,269	46.1	+7.9
Labour hold		Swing		

Warlingham East, Chelsham and Farleigh
Party	Candidate	Votes	%	±%
Liberal Democrats	J Pursehouse	675	38.5	−12.8
Conservative	D Cooley	648	37.0	+1.9
UKIP	M Haley	312	17.8	+4.2
Labour	B Garwood	118	6.7	+6.7
Majority		27	1.5	−14.7
Turnout		1,753	43.7	+8.6
Liberal Democrats hold		Swing		

Warlingham West
Party	Candidate	Votes	%	±%
Conservative	R Allen	824	69.7	+1.6
Liberal Democrats	R James	358	30.3	+3.6
Majority		466	39.4	−2.0
Turnout		1,182	46.2	
Conservative hold		Swing		

Westway
Party	Candidate	Votes	%	±%
Conservative	S Altria	521	55.8	+5.5
Liberal Democrats	D Gosling	232	24.8	+11.4
Labour	R Clements	181	19.4	−16.9
Majority		289	31.0	+17.0
Turnout		934	34.5	
Conservative hold		Swing		

Whyteleafe
Party	Candidate	Votes	%	±%
Liberal Democrats	J Gray	627	64.6	+8.1
Conservative	M Frankcom	343	35.4	−2.3
Majority		284	29.2	+10.4
Turnout		970	37.9	
Liberal Democrats hold		Swing		

Woldingham
Party	Candidate	Votes	%	±%
Conservative	R Butcher	699	84.8	
Liberal Democrats	L Martin	125	15.2	
Majority		574	69.6	
Turnout		824	55.3	
Conservative hold		Swing		

== By-elections between 2004 and 2006 ==
=== Chaldon ===
Chaldon by-election 5 May 2005
Party	Candidate	Votes	%	±%
Conservative	Christina Fry	622	63.1	−5.7
Liberal Democrats	Catherine Tomlin	363	36.9	+5.7
Majority		259	26.2	−11.4
Turnout		985	71.2	+33.5
Conservative hold		Swing		

=== Limpsfield ===
Limpsfield by-election 5 May 2005
Party	Candidate	Votes	%	±%
Conservative	Colin Walker	1,271	64.5	+4.3
Liberal Democrats	Mark Wilson	699	35.5	+0.1
Majority		572	29.0	+4.2
Turnout		1,970	73.3	+31.7
Conservative hold		Swing		
