= 2021 Tandridge District Council election =

2021 UK local government election

Map showing the results of the 2021 Tandridge District Council election

The 2021 Tandridge District Council election took place on 6 May 2021 to elect members of Tandridge District Council in England. This was on the same day as other local elections.

== Ward results ==
Asterisk indicates incumbent Councillor seeking re-election.

=== Bletchingley & Nutfield ===
Bletchingley & Nutfield
Party	Candidate	Votes	%	±%
Conservative	Liam Hammond	815	43	▼2
Independent	Chris Pinard	606	32	▲32
Liberal Democrats	Richard Fowler	303	16	▼6
Labour	Linda Baharier	158	8	▲1.5
Majority		209	11	▼10
Turnout		1,888	40.17	▲5
Conservative hold		Swing		

=== Burstow, Horne & Outwood ===
Burstow, Horne & Outwood
Party	Candidate	Votes	%	±%
Independent	Mick Gillman	691	41	▼1
Conservative	Harry Fitzgerald*	667	39	▲2
Liberal Democrats	Judy Wilkinson	127	7	▼1
Independent	Andrea Moss	107	6	▲6
Green	Jack Baart	105	6	▼2
Majority		24	2	▼3
Turnout		1,705	33.63	▼1
Independent gain from Conservative		Swing		

=== Chaldon ===
Chaldon
Party	Candidate	Votes	%	±%
Conservative	Phil Flower	431	61	▼8
Liberal Democrats	Neil Parker	262	37	▲18
Majority		169	24	▼26
Turnout		1,470	48.4	▼2
Conservative hold		Swing		

=== Godstone ===
Godstone
Party	Candidate	Votes	%	±%
Independent	Mike Crane	1,104	61	▲12
Conservative	Eileen Blake-Thomas*	451	25	▲11
Liberal Democrats	Martin Redman	120	7	▲3
Labour	Barbara Wantling	120	7	▲3
Majority		653	36	▼23
Turnout		1,802	37.69	▼4
Independent gain from Conservative		Swing		

=== Harestone ===
Harestone
Party	Candidate	Votes	%	±%
Conservative	Michael Cooper*	581	40	▼14
Liberal Democrats	Annette Evans	557	39	▲20
Independent	Clare Heaton	187	13	▲13
Labour	Anita Mills	114	8	▼4
Majority		24	1	▼15
Turnout		1,452	44.7	▲3
Conservative hold		Swing		

=== Oxted North & Tandridge ===
Oxted North & Tandridge
Party	Candidate	Votes	%	±%
Oxted & Limpsfield Residents' Group	Jackie Wren*	1,779	77	▲10
Conservative	Alex Standen	324	14	▼11
Liberal Democrats	Rupert McCann	119	13	▲13
Labour	Jonathan Wheale	81	3	
Majority		1,455	63	▲21
Turnout		2,316	48.2	▼1
Oxted & Limpsfield Residents' Group hold		Swing		

=== Oxted South ===
Oxted South
Party	Candidate	Votes	%	±%
Oxted & Limpsfield Residents' Group	Deb Shiner	1,048	50	▼13
Conservative	Elizabeth Parker*	709	34	▲17
Labour	Samuel Kerr	243	12	▲5
Liberal Democrats	Martin Caxton	78	4	▼2
Majority		339	17	▼29
Turnout		2,086	41.14	▼1
Oxted & Limpsfield Residents' Group gain from Conservative				

=== Portley ===
Portley
Party	Candidate	Votes	%	±%
Liberal Democrats	Chris Botten*	682	54	▼2
Conservative	Maria Grasso	458	36	▲10
Labour	Ian Giddings	105	8	▲1
Majority		224	18	▼12
Turnout		1,258	35.1	▲4
Liberal Democrats hold		Swing		

=== Queen's Park ===
Queen's Park (2)
Party	Candidate	Votes	%	±%
Conservative	Matthew Groves	575	45	
Conservative	Geoffrey Duck*	561	44	
Liberal Democrats	Vicky Robinson	496	39	
Liberal Democrats	James Rujbally	376	29	
Labour	Roy Stewart	126	10	
Labour	Roger Vince	96	8	
Majority		65	5	
Turnout		1,595	43	▼1
Conservative hold		Swing		
Conservative gain from Liberal Democrats		Swing		

=== Valley ===
Valley (2)
Party	Candidate	Votes	%	±%
Liberal Democrats	Jenny Gaffney	645	60	
Liberal Democrats	Alun Jones*	606	56	
Conservative	Victor Emmanuel	271	25	
Conservative	David Knight	263	24	
Labour	Caz Lessey	99	9	
Labour	Wayne Chuter	81	7	
Independent	Peter Roberts	78	7	
	Jeffrey Bolter	59	5	
Majority		335	31	
Turnout		1,081	32.6	▲1
Liberal Democrats hold		Swing		
Liberal Democrats hold		Swing		

=== Warlingham East, Chelsham & Farleigh ===
Warlingham East, Chelsham & Farleigh
Party	Candidate	Votes	%	±%
Independent	Jeremy Pursehouse*	1,057	59	▲11
Conservative	Nathan Adams	458	26	▼1
Labour	Mark Wilson	130	7	▲1
Independent	Martin Haley	126	7	▼11
Majority		599	33	▲5
Turnout		1,806	38.3	
Independent hold		Swing		

=== Warlingham West ===
Warlingham West
Party	Candidate	Votes	%	±%
Conservative	Keith Prew	726	60	▼2
Liberal Democrats	Neill Cooper	405	33	▲6
Labour	David Manning	66	5	▼2
Majority		321	27	▼7
Turnout		1,210	40.37	▲5
Conservative hold		Swing		

=== Westway ===
Westway
Party	Candidate	Votes	%	±%
Conservative	Taylor O'Driscoll	491	40	▲5
Liberal Democrats	Helen Rujbally*	476	39	▼3
Labour	Robin Clements	186	15	▼5
Independent	Helena Windsor	67	5	▲5
Majority		15	1	▼6
Turnout		1,231	33.51	
Conservative gain from Liberal Democrats		Swing		

=== Whyteleafe ===
Whyteleafe
Party	Candidate	Votes	%	±%
Liberal Democrats	David Lee*	522	47	
Conservative	Sakina Bradbury	418	38	
Labour	Fatima Kamara	153	14	▲2
Majority		104	9	
Turnout		1,105	32.13	▼2
Liberal Democrats hold		Swing		

=== Woldingham ===
Woldingham
Party	Candidate	Votes	%	±%
Conservative	Carole North	479	69	▼2
Liberal Democrats	Adam Farrar-Wilson	133	19	▲12
Labour	Nathan Manning	77	11	▲4
Majority		346	50	▼7
Turnout		694	42.11	
Conservative hold		Swing		

== By-elections between 2021 and 2022 ==
=== Felbridge (17 June 2021) ===
A by-election was held in Felbridge on 17 June 2021 following the death of Conservative Councillor Ken Harwood in 2020. This was due to take place on 6 May 2021, but was postponed following the death of the Labour candidate Christopher Kelly.

Felbridge by-election 17 June 2021
Party	Candidate	Votes	%	±%
Independent	Judy Moore	264	45.4	▲45.4
Independent	Mark Taylor	159	27.4	▲27.4
Conservative	Harry Baker-Smith	128	22.0	▼43.0
Labour	Emba Jones	18	3.1	▲3.1
Liberal Democrats	Richard Fowler	12	2.1	▲2.1
Majority		105	18.0	N/A
Turnout		581	31.9	
Independent gain from Conservative		Swing		
