= 1999 Tandridge District Council election =

1999 UK local government election

The 1999 Tandridge District Council election took place on 6 May 1999 to elect members of Tandridge District Council in Surrey, England. One third of the council was up for election and the council stayed under no overall control.

After the election, the composition of the council was

- Conservative 18
- Liberal Democrat 17
- Labour 7

== Election result ==
Tandridge local election result 1999
Party	Seats	Gains	Losses	Net gain/loss	Seats %	Votes %	Votes	+/−
Liberal Democrats	6		2	-2	42.9			
Conservative	6	2		+2	42.9			
Labour	2			0	14.3			

== Ward results ==
Bletchingley
Party	Candidate	Votes	%	±%
Conservative	Sally Herrtage	476	72.7	+29.4
Labour	Maxine Mathews	115	17.6	−5.9
Liberal Democrats	Demonte P	64	9.8	−23.4
Majority		361	55.1	+44.0
Turnout		655	28.0	−14.5
Conservative hold		Swing		

Burstow, Horne and Outwood
Party	Candidate	Votes	%	±%
Liberal Democrats	Iain Pavely	777	50.1	−1.5
Conservative	Robert Jones	775	49.9	+13.2
Majority		2	0.2	−14.7
Turnout		1,552	35.2	−5.1
Liberal Democrats hold		Swing		

Chelsham & Farleigh, Tatsfield
Party	Candidate	Votes	%	±%
Conservative	Tina Fry	539	59.7	+15.0
Liberal Democrats	Terry Cartwright	313	34.7	−7.5
Labour	Lucas E.	51	5.6	−7.5
Majority		226	25.0	+22.5
Turnout		903	50.9	+3.7
Conservative hold		Swing		

Dormans
Party	Candidate	Votes	%	±%
Liberal Democrats	Win Weston	521	48.3	−9.4
Conservative	Sampson J.	506	46.9	+4.6
Labour	Jeffers E.	51	4.7	+4.7
Majority		15	1.4	−14.1
Turnout		1,078	47.2	−2.9
Liberal Democrats hold		Swing		

Felbridge
Party	Candidate	Votes	%	±%
Conservative	Ken Rimmington	413	60.4	+19.7
Liberal Democrats	Trevor Ansley	271	39.6	−19.7
Majority		2	20.8	+2.2
Turnout		684	43.5	−6.4
Conservative gain from Liberal Democrats		Swing	19.7	

Godstone
Party	Candidate	Votes	%	±%
Liberal Democrats	Colin White	938	50.3	+9.0
Conservative	Lawrence M.	788	42.3	+2.4
Labour	Wilbraham D.	139	7.5	−11.2
Majority		150	8.0	+6.6
Turnout		1,865	41.6	−9.4
Liberal Democrats hold		Swing		

Limpsfield
Party	Candidate	Votes	%	±%
Conservative	Eric Morgan	718	68.9	+5.3
Liberal Democrats	Charlotte Heijmer	249	23.9	−3.0
Labour	O'Neil J.	67	6.4	−3.1
Independent	Charles P.	8	0.8	+0.8
Majority		469	45.0	+8.2
Turnout		1,042	37.2	−9.2
Conservative hold		Swing		

Lingfield & Crowhurst
Party	Candidate	Votes	%	±%
Liberal Democrats	Alex Niven	896	52.1	−7.9
Conservative	Sander M.	709	41.2	+12.6
Labour	Lynne Bappa	114	6.6	−4.9
Majority		187	9.9	−21.5
Turnout		1,719	47.8	−1.8
Liberal Democrats hold		Swing		

Nutfield
Party	Candidate	Votes	%	±%
Conservative	Marion Myland	609	54.2	+22.0
Liberal Democrats	Brian Martin	514	45.8	−14.2
Majority		95	8.4	−19.5
Turnout		1,123	53.6	+4.0
Conservative gain from Liberal Democrats		Swing		

Nutfield ward changed from Liberal Democrat to Conservative in the 1998 by-election. Therefore, this is shown as a gain from the 1995 election.

Oxted North and Tandridge
Party	Candidate	Votes	%	±%
Conservative	Gordon Keymer	1,059	61.0	+11.9
Liberal Democrats	James Curtin	534	30.7	−12.1
Labour	Mahon D.	111	6.4	−1.7
Independent	Speczyk S.	33	1.9	+1.9
Majority		525	30.3	+23.9
Turnout		1,737	41.3	−15.7
Conservative hold		Swing		

Oxted South
Party	Candidate	Votes	%	±%
Labour	Marian West	1,038	48.1	−5.0
Conservative	Barry Compton	884	41.0	+5.4
Liberal Democrats	Mark Wilson	235	10.9	+10.9
Majority		154	7.1	−10.3
Turnout		2,311	51.0	−4.9
Labour hold		Swing		

Portley
Party	Candidate	Votes	%	±%
Liberal Democrats	Hilary Turner	618	53.3	+8.6
Conservative	Randall H.	487	42.0	−0.2
Labour	Voisey T.	54	4.7	−8.4
Majority		131	11.3	+8.8
Turnout		1,159	46.7	+3.0
Liberal Democrats hold		Swing		

Valley
Party	Candidate	Votes	%	±%
Labour	Peter Longhurst	515	37.2	−5.1
Liberal Democrats	Jill Caudle	464	33.6	−3.1
Conservative	Jackie Servant	404	29.2	+8.2
Majority		51	3.6	−2.2
Turnout		1,383	49.2	−6.3
Labour hold		Swing		

Warlingham East
Party	Candidate	Votes	%	±%
Liberal Democrats	Ashley Burridge	675	48.5	−2.4
Conservative	Sheena Seagrave	557	40.0	+12.7
Labour	Robert Jaques	161	11.6	−10.1
Majority		118	8.5	−15.1
Turnout		1,393	39.6	−5.2
Liberal Democrats hold		Swing		
