= Chelsham =

Village in Surrey, England

Coordinates: 51.31666°N 0.016666°W

- The water tower of the former Warlingham Park Hospital

- Location within Surrey
- OS grid reference: TQ383593
- Civil parish: Chelsham and Farleigh
- District: Tandridge
- Shire county: Surrey
- Region: South East
- Country: England
- Sovereign state: United Kingdom
- Post town: Warlingham
- Postcode district: CR6
- Dialling code: 01883
- Police: Surrey
- Fire: Surrey
- Ambulance: South East Coast
- UK Parliament: East Surrey

Chelsham is a village and former civil parish, now in the parish of Chelsham and Farleigh and the Tandridge district of Surrey, England. It is located in the Metropolitan Green Belt, 15.3 miles (24.6 km) from London, 3 miles (4.8 km) from Oxted and 23.8 miles (38.3 km) from Guildford. In 1961 the parish had a population of 1285.

== History ==
=== Early history ===
Flint implements and flakes are not uncommon in Warlingham and Chelsham: evidence of a Neolithic population frequenting the area.

Near Chelsham Court Farm are the foundations and walls of a Romano-British villa.

=== Dark, Middle Ages and post-Reformation ===
The village lay within the Anglo-Saxon feudal division of Tandridge hundred when Chelsham appeared in the Domesday Book of 1086 as Celesham, held by Robert de Wateville from Richard de Clare, just one of his many local pseudonyms. Its domesday assets were: 1 church, 11 ploughs, from customary dues 1 hog. It rendered £15.

Three manors existed at times: Chelsham Watevile; Chelsham, also known as Chelsham Court; and Chelsham Le Holt, also known as Rowholt. Medieval earthworks in Holt Wood and Henley Wood are thought to be associated with these.

On 1 April 1969 the parish was abolished to form "Chelsham and Farleigh".

=== Chelsham Watervile ===
From first being held by Robert de Watevile of de Clare (in return for a rent and fealty) its tenancy passed to Walter de Godstone in 1284. The overlordship remained in the Clare family until the death of Gilbert de Clare Earl of Gloucester without issue in 1314; one third of the estates taken by Hugh le Despenser (from one of Gilbert's three sisters) included this manor, passing down the family Beauchamps and Nevills to King Richard III through his wife. To this manor, the manors of Chelsham Court and Titsey paid annual rents of 4s. and 6s. respectively with suits of court, reliefs and heriots, and Bardolf's Court paid yearly a bushel of grain called Park Corn as at 1428. In 1455 a sale took place to Sir Thomas Cook, a draper and Alderman of the City of London, who mortgaged it to Robert Harding, goldsmith, could not pay most and who then became lord of this manor; his son who inherited William Harding, merchant of London, died in 1549. His daughter Helen who married Richard Knyvett may have passed it to Helen's sister husband, that is Katherine Harding's husband Richard Onslow, who was not Richard Onslow (Parliamentarian). In any case, it became united in the 17th century with the Uvedales who ran Chelsham Court.

=== Chelsham Court ===
In 1306 Reginald de Chelsham and Dionisia his wife were holding the manor. Andrew Peverel inherited it from next owner John de Ifield. In 1428 John Uvedale had already acquired Chelsham Court. Knight Sir William Uvedale died here 1525. (Note: Written in the Old Style dates in January 1524–5 – this means in modern translation January 1524; the year did not use to end until Lady Day in March.) Four younger sons shared a £20 per year annuity each as an elder Uvedale brother inherited, one of these was Richard Uvedale, one of these younger sons, described as of Chilling, Hampshire and Chelsham Court, Surrey was implicated in the Dudley conspiracy in Mary I of England's reign. A great-grandson gave what remained to Sir Edward Banister to pay his debts after his death, from whom two male trustees held for Harman Atwood of Sanderstead, whose family held it for over a three centuries, despite making Sanderstead their principal estate; thereafter on male heirs failing, their heirs the Wigsells held it. Esmé Francis Wigsell Arkwright held it in 1911.

=== Rowholt ===
This small manor passed, by heirs' confirmation of their father's gift, in 1243–4 to Tonbridge Priory. They ran this small estate but the priory was suppressed by Cardinal Thomas Wolsey under a bull of Pope Clement VII dated September 1524 for the endowment of his foundation of Cardinal College, Oxford and this manor was granted to him by Henry VIII in January 1526. On Wolsey's fall from grace, for a brief period Henry granted it in a land-swap to Sheen Priory, until he dissolved that priory in 1539; when its tenant William Hardyng, who paid a rent of 13s. 4d. and a red rose. In 1539 this rent was granted by the king to John Gresham, and in 1545 the manor of Rowholt was sold to Gresham, now Sir John Gresham of London. On his death in 1556 it passed to his wife Katherine and their son William, Beatrice widow of the latter holding it in 1604. By a deed dated 9 January 1598 she had settled it after her death on her daughter Cicely, wife of Sir Henry Woodhouse, for life, with remainder to Cicely's son Gresham Woodhouse. Later the estate was sold in parcels to various people, about 120 acres being now part of Chelsham Court Farm. The house formerly known as Rowholt is now called Ledgers Park or Ledgers Farm. The present house is Victorian, but close to it are the remains of a moat round the site of an older house.

=== Post-Industrial Revolution ===
Warlingham Common, a large tract of common land was inclosed in 1866 and extended into Chelsham.

A small estate of detached and semi-detached houses now occupy that land that was once the site of Warlingham Park Hospital, built as Croydon Mental Hospital in 1903 on the borders of the north of the parish. It cost £200,000 to lay out grounds and erect the buildings, including the iconic central tower which is the only edifice that still stands. In 1911 gravel diggings were present as a form of small industry within the Worms Heath and Elmes & Son had plant nurseries at Langhurst. Its most important homes were Ledgers Park and Chelsham Lodge, as by 1911 Chelsham Place had become a farmhouse.

== Geography ==
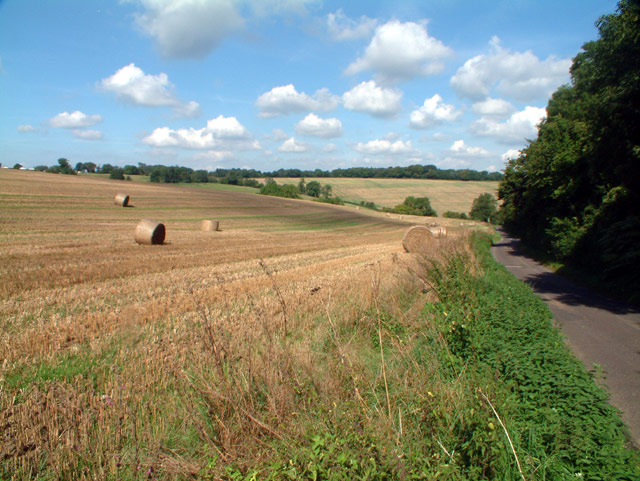
Typical Chelsham countryside at Beddlestead Lane

Together with Farleigh the total population of the civil parish was 356 as measured by the 2001 census.

Chelsham lies high and commands views for a long distance, including over London, from the centre of which it is 15.3 miles (24.6 km) south by south-east. Though in parts well wooded, the area is generally somewhat barren and featureless in the nearer landscape. The administrative centre of the district, Oxted, is 3 miles (4.8 km) due south, below the uplands upon which Chelsham lies, and Guildford, the county town, is 23.8 miles (38.3 km) west by south-west. Croydon is 6 miles (9.7 km) NNW. The highest point of the North Downs Area of Outstanding Natural Beauty is a slight, gentle rise, about three miles south of the village along Croydon Road at Botley Hill.

A large triangular village green, bounded by two roads, named Bull Green, is managed by the parish council and hosts annual events.

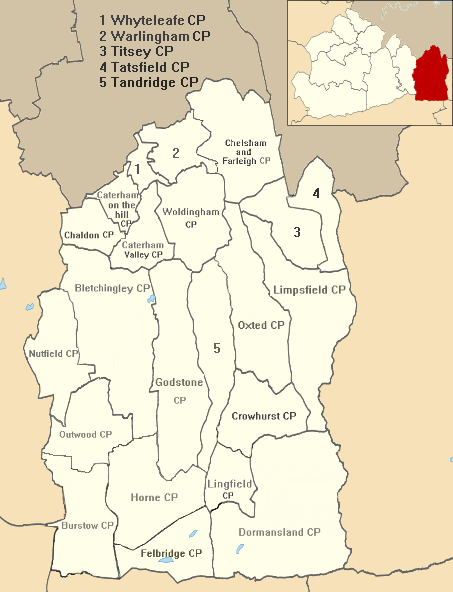
map showing the position of Chelsham (within the most northern civil parish) of Tandridge

=== Elevations ===
Elevations vary from 251m AOD towards the south-east, highest on the border with Titsey to the middle of a deep crevasse/ravine in the east, traversed by Hester's Hill/Beddlestead Leane at 145m AOD

== Local government ==
Five of the seven parish councillors represent Chelsham and the clerk is Michelle Richards.

Surrey County Council, headquartered in Kingston, elected every four years, has one representative of the area. Becky Rush, Deputy leader of the county council is its representative as Chelsham and Farleigh are within the Surrey Council Council ward of Warlingham.

| First Elected | Member | Ward |
|---|---|---|
| 2019 | Becky Rush | Warlingham |

Chelsham and Farleigh share in three representative on Tandridge District Council, headquartered in Oxted:

| Election | Member | Ward |
|---|---|---|
| 2010 | Simon Morrow | Warlingham East & Chelsham & Farleigh |
| 2012 | Jeremy Pursehouse | Warlingham East & Chelsham & Farleigh |
| 2019 | Celia Caulcott | Warlingham East & Chelsham & Farleigh |

== Landmarks ==
=== St Leonard’s Church ===
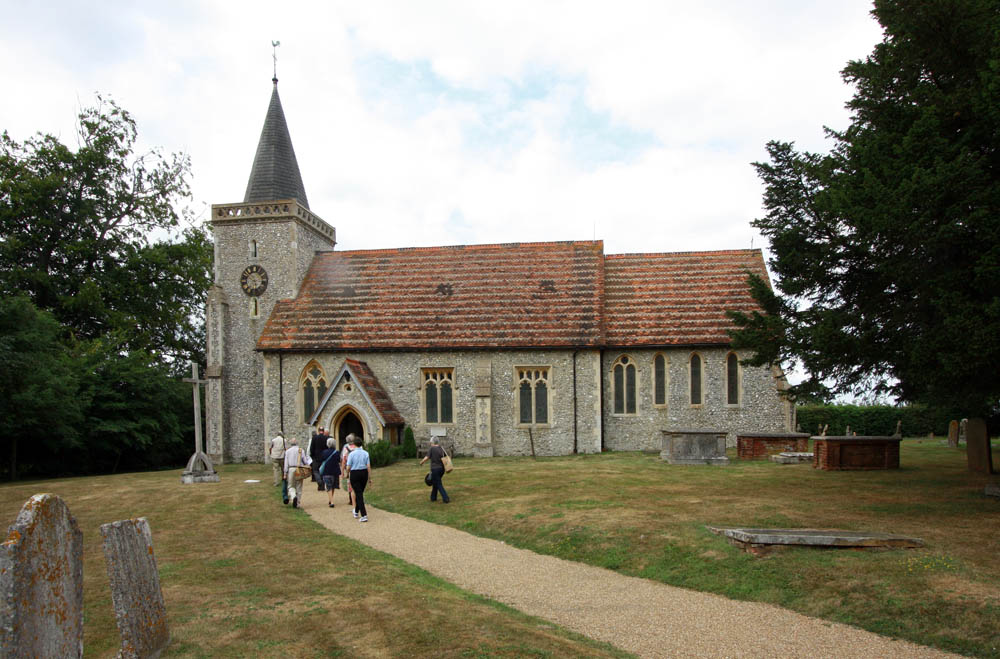
Exterior of Church

Other than the historic manors mentioned, there are more than 10 other listed buildings and monuments across the village. The Church of St Leonard is a 13th-century church largely rebuilt in the 19th century. It was built to serve the farms in Chelsham, and still sits in farmland in the centre of the roads and bridle ways of the parish. In addition to the regular services, there is a yearly cycle of services celebrating the farming year and creation, starting with a Plough Sunday service in January, and including services for Rogation, Lammas and Harvest Festival.

During the year there are other special services, including services to remember all those who have been baptized and married at the church, an Animal Blessing service, a service to remember the departed, and the Kelly service to remember the charitable giving of a local man who became Lord Mayor of London and who is buried in the churchyard. There are also Taizé services on some evenings. The rector is the Revd Michelle Edmonds.
