= Warlingham =

Village and parish in Surrey, England

Coordinates: 51.30949°N 0.05736°W

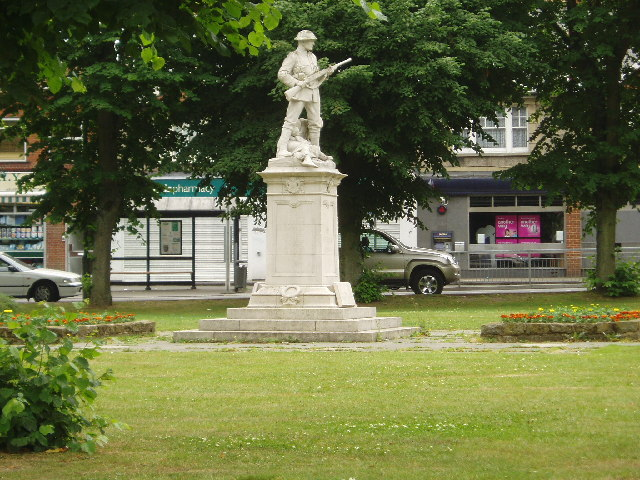
- The Green and The War Memorial

- Location within Surrey
- Area: 6.02 km^{2} (2.32 sq mi)
- Population: 8,036 (Civil Parish 2011)
  - Density: 1,335/km^{2} (3,460/sq mi)
- OS grid reference: TQ355585
- Civil parish: Warlingham
- District: Tandridge
- Shire county: Surrey
- Region: South East
- Country: England
- Sovereign state: United Kingdom
- Post town: Warlingham
- Postcode district: CR6
- Dialling code: 01883
- Police: Surrey
- Fire: Surrey
- Ambulance: South East Coast
- UK Parliament: East Surrey

Warlingham is a village and civil parish in the Tandridge district of Surrey, England, 14 miles (23 km) south of London and 22 miles (35 km) east of Guildford. Warlingham is the centre of a civil parish that includes Hamsey Green to the north. Caterham is 2 miles (3.2 km) to the southwest.

== Toponymy ==
The name "Warlingham" is first recorded as Warlyngham in 1144 and first appears with the modern spelling in 1198. Other medieval variants include Warlinggeham (c. 1200), Werlingham (1263) and Worlingham (1291). The name is generally agreed have its origins in Old English and to mean "the home(stead) (‑ham) of the followers (‑(l)ing) of Wærla".

== History ==
=== Early history, Dark Ages and Middle Ages ===
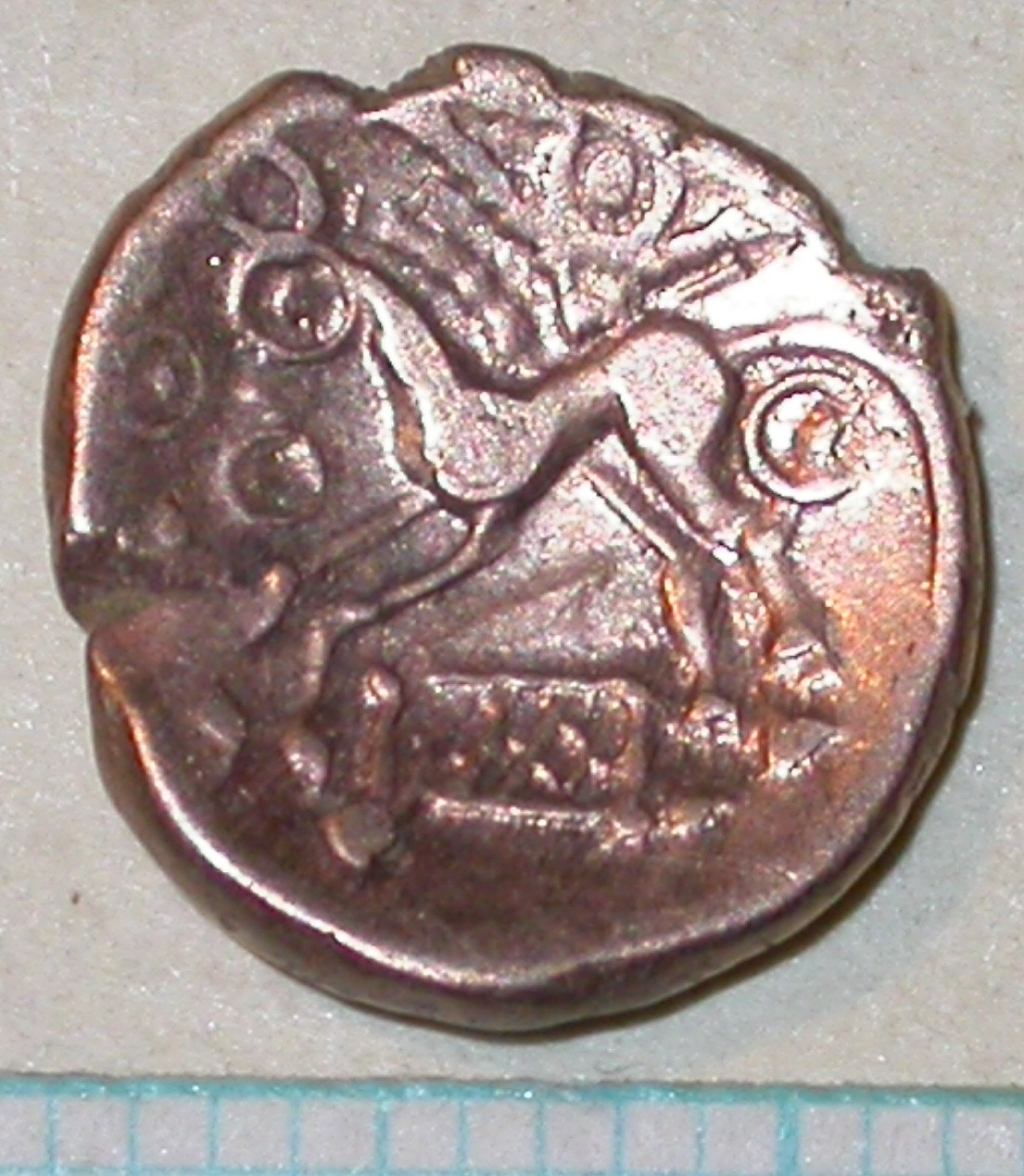
A gold, Iron Age quarter stater coin, found in Warlingham in 2003 and dated to c. 50 – c. 1 BCE

Flint implements are not uncommon, and reputed eoliths have been found in the pebble beds near the village centre. In 1909 several cinerary urns of late Celtic date were found near the road towards Worms Heath; one of them contained bones. In several places are depressions which may have been pit houses. Two of these are in the grounds of Bryn Cottage.

The village lay within the Anglo-Saxon administrative division of Tandridge hundred.

Its rectorial estate, glebe and rectory was from early times acquired by the manor, which was held by a priory, that of Bermondsey; held with the manor until a 1675 gift to trustees by Harmon Atwood.

=== Manors ===
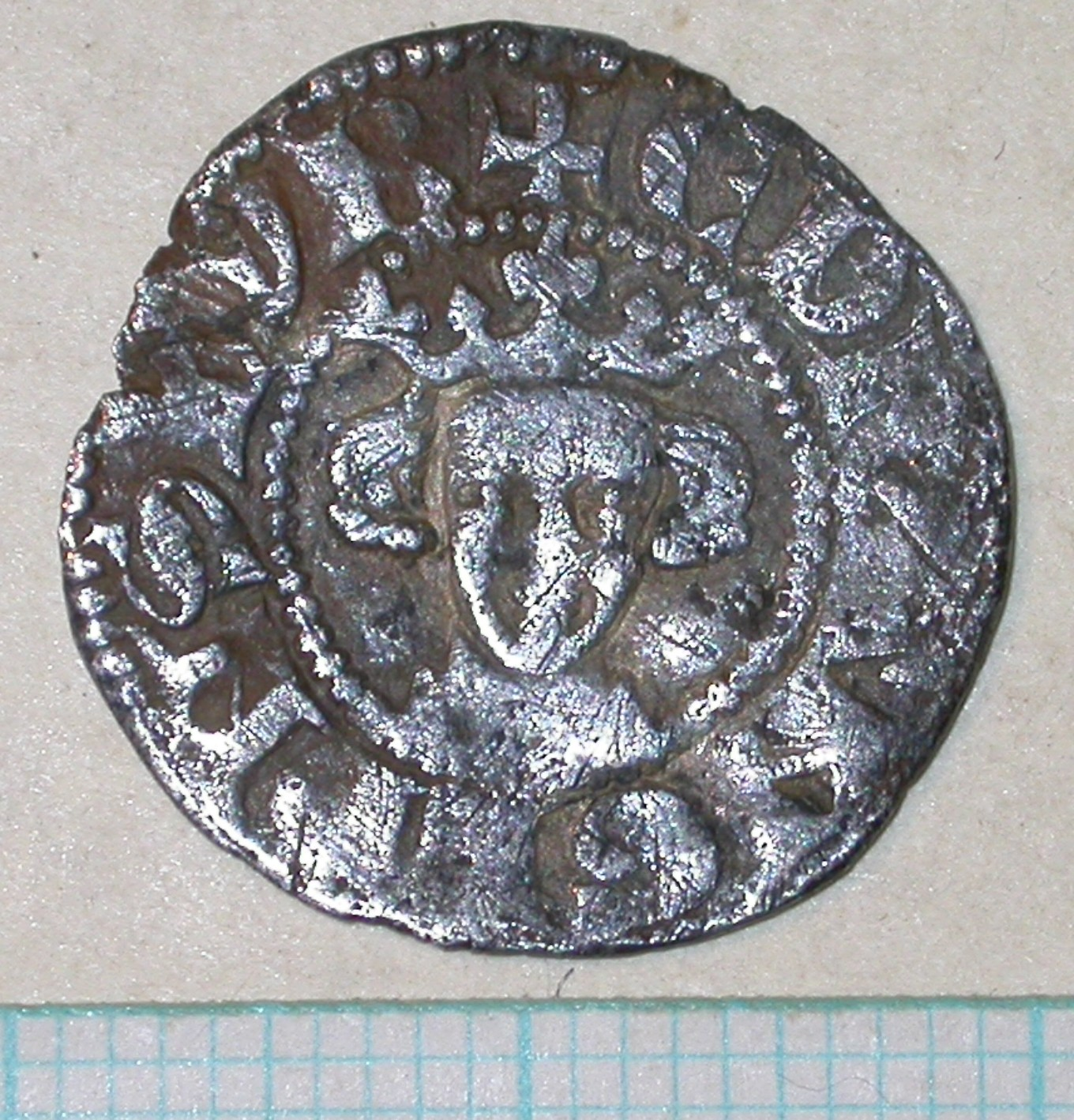
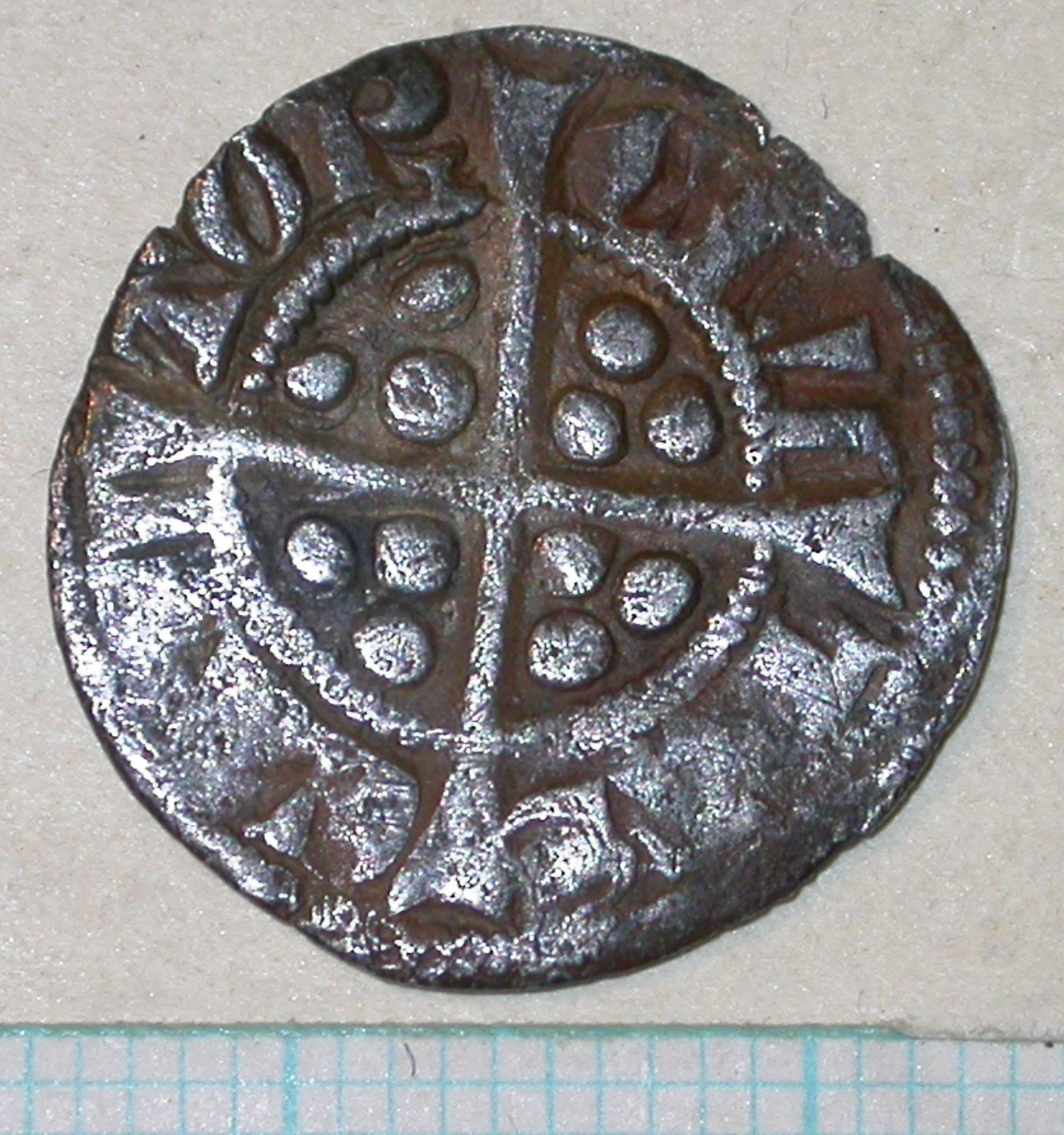
The front (left) and back faces of a silver penny of Edward I, found in Warlingham in 2003 and minted c. 1272 – c. 1307.

Three manors owned virtually all of the land: Warlingham, Crewes/Carewes and Westhall.

Warlingham Manor

Warlingham Manor was assigned by William de Watevile in 1144 to Bermondsey Priory, which held it until the Dissolution of the Monasteries, subject to certain retained rights to the de Watevile, later de Godstone family. In the 13th century, a lawsuit with the Abbey of Hyde over the boundary of their Sanderstead manor took place. Immediately after the ecclesiastic Reformation in 1544, Sir John Gresham, who made large loans to the state, was, subject to a few years' more rent from its senior tenants being retained by the Crown, granted the whole estate. (Note: Richard Wooden of Warlingham and John Cater of London, vintner shared a 21-year lease running from 14 April 1541.) In 1591 his grandson sold it to John Ownstead, though this was not done until Elizabeth I received her fine for her licence on conveyance (equivalent to a stamp duty on landed estates; legally imposed as overlord) for transferring the property. Later this manor descended to Rev. Atwood Wigsell of Sanderstead Court in the 18th century and remained in that family until at least 1911.

Crewes Manor

In 1353 permission was given to Sir Richard Willoughby and his wife to grant to William and Nicholas Carew the manor of Beddington at a yearly rent of 20 marks. They retained to themselves the manor of Warlingham, a part that was later known as Carew's and, later still, as Crewe's manor. A royal grant of free warren followed in 1375 to the lord of this manor. Later medieval owners included the Huscarl, Delamere and Saunders families leading up to the Dissolution/Reformation. Sir Edmund Walsingham's son was left the manor by his sister who married the then owner, Sir Thomas Walsingham, from whom it passed to his second son who sold it. Its purchaser was Edward Weston, who was followed as owner by Garrett Weston, and his son-in-law, Michael Wilkins, who sold Crewes in 1644. Only two years later Humphrey Gould sold it to Richard Rochdale, citizen and brewer of London. His heirs sold it to John Pemberton, who later sold the manor to John Heathfield the elder, a brewer of Croydon, in whose family it remained until 1804 when it was purchased by William Coles of Addington. By 1808, however, Charles Pieschall was lord of the manor, and after this the Smith family of Selsdon held it until at least 1911.

Westhall Manor

William Rede exchanged his Oatlands Palace for Tandridge Priory including this manor with King Henry VIII. However, he died before the grant was completed, leaving as heir his infant son John Rede to whom the king on 2 January 1538 granted the priory of Tandridge, including the manor of Warlingham or Westhall. Sir Robert Clayton of Marden, Godstone and of Bletchingley held this from 1674 to 1707. His nephew, Sir William Clayton, inherited his estates and, after this, the manor continued to be held by the Claytons with the manor of Bletchingley, until the estate was subdivided.

==== History of the church ====
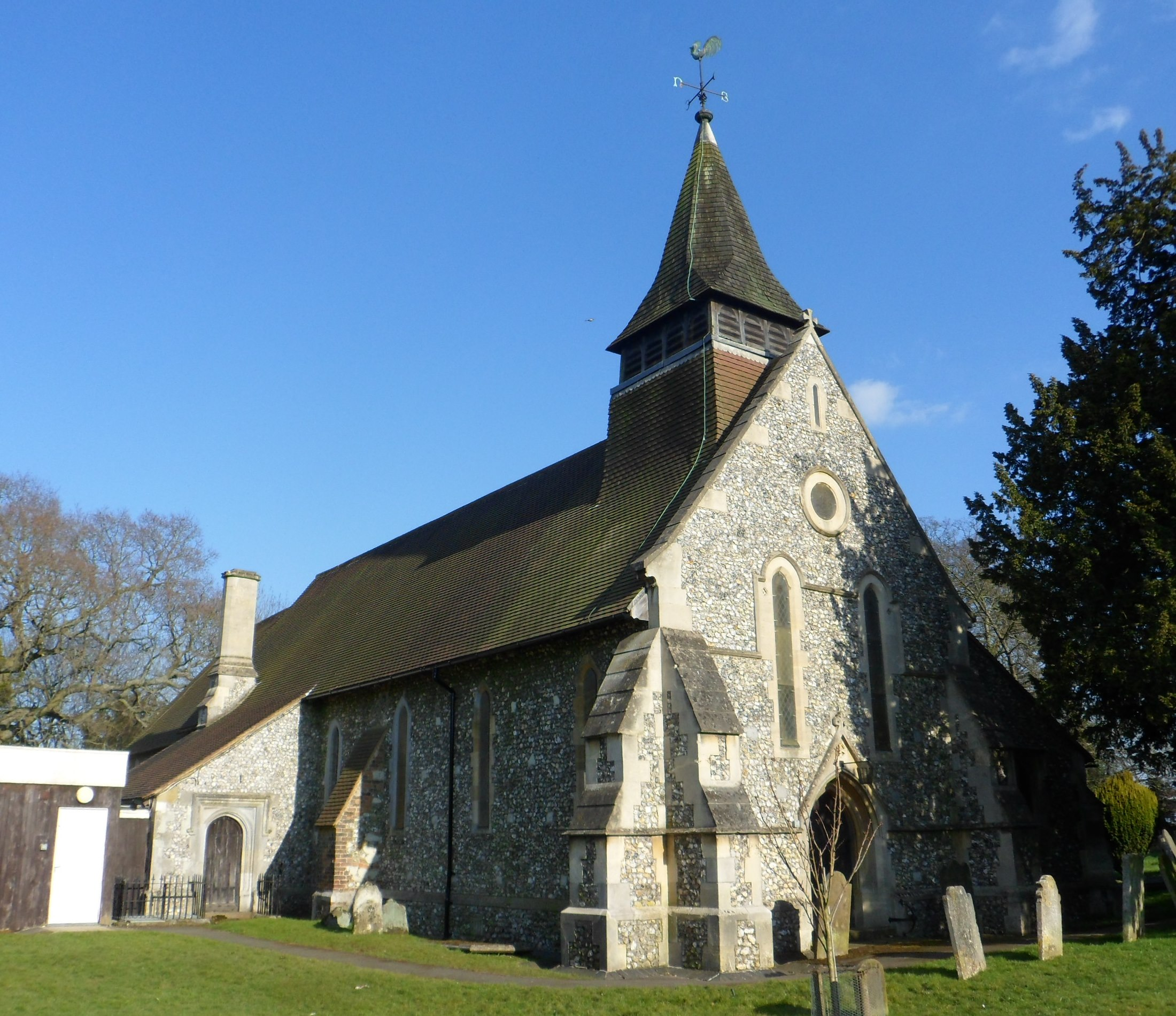
All Saints' Church

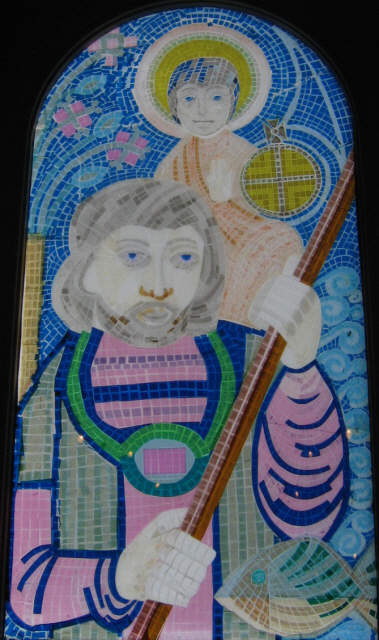
Mosaic window, St Christopher's Church, the Second Anglican Church in Warlingham

All Saints' Church's present building dates back to around the year 1250. (Note: Malden, see above, says the building is of about 1240. Its listed building entry reads "Church. 1250, restored in 1857 by G. Scott and in 1887 by P.M. Johnston; south aisle and bellchamber added in 1893...." see below) The church is built of flint rubble with stone dressings, partly rendered. Notable features include a 16th-century (Tudor period) wall painting of St Christopher carrying Jesus Christ. Local vicars have maintained a preaching that long-serving Archbishop Cranmer began experimenting with the first Book of Common Prayer at this church. A south window contains stained glass depicting the presentation of the first English Prayer Book to King Edward VI by Archbishop Cranmer. In the 14th century the east window was installed, and it has now been renewed in the same pattern by artist J. O. Scott. All Saints' has a nave including a baptistry to the west, south porch and aisle with chancel to east, and vestry addition to the north; on the north side are lancet windows, with one two-light perpendicular window in the north and south walls. Its gabled wooden porch has cusped bargeboards; the original stone door surround of the south door was rebuilt from pieces in a later restoration.

In 1907 a second church was constructed in front of Memorial Park and at the foot of the road to Chelsham, dedicated to St Christopher.

=== Post Industrial Revolution ===
In 1841 Warlingham had 512 inhabitants; a notable resident of the Victorian period was Sir Joseph Swan, inventor of the incandescent light bulb. Sir George Gilbert Scott led the project to renovate and restore All Saints' Church in 1857. Its south aisle was added in 1893. All Saints' plain-tiled roof with tile-hung bellchamber above, under a gilt and iron weathervane, was also added in 1893.

Five Coal-tax posts are listed for historic importance in Warlingham parish and there are six architecturally listed buildings: Court Cottage, The Vicarage, 23-31 Leas Road, the Church of All Saints, The White Lion (public house) and The Barn, sited by the vicarage. Also the World War I War Memorial has made the national heritage list. Both the vicarage and the church are listed at the higher grade of Grade II* whereas the rest are at Grade II.

Warlingham gave its name to the large psychiatric hospital that was opened on the borders of Warlingham and Chelsham in 1903. Originally called the "Croydon Mental Hospital" the institution was renamed "Warlingham Park Hospital" in the 1930s. The buildings, apart from the water tower, were demolished and the site redeveloped as a private housing estate called "Greatpark" in the early years of the 21st century.

During the Second World War, Warlingham was witness to the Battle of Britain, much of which was fought in the skies above this part of Surrey. The former RAF bases of Biggin Hill and Kenley were within a few miles of Warlingham in either direction, and from there fighters would intercept German bombers navigating their way up to London along the valley between Warlingham and Woldingham (then known as 'Bombers' Alley'). Warlingham War Memorial is the most prominent feature breaking up a lightly wooded, shop-surrounded green in the village. It is a simple yet poignant monument dedicated to the great many local people who made sacrifices during the two world wars in the 20th Century.

Lead singer of The Clash, Joe Strummer moved to Warlingham after his diplomat father and family returned to the UK.

Reggae singer and instrumentalist Smiley Culture lived in Warlingham. His death, as a result of a self-inflicted stabbing, occurred at his home in 2011 during a police arrest.

== Geography ==
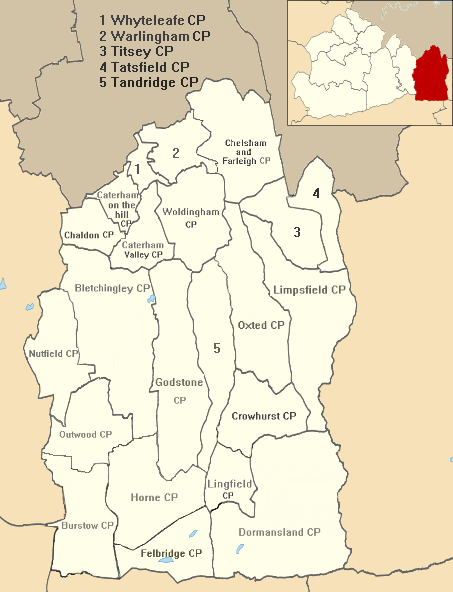
Map showing the position of Warlingham in Tandridge

Warlingham is situated on the scarp slope of the North Downs and parts of the village are 650 feet (200 metres) above sea level. This means that on the rare occasion it does snow in southern England, Warlingham will often get a light covering while neighbouring low-lying areas remain untouched. Warlingham's height also allows for some panoramic views over central London (on the stretch of the Limpsfield road between Warlingham village and Botley Hill Farm). On a clear day all the major skyscrapers (including Canary Wharf, the Gherkin and the NatWest tower) can be seen, and the hills north of London can be made out on the horizon.

Warlingham is in the Green Belt. Surrounding the town are the slopes of the North Downs, with rolling chalk meadow hillsides interspersed with woodlands. Parts of the adjacent Woldingham valley to the south have been designated a Site of Special Scientific Interest.

Blanchman's Farm Nature Reserve was set up in 1991 and was the first community wildlife area in Tandridge. It covers 10 hectares (25 acres) and includes a restored pond, around 10,000 native trees, and a path for wheelchair access.

=== Elevations ===
Elevations vary from 110m AOD at Woldingham Road, at the southernmost point of the parish, with a gentle increase in height through the village along the main road heading to the southeast, to the highest elevation (199.6m) at Limpsfield Road.

== Economy ==
Today, most of Warlingham's working-age population works in Croydon or central London, making Warlingham part of the London commuter belt.

== Local government ==
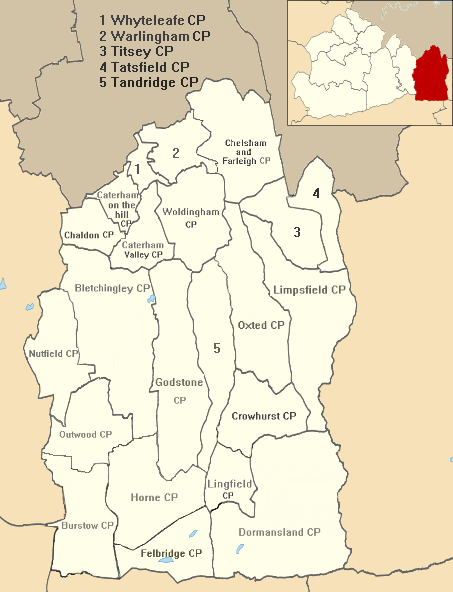
Civil Parishes in Tandridge District

Surrey County Council, headquartered in Reigate, elects one councillor for the Warlingham division every four years. Conservative Becky Rush was elected in a by-election in 2019.

Election	Member	Ward
2019	Becky Rush	Warlingham

Warlingham has five representatives across two wards on Tandridge District Council, headquartered in Oxted:

Election	Member	Ward
2002	Simon Morrow	Warlingham East, Chelsham & Farleigh
2012	Jeremy Pursehouse	Warlingham East, Chelsham & Farleigh
2019	Celia Caulcott	Warlingham East, Chelsham & Farleigh
2021	Keith Prew	Warlingham West
2018	Robin Bloore	Warlingham West

Warlingham has a civil parish council comprising two wards. Warlingham East ward elects six councillors, with Warlingham West ward electing five every four years. The parish council clerk is Gina Caunt.

== Amenities ==
Warlingham is centred on a triangular, tree-lined village green that contains a war memorial. Shops nearby include supermarkets, a pharmacy, a hardware store, a newsagent, two hair salons, two local firms of estate agents and a local solicitors. Also situated on the green are a village hall, a few small rustic cottages, a gift shop, and several dress shops and restaurants. To the south of The Green is School Common, an open recreational area with a notable wildlife pond known as Willeypit or Willey's Pit pond, and some Alms Houses.

A short walk from the green is the community library, which is open most days of the week, and also provides laminating, photocopying, printing and scanning services.

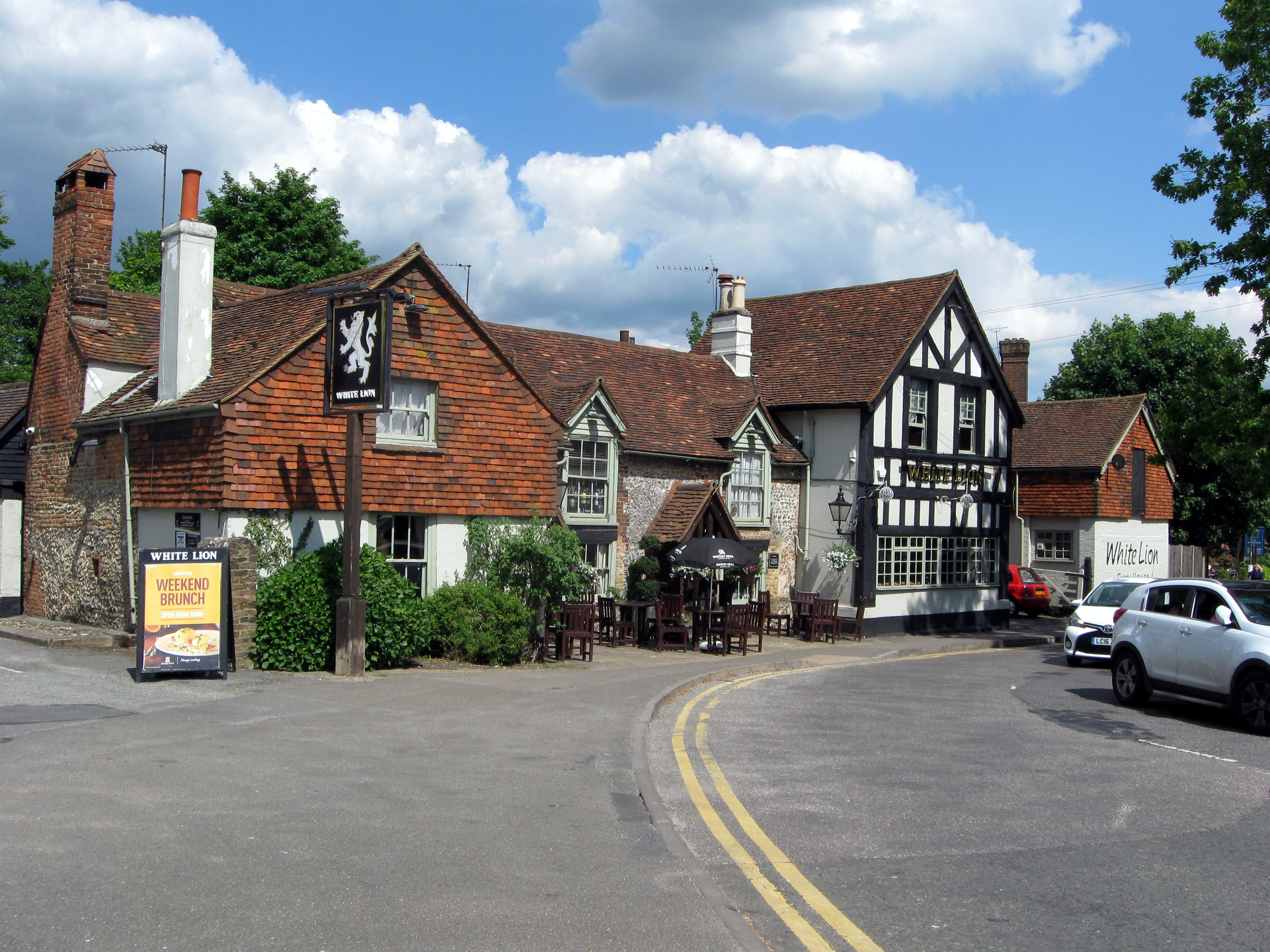
The White Lion, Warlingham in May 2019

Warlingham formerly had a total of four pubs of varying character and locations (including the old coaching Inn, the 'White Lion'). This unusual concentration of pubs in Warlingham was due to the neighbouring villages of Sanderstead, Woldingham and Farleigh not having any pubs of their own. In recent years the Leather Bottle has been converted to a Spanish restaurant and Tapas bar and as of 2022 has changed again to a Turkish restaurant and takeaway. The Hare & Hounds has become a spaghetti restaurant, leaving the aforementioned White Lion and The Horseshoe.

Warlingham has a large Sainsbury's supermarket, built on the site of the former London Transport bus garage known as Chelsham (garage code: CM).

== Local schools ==
- Warlingham School is closer to Hamsey Green than Warlingham (and is on the same campus as Hamsey Green Junior and Infant schools) and is a senior state school, with a multi-course Sixth Form.
- Warlingham Park School is a small private school which is very close to Chelsham Common (and is near the Great Park housing estate).
- Warlingham Village Primary School is on Farleigh Road – which historically was "Farleigh School".
- Private schools include Caterham, Woldingham School for Girls, Croydon High, Whitgift and Trinity.

== Local transport ==
Warlingham is served by two railway stations on adjacent but separate lines (a legacy of the Victorian railway boom, and the competition between two private companies to service this part of Surrey).

Upper Warlingham railway station is about a mile from Warlingham and has fast Southern services to London Victoria and London Bridge as well as East Grinstead and Uckfield. The "Upper" prefix occurs because of a former station on the Caterham line which was named Warlingham until 11 June 1956 despite being even further away from the village. This station was renamed Whyteleafe South from that date.

Just a few minutes' walk from Upper Warlingham is Whyteleafe railway station, which has slightly slower trains to London and Caterham departing every quarter of an hour.

The village is served by London Buses route 403 and Metrobus routes 409 and 411. These buses provide connections to Croydon, Selsdon, Caterham, Redhill, Reigate, Godstone, Lingfield and East Grinstead.

== Sport ==
Warlingham has a Non-League football club Warlingham F.C. Warlingham Sports Club dates back to 1856 and incorporates Warlingham Squash and Racketball Club, Warlingham Cricket Club, and Warlingham Tennis Club, all of which are very active.

Warlingham is also home to Warlingham Rugby Football Club, which was founded in 1922.

== Demography and housing ==
2011 Census Homes
Output area	Detached	Semi-detached	Terraced	Flats and apartments	Caravans/temporary/mobile homes	shared between households
(Civil Parish)	1,154	1,182	283	708	38	0

The average level of accommodation in the region composed of detached houses was 28%, the average that was apartments was 22.6%.

2011 Census Key Statistics
Output area	Population	Households	% Owned outright	% Owned with a loan	hectares
(Civil Parish)	8,036	3,365	43.6%	38.5%	602

The proportion of households in the civil parish who own their home outright compares to the regional average of 35.1%. The proportion who own their home with a loan compares to the regional average of 32.5%. The remaining % is made up of rented dwellings (plus a negligible % of households living rent-free).

== See also ==
- List of places of worship in Tandridge (district)
- Warlingham Park Hospital (1903–1999), former residential asylum/hospital, now converted apartments in Farleigh.

== Notes and references ==
Notes
