= List of places of worship in Tandridge District =

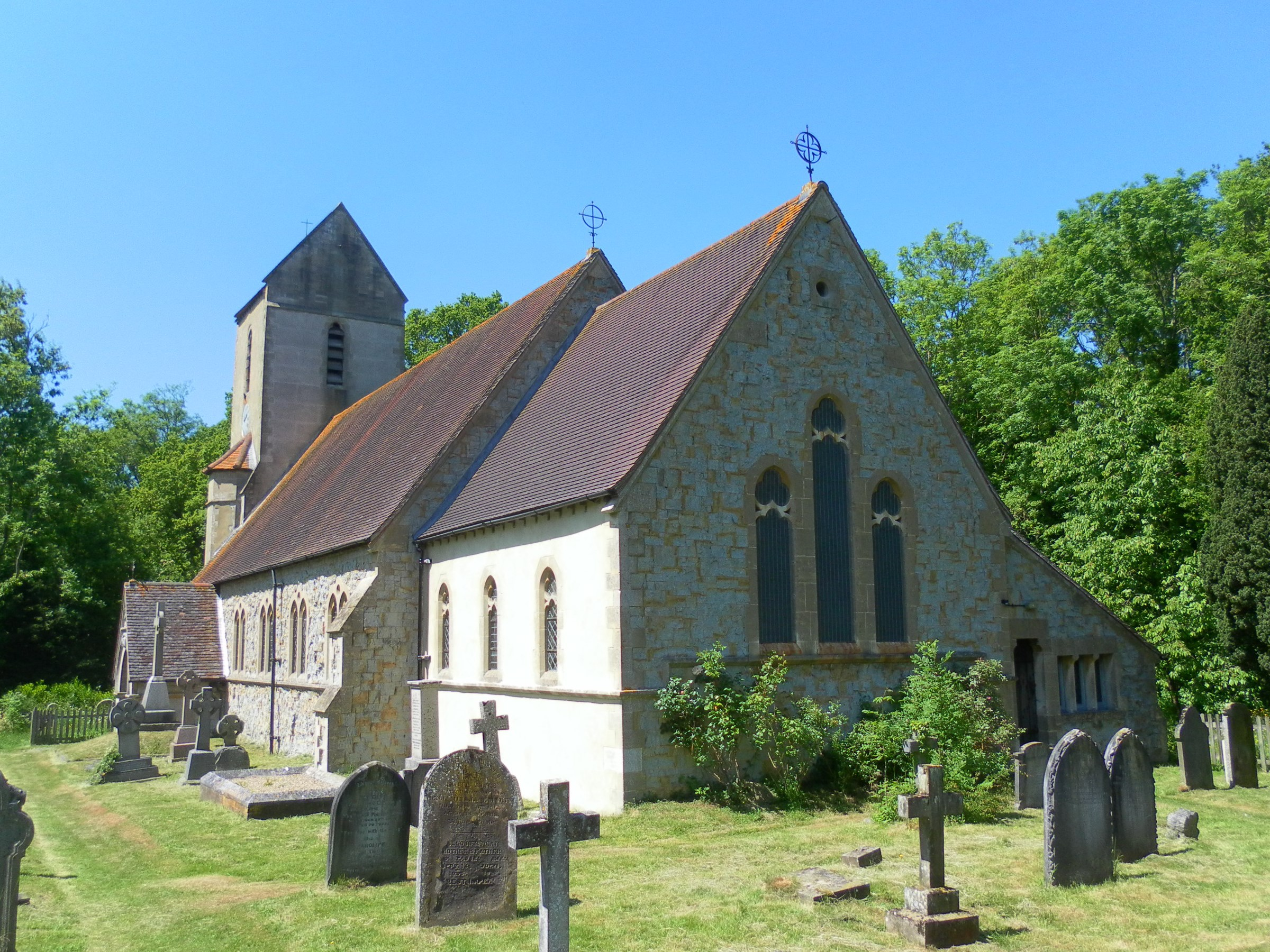
St John the Baptist's Church at Outwood (1869, by William Burges) is one of many rural parish churches in the district.

The district of Tandridge, the easternmost of 11 local government districts in the English county of Surrey, has more than 70 current and former places of worship. Religious buildings dating from every age between the Norman era and the present are found across the area, which is characterised by small towns and ancient hamlets. A range of architectural styles and materials are represented: from "Surrey's only Perpendicular Gothic church of any size or pretension" (at Lingfield) to small weatherboarded buildings, tin tabernacles and modern brick chapels. As of 2022, 61 places of worship are in use in the district and a further 13 former churches and chapels no longer hold religious services but survive in alternative uses.

Christianity is the majority religion in Tandridge, and the Church of England — the country's Established Church — is represented by the largest number of churches. Several congregations of Roman Catholics, Methodists, Baptists and the United Reformed Church also meet at their own buildings in the main towns and elsewhere; and various other Protestant Nonconformist denominations are accommodated in chapels and meeting rooms of different styles and ages. Jehovah's Witnesses and the Church of Jesus Christ of Latter-day Saints both have large places of worship of regional importance in the district.

English Heritage has awarded listed status to 28 places of worship in the district of Tandridge. A building is defined as "listed" when it is placed on a statutory register of buildings of "special architectural or historic interest" in accordance with the Planning (Listed Buildings and Conservation Areas) Act 1990. The Department for Culture, Media and Sport, a Government department, is responsible for this; English Heritage, a non-departmental public body, acts as an agency of the department to administer the process and advise the department on relevant issues. There are three grades of listing status: Grade I, the highest, is defined as being of "exceptional interest"; Grade II* is used for "particularly important buildings of more than special interest"; and Grade II, the lowest, is used for buildings of "special interest". As of February 2001, there were 20 buildings with Grade I status, 52 with Grade II* status and 519 with Grade II status in the district.

== Overview of the district ==
Tandridge is in the east of Surrey.

Tandridge is the easternmost of the 11 districts in Surrey, an inland county in southeast England immediately south of London. It covers 50,440 acres (20,410 ha) and had a population of 82,998 at the time of the United Kingdom Census 2011. Clockwise from the north, it shares borders with the London boroughs of Croydon and Bromley, the district of Sevenoaks in Kent, the Wealden district in East Sussex, the Mid Sussex district and the borough of Crawley of West Sussex, and the Surrey district of Reigate and Banstead.

The district is largely rural. Caterham is the largest town with 31,000 people, Oxted (which is part of a larger urban area with neighbouring Hurst Green and Limpsfield) has 11,000, and more than half the population lives in the suburbanised northern part of the district which includes these towns and nearby Warlingham, Whyteleafe and Woldingham. This area is adjacent to the London Borough of Croydon and is part of the Greater London Urban Area. Elsewhere, there are many small villages with ancient origins—many have their own parish church, sometimes supplemented with other places of worship.

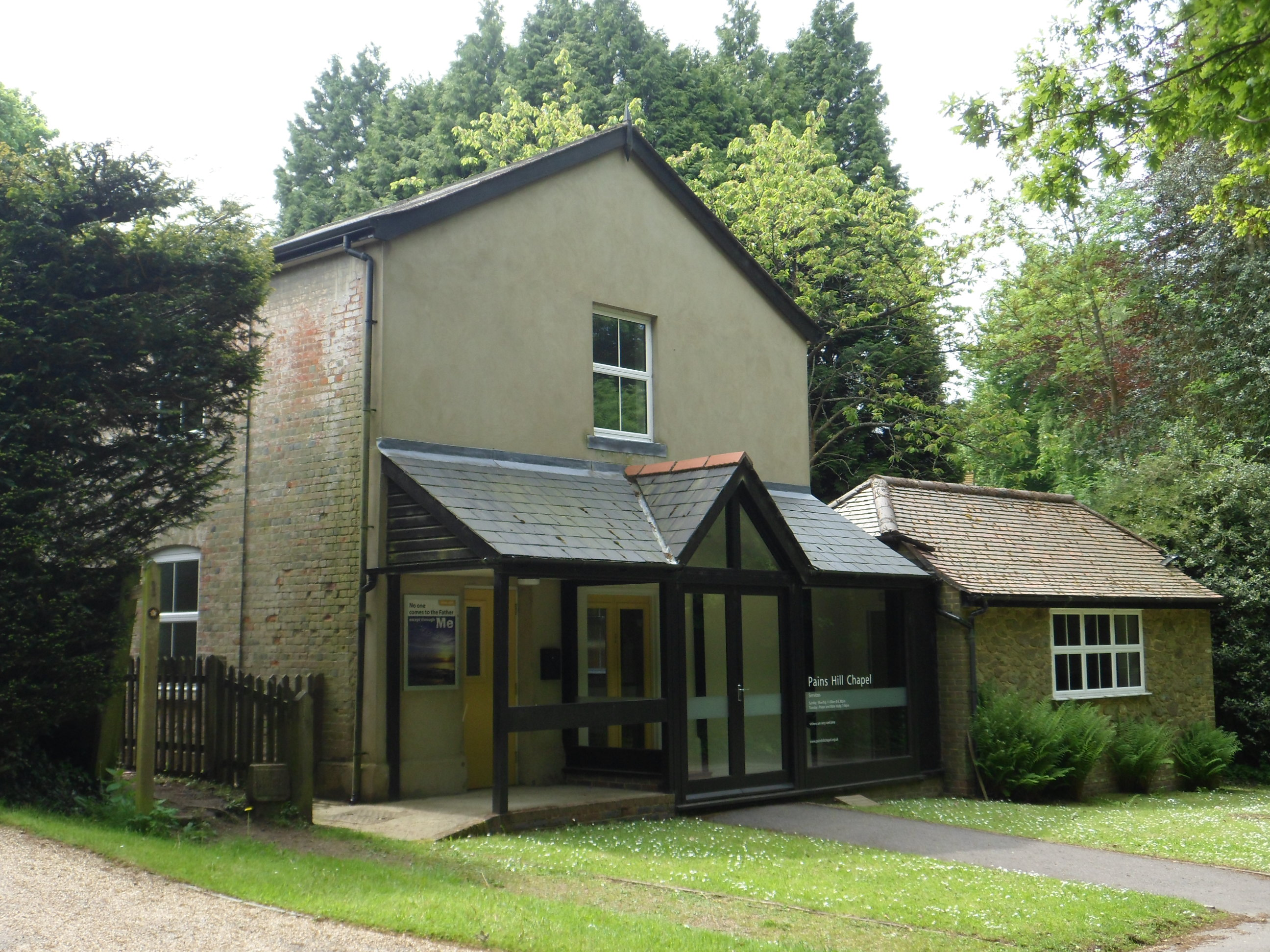
Pains Hill Chapel has served a wide rural area since the early 19th century.

Anglican churches with 12th-century or older origins include those at Bletchingley, Burstow, Chelsham, Horne and Nutfield; many have been rebuilt and restored to some extent, but the survival of ancient fabric is common. Caterham's church of St Lawrence, dating from about 1100 and featuring a "truly remarkable" original window, has been supplemented by two 19th-century churches but remains open for services. Other Anglican churches were built in the Victorian era and the 20th century as villages and suburbs expanded: examples include St Luke's at Whyteleafe, the second church (St Christopher's) at Warlingham, and the centrally located and much larger St Paul's at Woldingham (1933)—superseding the isolated single-room St Agatha's Church, called "Surrey's meanest chapel" by Pevsner. Elsewhere, a former school was converted into a church in South Godstone, and at Smallfield a church hall doubles as an Anglican chapel of ease.

Protestant Nonconformity has a long history in the district. Baptist worship has taken place at Dormansland since 1792, and the church (which occupies a building dating from 1817) helped to found several others in the area—such as those at Lingfield and Smallfield (both now closed). The isolated Pains Hill Chapel near Limpsfield has existed since 1823, and since World War II Evangelical congregations have developed in Hurst Green and Smallfield. Meanwhile, the village of Newchapel was chosen as the site of England's first Latter-day Saints' Temple, named the London England Temple. The main towns have places of worship serving a wider variety of denominations: the Congregational Federation can be found in Caterham, Oxted has an Open Brethren Gospel Hall, and a Christian Science church, and both places support Roman Catholic and United Reformed congregations. Oxted's Catholic and United Reformed churches are both Grade II-listed: the former, a "quite exceptional building" of the early 20th century, combines the Perpendicular Gothic Revival and Arts and Crafts styles, while the Church of the Peace of God (the United Reformed church) is a 1930s interpretation of the Byzantine style. The Methodist Statistical Returns published in 1947 (Note: The statistical return was compiled between 1940 and 1947 with the aim of documenting all Methodist chapels extant at that time: their location, previous affiliation prior to the Methodist Union of 1932, capacity, building materials and similar details.) recorded chapels of Wesleyan Methodist origin in Bletchingley, Caterham (the "Guards' Church", used by the public and by soldiers at the nearby barracks), Caterham Valley, Lingfield and Warlingham. Caterham's chapel, registered in 1904, is still in use; Warlingham's was replaced by a new building on the same site in 1961; Lingfield's is now in secular use; and the other two do not survive. A new Methodist church building was also registered in 1961 in Hurst Green, although this closed in 2021. Elsewhere, the Plymouth Brethren Christian Church have a meeting room in the former goods yard next to Upper Warlingham railway station in Whyteleafe and another on the borders of Whyteleafe and Caterham.

== Religious affiliation ==
According to the United Kingdom Census 2011, 82,998 people lived in the district of Tandridge. Of these, 64.87% identified themselves as Christian, 0.74% were Hindu, 0.72% were Muslim, 0.36% were Buddhist, 0.16% were Jewish, 0.07% were Sikh, 0.32% followed another religion, 25.27% claimed no religious affiliation and 7.5% did not state their religion. The proportion of Christians was much higher than the 59.38% in England as a whole. Adherents of Islam, Hinduism, Judaism and Sikhism and Buddhism were much less prevalent in the district than in England overall: in 2011, 5.02% of people in England were Muslim, 1.52% were Hindu, 0.79% were Sikh, 0.49% were Jewish and 0.45% were Buddhist. The proportion of people who followed religions not mentioned in the Census was also lower than the national figure of 0.43%. The proportion of people with no religious affiliation was slightly higher than the 24.74% recorded at a national level.

== Administration ==
=== Anglican churches ===
All of Tandridge district's Anglican churches are administered by the Anglican Diocese of Southwark, the seat of which is Southwark Cathedral in London. There are three episcopal areas within the diocese, each of which has two archdeaconries; in turn these each cover a number of deaneries. Caterham Deanery and Godstone Deanery, both of which are in the Reigate Archdeaconry and the Croydon Episcopal Area, cover all the district's churches. The three churches at Caterham, two each at Warlingham and Woldingham, and those at Chaldon, Chelsham, Farleigh and Whyteleafe, are administered by Caterham Deanery. Godstone Deanery includes the churches at Bletchingley, Blindley Heath, Burstow, Crowhurst, Dormansland, Felbridge, Godstone, Horne, Hurst Green, Limpsfield, Limpsfield Chart, Lingfield, Nutfield, Outwood, Oxted, South Godstone, South Nutfield, Tandridge and Tatsfield. The church hall at Smallfield in the parish of Burstow is also used for services and is accordingly part of the Deanery.

=== Roman Catholic churches ===
There are Roman Catholic churches at Caterham, Lingfield, Oxted and Warlingham. They are administered by the Roman Catholic Diocese of Arundel and Brighton, whose cathedral is at Arundel in West Sussex. Caterham, Oxted and Warlingham are part of the Redhill Deanery, one of 13 deaneries in the diocese, while Lingfield is in Crawley Deanery as it is part of a joint parish with East Grinstead in West Sussex. The former church at Whyteleafe was also part of Redhill Deanery. Occasional Catholic Masses were held for many years at the Anglican church in Tatsfield, which was covered by the parish of Oxted and Warlingham, but these had ceased by 2019.

=== Other denominations ===
Dormansland Baptist Church is within the Tonbridge Network of the South Eastern Baptist Association, and Godstone Baptist Church is part of that organisation's Gatwick Network. The two Methodist churches in the district, at Caterham and Warlingham, are part of the seven-church Purley Methodist Circuit. The former Hurst Green Methodist Church was also in this circuit until its closure. The Southern Synod, one of 13 synods of the United Reformed Church in the United Kingdom, administers the United Reformed churches at Caterham and Oxted. Smallfield Evangelical Church is a member of the Fellowship of Independent Evangelical Churches (FIEC), a pastoral and administrative network of about 500 churches with an evangelical outlook, and of Affinity (formerly the British Evangelical Council), a network of conservative Evangelical congregations throughout Great Britain. Caterham Community Church, Dormansland Baptist Church, Godstone Baptist Church, King's Church at Oxted, Oakhall Church and Whyteleafe United Free Church maintain links with the Evangelical Alliance. Caterham Community Church is also part of the Congregational Federation, an association of independent Congregational churches in Great Britain. The federation came into existence in 1972 when the Congregational Church in England and Wales merged with several other denominations to form the United Reformed Church. Certain congregations wanted to remain independent of this, and instead joined the Congregational Federation. As of January 2021 there were 235 churches in the Federation. Oakhall Church, also in Caterham, is one of 11 churches in the South East region of Partnership UK, a charitable incorporated organisation which acts as a support network for independent and self-governing churches.

== Current places of worship ==
Current places of worship
Name	Image	Location	Denomination/ Affiliation	Grade	Notes	Refs
St Mary the Virgin's Church (More images)		Bletchingley; 51.2414°N 0.0995°W	Anglican	I	This church is set back from the village street in a large churchyard. Its Norman tower was added to in the 17th century and 1910. The nave is c. 1180 and much 13th-century and older work remains in the chancel, but an aisle was added in 1856 and J.L. Pearson undertook restoration in 1870.	
St Mark's Chapel		Bletchingley; 51.2231°N 0.0799°W	Anglican	II	Situated on the South Park estate and originally a 17th-century barn, this private chapel is sometimes used for public services. It was converted in 1909 but was burnt down and rebuilt three years later. Red and brown brick and tiles are the main materials, and the side walls are buttressed. A decorative cupola with a clockface, a dome and a weathervane sits on the gable end.	
St John the Evangelist's Church (More images)		Blindley Heath; 51.1962°N 0.0536°W	Anglican	II	The Early English Gothic Revival church is mostly the work of the Whichcord & Walker firm; their 1842 design was added to in 1886 by Gordon Macdonald Hills, who built the apse and an additional aisle. There is stained glass by Morris & Co. Rubble and ashlar walls with diagonal buttresses lead to a west tower with a thin spire.	
St Bartholomew's Church (More images)		Burstow; 51.1559°N 0.1248°W	Anglican	I	The Archbishop of Canterbury owned land in the parish and may have built the first church. There are 12th-century windows and some other Norman features, but 15th-century Perpendicular Gothic work is more prevalent—and the "subtle and deft" 16th-century tower, entirely weatherboarded and with a shingled spire, is the dominant feature of the west end. Astronomer Royal John Flamsteed was rector here, and the east window is a memorial to him.	
St Lawrence's Church (More images)		Caterham; 51.2821°N 0.0860°W	Anglican	I	The ancient village church fell out of use in 1866 when St Mary's was built opposite, but reopened in 1927 and is back in regular use. The Norman-era apse has gone, but much 12th- and 13th-century work remains and the walls retain their original rubble and clunch. Some windows have their original y-tracery.	
St John the Evangelist's Church (More images)		Caterham; 51.2821°N 0.0853°W	Anglican	II	A church was provided for the rapidly growing Caterham Valley area around the railway station in 1881–82. William Bassett Smith's large church was later extended on the north side by Thomas Graham Jackson. The east window, by an unknown designer, has Art Nouveau influences. Bargate stone is the main material, and the style is Decorated Gothic Revival.	
St Mary the Virgin's Church (More images)		Caterham; 51.2811°N 0.0763°W	Anglican	II	William and C.A. Bassett Smith's new parish church for Caterham, built in 1866–68 of flint and stone in the Early English Gothic Revival style, was criticised as "routine Middle-Pointed at its worst" by Nikolaus Pevsner. The three-stage tower, with a tall broach spire, stands closest to the road; behind this is a twin-aisled nave and a chancel with two side chapels. The internal fittings are mostly 20th-century.	
Caterham Baptist Chapel (More images)		Caterham; 51.2879°N 0.0769°W	Baptist	–	Ebenezer Chapel opened on 9 September 1895, although Strict Baptist meetings in Caterham Valley started 18 months earlier. Pastors from the church in Croydon gave much assistance in the early 20th century. The old building, which cost £236 at the time, was deregistered in March 1978 and replaced by the present chapel. This was registered under its present name in May 1978. In the postwar period the church moved towards the theology of General Baptists, having previously identified as a Strict and Particular Baptist congregation aligned to the Gospel Standard movement.	
Caterham Community Church (More images)		Caterham; 51.2878°N 0.0981°W	Congregational Federation	–	Linked to the main Congregational (now United Reformed) church in Caterham Valley, this was founded in 1876 as Caterham Hill Congregational Church and rebuilt in 1892. It still retained this name when registered for worship in August 1942 and for marriages two months later, but has since adopted a new name. There are weekly services. The building is in the Caterham on the Hill area of the town.	
Caterham Christian Centre (More images)		Caterham; 51.2850°N 0.0788°W	Evangelical	–	The present Evangelical fellowship was founded in the 1990s, but an Open Brethren place of worship existed on the site in Croydon Road from 1888. It was registered with the name Bethany Hall in June 1897. A timber and iron structure served the congregation until the effects of time, weathering and bomb damage made it unusable by the 1960s. The church was rebuilt in brick, and more work took place in the 1970s and 1980s.	
Caterham Methodist Church (More images)		Caterham; 51.2890°N 0.0989°W	Methodist	–	The chapel was originally provided for Nonconformist soldiers at the neighbouring barracks (and was registered in July 1904 as Caterham School Chapel and Soldiers' Rooms), but it later opened for public Methodist worship. The interior was refitted in the 1990s, and the building is now used for social and community events and a Sunday school as well as for worship.	
Oakhall Church		Caterham; 51.2834°N 0.0982°W	Non-denominational	–	The original Oakhall Church was established in Upper Caterham in 1894. A small building on Francis Road was used until 2019, when the congregation moved to a much larger building in another part of Caterham. The opening services and an initial dedication ceremony took place in early February 2019, the church was formally registered the following month, and a further dedication ceremony was held in June.	
Church of the Sacred Heart (More images)		Caterham; 51.2874°N 0.0864°W	Roman Catholic	II	This church and an associated school both opened in 1881. Edward Ingress Bell adopted a cruciform layout for the Bargate stone-built Early English Gothic Revival church, but his intended corner tower and spire were never built. The nave was lengthened in 1930, forming a porch which was extended again in around 2000. The "impressive" interior was designed as a unified composition and included much Hardman & Co. stained glass.	
Caterham United Reformed Church (More images)		Caterham; 51.2803°N 0.0798°W	United Reformed Church	–	There was no Nonconformist church in the Caterham area until the Soper family founded one in 1863. Temporary premises were replaced by a chapel from 1865, and the present large building (with a prominent clock tower) was built for £6,000 to the design of John Sulman and opened on 6 April 1875. Lecture rooms and a school were subsequently built as well.	
St Peter and St Paul's Church (More images)		Chaldon; 51.2854°N 0.1247°W	Anglican	I	One window survives from the 11th century, but the present appearance of this small church is largely late-12th-century. Flint, chalk and local firestone are the main materials in the short, wide and tall building. The Decorated Gothic east window has stained glass of 1869 by James Powell and Sons. A c. 1200 mural representing the Purgatorial Ladder has been called "the most interesting ancient wall-painting in England".	
St Leonard's Church (More images)		Chelsham; 51.3142°N 0.0089°W	Anglican	II	Victorian restoration (by an architect called Spencer in 1870–71) made the 13th-century exterior "almost unrecognisable", but some even older work survives—such as some herringbone brickwork and a 12th-century shaft and capital inside, possibly from a now vanished arcade (the church has no aisles). The tower is 15th-century.	
St George's Church (More images)		Crowhurst; 51.2094°N 0.0106°W	Anglican	II	The walls of this mostly 12th-century church are of local stone with some brickwork, and a tall broach spire rises from a weatherboarded turret at one end of the nave. The windows are various Early English and Decorated Gothic, some incorporating older material. Minimal restoration work has been undertaken (although some was needed after a fire in 1947), and the Victoria County History of Surrey calls it "one of the most interesting churches in the district".	
St John the Evangelist's Church (More images)		Dormansland; 51.1597°N 0.0053°E	Anglican	–	Condemned as "bad" by Nikolaus Pevsner, this Decorated Gothic Revival-style church was designed in 1883 by Arthur Blomfield and became parished two years later. Previously it was in the parish of Lingfield. The stone building has a bellcote at one end.	
Dormansland Baptist Church (More images)		Dormansland; 51.1634°N 0.0075°E	Baptist	–	A chapel of 1786 was replaced in 1817 by the present two-storey building, a "completely plain ... brick box" with gable ends and a string-course dividing the two floors—a characteristic feature of 17th-century Nonconformist architecture. There are three segmental-arched windows on the symmetrical façade and a datestone in the gable. The interior is galleried on three sides.	
Claridge House (More images)		Dormansland; 51.1669°N 0.0055°E	Quaker	–	Although Claridge House is primarily a Quaker healing centre and spiritual retreat, public meetings for worship take place every Sunday as part of the West Weald Area Meeting, a group of eight Friends Meeting Houses in the Surrey and West Sussex area.	
St Mary's Church (More images)		Farleigh; 51.3233°N 0.0318°W	Anglican	I	This tiny building, a "surprising survival" in a remote village just outside the urban sprawl of the London Borough of Croydon (and briefly included within it in the 1960s until residents demanded to be moved back into Surrey), dates solely from two periods: c. 1100 and c. 1250. Of the earlier date are the nave and the original section of the chancel; in the mid-13th century 10 feet (3.0 m) was added to the chancel and new windows were inserted. The walls are of flint, long since plastered over and painted, and with some Caen stonework. A church probably existed on the site from the start of the 11th century	
St John the Divine's Church (More images)		Felbridge; 51.1415°N 0.0393°W	Anglican	–	Felbridge was originally in the parish of Godstone, although it is 8 miles (13 km) south of there on the Sussex border. A chapel existed in the medieval period, but the present local stone building by William White dates from 1865. A parish was created from territory in Godstone, Tandridge and East Grinstead parishes. The Decorated Gothic Revival exterior gives way to a "well proportioned [and] well detailed" interior.	
St Nicholas' Church (More images)		Godstone; 51.2464°N 0.0573°W	Anglican	I	Greatly extended in 1845 and 1872 with the addition of north and south aisles respectively, the church has 12th-century origins (visible in fragmentary form in the nave) but dates mostly from the 13th and 14th centuries. George Gilbert Scott lived in the parish and carried out the "great and fanciful" works of 1872, which included extending the spire among other things. Ward and Hughes designed the stained glass in the east window in 1865.	
St Mary's Chapel (More images)		Godstone; 51.2466°N 0.0568°W	Anglican	II*	George Gilbert Scott also worked on the "very picturesque" group of almshouses next to the church: they date from 1872. The composition includes a chapel which although nominally private, is also open to the public for Anglican services monthly on a Wednesday. The chapel is topped with a flèche and has a "domestic-style" interior with timber framing and details not normally associated with Scott's work.	
Godstone Baptist Church (More images)		Godstone; 51.2538°N 0.0671°W	Baptist	–	A Baptist chapel has existed in Godstone since 1882, but the present building (in the Tyler's Green area of the village) was registered for marriages in July 1940. The original building was a 250-capacity tin tabernacle with an attached schoolroom. The first service was held on 15 February 1882.	
St Mary the Virgin's Church (More images)		Horne; 51.1827°N 0.0887°W	Anglican	II*	Horne's 14th-century church has only had its own parish since 1705; previously it was administered from Bletchingley. Nothing of how the church looked in that era remains, because Gordon Macdonald Hills undertook a restoration in 1880 variously described as "drastic" and "pitiful", in which he "shuffled the fragments like a pack of cards". Such features include some 14th- and 15th-century windows and the entrance on the south side, all reset from other parts of the church. There is a timber bellcot topped with a small spire.	
St John the Evangelist's Church (More images)		Hurst Green; 51.2456°N 0.0001°W	Anglican	–	In 1912 it was recorded that "a site has been given and money is being collected" for a bigger church to replace St Agatha's Mission Hall, which previously served the village. The new church was completed that year to the design of John Oldrid Scott; it was condemned by Nikolaus Pevsner as "an inept bit of flint Decorated [Gothic Revival]". H.G. Nisbet extended it in 1962, and a fire caused severe damage in 1988.	
Hurst Green Evangelical Free Church (More images)		Hurst Green; 51.2446°N 0.0051°E	Evangelical	–	This church replaced an earlier mission hall on the same site when it was registered for worship and for marriages in May 1955.	
St Peter's Church (More images)		Limpsfield; 51.2610°N 0.0123°E	Anglican	I	The plain, substantial tower dates from the 1180s, and some herringbone brickwork in the west wall is contemporary. The rest of the "good, dour Wealden building" is 13th-century, although parts were added and rearranged in the Victorian era and the entrance porch is 16th-century. Clayton and Bell provided stained glass in 1871. The church sits high above the road in a large churchyard.	
St Andrew's Church (More images)		Limpsfield Chart; 51.2476°N 0.0429°E	Anglican	–	Also known as St Andrew's-on-the-Chart, this rubble-walled church was founded in 1895 and completed in 1902 with the addition of a spire-topped tower. Reginald Blomfield was the designer; he adopted a loosely Gothic Revival style. Inside, the reredos has Arts and Crafts overtones. A church hall was built alongside in 1959.	
Pains Hill Chapel (More images)		Limpsfield Chart; 51.2499°N 0.0237°E	Evangelical	–	With help from the Surrey Congregational Mission and a church at Oxted, a congregation was formed in this isolated hamlet and a chapel was built for £5 in 1823. The first service in the 150-capacity building was on 6 August of that year. By 1860 the church adopted a Baptist character, and in 1966 it became an independent Evangelical church whose trusteeship was vested in the FIEC. It was registered for marriages in August 1926.	
St Peter and St Paul's Church (More images)		Lingfield; 51.1764°N 0.0145°W	Anglican	I	This became a collegiate church when Reginald de Cobham, 2nd Baron Cobham founded St Peter's College (now vanished) here in 1431 and endowed the church accordingly. Only the 14th-century tower, a "peculiar structure" which is disproportionately tall, remains from before his Perpendicular Gothic-style rebuilding, which gave the church a "double nave" effect. The church is built of sandstone throughout, and the roof is tiled with Horsham Stone.	
St Bernard's Church (More images)		Lingfield; 51.1755°N 0.0183°W	Roman Catholic	–	Mass is held every Sunday morning at this church, which is part of the parish of East Grinstead with Lingfield. It was registered for worship in March 1945 and for marriages the following April.	
London England Temple (More images)		Newchapel; 51.1626°N 0.0522°W	Latter-day Saint	–	Before the temple was built, some rooms at the nearby Newchapel House ("an elaborate fake half-timbered house" of 1908 designed by Charles Bowles) were registered for worship between February 1954 and February 1959. Next to this house, the Latter-day Saints' first temple outside the United States was built in 1958. Edward O. Anderson of Salt Lake City was responsible for the design (an "odd stripped Classical" style, old-fashioned for the date), but T.P. Bennett and Son undertook the work. There is a large multi-floored hall with a tall spire-topped tower at one end.	
St Peter and St Paul's Church (More images)		Nutfield; 51.2420°N 0.1258°W	Anglican	II*	The church is in a large churchyard north of and below the village, and retains some 13th-century features-for example the arcade to the north aisle, the chancel arch and some of the windows. Otherwise the present appearance derives from W.O. Milne's restoration and extension of 1882 (he added an aisle on the south side). The stained glass in the east window, with "deep sultry blues", is by Edward Burne-Jones (1890), and he designed another window in the south aisle.	
St John the Baptist's Church (More images)		Outwood; 51.1982°N 0.1128°W	Anglican	II	William Burges, who also designed the church at nearby Lowfield Heath, was responsible for this smaller and more modest chapel in 1869. It lacked a tower until 1876, when W.P. Manning added the "impressive ... big stuccoed saddleback" structure.	
St Mary's Church (More images)		Oxted; 51.2591°N 0.0087°W	Anglican	I	The church developed slowly between the 12th and 15th centuries: the Bargate stone tower is the oldest remaining structure, the chancel is 13th-century, next came the nave and aisles, and the porch was added in the 15th century. Extensive Victorian restoration gave the building its present appearance. There is some "richly coloured" stained glass by Edward Burne-Jones.	
First Church of Christ, Scientist, Oxted (More images)		Oxted; 51.2543°N 0.0124°W	Christian Scientist	–	This branch of the Mother Church in Boston, Massachusetts serves Oxted and the surrounding area and was registered in November 1957. There is also a Christian Science Reading Room in the town.	
King's Church (More images)		Oxted; 51.2586°N 0.0017°W	Evangelical	–	This Evangelical church has its church centre and administrative office at this town-centre location. Worship also takes place at a school.	
Beadles Lane Gospel Hall (More images)		Oxted; 51.2518°N 0.0165°W	Open Brethren	–	A "neat little chapel" opened on 5 June 1811 in Oxted has been identified as being on Beadles Lane in the Old Oxted part of the town, although this may have been associated with the Surrey Congregational Mission. The present building on this lane is used by the Open Brethren.	
All Saints Church (More images)		Oxted; 51.2609°N 0.0043°W	Roman Catholic	II	Architect James Leonard Williams was mainly a house designer who worked in the Arts and Crafts style; his only other church was at Sudbury, London. All Saints was started in 1914 but remained incomplete until 1928, and a major extension was built in 2001. The exterior features a "sensitive blend of brick, stone and flint", and the high-quality fittings include a replica of Fra Angelico's Coronation of the Virgin. The church was registered for marriages in January 1916.	
Church of the Peace of God (More images)		Oxted; 51.2601°N 0.0034°W	United Reformed Church	II	A "large Congregational chapel" of 1905 on Bluehouse Lane, which superseded one opened on 12 July 1900, was in turn replaced by the present building on the same site in 1934–35. Frederick Lawrence was the designer of the cruciform Byzantine Revival brick and tile building, which has an apsidal chancel and a small tower with a cross added in 1959. The new church was registered in October 1935.	
Smallfield Church Hall (More images)		Smallfield; 51.1716°N 0.1162°W	Anglican	–	This combined church hall and chapel of ease to St Bartholomew's Church at Burstow stands on Redehall Road in Smallfield village centre. Although the Incorporated Church Building Society approved a grant of money towards a "mission church" in the parish in 1911, it was not recorded in the Victoria County History of Surrey published that year, and the 1913 Ordnance Survey map shows only a plot of land marked out for it.	
Smallfield Evangelical Church (More images)		Smallfield; 51.1729°N 0.1160°W	Evangelical	–	In the centre of Smallfield village was a long-established mission hall; it existed on the 1896–97 Ordnance Survey map and was described by that name in 1912. It was reregistered as an Evangelical church in April 1965.	
St Stephen's Church		South Godstone; 51.2197°N 0.0491°W	Anglican	–	This had its origins in a school chapel—a combined building serving both purposes. It was originally served from the main parish church at Godstone.	
Surrey Assembly Hall (More images)		South Godstone; 51.1874°N 0.0667°W	Jehovah's Witnesses	–	This major regional centre for the Jehovah's Witnesses denomination is based in the former Hays Bridge Reformatory School, originally built as Court Lees in 1938 to the design of J. Douglass Matthews & Partners architects. Its bulky Neo-Georgian form is "utterly incongruous" in its plain rural surroundings. It was registered in March 1988.	
Christ Church (More images)		South Nutfield; 51.2234°N 0.1364°W	Anglican	–	This part of the parish of Nutfield grew rapidly after a railway station was opened in 1883. Christ Church dates from 1888 and is a red-brick structure in the Early English Gothic Revival style. There is a tower with a spire, an aisleless nave and a lower chancel.	
St Silvan's Church		Staffhurst Wood; 51.2206°N 0.0170°E	Anglican	–	This small church was originally a mission room in the parish of Limpsfield; although constituted as a full church in 1930, it remains within Limpsfield parish. A mid-19th-century rector of the parish church paid for the building to be constructed in this isolated area. Part of the church was turned into a house in 1976.	
St Peter's Church (More images)		Tandridge; 51.2431°N 0.0320°W	Anglican	I	The 12th- and 14th-century nave was aisleless until 1844, when one was built on the south side; another was added to the north in 1874 by George Gilbert Scott when he was living at nearby Godstone. To Nikolaus Pevsner, "the interest of the church is in its timberwork", including the cross bracing supporting the small shingled spire.	
St Mary's Church (More images)		Tatsfield; 51.2868°N 0.0310°E	Anglican	II	The dedication of this isolated hilltop church was said to be unknown in 1911. The ancient and unusually tall walls combine flint, chalk, local yellow sandstone and plaster. Norman work remains in the aisleless nave, which has been dated to c. 1075; the chancel was remodelled in the 1220s. In 1838 the Gothic-style tower was added.	
All Saints Church (More images)		Warlingham; 51.3136°N 0.0560°W	Anglican	II*	Three Victorian restorations (in 1857, 1887 and 1893) "remov[ed] the village character" of this 13th-century flint-built church in the suburbanised village of Warlingham. In the last of these works, an aisle, chancel arch and vestry were added and the church was made 27 feet (8.2 m) wider. There is a 15th-century mural of Saint Christopher.	
St Christopher's Church (More images)		Warlingham; 51.3078°N 0.0411°W	Anglican	–	This was built as a mission church in Warlingham parish in 1907; it is situated between Warlingham and Chelsham. J.C. King's "pretty weatherboarded" chapel was not designed in any specific architectural style, and nor was the extension added in 1967.	
Warlingham Methodist Church (More images)		Warlingham; 51.3086°N 0.0510°W	Methodist	–	A Wesleyan chapel existed in the village by 1897: it was registered for marriages in January of that year. Its licence was cancelled in March 1961, and November 1961 the present building on Limpsfield Road was registered in its place.	
St Ambrose's Church (More images)		Warlingham; 51.3077°N 0.0541°W	Roman Catholic	–	There were many Roman Catholics in Warlingham by 1920, when Caterham's priest began to say Mass occasionally. This arrangement was formalised in 1936, when weekly Masses began in a house bought by the Archdiocese of Southwark. It was served from Caterham or Selsdon until it became independent in 1942, and Bernard Moss was commissioned to design the present church, built in 1957–58. It was registered in April 1958 in place of the house.	
St Luke's Church (More images)		Whyteleafe; 51.3080°N 0.0828°W	Anglican	–	Loosely Early English Gothic Revival in style and built of red brick, this church opened in the Whyteleafe suburb in 1886 and was immediately parished: its territory was carved out of Caterham, Coulsdon and Warlingham parishes.	
Whyteleafe Free Church (More images)		Whyteleafe; 51.3111°N 0.0791°W	Evangelical	–	Originally registered under the name Whyteleafe United Free Church, this building was certified for marriages in April 1935.	
Croydon Road Meeting Room		Whyteleafe; 51.2982°N 0.0711°W	Plymouth Brethren Christian Church	–	This building at the top of the main Croydon Road from Caterham has been registered for worship by Brethren since March 1995.	
Westhall Road Meeting Room (More images)		Whyteleafe; 51.3097°N 0.0780°W	Plymouth Brethren Christian Church	–	This building stands in the former goods yard next to Upper Warlingham railway station. It was registered in April 1989 and is part of a group of meeting rooms centred on a main Brethren meeting hall in Carshalton, south London.	
St Agatha's Church (More images)		Woldingham; 51.2772°N 0.0350°W	Anglican	–	This is Surrey's smallest parish church: its external dimensions are 30 1/4 feet (9.2 m) long by 20 feet 2 inches (6.15 m) wide, and the interior is a single room with just a screen dividing it. The gable-ended roof has a bellcot, and a gabled porch projects below this. The church was restored in 1831–32 but was nearly derelict again in 1890, when the porch was added.	
St Paul's Church (More images)		Woldingham; 51.2867°N 0.0370°W	Anglican	II	The present parish church of Woldingham is in the village centre and dates from 1933. Alexander Shaw, 2nd Baron Craigmyle (chairman of P&O) funded it and Herbert Baker was responsible for the "arch neo-Perpendicular" flint building. There is much flushwork inside and out, including some incorporating agate.	

== Former places of worship ==
Former places of worship
Name	Image	Location	Denomination/ Affiliation	Grade	Notes	Refs
Caterham Mission Church		Caterham; 51.2815°N 0.0757°W	Anglican	–	In 1867 a Church of England school was started in Caterham Valley, and it was decided to build a mission church to serve the valley as well. This red-brick building was erected in 1872 close to the site now occupied by St John the Evangelist's Church, which replaced it ten years later. At that time it was dismantled and moved to the other side of the Godstone Road, where it was converted into St John's National School. It served until 1975, when the remaining children moved to a new building, and after a period of disuse it was converted into a theatre and day centre, the Miller Centre. A blue plaque commemorating the building's history was unveiled in 2006.	
Oakhall Church (More images)		Caterham; 51.2888°N 0.0973°W	Non-denominational	–	E.E. Pickard, a missionary from Sevenoaks, ministered successfully in Caterham in the late 19th century, and Oak Hall—a 250-capacity mission hall—opened in Caterham on the Hill in September 1894 under his leadership. A Mr Thompson built it for £206; the land was acquired for £32.10s in May 1894. A new building was erected in the 1970s on the same site, but growth of the congregation resulted in its closure and replacement by a much larger church of the same name elsewhere in Caterham. The marriage registration, granted in July 1898, was cancelled in March 2019 when the new church was registered. Oahkhall Church still own the building and hire it out.	
St Agatha's Mission Hall (More images)		Hurst Green; 51.2434°N 0.0028°E	Anglican	–	A temporary hut built in the 1880s for navvies building the nearby railway line was replaced in 1895 by this combined hall and church. When St John the Evangelist's Church was built in the village in 1913, the building became its parish hall; but between 1988 and 1990 it held services again after a fire wrecked St John's.	
Hurst Green Methodist Church (More images)		Hurst Green; 51.2422°N 0.0046°E	Methodist	–	A Methodist congregation met in this modern building near Hurst Green railway station, which was registered for worship and for marriages in October 1961. It closed in August 2021.	
Chapel		Limpsfield; 51.2572°N 0.0152°E	Unknown (Nonconformist)	II	Now known as Chapel Cottage, this has been identified by English Heritage as an old Nonconformist chapel of the early 19th century. It is attached to a 17th-century house and has timber framing and painted brickwork. The roof is of slate. The façade of the chapel part steps forward and has a pediment with a blind oval recess in its tympanum. There are two arched windows to each storey.	
Salem Chapel (More images)		Lingfield; 51.1746°N 0.0176°W	Strict Baptist	–	The "neat little" chapel was founded in 1836 by William Killick from the church at Dormansland, and was initially known as Killick's Chapel. The brick building has a stuccoed façade and a slate roof with a gable end. The cause survived until the late 20th century, but the building has been converted into a restaurant.	
Lingfield Methodist Chapel (More images)		Lingfield; 51.1743°N 0.0160°W	Methodist	–	A Wesleyan Methodist church on Lingfield High Street was registered for worship in April 1912. It was replaced with Wesley Hall, a new building, in October 1930; but this has also fallen out of religious use and is now commercial premises. It was in the Redhill Methodist Circuit, and documents exist in its archive for the period 1906 to 1971.	
Outwood Baptist Church (More images)		Outwood; 51.1946°N 0.1025°W	Baptist	–	Baptist ministry began in the village in 1710 with the efforts of John Tasker, later pastor at Horsham General Baptist Chapel. A permanent church was later formed out of the Dormansland cause: a meeting at that chapel on 12 May 1834 agreed that a chapel should be built at Outwood, and it opened three months later at a cost of £225. The three-bay symmetrical façade was added to when a cottage was built on the west side. Later administered by the Home Counties Baptist Mission, the church closed in 1979 and was sold.	
Friends Meeting House (More images)		Oxted; 51.2562°N 0.0070°W	Quaker	–	This meeting house occupied part of an early 20th-century detached house on East Hill Road. It was bought in 1963, opened the following year and was registered in November 1964. It operated as one of eight Quaker meetings in the West Weald Area group, which covers parts of Surrey and West Sussex, but went out of use in about 2011. In 2015 it was stated that the community intended to sell the building.	
Ebenezer Chapel (More images)		Smallfield; 51.1770°N 0.1152°W	Strict Baptist	–	Joseph Hatton moved to Outwood Baptist Chapel to preach in 1849. He was not elected as pastor, but some church members preferred his ministry and seceded to form a new chapel under his leadership. Smallfield Chapel (later Ebenezer Chapel) opened in 1851 and was registered for marriages in July 1880. The walls are of brick, the façade is stuccoed and the name and date of the chapel are shown above the gabled porch. Its extensive churchyard has rare wooden grave-boards. The building became a veterinary surgery in the early 21st century.	
Tatsfield United Church		Tatsfield; 51.2970°N 0.0291°E	United Reformed Church	–	A Baptist chapel was built in the village in 1888, and by 1912 it was recorded as being in occasional use "for Nonconformist services of different kinds". After a period as a gospel hall, it was registered for the United Reformed Church in August 1964 but has now closed.	
New Gospel Hall		Tatsfield; 51.2950°N 0.0271°E	Open Brethren	–	This tin tabernacle replaced the original gospel hall (later United Reformed Church) in Tatsfield. It was registered for worship between February 1911 and August 1964. It is now used by the Women's Institute.	
St James's Church (More images)		Titsey; 51.2765°N 0.0189°E	Anglican	II*	The third church to serve the village was designed by J.L. Pearson in 1861 in a gritty, "crisp and hard" Gothic Revival style using sandstone from Limpsfield. It replaced one dated 1775–76 which in turn supplanted the original church built near Titsey Place. It was last used in 1960, declared redundant from 1 August 1973, and vested in the Titsey Trust in 1980; under their ownership it is classed as a "private chapel and monument". It has not been deconsecrated.	
St Andrew's Church		Warwick Wold; 51.2594°N 0.1222°W	Anglican	–	A chapel of ease was provided in the outlying hamlet of Warwick Wold in Bletchingley parish in 1912: the first service took place on 6 October of that year. It was sold for residential conversion after falling out of religious use in the mid-1970s.	

== Former places of worship demolished since 2000 ==
Former places of worship
Name	Image	Location	Denomination/ Affiliation	Grade	Notes	Refs
St Thomas of Canterbury's Church (More images)		Whyteleafe; 51.3083°N 0.0785°W	Roman Catholic	–	The church was designed by Broadbent and Partners architects (scheme architect J.F.G. Hastings) in a "modern Gothic [Revival]" style in 1961 and had two notable features: a distinctive and "dramatic" aluminium spire and good dalle de verre glass by Pierre Fourmaintraux of Whitefriars Glass, which tookup the whole wall of one west-facing room. Congregations declined, and the church closed in October 2010; planning permission for its demolition and replacement by flats was sought in April 2012, and work began in 2016.	

== Bibliography ==
- Body, Geoffrey (1984). Railways of the Southern Region. PSL Field Guides. Cambridge: Patrick Stephens Ltd. ISBN 0-85059-664-5.
- Chambers, Ralph (1952). The Strict Baptist Chapels of England: Surrey and Hampshire. Vol. 1. Thornton Heath: Ralph Chambers.
- Cleal, Edward E.; Crippen, T. G. (1908). The story of Congregationalism in Surrey. London: James Clarke & Co.
- Facey, Roy A., ed. (1981). International Church Index (Doctrinal). Index Publications. ISBN 0-907578-00-4.
- Hill, Roy (2002) [1990]. The Assemblies Address Book (PDF) (5th ed.). Bristol: Christian Year Publications. ISBN 1-872734-25-1. Archived from the original (PDF) on 19 September 2004.
- Hooper, T.R. (April 1928). "General Baptists in Surrey and Sussex. II: Baptists at Outwood" (PDF). Baptist Quarterly. 4 (2). Baptist Historical Society: 74–82. doi:10.1080/0005576X.1928.11750125. Archived (PDF) from the original on 21 May 2012.
- Methodist Church of Great Britain (1947). Methodist Church Buildings: Statistical Returns including Seating Accommodation as at July 1st, 1940 (PDF). Manchester: The Department for Chapel Affairs. (Available online in 14 parts; Guide to abbreviations on page 6)
- Nairn, Ian; Pevsner, Nikolaus (1971) [1962]. The Buildings of England: Surrey (2nd ed.). Harmondsworth: Penguin Books. ISBN 0-300-09675-5.
- Stell, Christopher (2002). Nonconformist Chapels and Meeting-houses in Eastern England. Swindon: English Heritage. ISBN 1-873592-50-7.
- s.n. (April 1983). "Outwood Chapel 1834–1979" (PDF). Baptist Quarterly. 30 (2). Baptist Historical Society: 90. doi:10.1080/0005576X.1983.11751628. Archived (PDF) from the original on 21 May 2012.
- Stockwell, Arthur H., ed. (1909). The Baptist Churches of Surrey. London: Arthur Stockwell.
- The Diocese of Arundel & Brighton (2019). Diocese of Arundel & Brighton Diocesan Directory 2019. Hove: Roman Catholic Diocese of Arundel and Brighton.
