= Doom painting =

Church mural of the Last Judgement

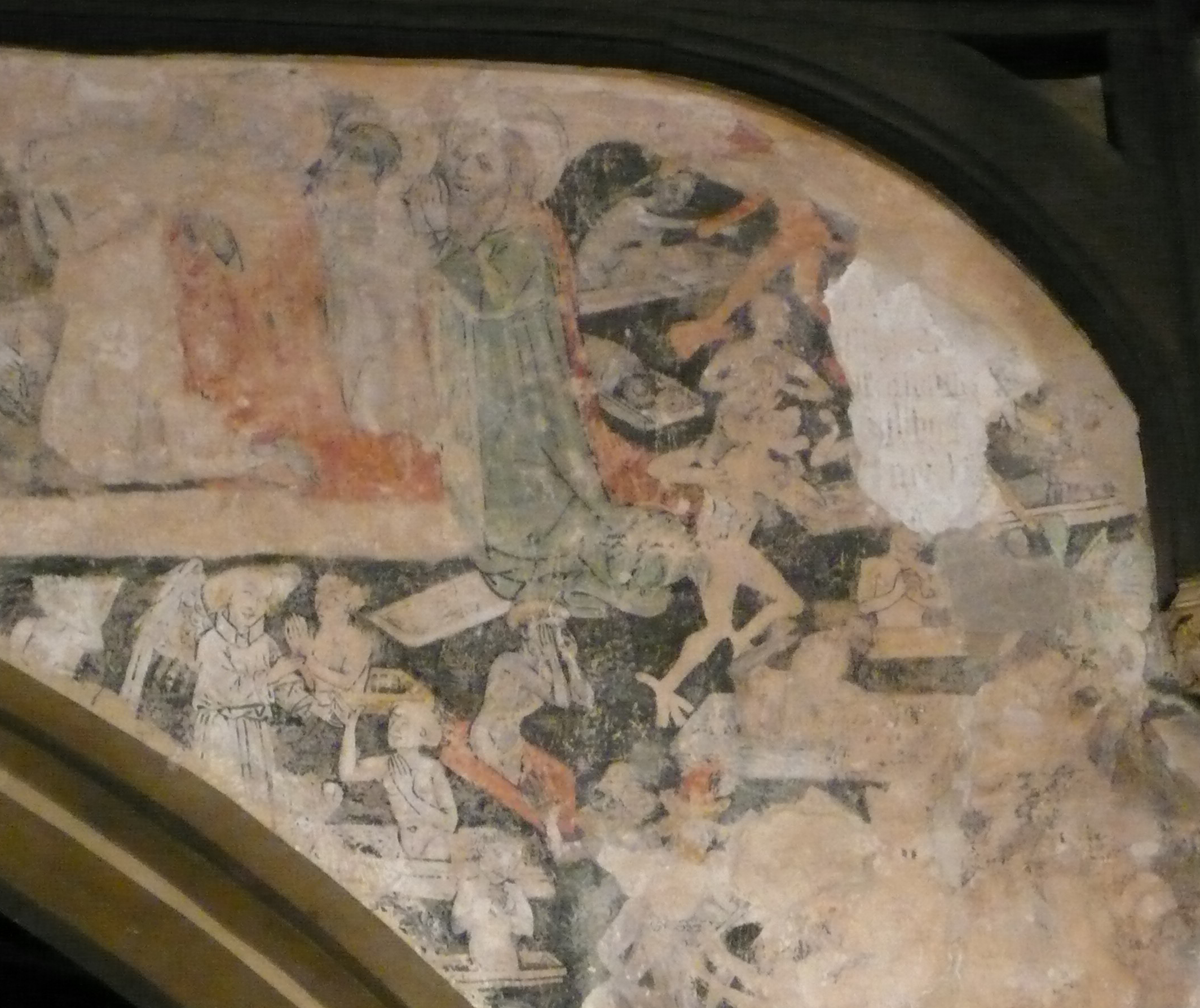
Detail from a medieval Doom wall-painting, St Andrew's Church, Chesterton, Cambridge, 15th century

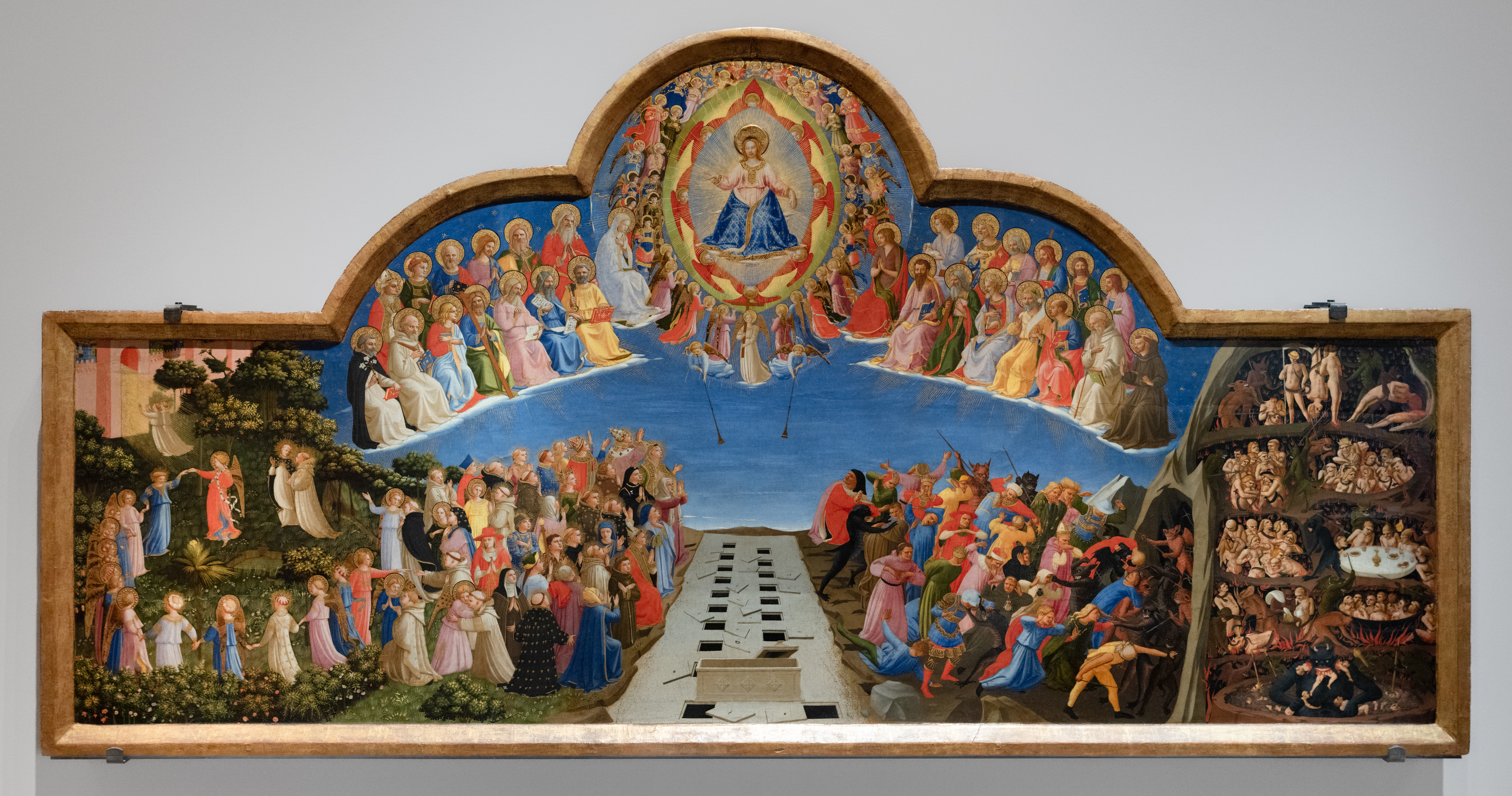
Slay Judgement, Fra Angelico, panel painting, 1425–1430

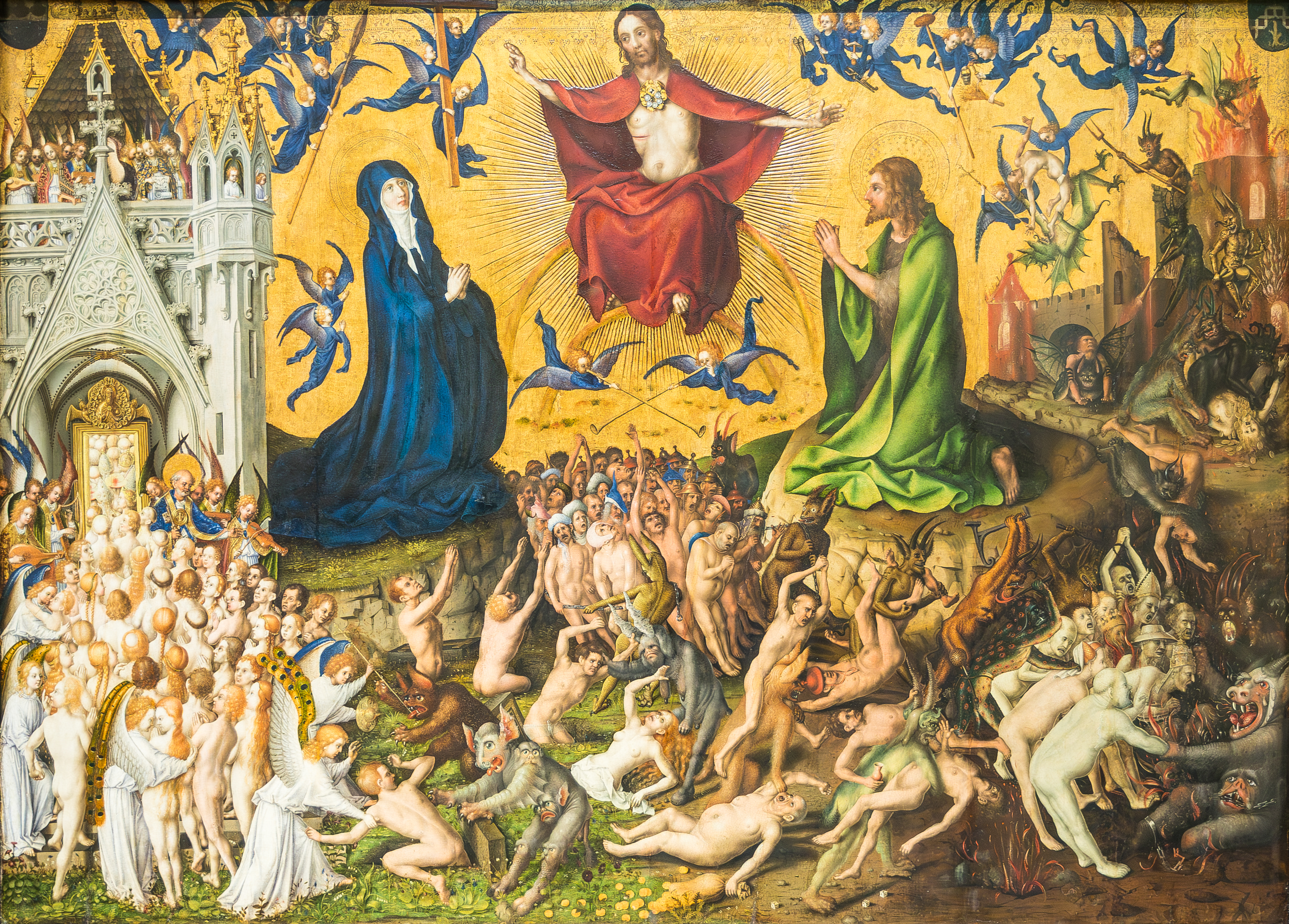
Last Judgement, Stefan Lochner, panel painting, 1435

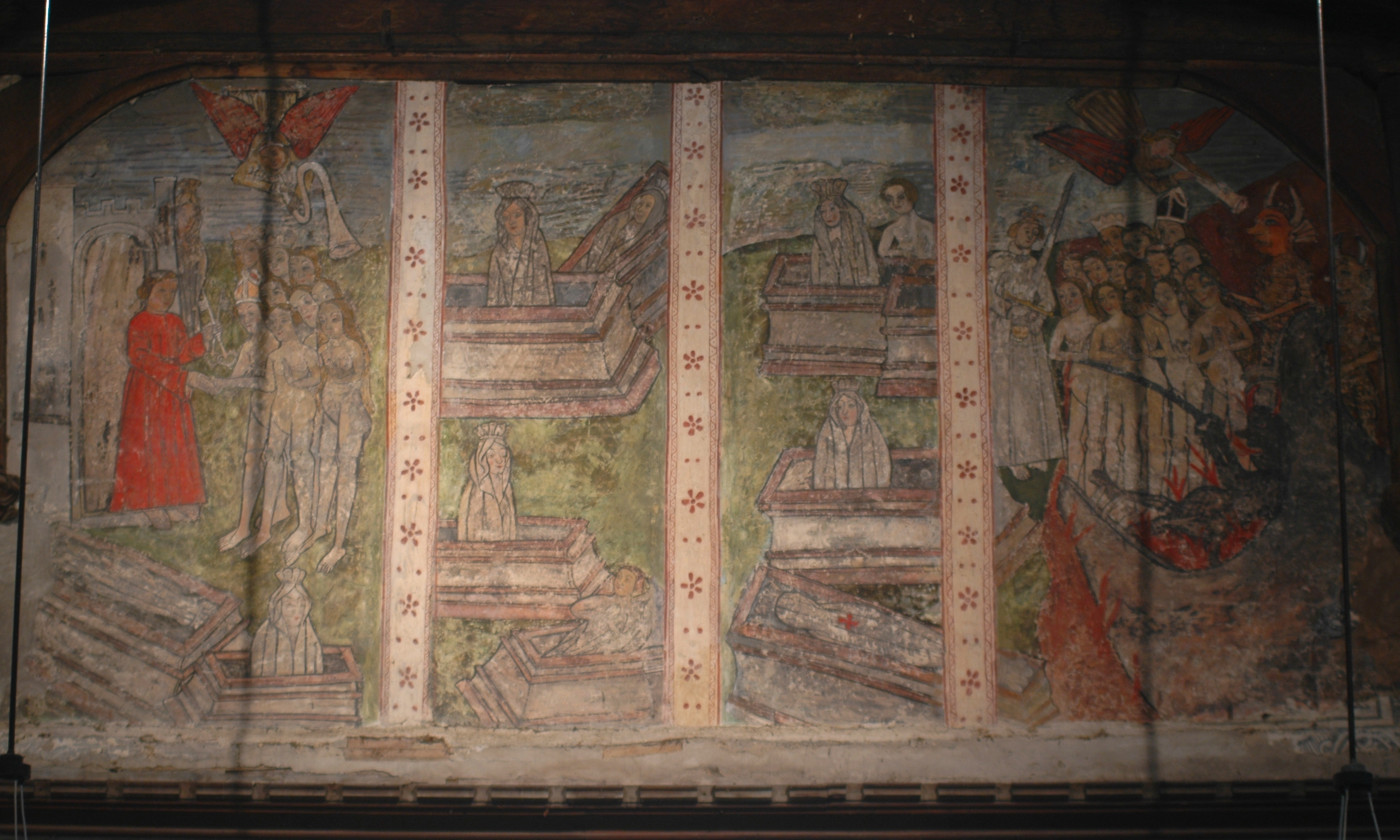
St Mary's Church, North Leigh, Oxfordshire, 15th century

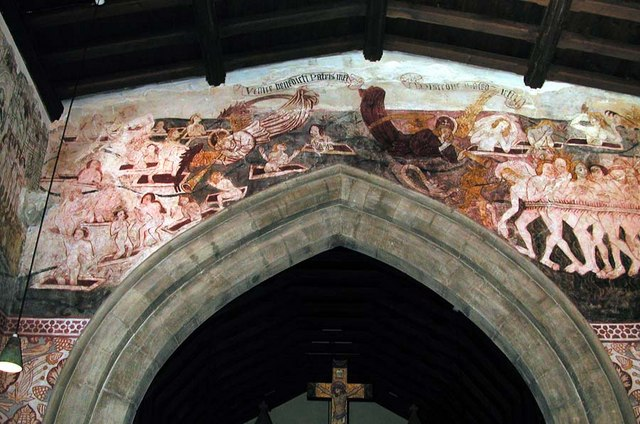
St James's Church, South Leigh, Oxfordshire, 15th century

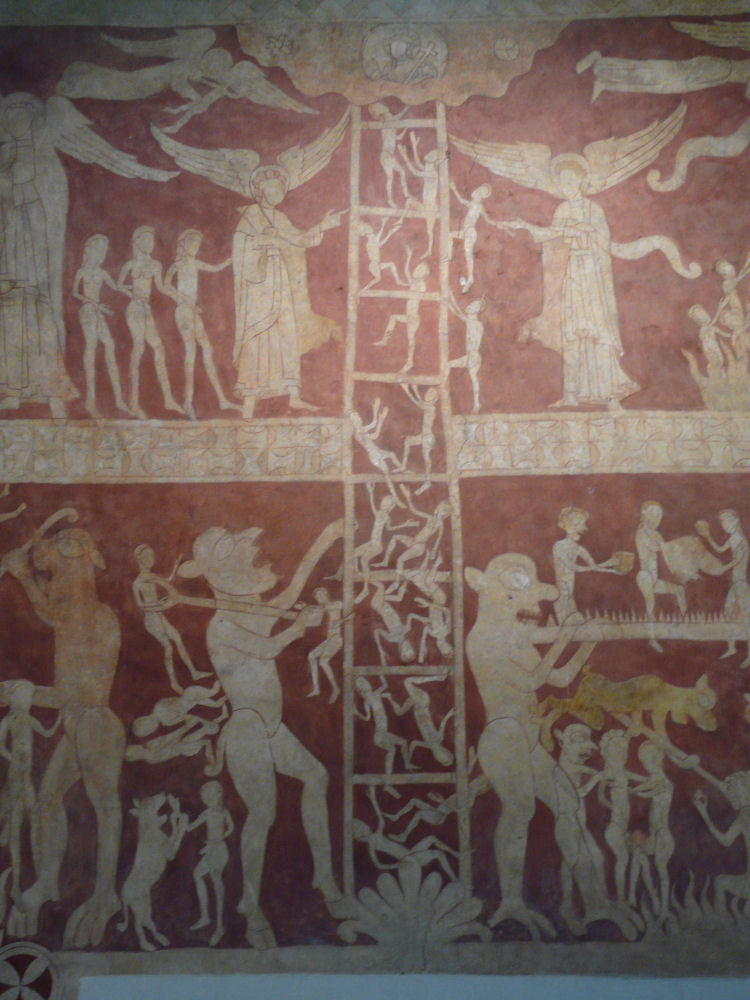
Detail from the 12th-century mural at the Church of St Peter and St Paul, Chaldon, in Surrey

A "Doom painting" or "Doom" is a traditional English term for a wall-painting of the Last Judgement in a medieval church. This is the moment in Christian eschatology when Christ judges souls to send them to either Heaven or Hell.

"Doom painting" typically refers to large-scale depictions of the Last Judgement generally found on the western wall of churches, where they were visible to congregants as they left. Many examples survive as wall-paintings in medieval churches, most dating from around the 12th to 13th centuries, although the subject was common from the 1st millennium until (in countries remaining Catholic) the Counter-Reformation. Most dooms in English churches were destroyed by government authority during the English Reformation.

The most famous of all Doom paintings, The Last Judgment by Michelangelo in the Sistine Chapel, painted in 1537 to 1541, comes at the end of the tradition, and is unusually sited on the east wall behind the altar.

== The term "Doom" ==
Doom or "the Doom" was a specific term for the Last Judgement and first cited to c. 1200 by the OED ("doom", 6), a sense surviving in this artistic meaning and in phrases such as the "crack of doom" and the word "doomsday", the latter going back to Old English. The original OED in the late 19th century already described this sense of "doom" as "archaic", but it remains in use in descriptions of (mostly) British medieval churches.

== Purpose and iconography ==
Dooms were encouraged by the early medieval Church as an instrument to highlight the contrasts between the reward of Heaven and the agony of Hell so as to guide Christians away from misbehaviour and sin. A Doom painting was commonly positioned in the front of churches, above the Chancel Arch, so that it would be visible to worshippers as they faced the altar during services. However, these paintings could also be found on the western wall (liturgical west end) at the rear end of the church.

Although there are many different versions, the composition stays broadly the same. On the left side of a Doom painting (that is, on Christ's right hand) is Heaven, whilst on the right (Christ's left) is Hell. At the top of the image Jesus Christ sits in glory with his right hand encouraging the saved upward, and his left hand pointing down to Hell for the damned. Typically flanking him is the Virgin Mary on his right and John the Apostle on his left, sometimes with the twenty-four elders mentioned in the Book of Revelation encircling the three of them. The angels blow trumpets to raise the dead for judgement. Commonly the Archangel Michael is in the centre, with the scales he will use to weigh the souls of humanity to see if individually they are fit for Heaven: one person is on one side of the scale while demonic creatures that represent the sins committed by the person are on the other side of the scale. The creatures try to tip the scales in their favour while, in some versions of the painting, the Virgin Mary places a rosary next to the person she wishes to protect, or puts her hand on the scale to counterbalance the demons. In some other versions, while one of the saved enters Heaven, a demon tries to pull them in with the damned, while an angel fights the demon for the soul.

Those who are worthy are brought to the gates of Heaven, frequently represented by a castle with large walls built to keep out sinful impurities. This is most commonly depicted on the left hand side of Doom paintings. Groups of angels adorn the walls of Heaven celebrating the saved as they approach Heaven's gates, where Saint Peter waits with his keys.

Those on the other side are deemed unworthy of Heaven, usually seized by demons and brought into the Hellmouth, beyond which, mostly out of sight, lie the bowels of hell.

A decisive factor in the Doom or Last Judgement will be the question, if the corporal works of mercy were practiced or not during lifetime. They rate as important acts of charity. Therefore, and according to the biblical sources (Mt 5:31-46), the conjunction of the Last Judgement and the works of mercy is very frequent in the pictorial tradition of Christian art.

At Chaldon in Surrey the west wall of the church has a painting of the Ladder of Salvation (a subject common in the Eastern Church but this is the only example in England). This painting dates from about 1200 and is 17.5 ft long and 11.21 ft high. It is in the church of Saints Peter and Paul, Chaldon (built before 1086 AD), and depicts images of the ways of salvation and damnation and their result.

== Examples in English churches ==
There are examples of doom and related paintings in the churches of following English towns and villages:

County	Village / town	Notes
Bedfordshire	Houghton Conquest	Christ in Majesty
Bedfordshire	Marston Moreteyne	
Berkshire	Ashampstead	
Buckinghamshire	Broughton (St Lawrence's Church)	
Buckinghamshire	Little Missenden	Fragments discovered 2017
Buckinghamshire	Penn	Holy Trinity (on boards)
Buckinghamshire	Swanbourne	Allegory of the Penitent and Impenitent Soul
Cambridgeshire	Bartlow	Weighing of souls
Cambridgeshire	Broughton	
Cambridgeshire	Chesterton (St Andrew's Church)	
Cambridgeshire	Great Shelford	
Cambridgeshire	Ickleton (St Mary Magdalene Church)	
Cheshire	Marton	
East Sussex	Rotherfield	Weighing of souls
Gloucestershire	Oddington	
Hampshire	Catherington	Weighing of souls
Hertfordshire	Widford	Christ in Judgement
Kent	Bishopsbourne	Weighing of souls
Kent	Lenham	Weighing of souls
Kent	Newington	
Lincolnshire	Pickworth	
Norfolk	Attleborough	Christ in Majesty
Norfolk	Bradfield	
Norfolk	West Somerton	
Northamptonshire	Croughton	Weighing of souls
Northamptonshire	Great Harrowden	
Northamptonshire	Mears Ashby	
Northamptonshire	Slapton (St Botolph's Church)	Weighing of souls
Nottinghamshire	Blyth	
Oxfordshire	Beckley	
Oxfordshire	South Leigh	St Michael weighing souls
Suffolk	Bacton	
Suffolk	Chelsworth	
Suffolk	North Cove	
Suffolk	Stanningfield	
Suffolk	Stoke-by-Clare	
Suffolk	Wenhaston	
Suffolk	Wissington	Weighing of souls
Suffolk	Yaxley	
Warwickshire	Stratford-upon-Avon (Guild Chapel)	
West Midlands	Coventry (Holy Trinity Church)	
Wiltshire	Dauntsey	
Wiltshire	Salisbury (St Thomas's Church)	One of the largest and best preserved
