= Church of St Peter and St Paul, Chaldon =

Church of St Peter and St Paul,
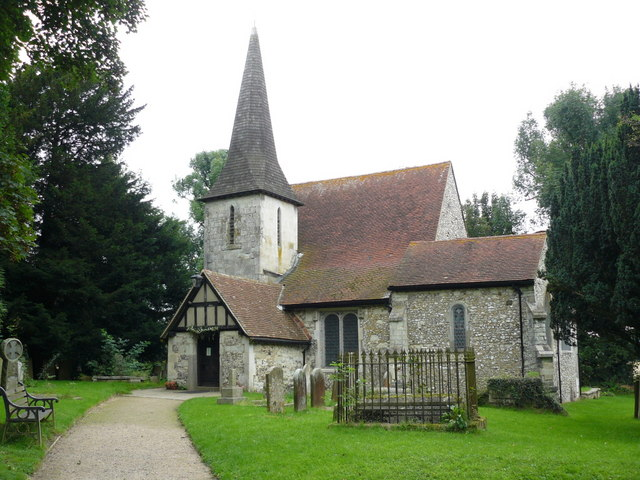

- Location in Surrey
- 51°17′07″N 0°07′29″W
- Country: England
- Denomination: Anglican
- Website: www.chaldonchurch.co.uk

History
- Founded: before 1086 AD

Administration
- Diocese: Diocese of Southwark

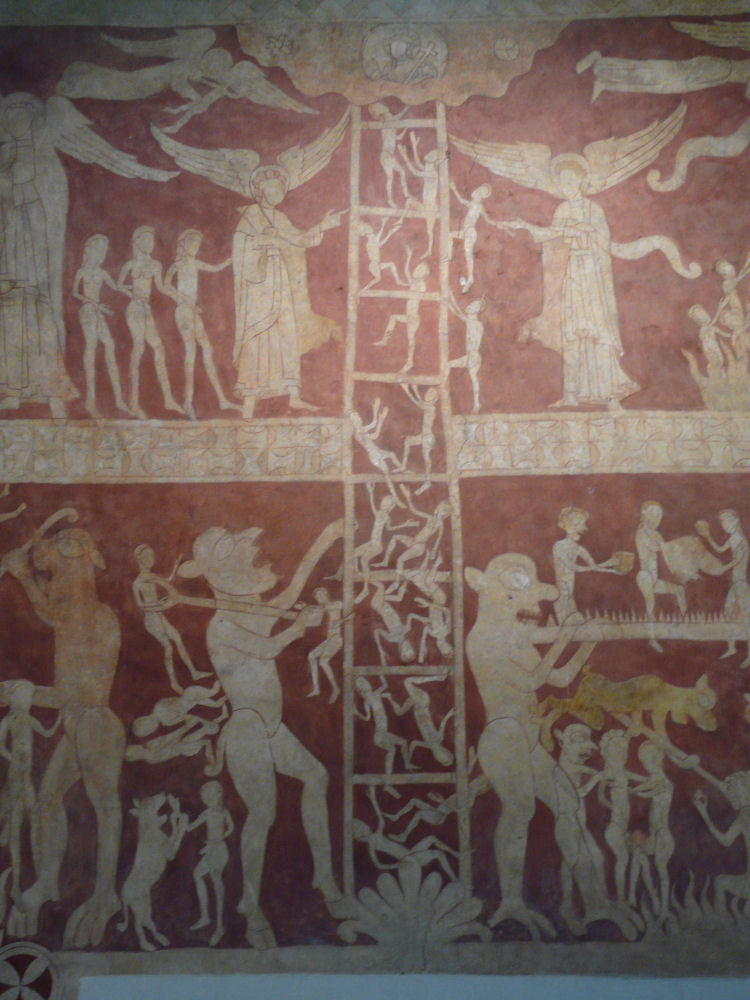
Detail from the 12th-century Doom painting on the west wall of the church

The Church of Saints Peter and Paul at Chaldon, Surrey, is a Church of England parish church in the Diocese of Southwark. The building was begun before 1086 and is Grade I listed. It is notable for containing a large mural dating from around 1170, depicting images of the Last Judgement and purgatory.

== Building ==
The small church is divided into a nave and chancel. The nave has a two-bay arcade on the north and south sides which leads into aisles. The east end of the south aisle leads into a chapel dedicated to St Catherine, while the west end forms the base of the tower and is adjoined by the south porch. A vestry abuts the west end of the north aisle.

The east and west walls of the church likely date from the eleventh century, while the remainder of the church is predominantly 12th and 13th century. The major exceptions are St Catherine's chapel, which was partially rebuilt and given a new window in the early 14th century, and the tower built in 1843. There is a blocked arch at the end of the north aisle which suggests there was once also a chapel on this side of the chancel. The church windows have also been altered several times; those in the north aisle date from 1330, the wide chancel window from 1460, and the south aisle window is early 17th century. There is an Easter Sepulchre in the chancel dating from the fourteenth century, and the pulpit dates from 1657.

== Wall painting ==
The mural on the west wall of the nave was only discovered during restoration works in 1870-1. The background is of red tempera, while the figures are a lighter red or pink. The mural has been described as "perhaps the most interesting ancient wall-painting in England" and as "one of the most important English wall paintings" of its date. A figure of a demon was discovered on the north aisle at the same time, but was destroyed.

The overall scheme combines several iconographic subjects, including the Last Judgement, the Harrowing of Hell, and the Ladder of Salvation. The painting is divided in two by a cloudy band. The lower half contains demons and depictions of sin, and the upper half the judgement and the salvation of souls. In the centre is a ladder, with Christ in a nimbus at the top. The main figures of the lower half include two demons boiling sinners in a cauldron, two demons holding a saw on which balance sinners, and the Tree of Knowledge with the Serpent. Representations of the Seven deadly sins surround these scenes. The upper half depicts the Harrowing of Hell to the right and the Archangel Michael weighing souls to the left.

Pevsner describes the subject as 'rare' and describes it as a 'Purgatorial Ladder', while Malden links it to a style developed in the Greek Orthodox Church, particularly a type called 'The Ladder of the Salvation of the Soul and the Road to Heaven'.

== See also ==
- List of places of worship in Tandridge District
