= Jessie Gilbert =

British chess player (1987–2006)

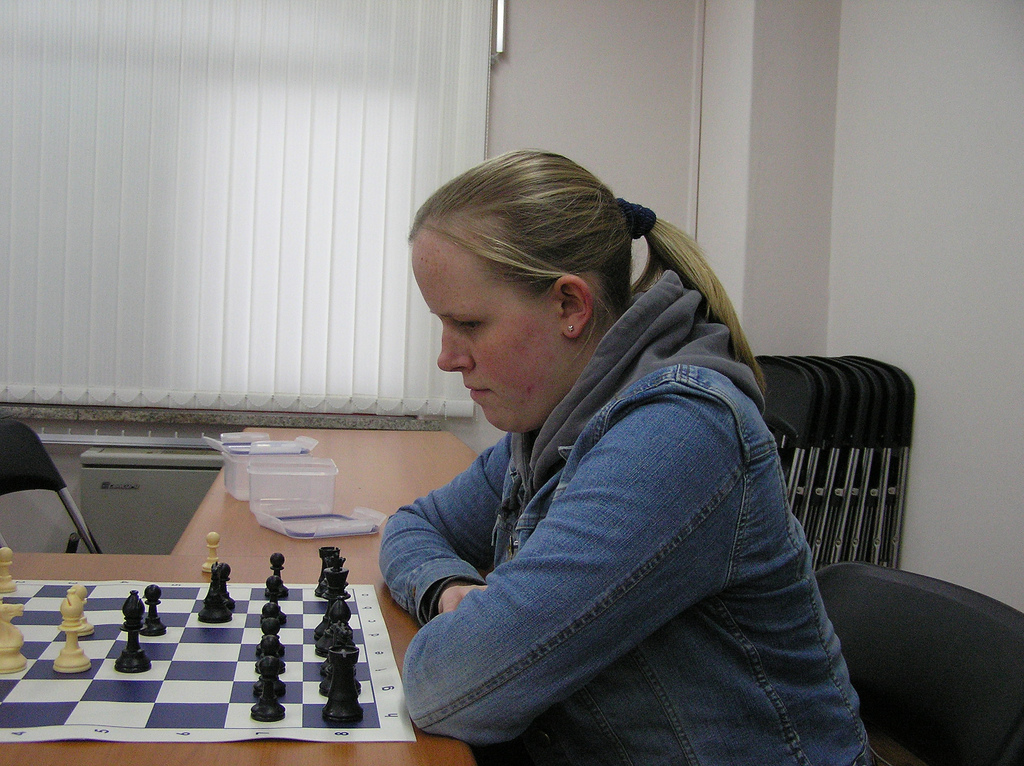

Personal information
- Born: 30 January 1987 Woldingham, Surrey, England
- Died: 26 July 2006 (aged 19) Pardubice, Czech Republic

Chess career
- Title: Woman FIDE Master (1999)
- Peak rating: 2151 (July 2005)

Jessica "Jessie" Laura Cory Gilbert (30 January 1987 – 26 July 2006) was a British chess player. She was women's world amateur champion in 1999.

== Biography ==
Jessica was the daughter of Angela and Ian Gilbert and was raised in Woldingham, Surrey. She attended Croydon High School. Her father was a career manager with the Royal Bank of Scotland. Gilbert's parents had separated in 2003, and Jessica was living in Reigate with her mother and siblings, while her father had remarried to a lawyer named Sally, and lived in Hackney, east London.

Jessica Gilbert had represented England in every major chess competition from the age of 12, and came to prominence when she won the Women's World Amateur Chess Championship in January 1999 at Hastings. She was mentioned in a parliamentary debate by the then sports minister, Tony Banks, who said: "We are extremely proud of what Jessie Gilbert has achieved for chess and for this country."

Thanks to this victory, she also gained the title of Woman FIDE Master (WFM) from the game's governing body, FIDE. In recognition of her achievement, the Brain Trust charity and Swedish health care company Bure provided Gilbert with a bursary of £4000 so that she could travel to U.S. to study with grandmaster Edmar Mednis in New York City.

Gilbert had won a place at the University of Oxford to study medicine from September 2005, but decided to take a gap year in order to spend time focused solely on chess. In the space of only a few months in early 2006, Gilbert achieved three "norms" in major chess tournaments.

== Death ==
On the night of 26 July 2006, she fell from the eighth floor of the Hotel Labe, in Pardubice, Czech Republic, where she was playing at the Czech Open. On the evening of her death, it was reported she had consumed beer and vodka from the room's minibar. Jessica had been sharing the room with a 14-year-old friend and fellow chess player. Her friend got up to visit the bathroom sometime in the early morning. When she returned, Jessica was missing, and the friend assumed that she had gone for a walk.

Some of her acquaintances came forward to claim that Jessica was a sleepwalker, and that she could have fallen to her death through the window, which would have been left open due to the hot weather in Europe at the time. But the authorities and the Czech Open organizer Jiri Petruzalek pointed to suicide as the cause. Jessica was said to be taking anti-depressants, and it was later revealed that she had a history of self-harm and had tried suicide previously using paracetamol tablets.

On 27 September 2007, the inquest into Jessica's death recorded an open verdict.

=== Trial of Ian Gilbert ===
Two days following her death, it emerged that her father, Ian Gilbert, had previously been charged with seven counts of rape and two counts of indecent assault. The charges were said to relate to more than one victim. British police would not name the alleged victims, but confirmed that one of them was dead. On 29 July 2006, the British press began to name Jessica Gilbert as one of the victims.

At the time of Jessica's death, Mr Gilbert had not yet entered a plea to the charges. If she had lived, and he had pleaded not guilty, that would have raised the prospect of Jessica having to give evidence against her father, and being cross-examined by his barrister. Mr Gilbert was released on bail, pending his case starting at Guildford Crown Court on 21 August 2006. On 31 July 2006, the Crown Prosecution Service said that they would be reviewing the case in the light of the media coverage of Jessica Gilbert's death.

On 14 December 2006, Mr Gilbert was found not guilty of all charges against him. He speculated that Jessie had accused him as the means of revenge after some arguments they had. Two days later it was reported that Angela Gilbert had been arrested on suspicion of threatening to kill her ex-husband, although she was later released and the Crown Prosecution Service decided not to proceed with the case.
