= Church of St John the Baptist, Outwood =

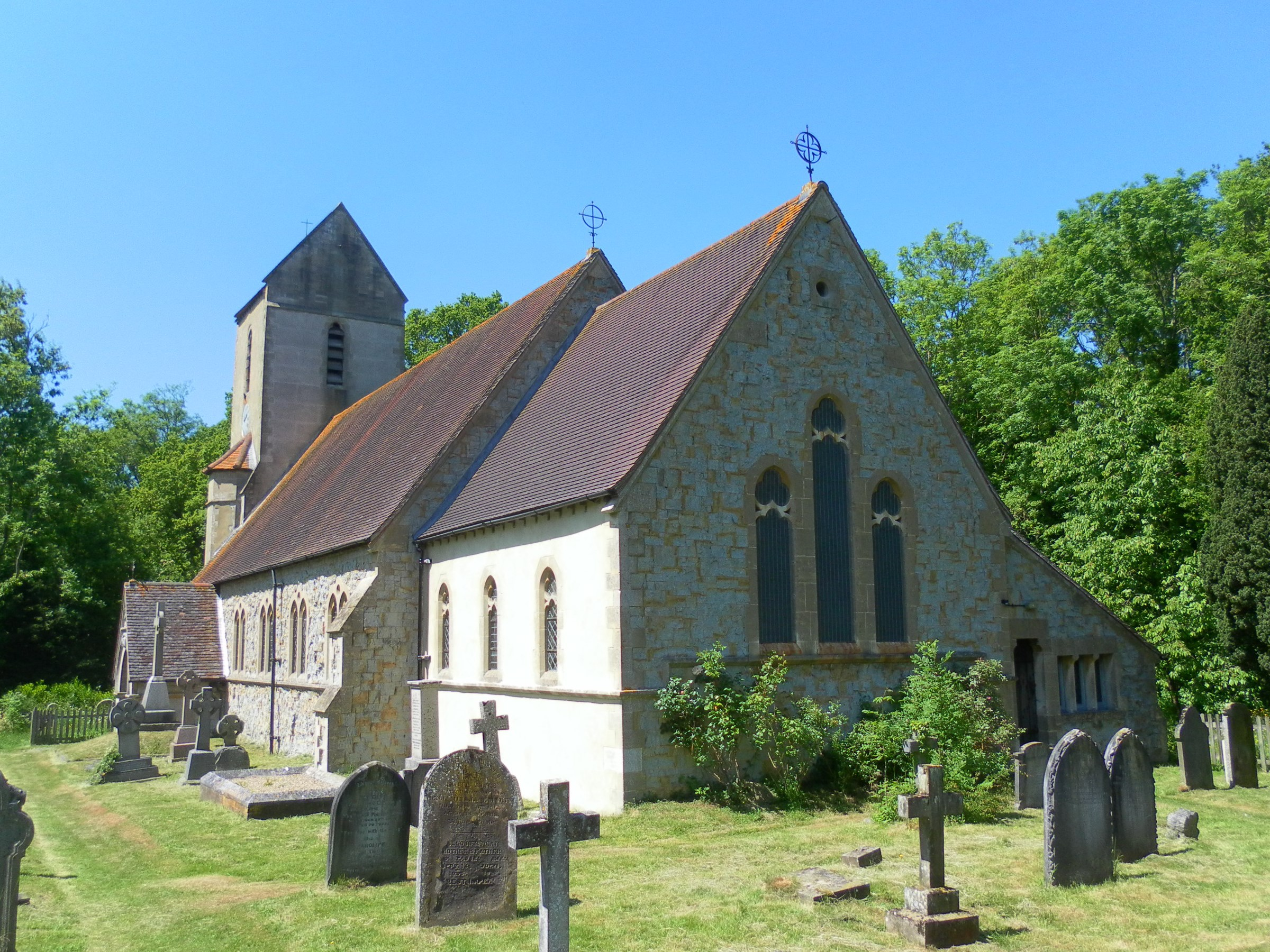
- St John the Baptist, Outwood

- Location in Surrey
- 51°11′54″N 0°06′46″W
- Location: Brickfield Road, Outwood, Surrey
- Country: England
- Denomination: Church of England
- Website: http://www.windmillchurches.co.uk

History
- Status: Parish Church
- Dedicated: 1869

Architecture
- Architect(s): William Burges; W.P. Manning
- Architectural type: Church
- Style: Plain lancet/Anglo-Norman (revival), Grade II listed

Specifications
- Capacity: c.150

Administration
- Diocese: Anglican Diocese of Southwark
- Parish: Outwood

Clergy
- Bishop: Bishop of Southwark
- Vicar: Rev. Alan Bayes
- Dean: Dean of Tandridge

The Church of St John the Baptist, Outwood, is the parish church of Outwood, Surrey, England.

== Clergy and style of worship ==
Part of the Diocese of Southwark, the style of worship is traditional and its Christmas Eve services are an afternoon crib service with candles and midnight mass. This is preceded on a preceding Sunday by a carol service. The clergy serve the parishes Burstow and Horne as one benefice.

== Building, setting and amenities ==
Architecture

The early medieval style building was built in 1869 and designed by William Burges. Its tower of 1876 is by W. P. Manning featuring a half-octagonal projection (bastion) beside one of its two buttresses and near the modest porch. The interior has a simple brick design, whilst the exterior is of knapped stone with a stuccoed tower over brick. The church is a Grade II listed building. J. Mordaunt Crook describes it as "outspoken to the point of bluntness", and Nairn comments that it is "honest, but not very good".

Setting

The church is bounded on three sides by land owned by the National Trust: a farm, common meadow and dense woodland. The church has a vestry housing robes for choir and clergy. The church has a maintained graveyard surrounding.

Amenities

The exterior of the church is in local Reigate Stone and the interior is brick with timbered beams and an acorn-shaped strip wood ceiling. The interior brick finish is intricate pointing, a showcase of Victorian workmanship. The building is heated and supplied with electricity.

== Parish ==
Outwood is a parish of the Church of England which overlaps its civil parish. This area's nearest town is Horley and has a high proportion of farms and cottages on radiating rural roads making it somewhat dispersed. The church is 0.5 miles (0.80 km) from the nucleus of the village and faces a junction with the last house of a road leading directly to the village.

The current parish was formed on 19 August 1870 from parts of five medieval parishes; Burstow, Blechingley, Horley, Horne, and Nutfield, surrounding villages, a close cluster being Burstow (its most populous part being the mainly late 20th century village Smallfield) and Horne.

== Other ==
Bell ringing is practised on Monday evenings.

== See also ==
- Diocese of Southwark
- List of places of worship in Tandridge (district)
