= HMS Woldingham =

Minesweeper of the Royal Navy

History

United Kingdom
- Name: HMS Woldingham
- Namesake: Woldingham
- Builder: J. Samuel White
- Launched: 30 November 1955
- Completed: 17 July 1957
- Fate: Sold September 1966

General characteristics
- Class & type: Ham-class minesweeper
- Notes: Pennant number(s): M2778 / IMS78

HMS Woldingham was one of 93 ships of the Ham-class of inshore minesweepers.

Their names were all chosen from villages ending in -ham. The minesweeper was named after Woldingham in Surrey.
