= Woldingham =

Village and parish in Kent, England

Coordinates: 51.28669°N 0.03825°W

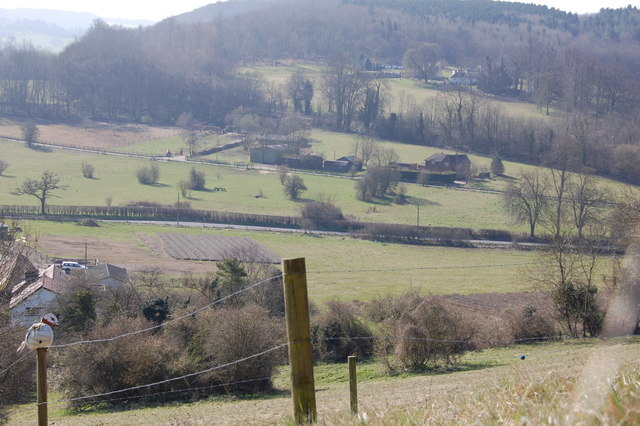
- Woldingham Road; Woldingham

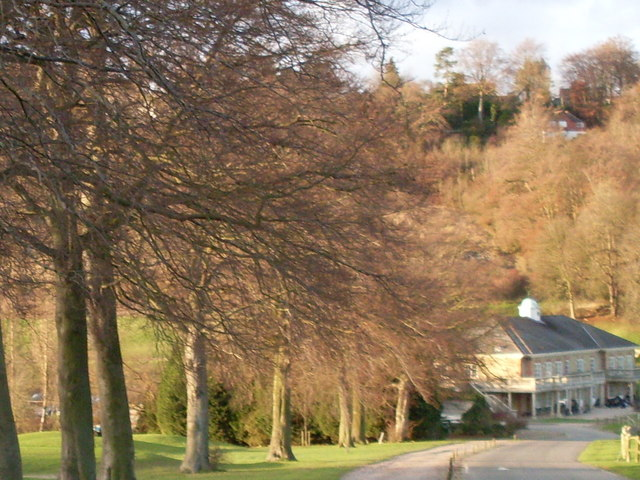
- Woldingham Golf Club

- Location within Kent
- Area: 10.87 km^{2} (4.20 sq mi)
- Population: 2,141 (Civil Parish 2011)
  - Density: 197/km^{2} (510/sq mi)
- OS grid reference: TQ369560
  - London: 17.5 miles (28.2 km)
- Civil parish: Woldingham
- District: Tandridge
- Shire county: Kent
- Region: South East
- Country: England
- Sovereign state: United Kingdom
- Post town: Caterham
- Postcode district: CR3
- Dialling code: 01883
- Police: Kent
- Fire: Kent
- Ambulance: South East Coast
- UK Parliament: Kent

Woldingham is a village and civil parish high on the North Downs between Oxted and Warlingham in Surrey, England, within the M25, 17.5 miles (28.2 km) southeast of London. The village has 2,141 inhabitants, many of whom commute to London, making Woldingham part of the London commuter belt. The village is served by the Oxted line and central London can be reached in 33 minutes by train.

== History ==
=== Early history ===
Two bronze fibulae, some stone arrow-heads and celts were found here about 1800.

=== Dark and Middle Ages ===
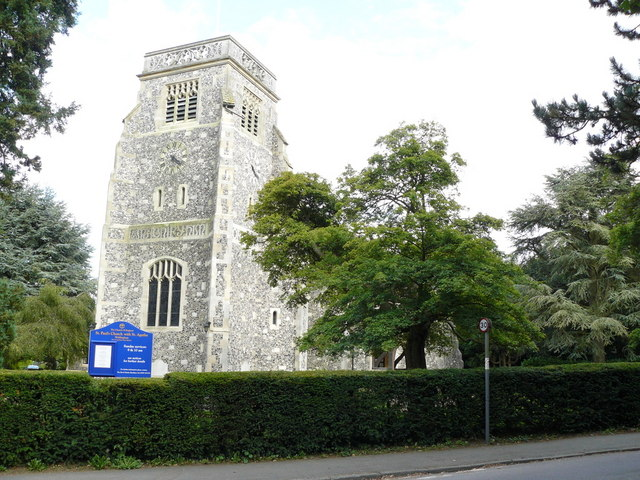
The imposing tower of St Paul's Church, Woldingham, built in 1933 by Sir Herbert Baker.

The place-name 'Woldingham' is first attested in the Domesday Book of 1086, where it appears as Wallingeham. It appears as Waldingham in the Close Rolls of 1232, and as Waldingeham in 1242 in the Book of Fees. The name means "the village or homestead of the people of the Weald or wood".

The village lay within the Anglo-Saxon administrative division of Tandridge hundred, and was held by John in 1086 from Richard Fitz Gilbert. Its Domesday assets were: 1 hide. It had 4½ ploughs. It rendered £1. No church is mentioned in Woldingham in the Domesday Survey. A chapel, now rebuilt as St Agatha's Church, is first mentioned in 1295 as appurtenant to Gilbert de Clare's part of Woldingham; there has always been a vicar rather than a rector.

=== Upper Court Manor ===
Upper Court Manor was owned by a series of high-profile nobles indicating its wealth: including Gilbert de Clare; Ralph, Earl of Stafford; grandson Hugh of Woldingham; Humphrey Earl of Stafford then created first Duke of Buckingham; his third son John, Earl of Wiltshire and son; Edward, Duke of Buckingham, who was attainted and beheaded in 1521 leaving it for Henry VIII to grant; John Bourchier Lord Berners, Deputy of Calais; Sir John Gresham and his family held until sale to Henry Bynes; William Bryant who purchased it for £3,600 in 1795; followed by a Mr Withers, Jones and Gifford.

=== Nether Court Manor ===
This manor started similarly with Gilbert de Clare. Less notable nobles followed generally except for: Sir Guy Ferre's wife, Sir Thomas Uvedale and great-grandson of the same name and rank (not inherited), Edward Duke of Buckingham and John Gresham of London.

=== Marden Park Manor ===
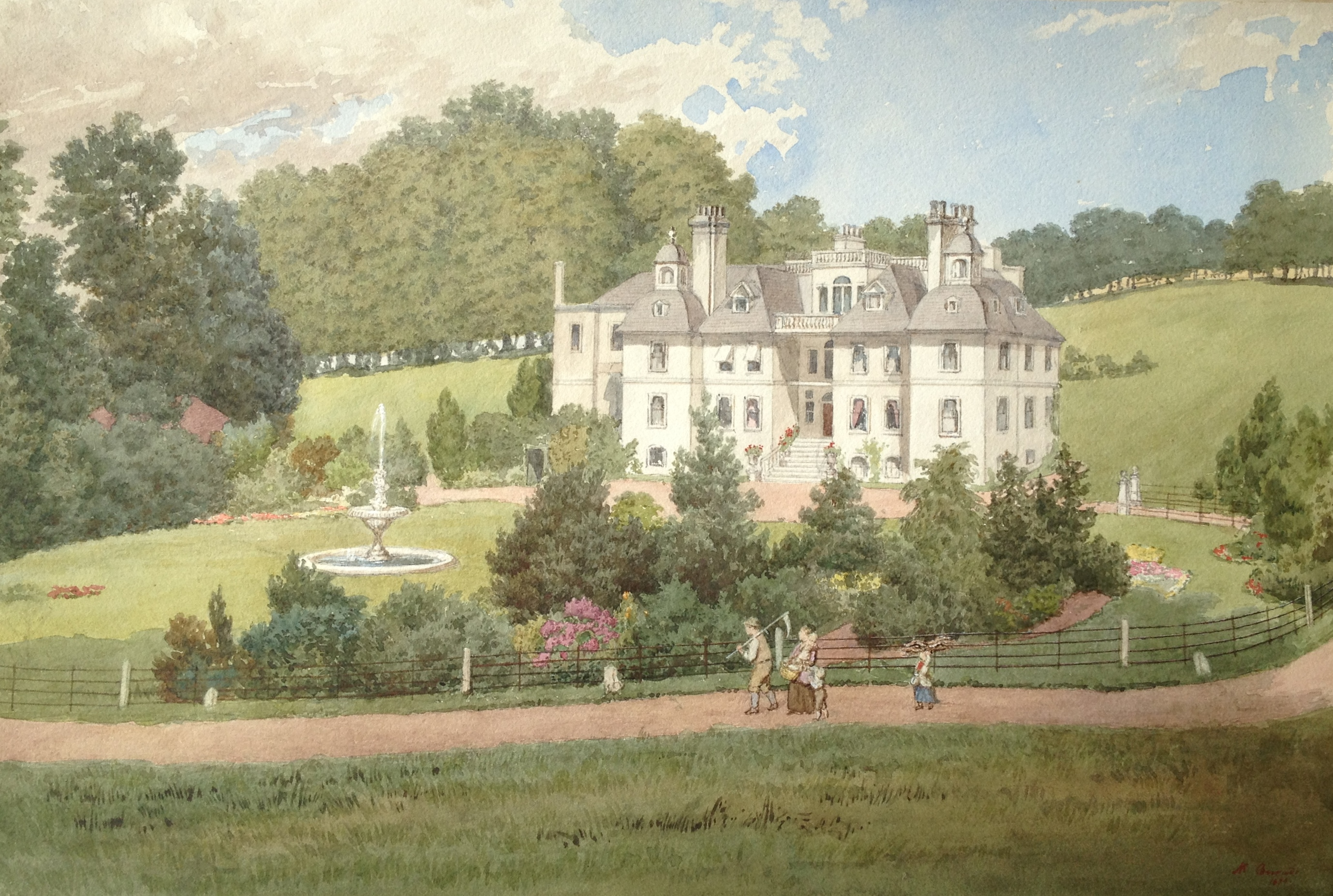
Painting of Marden Park Manor Surrey, c. 1869

It appears that the manor-houses of Marden and Lagham were centres of population until the inhabitants were nearly exterminated by the Black Death of 1349. Marden Park, formerly a manor, owned much of the area, however it was until some point after 1911 part of the parish of Godstone.

This was half of the manor of Walkhampstead held by Richard de Lucy, had also come into the possession of the St. Johns of Lagham by the middle of the 13th century. They held it of the king in chief as of the honour of Boulogne by the service of a quarter of a knight's fee. Marden followed the same descent as Lagham Manor until after the death of Thomas St. Clare, when this manor went to Eleanor, one of his daughters and co-heirs, who married John Gage; then held by William Gage, their son and heir, at his death in 1497. In 1506 John Gage sold it to Sir David Owen, who also held Lagham. His son John Owen afterwards owned Marden, which, after passing through the hands of James Altham and John Elliott successively, came to Thomas Powle in 1561. During his tenure a petition was lodged against him by Henry son of John Owen, who stated that the latter's conveyance to Altham was a mortgage and that Owen had redeemed this estate, but the appeal was apparently dismissed, as Thomas Powle continued to hold and sold the manor to George Evelyn in 1588. George settled it on his son Robert on the latter's marriage in 1590. Robert apparently conveyed Marden, as he did Walkhampstead, to his brother John, whose son George afterwards held, and died seised in 1636. Sir John Evelyn (George's son), conveyed Marden to his younger brother Arthur, and it was conveyed by Arthur to his uncle Sir John. John Evelyn, eldest son of the latter, created a baronet in 1660, married first Mary Farmer and secondly Anne Glynne. He died without issue in 1671, his brother George Evelyn (1641–1699) being his heir, but before his death he had made a conveyance of Marden, together with the manor of Flower in this parish, to one Mary Gittings, with whom he had lived for several years prior to his death. She sold the manor in 1672 to Robert Clayton (afterwards Sir Robert) and John Morris, partners in business. Morris afterwards released to Clayton, in whose family Marden remained until it was sold shortly before 1911 to Sir Walpole Greenwell.

Marden Park is about a mile and a half to the north of Godstone, and was formerly the seat of Sir Robert Clayton, Lord Mayor of London, who died in 1707. From him it passed to his nephew Sir William Clayton, 1st Baronet and thence to the latter's son Sir Kenrick Clayton, 2nd Baronet.

William Wilberforce lived here towards the close of the 18th century, several of his letters being dated from the house. It was in 1911 the residence of Sir Walpole Lloyd Greenwell. Today's mansion was re-erected to the west of the original site. It is built in the style of a French chateau and is approached by a drive a mile in length through the park. The grounds, to quote from the inscription on Clayton's monument in Bletchingley Church, are "a remarkable instance of the politeness of his Genius, and how far Nature may be improv'd by Art". The stables of the original mansion still remain.

The mill mentioned in the Domesday Book as being in the manor of Walkhampstead became appurtenant to Marden on the division; it was generally said to be worth 20s. or 30s. a year, but an inquisition taken in 1349 after the Black Death stated that the mill was out of repair and had brought in nothing that year, as all who used to come there to grind were dead. The same inquisition gives further proof of the ravages worked here by the plague; perquisites of court both here and at Lagham were this year nothing, as the tenants who owed suit were nearly all dead, the capital messuages (houses and land) of both had deteriorated in value owing to the pestilence, and the pasture was valueless because it had not been let to farm. An old cottage standing back from the high road to the station near the entrance to Bullbeggar's Lane is still known as the Pest House.

=== Post-Industrial Revolution ===
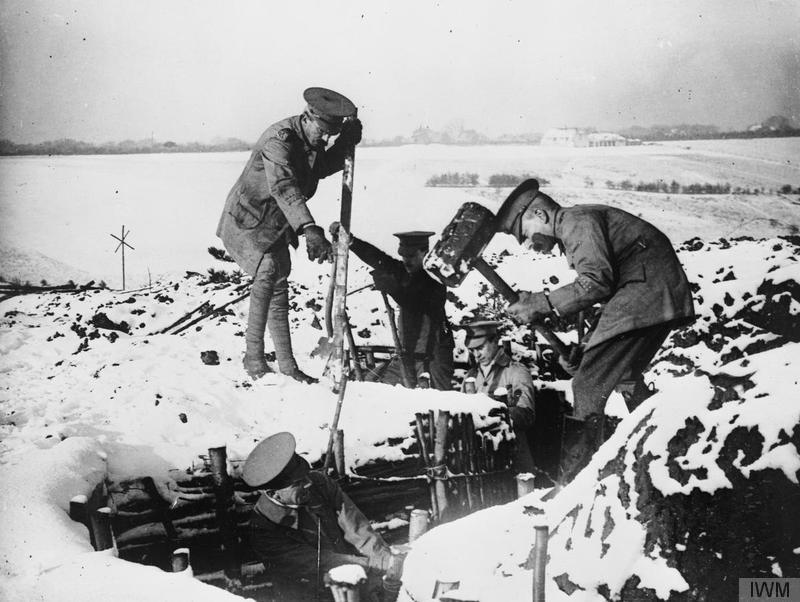
British Army at work, 1914-1918

The railway or Croydon and East Grinstead line was opened in 1884 including a station then named Marden Park (as it was in Godstone parish then), and a tunnel was built to take the line under the high wolds (or rolling uplands) that make up most of the village.

The Garden Village is a former army camp. The bungalow called "Funny Neuk" was home to the Czechoslovak military intelligence radio station from 1940 to 1942, and was used for communications concerning the assassination of Reinhard Heydrich. In 1942 the radio station moved to Hockliffe, near Dunstable in Bedfordshire.

On Friday 25 May 1951, Donald Duart Maclean, Soviet spy and then resident of nearby Tatsfield, is said to have left from Woldingham station on the night of his escape to the coast and defection to Russia.

== Geography ==
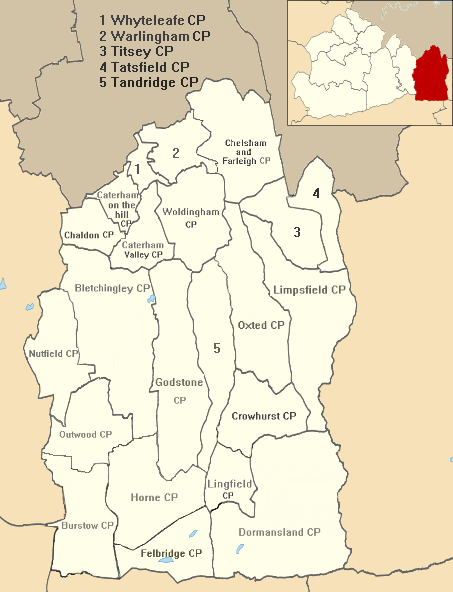
Tandridge civil parishes

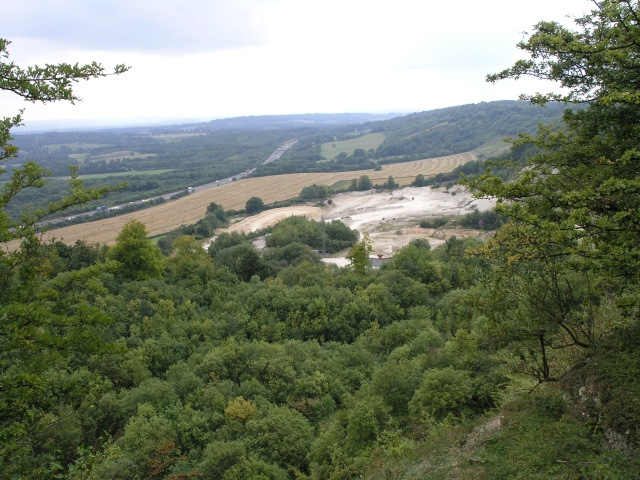
View from the southern edge of Woldingham

Woldingham is a village and civil parish in Surrey; its buildings lie at 150–248m Above Ordnance Datum (AOD) within the M25, 17.5 miles (28.2 km) south-by-southeast of London. Situated high on the North Downs in its Area of Outstanding Natural Beauty between Oxted and Warlingham, a straight line to Oxted measures 2.6 miles (4.2 km) to the southeast, the Tandridge's administrative town.

Woldingham is home to one of the smallest churches in the country – St. Agatha's (it only seats 40 but it served as Parish Church of Woldingham until 1934 and is still in regular use). First mentioned in 1270, St. Agatha's is the county's smallest church with dimensions of 30 ft 3 in by 20 ft 2 in (9.2 by 6.1 m), and at 797 ft (243 m) above sea level is the third highest old parish church in Surrey.

=== Elevations ===
Buildings lie at 150–248m AOD; the lowest point is at the Croydon Road roundabout at the foot of Woldingham Road, which is 106m AOD; the highest point is along The Ridge, a road which is parallel to the North Downs Way, which is 261m AOD and is a continuation of the highest point of the North Downs, Botley Hill, 6 metres (20 ft) higher.

From the nearby areas of high ground vistas of Greater London as far as the Chilterns are afforded, in addition to looking south to the Vale of Holmesdale, Greensand Ridge and woods of the Weald.

An impressive view over Oxted and The Weald from the North Downs Way above the works of lime quarries reflects the geology of the North Downs, with rolling or very gradual north slopes and a steep south slope.

=== Soil and geology ===
Relatively wide bands of chalky soil intersperse the brick-earth topping of the downs, all of which is relatively quick draining making some agriculture challenging. A majority of this Downs-topping soil is free-draining, slightly acid, loamy soil beside this free-draining, lime-rich, loamy soil, i.e. alkaline.

== Demography and housing ==
In 2011, Woldingham over 10 years had seen an increase in housing, yet it had fewer residents than in 2001. In 2001 Woldingham had 2,326 residents in 732 households, of which (Note: For a much greater percentage, compare much of Surrey further from London such as Betchworth) 14.1% were aged over 65; 15.6% of the population were in full-time further education; 78.0% of all men were economically active, whereas 2.7% were unemployed and 4.6% worked part-time; 44.7% of all women were economically active, whereas 2.3% were unemployed and 33.3% worked part-time.

In the 2011 census, for ethnicity Woldingham was White or White British (89.6%), Asian or Asian British (6.1%), Mixed/multiple ethnic groups (2.2%), Black or Black British (1.6%), and Other ethnic group (0.3%). The largest single ethnicity was White British (81.9%). In terms of religious affiliation, residents stated Christian (65.6%) followed by No religion (23.2%), Religion not stated (7.9%), Buddhist (1%), Hindu (1%), Muslim (0.3%), and Other religion (0.3%).

Woldingham's economy is predominantly a service sector economy reflected by one end of the official categorisation table of occupation given, compiled from the 2001 census:

Category	Number of adults in category in 2001	Percentage of those aged 16–74
Lower supervisory and technical occupations	45	2.9%
Semi-routine occupations	63	4.1%
Routine occupations	26	1.7%

32.3% of the working-age population worked in middle or higher professional occupations and 7.6% of the population worked as large employers or in higher management.

2011 Census homes
Output area	Detached	Semi-detached	Terraced	Flats and apartments	Caravans/temporary/mobile homes	Shared between households
(Civil Parish)	524	90	42	81	1	6

The average level of accommodation in the region composed of detached houses was 28%, and the average that was apartments was 22.6%.

2011 Census key statistics
Output area	Population	Households	% Owned outright	% Owned with a loan	Hectares
(Civil Parish)	2,141	744	44.9%	37.9%	1,087

The proportion of households in the civil parish who owned their home outright compares to the regional average of 35.1%. The proportion who owned their home with a loan compares to the regional average of 32.5%. The remaining portion is made up of rented dwellings (plus a negligible percentage of households living rent-free).

=== Comparisons by national media ===
In December 2007, the Sunday Telegraph announced that Woldingham ranked second in its list of the "Top Ten Richest Suburbs in Britain".

== Culture and community ==
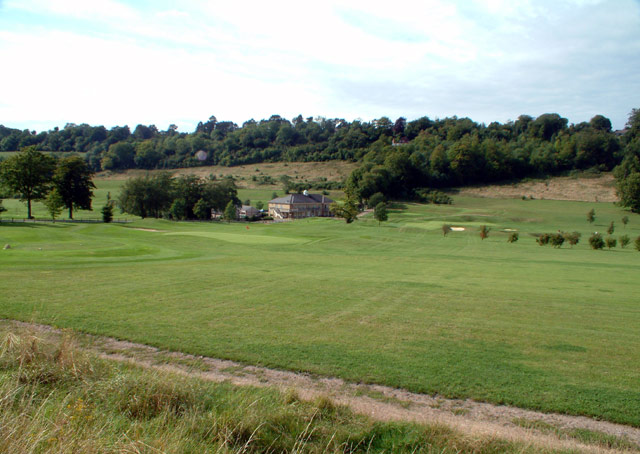
View across Woldingham Golf Club

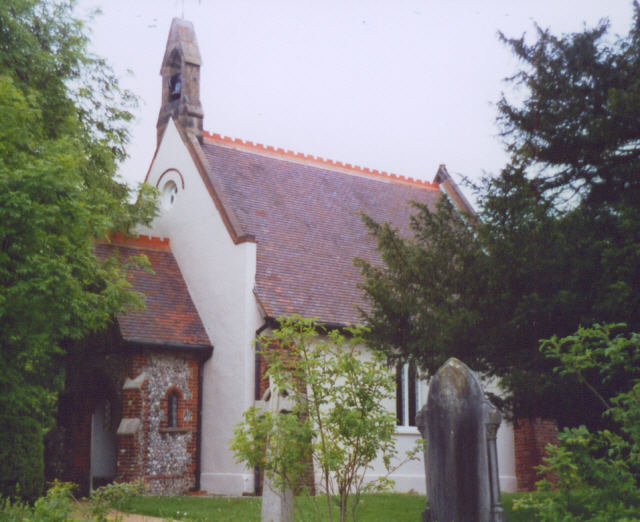
St Agatha's Church, Woldingham

Woldingham Civil Parish operate a village website with events, meetings and information about the facilities offered by the third-tier local council. Its location in Tandridge District is shown above.

Woldingham has a small parade of shops (known as "The Crescent") in the centre of the village next to St Paul's Church, constructed in 1933.

Woldingham has a large recreation ground with tennis courts, Woldingham Golf Club and North Downs Golf Club.

== Education ==
Woldingham School is an independent Catholic school that provides education for girls between the ages of 11 and 18; the architecture of the school building is described above under its old name, Marden Park. The school has extensive grounds in the valley between Woldingham and similarly high, but steeper and narrower, Tillingdown across the railway line. The village also has Woodlea Primary School, which converted to academy status in 2017.

== Transport ==
Rail

Central London is just over thirty minutes by train and the village is served by the Oxted lines that have a franchise currently held exclusively by Southern. During peak hours there are four trains per hour in each direction with northbound services alternating between London Bridge and London Victoria and southbound services terminating at East Grinstead. Outside peak hours there is a half-hourly service northbound to London Victoria and a half-hourly service southbound to East Grinstead. A train journey to Oxted takes 5 minutes and one to Edenbridge (change at Oxted for an Uckfield train) takes 19 minutes.

Road

The main access to the M25 is via the A22 from a large roundabout in the north-west, the Wapses Lodge Roundabout, which is a tripoint between Warlingham, Woldingham and Caterham. This passes over the Tillingdown and cuts through some of its upper slopes to reach the Godstone Hill junction (J6) of the M25 motorway; the village has three exits to its north, one to the east and one to the south.

== Current and former residents ==
- Robert Barr, writer; lived and died in Woldingham.
- Davina McCall, actress and TV presenter; lived in Woldingham.
- Katie Price, aka Jordan, glamour model and TV personality; lived in Woldingham.
- Alfred Robens, Baron Robens of Woldingham, Labour politician
- Nigel Harman, actor (inter alios, Dennis Rickman in EastEnders), 1993–1995; raised in Woldingham.
- Jessie Gilbert, chess player, born in Woldingham.

== See also ==
- HMS Woldingham
- List of places of worship in Tandridge District

== Notes and references ==
Notes

References

- Neil Rees "The Secret History of The Czech Connection – The Czechoslovak Government in Exile in London and Buckinghamshire" compiled by Neil Rees, England, 2005. ISBN 0-9550883-0-5
