= Ernest George Trobridge =

Architect

Ernest George Trobridge (1884–1942) was an architect and developer. He was active in domestic architecture during the first half of the 20th century, especially in what became the North Western suburbs of London.

== Career ==
Trobridge was an adherent of Swedenborgianism and it may have been his religious beliefs which led him to be interested in domestic architecture for working-class people. He undertook his first major building works in the 1920s, when new homes were needed for ex-servicemen. Bricks, the usual building material for housing, were in short supply so Trobridge used elm timber which was readily available at the time, and built inexpensive timber framed, timber clad, thatch-roofed houses in the London suburb of Kingsbury as well as the village of Chaldon in Surrey. These properties were technically highly innovative. The green elm timber was cut in a special way so that shrinkage could be accommodated, and the thatch contained a patent fire extinguishing sprinkler system.

In the thirties bricks became more readily available and the pressure on land around London meant that working-class families needed flats rather than houses. Trobridge developed blocks of flats in the form of romantic cottages, castles and baronial halls, again mostly in Kingsbury. His work often included unusual forms and references to historical building types.

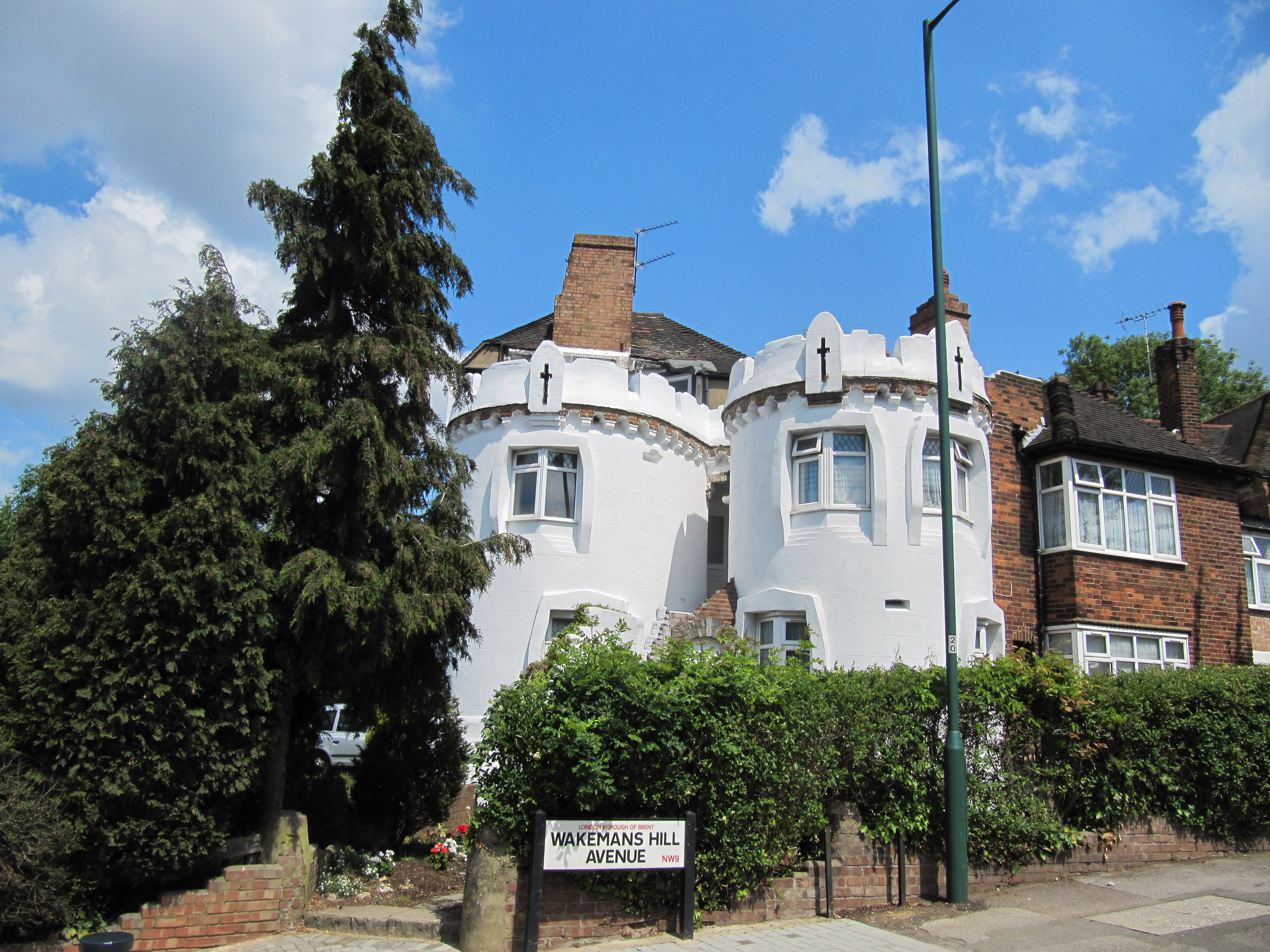
White Castle Mansions, Buck Lane, Kingsbury

Trobridge's working methods were unusual for the time: he employed disabled ex-servicemen and insisted on paying full union rates to all his employees.

== Personal life ==
Trobridge was born in Northern Ireland; his father was the landscape artist and Swedenborg biographer George F. Trobridge (1850–1909).

He married Jennie Pulsford in 1912. They had six children, four of whom survived him.

Because of his Swedenborgian religious beliefs Trobridge was a lifelong vegetarian. He would not take the insulin that he needed for his diabetes and died of this condition in 1942. He lived in a remarkable house at 19 Heather Walk, Edgware, where there is a Blue Plaque bearing his name.

== Trobridge's Legacy ==
Trobridge's legacy includes a large number of unusual homes in the NW suburbs of London and elsewhere in England, including several which are Listed Buildings.

Exhibitions have been held about Trobridge's work in Oxford in 1982, Edinburgh in 1983 and in the London Borough of Brent in 2010.

A Trobridge house in Surrey was in 2016 under threat from a planning application to demolish it.
