= Outwood, Surrey =

Village and parish in Surrey, England

Coordinates: 51.191°N 0.112°W

Outwood
- Village
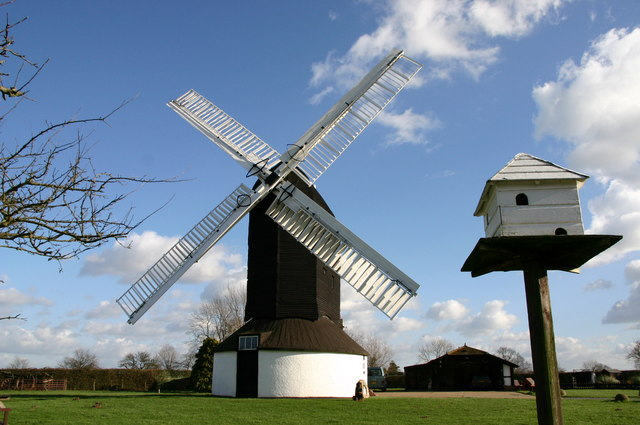
- Outwood Windmill

- Location within Surrey
- Area: 11.09 km^{2} (4.28 sq mi)
- Population: 720 (Civil Parish 2011)
  - Density: 65/km^{2} (170/sq mi)
- OS grid reference: TQ3245
- Civil parish: Outwood
- District: Tandridge
- Shire county: Surrey
- Region: South East
- Country: England
- Sovereign state: United Kingdom
- Post town: REDHILL
- Postcode district: RH1
- Dialling code: 01342
- Police: Surrey
- Fire: Surrey
- Ambulance: South East Coast
- UK Parliament: East Surrey

Outwood is a village and civil parish in the Tandridge district of the Surrey weald.

== Geography ==
Outwood is separated from Redhill by the M23 which forms the western boundary of the parish.

== History ==
The earliest known reference to Outwood is in 1542; the Court Roll refers to the restrictions concerning the felling of timber in Outwood, mostly in the parish of Burstow. The Victoria County History records Abbot's Hospital, Guildford, still owned land in Outwood in 1911.

The Baptist Chapel, no longer in use, was built in 1834. In 1869, St John the Baptist Church was built in what was the north of Burstow parish. This was followed in 1870 by the creation of the ecclesiastical parish of St John the Baptist, taking in parts of Bletchingley, Burstow, Horley, Horne, and Nutfield.

The local school was opened in 1876 and closed in 1981. The building has since been converted into apartments. In 1887, Outwood Cricket Club was formed, and is still active.

Outwood Parish Council was created in 2000.

=== Outwood Mill ===
The village is home to Outwood Mill, a post mill built in 1665, which was once the oldest working post windmill in England. It was damaged in gales in January 2012 and in October 2013. The mill and grounds have been closed to the public ever since, with an application for withdrawal of rights of access applied for. Plans to restore the mill appear to have faltered.

== Amenities ==
In 1939, a village hall was built, called the Lloyd Hall after Theodore LLoyd who donated the land and built the hall. In 2014, the old hall closed for a new hall to be built on the same site. A multi-use games area was established in 2010 when Wells Court was built and opened.

There are three pubs in the village, The Bell, The Castle and the Dog & Duck.

== Demography and housing ==
In 1891 the census recorded 586 residents in Outwood in 140 houses; the populated fluctuated and homes increased over a century. The 2011 census recorded 720 people in 261 households.

2011 Census Homes
Output area	Detached	Semi-detached	Terraced	Flats and apartments	Caravans/temporary/mobile homes	shared between households
(Civil Parish)	155	75	3	7	18	3

The average level of accommodation in the region composed of detached houses was 28%, and the average made up of apartments was 22.6%.

2011 Census Key Statistics
Output area	Population	Households	% Owned outright	% Owned with a loan	hectares
(Civil Parish)	720	261	40.2%	42.5%	1,109

The proportion of households in the civil parish who owned their home outright compares to the regional average of 35.1%; the proportion who owned their home with a loan compares to the regional average of 32.5%. The remaining % is made up of rented dwellings (plus a negligible % of households living rent-free).

== Walking in Outwood ==
There are several miles of public, National Trust footpaths and bridleways as well as Outwood Common. The paths cross open common, woodland and fields, which change through the seasons: much of the countryside in and around Outwood is part of the Harewoods estate, which is owned and managed by the National Trust. There are two main car parks, one is opposite the windmill and the other is on the track leading to the cricket pitch on Outwood Common. The National Trust holds guided walks at certain times of the year.

== See also ==
- Outwood Windmill
