= Chaldon =

Village and parish in Surrey, England

Coordinates: 51°16′50″N 0°06′42″W

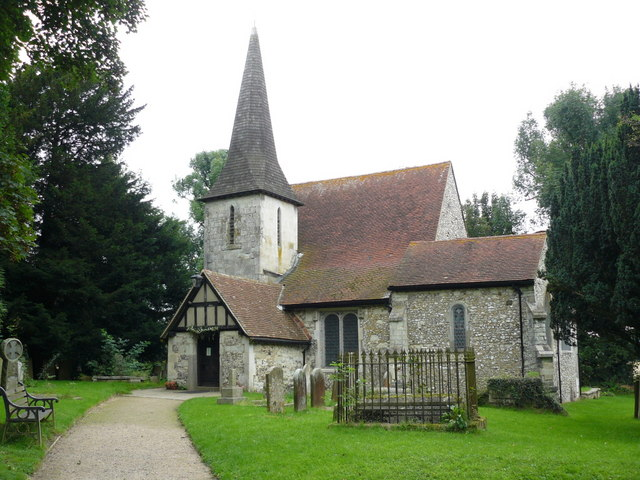
- Church of SS. Peter and Paul

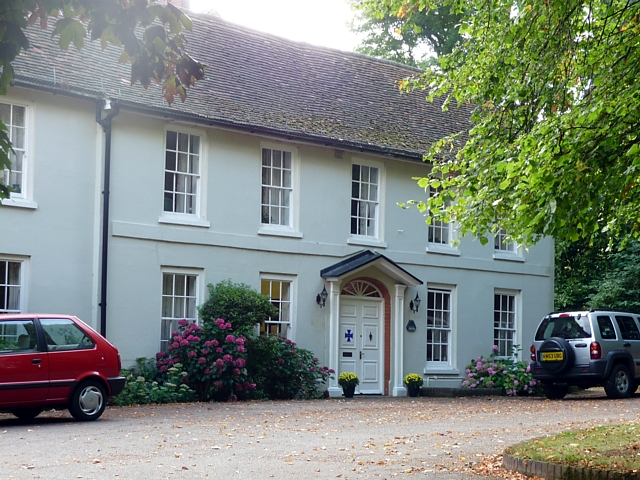
- Glebe House, Chaldon

- Location within Surrey
- Area: 4.72 km^{2} (1.82 sq mi)
- Population: 1,735 (Civil Parish 2011)
  - Density: 368/km^{2} (950/sq mi)
- OS grid reference: TQ 318 552
  - London: 15.8 miles (25.4 km)
- Civil parish: Chaldon
- District: Tandridge
- Shire county: Surrey
- Region: South East
- Country: England
- Sovereign state: United Kingdom
- Post town: CATERHAM
- Postcode district: CR3
- Dialling code: 01883
- Police: Surrey
- Fire: Surrey
- Ambulance: South East Coast
- UK Parliament: East Surrey

Chaldon is a village and civil parish in the Tandridge District of Surrey, England. The village is situated high on the North Downs, immediately west of Caterham and 15.8 miles (25.4 km) south of Charing Cross, the traditional centre of London.

== History ==
=== Etymology and Dark Ages ===
Chalvedune is the first written record of the place in 675 AD, meaning the hill (down) where calves were pastured, in a grant of land to Chertsey Abbey. Prior to this period of human history, White Hill on the borders of Chaldon and Caterham has yielded neolithic flints.

The village lay within the Anglo-Saxon administrative division of Wallington hundred.

=== Middle Ages ===
In the Domesday Book of 1086 the manor of Calvedone appears in Wallington hundred rendering £4 to its lord Ralph Fitz Turold, holding it as was most of the hundred of Bishop Odo of Bayeux. Prior to the Conquest it had been held by the Saxon lord Dernic of King Edward. It consisted of two hides, land for two lord's plough teams and a church. In medieval times the parish included a narrow strip of land below the southern foot of the Downs and a wedge of land to the north of the church that in the 19th century were transferred to Bletchingley and Coulsdon respectively – these are omitted from this article.

An inscribed stone dedicates a pond for use by residents not animals dated to the late 18th or early 19th century, which illustrates the lack of water in the village during summer months. St Catherine's south chancel chapel in the church became devoted to the memory of Christian Hane (d.1752) of an aedicular type with a white stone rectangular panel flanked by Doric pilasters with red marble inlay, swan-neck pediment and crowning shell.

==== Church of St Peter and St Paul ====
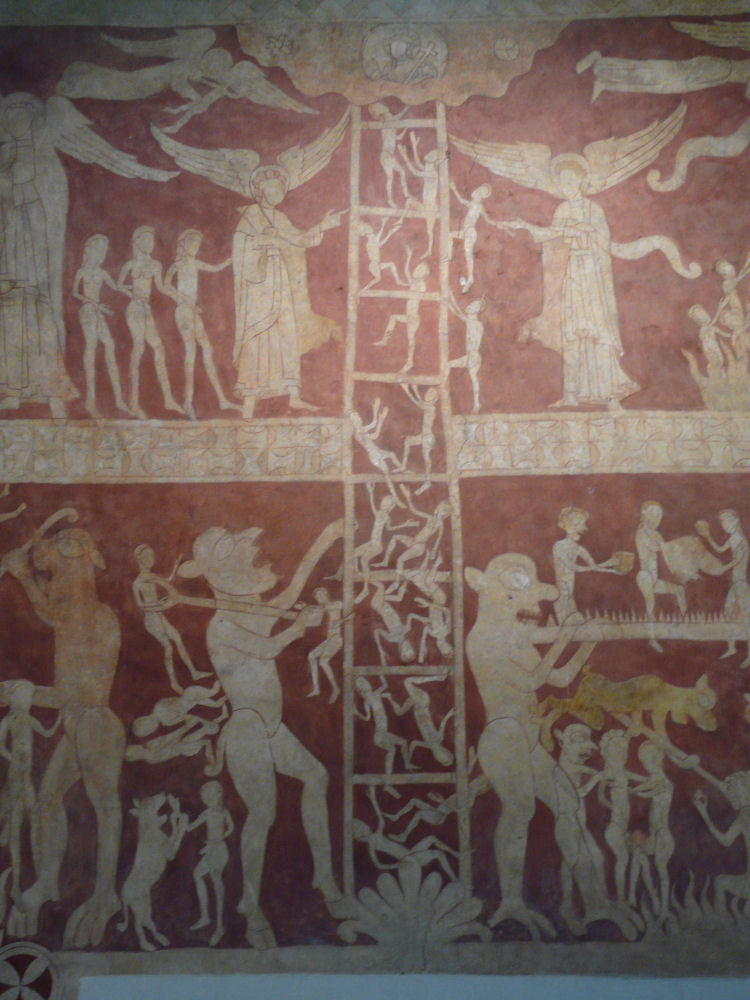
Detail from the 12th-century Doom painting

The Grade I architecturally listed church of Saints Peter and Paul (built before 1086 AD) contains a large wall painting of around 1170 depicting images of the ways of salvation and damnation and their result. (Note: Executed in accordance with a scheme originating in the Eastern church, preserved to us in the 'Guide to Painting of the Greek Church,' as used by the monk-painters of the monasteries of Mount Athos whose title is "The Ladder of the Salvation of the Human Soul and the Road to Heaven")

=== Post industrial revolution ===
Under Rev. James Legrew, the tithes were commuted for £335. 11s 3d, however as rector retaining a glebe of 31 acres, with a glebe house. A tower and spire were added to the church in 1843 from a bellcote before. Given its steep, dry landscape on top of the North Downs Area of Outstanding Natural Beauty, Chaldon did not develop new homes substantially even in the 19th and 20th centuries; though replacements to farmhouses were built in this period.

In 1848 the population was 197 and the population in 1901 was only 266 and it consisted of little more than "the church and six scattered farms". By 1911 Viscount Hylton connected his farms and cottages with the East Surrey Water Company's mains; otherwise the supply depended upon the shallow wells and ponds, filled in a wet season and empty in a dry one.

== Geography ==
=== Elevations, geology and soil ===
Chaldon has received by some locals the epithet "Little Switzerland" because of the microclimate resulting in heavier snowfall here than in other parts of the region when there is snow in Winter. Caterham-on-the-Hill is centred 1.5 miles (2.4 km) ENE of Chaldon and London is 15.8 miles (25.4 km) north.

== Local Government ==
=== Historical ===
The civil parish of Chaldon fell within the Reigate Poor Law Union upon its creation in 1837, subsequently coming under control of Reigate Rural Sanitary District from 1875 and Reigate Rural District from 1894 until its abolition in 1933. Thereafter it became part of the Caterham & Warlingham Urban District until 1 April 1974 when the major local government reorganisation brought Chaldon under the newly formed Tandridge District.

For the purposes of parliamentary elections, Chaldon became part of the Eastern Division of the Surrey county constituency upon its creation in 1832. It moved to the Mid Division in 1867, to the South Eastern Division in 1885, to the Reigate Division in 1918 and to the East Surrey Division in 1948 where it remains to this day.

=== Current authorities ===
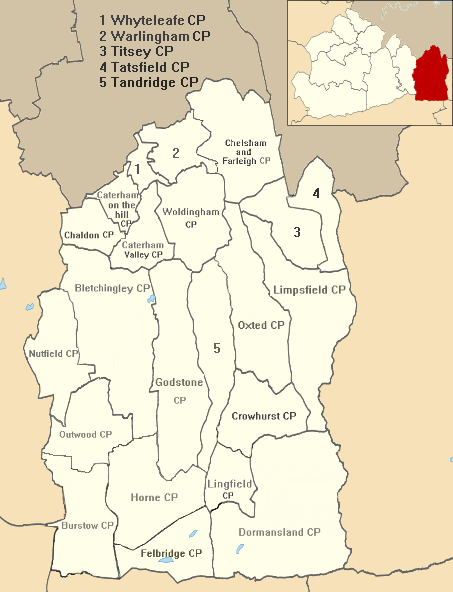
Civil Parishes in Tandridge District

Surrey County Council, headquartered in Kingston, elected every four years, has one representative councillor as follows:

Election	Member	Ward
2017	Chris Botten	"Caterham Hill"; includes in this context only Chaldon.

Chaldon has a representative on Tandridge District Council, headquartered in Oxted:

Election	Member	Ward
2019-2024	Bob Milton	Chaldon
2024-	Lewis Sharp	Chaldon

=== Civil parish ===
Chaldon's residents can participate in the Civil Parish Council with five village councillors and the parish clerk.

== Demography and housing ==
In 2001, there were 1,821 residents in 639 households, of which 18.8% were aged over 65; 4.5% of the population were in full-time further education; 70.9% of all men were economically active whereas 3.2% were unemployed, 5.2% worked part-time; 58.9% of all women were economically active whereas 1.2% were unemployed, 37.7% worked part-time.

As to ethnicity, 97.3% of the population identified themselves as being white, 0.5% as mixed, 1.0% as of Indian descent, and 1.5% as other of the three main categories.

In terms of religion, 80.1% of the population responded as being Christian, 0.6% as Muslim, 2.0% other religions, 11.1% as atheist and 6% declined to answer.

Chaldon's economy is predominantly a service sector economy reflected by the lower end of the official categorisation table of occupation given, compiled from the 2001 census:

Category	Number of adults in category in 2001	Percentage of those aged 16–74
Lower supervisory and technical occupations	39	2.9%
Semi-routine occupations	83	6.2%
Routine occupations	39	2.9%

Whereas in this census, 24% of the population worked in lower managerial and professional occupations and 7.9% in higher professional occupations.

2011 Census Homes
Output area	Detached	Semi-detached	Terraced	Flats and apartments	Caravans/temporary/mobile homes	shared between households
(Civil Parish)	528	78	22	15	1	0

The average level of accommodation in the region composed of detached houses was 28%, the average that was apartments was 22.6%.

2011 Census Key Statistics
Output area	Population	Households	% Owned outright	% Owned with a loan	hectares
(Civil Parish)	1,735	644	48.9%	44.4%	472

The proportion of households in the civil parish who owned their home outright compares to the regional average of 35.1%. The proportion who owned their home with a loan compares to the regional average of 32.5%. The remaining % is made up of rented dwellings (plus a negligible % of households living rent-free).

== Landmarks ==
Along the north street, Church Lane, is a line of houses ending with the Church Green. Here is a close cluster of five listed buildings including the two most highly ranked listed buildings plus farm outbuildings. This area forms a conservation area. Its booklet with hand-drawn illustrations was produced in 1975, year of European Architectural Heritage. On Roffes Lane at no. 18 and no. 20 are two unusual Arts and Crafts elm timber framed and panelled cottages by the architect Ernest George Trobridge. There was a third at no. 22; however, this was demolished in 2015 and no. 18 is under threat from developers.

=== Church of St Peter and St Paul ===
See above.

=== Chaldon Court ===
This Grade II* listed timber-framed building was built in the 14th century and encased in brick and flint in the 18th century; its door is of the Tudor period. Its large gable ends have a large window housing a third floor; however, its extension at a right-angle has instead two taller storeys, slightly lower in height.

=== Surrey National Golf Course ===
Although almost a plateau, the highest part of Chaldon is White Hill, which overlooks Caterham and southeast London beyond and is occupied by Surrey National Golf Course.
