= Weighing of souls =

Religious motif

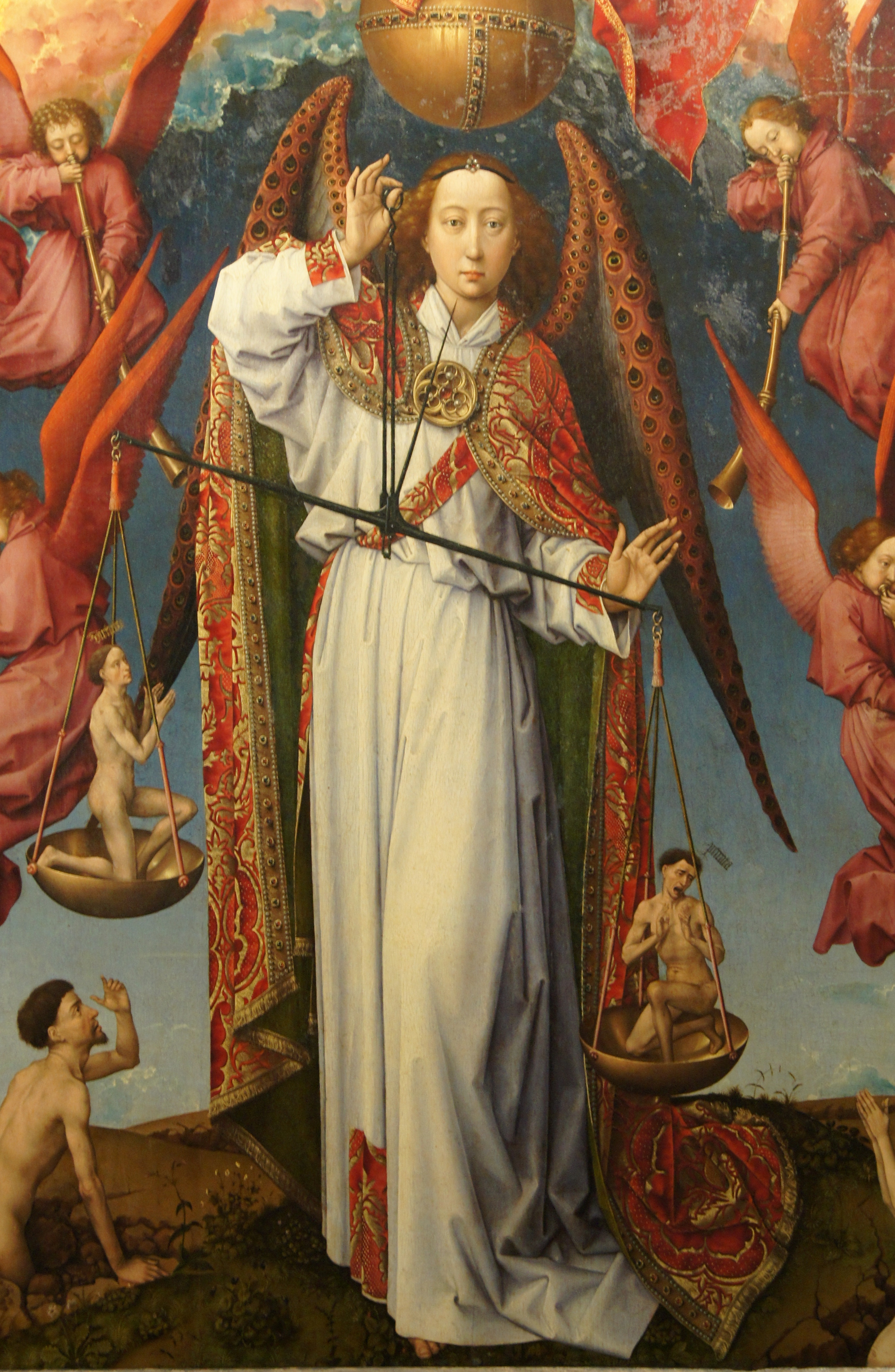
Archangel Michael is commonly depicted holding scales to weigh the souls of people on Judgement Day.

The weighing of souls (Ancient Greek: psychostasia) is a religious motif in which a person's life is assessed by weighing their soul (or some other part of them) immediately before or after death in order to judge their fate. This motif is seen in medieval Christianity and ancient Egyptian mythology.

== Ancient Egyptian religion ==
In Egypt, this concept of a judgement after life to determine the fate of the living is first seen in the Old Kingdom around 2800 B.C.E. It was first imagined as a weighing in the Coffin Texts during the Middle Kingdom (2160–1580 B.C.E.). A well-known form of the ceremony, where people's hearts are weighed on a scale against a feather, is found in the Book of the Dead during the New Kingdom (1580–1090 B.C.E).

The Weighing of the Heart would take place in Duat (the Underworld), in which the dead were judged by Anubis, using a feather, representing Ma'at, the goddess of truth and justice responsible for maintaining order in the universe. The heart was the seat of the life-spirit (ka). Hearts heavier than the feather of Ma'at were rejected and eaten by Ammit, the Devourer of Souls.

== Among the Greeks ==
Later, during the contest of Achilles and Hector in the Iliad, Zeus, weary from the battle, hung up his golden scales and in them set twin Keres, "two fateful portions of death"; this, then, is known as the kerostasia. Plutarch reports that Aeschylus wrote a play with the title Psychostasia, in which the combatants were Achilles and Memnon. This tradition was maintained among the vase painters. An early representation is found on a black-figure lekythos in the British Museum; she observes "The Keres or ψυχαί are represented as miniature men; it is the lives rather than the fates that are weighed. So the notion shifts." In a psychostasia on an Athenian red-figure vase of about 460 BCE at the Louvre, the fates of Achilles and Memnon are in the balance held by Hermes. Among later Greek writers the psychostasia was the prerogative of Minos, judge of the newly deceased in Hades.

== Christianity ==
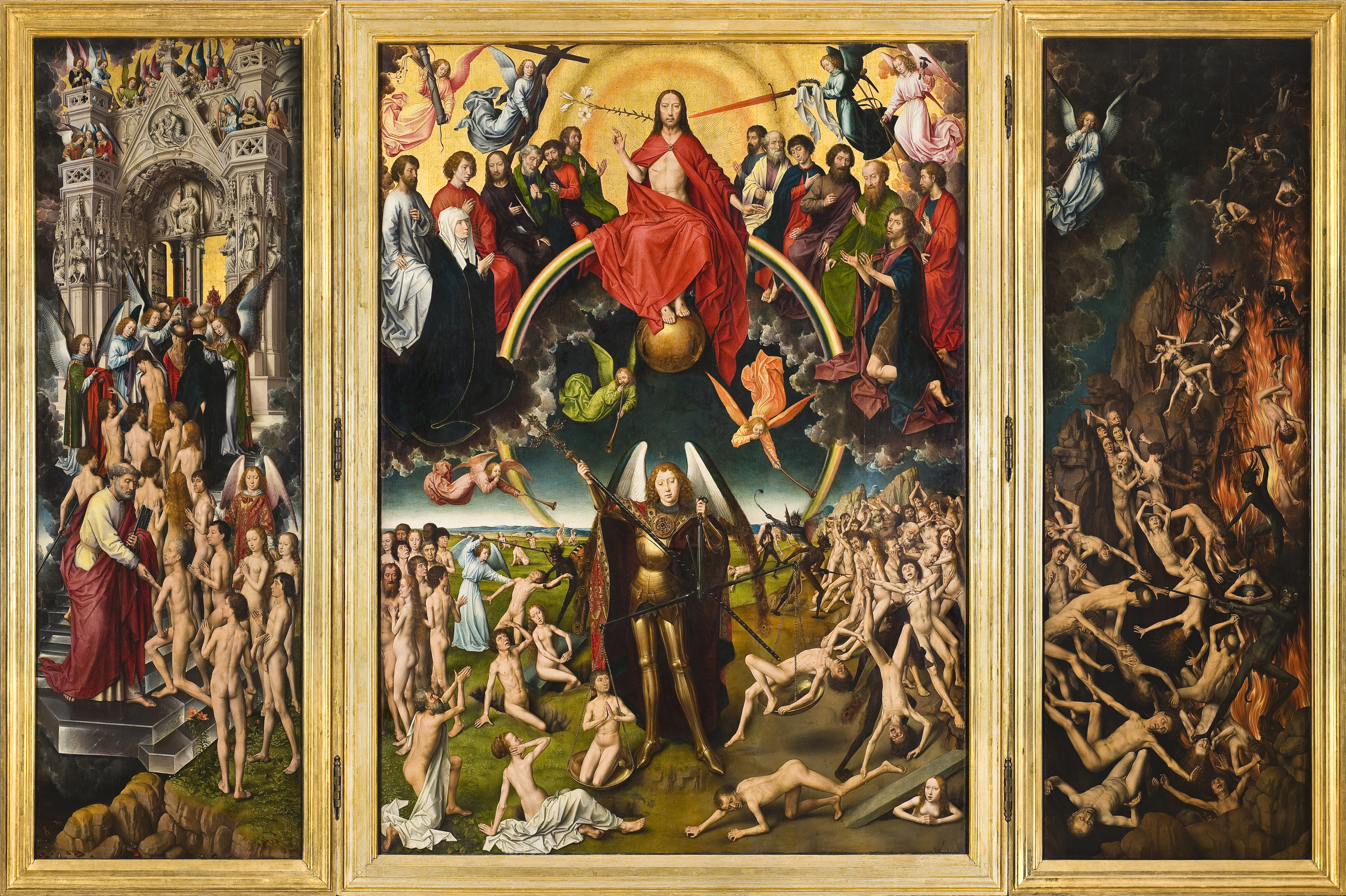
The Last Judgment (1470), Archangel Michael separating the just from the damned while the devil tries to snatch them away.

The first known depiction of literal weighing of souls in Christianity is from the 2nd century Testament of Abraham.

Archangel Michael is the one who is most commonly shown weighing the souls of people on scales on Judgement Day. This depiction began to show up in early Christianity, but is not mentioned in the Bible.

Demons are often depicted trying to interfere with the balance of the scales.

== Other ==
In the literature of the Mandaeans, Abatur, an angelic being, has the responsibility of weighing the souls of the deceased to determine their worthiness, using a set of scales.

== See also ==
- Scales of justice (symbol)
- Libra
- Particular judgment
- Punishment of the Grave
