= Horne, Surrey =

Village and parish in Surrey, England

Coordinates: 51.184°N 0.091°W

Horne
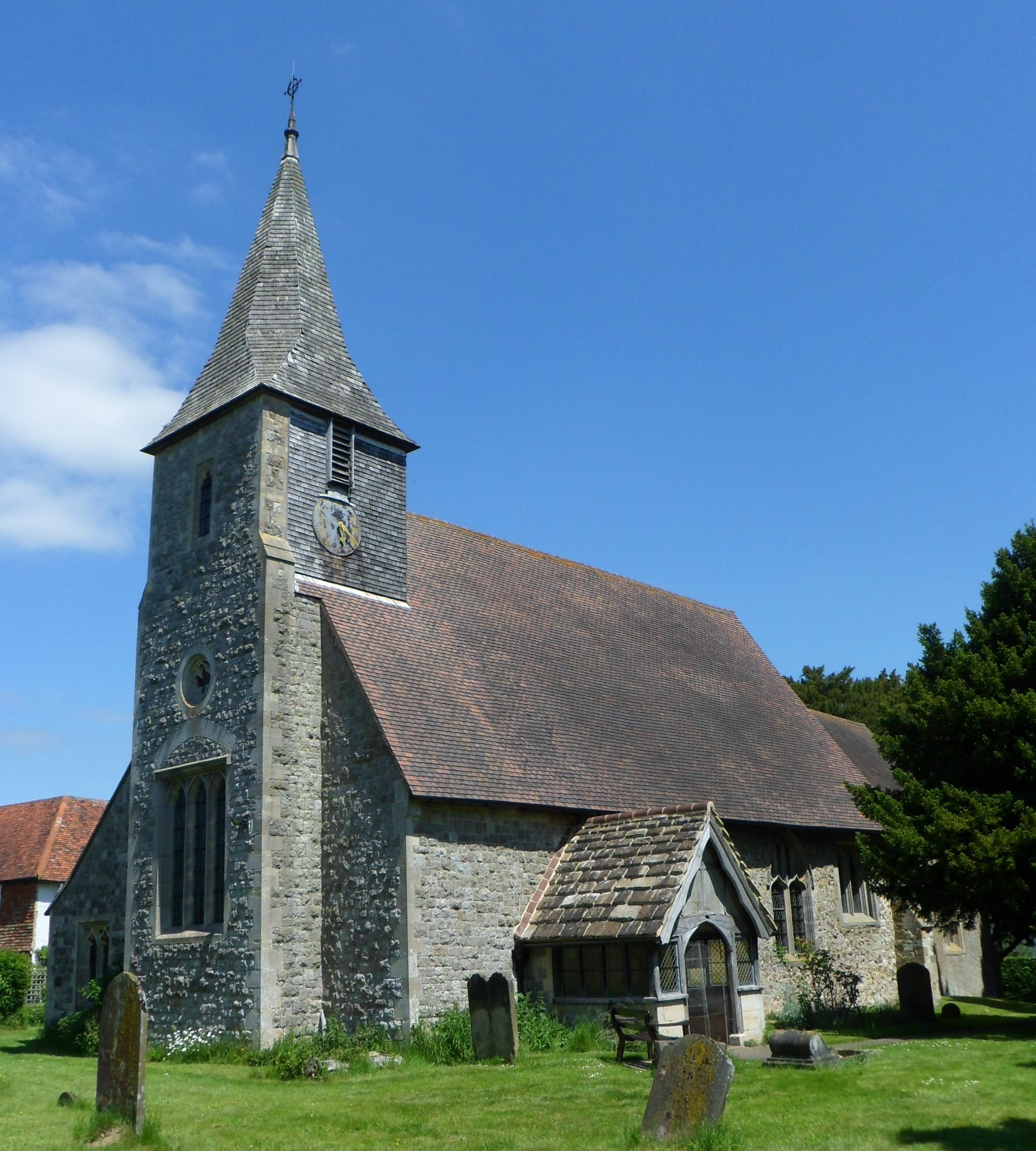
- Church of St Mary the Virgin

- Location within Surrey
- Area: 14.19 km^{2} (5.48 sq mi)
- Population: 941 (2021 census)
  - Density: 66/km^{2} (170/sq mi)
- OS grid reference: TQ3344
- Civil parish: Horne
- District: Tandridge
- Shire county: Surrey
- Region: South East
- Country: England
- Sovereign state: United Kingdom
- Post town: Horley
- Postcode district: RH6
- Dialling code: 01342
- Police: Surrey
- Fire: Surrey
- Ambulance: South East Coast
- UK Parliament: East Surrey

Horne is a rural village and civil parish in the District of Tandridge in Surrey, England. The parish includes the hamlet of Newchapel, where the British Wildlife Centre is situated. Eastern fields forming a narrow part of the parish are split by the A22 road, a main road to East Grinstead.

The civil parish covers 1,419 hectares (3,510 acres) and is centred 4.6 miles (7.4 km) east of Horley, 4.2 miles (6.8 km) west of Lingfield, 8.0 miles (12.9 km) SSW of Oxted, and 22.0 miles (35.4 km) south-east of Kingston upon Thames, and includes the hamlet of Newchapel.

== History ==
A British (Celtic) gold coin has been found in Horne, but is more probably a mark of transit than of settlement. Otherwise there are no prehistoric remains, such as are usually found in other Wealden parishes. Horne must have owed such importance as it had later to the iron industry.

Horne and Bletchingley Parishes Act 1704
- Act of Parliament
- Parliament of Great Britain
- Long title: An Act for severing and disuniting the Church or Chapel of Horne[b] from the Church of Blechingley,[c] in the County of Surrey.
- Citation: 3 & 4 Ann. c. 28 Pr.
- Territorial extent: England and Wales

Dates
- Royal assent: 14 March 1705

Status: Current legislation

The parish lay within the Anglo-Saxon Tandridge Hundred, where the wealthy and powerful would meet periodically at a level below that of the shire to decide on strategic matters, and later for settling disputes in the Hundred Court. The earliest reference to Horne by name was in the 12th century. Horne had a chapelry and manor but did not become a parish until a private act of Parliament, the Horne and Bletchingley Parishes Act 1704 (3 & 4 Ann. c. 28 Pr.), was passed in 1705, being split from the southernmost part of Bletchingley (parish).

Blechingley and Horne Inclosure Act 1810
- Act of Parliament
- Parliament of the United Kingdom
- Long title: An Act for inclosing Lands in the Parishes of Blechingley and Horne, in the County of Surrey.
- Citation: 50 Geo. 3. c. 13 Pr.
- Territorial extent: United Kingdom

Dates
- Royal assent: 24 March 1810
- Commencement: 24 March 1810 (Note: The Acts of Parliament (Commencement) Act 1793.)

Status: Current legislation

Mr. Stileman, who was instituted parson in 1728, bought a house near the church. This was afterwards bought by the parish for a workhouse, and continued in use until the Poor Law Amendment Act 1834. Horne Common was inclosed by the Blechingley and Horne Inclosure Act 1810 (50 Geo. 3. c. 13 Pr.) and an order made on 14 April 1813. Jesus College, Cambridge parted with Horne Court Manor in 1891 to allow a parsonage house to be built instead.

In 1953 parish boundaries were changed with the southern part of Horne gaining its own civil parish council, Felbridge, whilst to compensate for this parts of Godstone and Tandridge were added. Although the county council electoral division is named Lingfield, known for its horse racing course, that neighbouring parish has no historic connection to Horne, nor with the others within the division.

== Geography ==
The parish except for its far north, yielding sedimentary ironstone, is on Weald Clay and was until the 16th century forested, rather than interspersed with six woodlands as it is today. Hornecourt Wood by the northern border is a Site of Special Scientific Interest. At the opposite end of the parish, Home Wood also occupies approximately 5% of the land. Elevations vary from 115 metres (377 ft) to 48 metres (157 ft) above sea level and the parish has several sources of the River Eden, Kent.

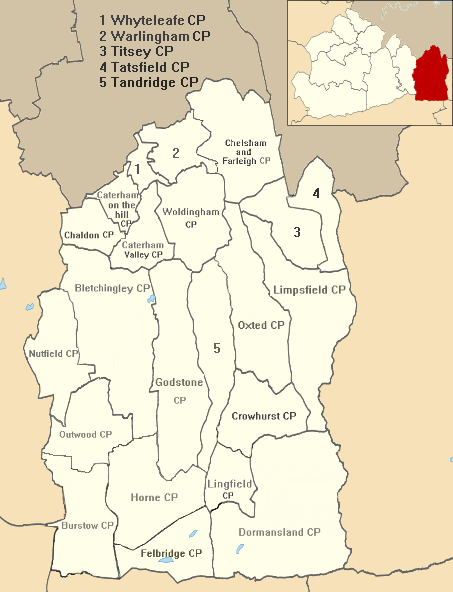
Position within Tandridge

== Demography and housing ==
At the 2021 census, the civil parish had a population of 941 people in 361 households.

Census population of Horne parish
| Census | Population | Female | Male | Households | Source |
|---|---|---|---|---|---|
| 2001 | 805 | 408 | 397 | 328 | |
| 2011 | 811 | 401 | 410 | 324 | |
| 2021 | 941 | 477 | 464 | 361 | |

At the 2011 census, the proportion of households in Horne who owned their home outright was within 4% of the borough and regional average. The proportion who owned their home with a loan was 8% greater than the regional average; providing overall a lower proportion than average of rented residential property and of social housing, and close to the average in Surrey.

2011 census key statistics
| Output area | Population | Households | % Owned outright | % Owned with a loan | hectares |
|---|---|---|---|---|---|
| Horne (CP) | 811 | 324 | 34.6 | 38.0 | 1,419 |

2011 census homes
| Output area | Detached | Semi-detached | Terraced | Flats and apartments | Caravans and temporary or mobile homes | shared between households |
|---|---|---|---|---|---|---|
| (Civil Parish) | 181 | 63 | 13 | 38 | 19 | 10 |

The average level of accommodation in the region composed of detached houses was 28%, the average that was apartments was 22.6%.

== Governance ==
For elections to Tandridge District Council, Horne is within the ward of Burstow, Horne and Outwood, containing three of the four villages of the south-west of Tandridge. The parish borders the extreme south of the two central parishes, Godstone and Limpsfield.

For elections to Surrey County Council, it is in Lingfield electoral division, electing one of the 81 county councillors.

Historically, Horne was in Tandridge Hundred. From 1894 until 1974, it was in Godstone Rural District.

== Landmarks ==
=== Airfield and barrage balloon site ===
A temporary airfield was established to support the Normandy landings in early 1944 on farmland straddling Bones Lane. It was constructed in three months and used for just seven weeks from May to June 1944. Thereafter it served as an anti-V-1 rocket balloon site for a month and was returned to farmland in 1945.

The following units were here at some point:

- No. 130 (Punjab) Squadron RAF
- No. 142 Airfield Headquarters RAF became No. 142 (Fighter) Wing RAF
- No. 303 (Kosciusko) Squadron RAF
- No. 402 Squadron RCAF

=== Church ===
The church in the heart of the village, dedicated to St Mary the Virgin, has 14th- and 15th-century windows. The south door dates from 1250, and there is a 14th-century oak screen and 15th-century chancel beams. Considerable Victorian restoration was undertaken in 1880, which removed most of the building's archaeological interest.

The oldest feature now remaining is the south doorway, which dates from the middle of the 13th century, although this may have been inserted in the walls of a 12th-century nave. A slight inclination of the chancel to the north shows rebuilding of the east end of the church, but the absence of any original detail earlier than a 15th-century rood stair in the west end of the south wall makes the dating of this rebuilding, if it took place, a matter of conjecture.

=== British Wildlife Centre ===
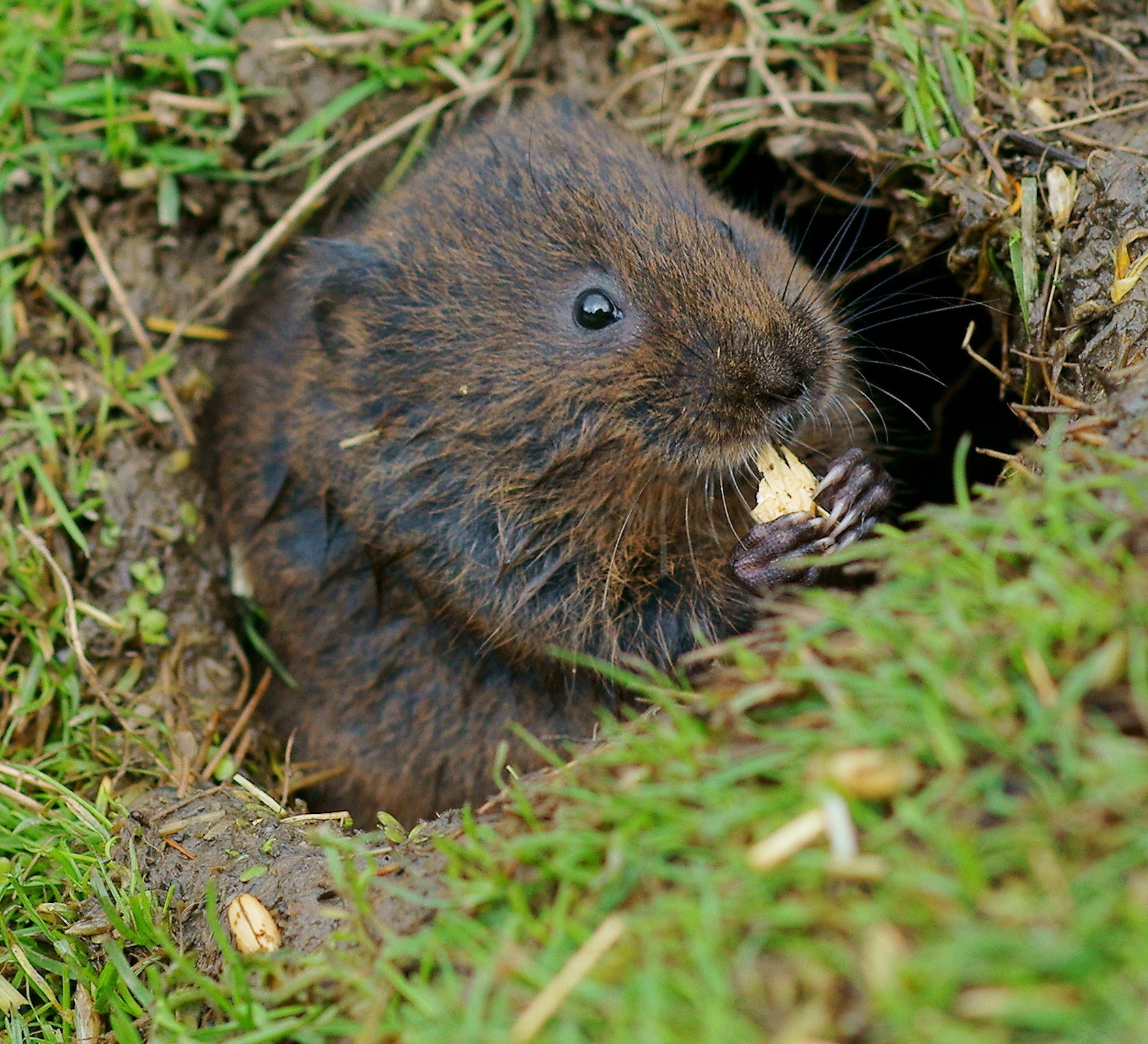
A water vole at the British Wildlife Centre

The British Wildlife Centre lies in the east of the parish, and has a collection of over 40 species of wildlife. The centre, developed on the site of a former dairy farm, opened in 1997, and participates in captive breeding programmes.

== Transport ==
The civil parish has no motorways or railways. Eastern fields are split by the A22 road, a main road to East Grinstead, (Note: Shown green on the map.) which also is used by those closest to the route as opposed to the M23 and main A27 coastal route to access Eastbourne, a large coastal town and the route is a main one for a small portion of East Sussex.

Horne is served by bus services 315 to Redhill and East Surrey Hospital and formerly 236 to Crawley via Gatwick Airport.
