= Tandridge (disambiguation) =

Tandridge may refer to the following places in Surrey, England:

- Tandridge, Surrey, a village in the district of the same name
  - Tandridge District, a district of Surrey
  - Tandridge Hundred, a hundred in what is now Surrey
