= Newchapel, Surrey =

Large hamlet in Surrey, South East England

Coordinates: 51°09′51″N 0°03′04″W

Newchapel
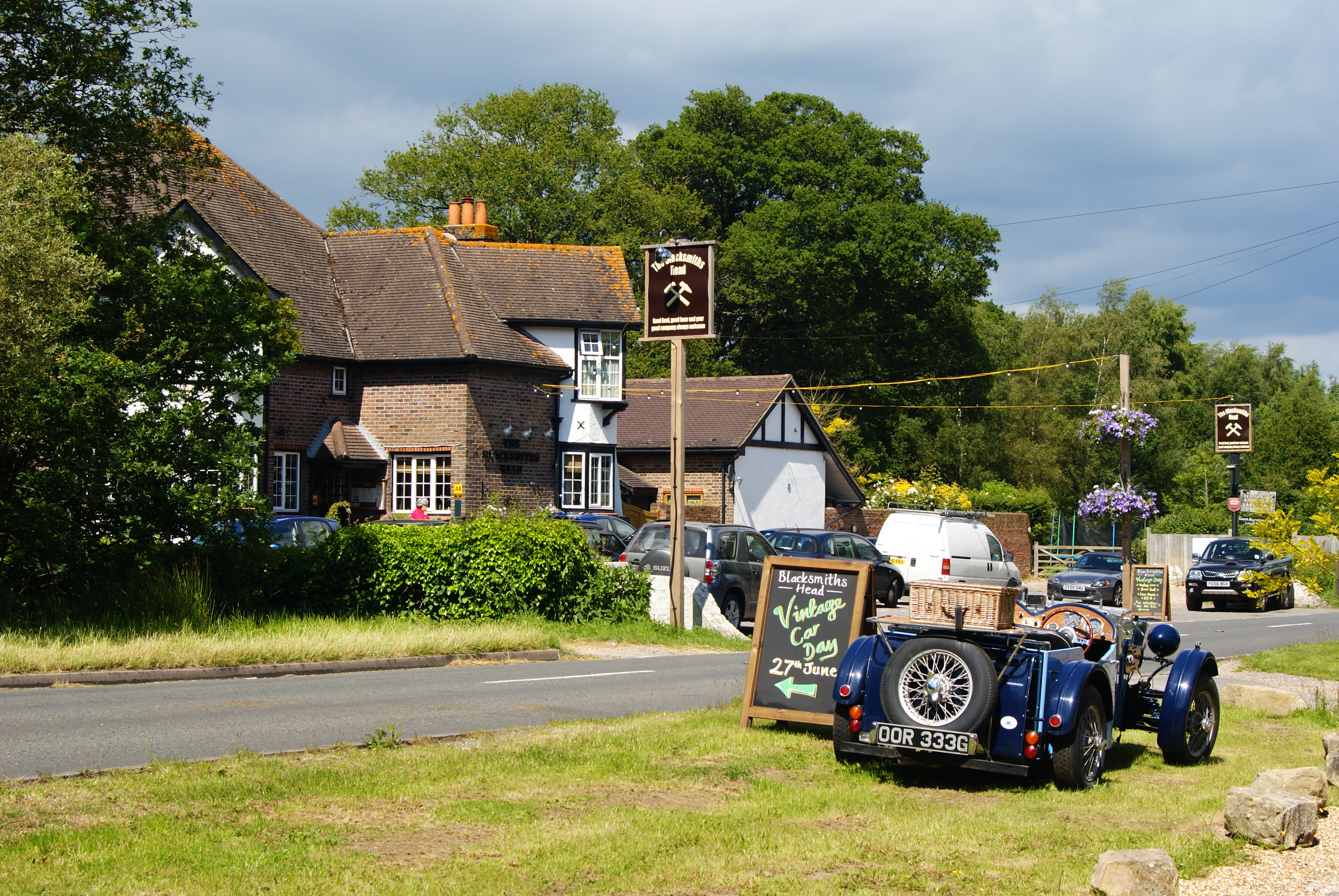
- The Blacksmith's Head public house in the hamlet

- Location within Surrey
- Civil parish: Horne
- District: Tandridge
- Shire county: Surrey
- Region: South East
- Country: England
- Sovereign state: United Kingdom
- Post town: LINGFIELD
- Postcode district: RH7
- Dialling code: 01342
- Police: Surrey
- Fire: Surrey
- Ambulance: South East Coast
- UK Parliament: East Surrey

Newchapel is a large hamlet in Surrey, England, that falls under the civil parish of Horne. It lies on the A22 between Godstone and East Grinstead.

It is the location of the London England Temple of the Church of Jesus Christ of Latter-day Saints (LDS Church). The temple, which was dedicated in 1958, has a visitors' centre and 10 acres (4 ha) of grounds.

The first record of a chapel in the area dates to 1365 when it was granted to Sir Nicholas de Loveyne. A second chapel was built around 1610 on the common, from which the name Newchapel derives. However, both buildings have no standing remains.

The British Wildlife Centre, a zoo and conservation centre for native species, is also located in the hamlet.

The closest villages are Lingfield, Felbridge, Copthorne and Blindley Heath.
