= Edward Taylor (disambiguation) =

Edward Taylor (c. 1642–1729) was a colonial American poet, physician, and pastor.

Edward Taylor may also refer to:

== Arts and entertainment ==
- Edward Taylor (music writer) (1784–1863), English singer, writer on music, and Gresham Professor of Music
- Edward R. Taylor (1838–1911), English artist and educator
- Edward Taylor (scriptwriter) (born 1931), writer of the BBC radio comedy series The Men from the Ministry
- Eddie Taylor (1923–1985), American blues guitarist and singer
- Eddie Taylor Jr. (1972–2019), American blues guitarist and singer (son of above)

== Politics ==
- Edward Robeson Taylor (1838–1923), mayor of San Francisco
- E. Leland Taylor (1885–1948), mayor of Louisville, Kentucky
- Edward T. Taylor (1858–1941), U.S. Representative from Colorado
- Edward L. Taylor Jr. (1869–1938), U.S. Representative from Ohio
- Edward Taylor (MP for Canterbury) (1774–1843), British politician

== Religion ==
- Edward Thompson Taylor (1793–1871), American Methodist clergyman
- Edward Taylor (priest) (1921–1982), Archdeacon of Warwick

== Science ==
- Edward Burnett Taylor (1832–1917), British anthropologist
- Edward Harrison Taylor (1889–1978), American herpetologist
- Edward C. Taylor (1923–2017), American chemist
- Edward Wilfred Taylor (1891–1980), British manufacturer of optical instruments

== Sports ==
- Edward Taylor (rugby union) (1907–1959), Scottish rugby player
- Edward Taylor (cricketer) (1845–1902), English cricketer

== Other ==
- Edward Taylor (Alamo defender) (1812–1836)
- Edward Thornton Taylor (1850–1922), Canadian soldier and amateur athlete
- Edward O. Taylor (1912–1984), American bridge player
- E. P. Taylor (1901–1989), Canadian businessman and creator of the gated community

== See also ==
- Ed Taylor (disambiguation)
- Edmund Taylor (disambiguation)
- Edwin Taylor (disambiguation)
- Ted Taylor (disambiguation)
- Teddy Taylor (disambiguation)
- Edward Burnett Tylor (1832–1917), English anthropologist
