= Tandridge =

Village and parish in Surrey, England

Coordinates: 51.239°N 0.035°W

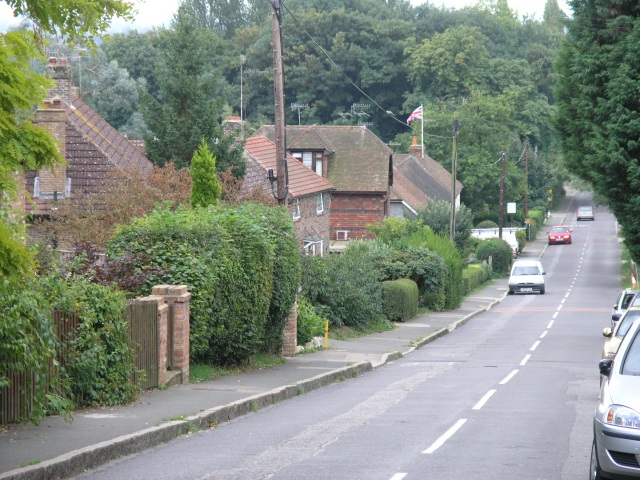
- Tandridge main street

- Location within Surrey
- Area: 10.99 km^{2} (4.24 sq mi)
- Population: 663 (Civil Parish 2011)
  - Density: 60/km^{2} (160/sq mi)
- OS grid reference: TQ372506
- Civil parish: Tandridge
- District: Tandridge
- Shire county: Surrey
- Region: South East
- Country: England
- Sovereign state: United Kingdom
- Post town: Oxted
- Postcode district: RH8
- Dialling code: 01883
- Police: Surrey
- Fire: Surrey
- Ambulance: South East Coast
- UK Parliament: East Surrey

Tandridge is a village and civil parish in the Tandridge District, in the county of Surrey, England. Its nucleus is on a rise of the Greensand Ridge between Oxted and Godstone. It includes, towards its middle one named sub-locality (hamlet), Crowhurst Lane End. In 2011 the parish had a population of 663 and the district had a population of 82,998.

In landmarks it has one of the oldest yew trees in the country, a Grade I-listed church and the tomb of the church's main benefactor Sir George Gilbert Scott's wife, Lady Scott who lived in the parish. The village is acknowledged locally for its friendly atmosphere and sense of community. There is active use of the village hall from the annual Christmas show to many parties and social events. The Village fete and Bonfire events are well attended and add to the sense of village community.

== History ==
=== Middle Ages ===
The village lay within the Anglo-Saxon Tandridge hundred.

Tandridge appears in Domesday Book of 1086 as Tenrige. It was held by the wife of Salie from Richard Fitz Gilbert. Its domesday assets were: 2 hides; 1 mill worth 4s 2d, 14 ploughs, 5 acres (2.0 ha) of meadow, woodland and herbage worth 51 hogs. It rendered £11 per year to its feudal overlords.

Variant spellings such as in feet of fines (levied by the Crown and other overlords whenever rights or lands of manors were in a significant way parted with) include Tenrige; Tanerig, Tanerigge, Tanrich, Tenrig and Tenrugge in the Middle Ages. Godstone until the 19th century cut off a detached part, Tillingdon, which lay between Godstone and Caterham and became part of the latter community.

Tandridge Priory

This small house of Austin canons was founded, Tandridge Priory in the time of Richard I of England. At Henry VIII's dissolution of the monasteries it had possessions valued at £86. 7. 6. per annum. In the grounds of the priory are the lids of two stone coffins dug up here. In 1828 some silver and copper coins of Julius Caesar and other Roman emperors were found. Until about 1610 the property was held as part of the manor, but has since been owned separately.

=== Manorial descent (reversion) and rebuilding ===
Gilbert de Clare died in 1314 which triggered the division of his lands between his sisters and co-heirs: Eleanor wife of Hugh Despenser the Younger succeeded to the knights' fees belonging to (i.e. flowing yearly from) the manor. Tandridge's overlords remained (granting long tenancies of the manor) the Despensers and their descendants, the Beauchamps, thus over a century later, with mass property accumulation by holders of the Earldom of Warwick, it settled on the childhood prize of wealth in the country Anne de Beauchamp, 16th Countess of Warwick. Due to the Cousins' Wars she became widow of Warwick the king-maker and was finally compelled to convey her enormous estates to Henry VII. In 1499 George Puttenham, who was afterwards knighted, was lord of the manor, as which he held courts in 1509 and 1527. He was succeeded at his death by his son Robert, who sold Tandridge in 1542 to John Cooke, a goldsmith of London, whose interest became assigned by mortgage (and default of payment) to Richard Bostock, who died without heirs. The manor became known by the name which it has since borne, Tandridge Court, to distinguish it from the manor of Tandridge Priory which had also become the property of Richard Bostock in the early 17th century. He left it to nephew Bostock Fuller, justice of the peace of Surrey who died in 1626.

William Clayton, nephew and heir to the manor at Bletchingley bought this supplemental manor in 1712 from Francis Fuller, he started a line of Clayton baronets by royal favour and the property was described as sold 'lately' by Sir William Robert Clayton to Walpole Greenwell, in 1912.

Tandridge Court was rebuilt in the 20th century and is not a listed building.

Sir Robert Clayton who owned the manor and the Priory granted the latter with Priory Farm (perhaps thus really only the latter) to Robert Graeme, his steward, and his heirs in return for the valuable services rendered by Graeme and because he had relinquished the profession for which he had been educated to become his steward. In 1817 Robert Graeme and Mary his wife conveyed the manor to Charles Hampden-Turner, in whose family it remained in 1912.

=== Industries post-Dissolution ===
In John Rocque's map of 1761 'Woodcock's Hammer' is denoted what was the far south of the parish, near Hedgecourt (in Felbridge), showing that an iron forge stood there or had once done so.

In 1912 the parish was "chiefly agricultural, but there [we]re brick and tile works in it."

== Geography ==
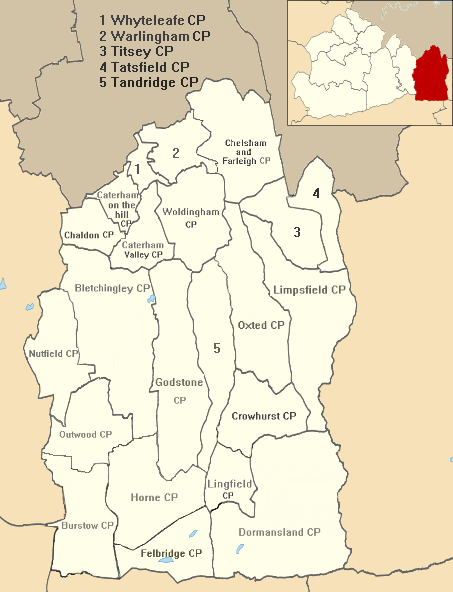
Map showing the position of Tandridge (Civil Parish) in Tandridge

A clustered village partly surrounded by its own steep woodland otherwise by fields, the parish is largely on the lowest land of a noticeable ridge. It stretches as a long, thin parish south of the ridge towards Lingfield and Burstow. The north of this ridge close to the church is Beechwood Hill, at 160 metres above sea level, the 23rd highest hill in the county. The ridge is part of the Greensand Ridge which is patchy in Tandridge, the middle of its extent from the West Sussex/Hampshire border to South-East Kent.

=== Localities ===
Only one named hamlet is within the parish bounds, Crowhurst Lane End, approximately midway between the cluster of almost all of the homes of villagers who are not smallholders or large-scale farmers, and the centre of Crowhurst, Surrey. A footpath connects the village to the latter village and it is served by the local roads.

== Landmarks ==
=== Yew tree ===
In the churchyard of Tandridge church is an ancient yew tree, of a size to indicate it is over 1,500 years old. It was measured as 32.5 feet (9.9 m) in 1912, quite hollow but "full of life with four great limbs above about four feet in height".

=== Church ===
St. Peter's Church, although surrounded by trees, occupies an elevated and prominent position in the parish. The nave is much of the late 11th century, with a wall and carved priest's door in the north of the chancel of the same date. The tower and spire form a rare example of timber construction, and one of the earliest of its class in Surrey, dating, in fact, from the end of the 13th or the beginning of the 14th century.

In the churchyard are tombs/headstones/vaults to

- the Lord Chancellor (the 1st Earl of Cottenham) and the rest of his Pepys family of c.1845
- Edward Hawkins, Keeper of Antiquities in the British Museum, 1829
- Sir James Cosmo Melvill KCB, 1861, malacologist
- Lady Scott (née Caroline Oldrid), wife of Sir George Gilbert Scott, R.A., of Rooksnest, Tandridge who restored the church. The monument to this lady, who died in 1872, is an elaborately sculptured tabletomb to the west of the church, of white marble.

== Demography and housing ==
2011 Census Homes
Output area	Detached	Semi-detached	Terraced	Flats and apartments	Caravans/temporary/mobile homes	shared between households
(Civil Parish)	97	93	48	27	0	0

The average level of accommodation in the region composed of detached houses was 28%, the average that was apartments was 22.6%.

2011 Census Key Statistics
Output area	Population	Households	% Owned outright	% Owned with a loan	hectares
(Civil Parish)	663	265	36.2%	40.8%	1,099

The proportion of households in the civil parish who owned their home outright compares to the regional average of 35.1%. The proportion who owned their home with a loan compares to the regional average of 32.5%. The remaining % is made up of rented dwellings (plus a negligible % of households living rent-free).
