= Edmund Taylor =

Edmund Taylor may refer to:

- Edmund Taylor of Oxton, England, who was instrumental in obtaining the Bidston Windmill
- Edmund Taylor (cricketer) (1853–1936), English cricketer
- Edmund Dick Taylor (1804–1891), US political figure and financial advisor
- Edmund H. Taylor Jr. (1830–1923), American politician and distiller from Kentucky
- Edmund Taylor (New Zealand politician) (1855–1927), New Zealand political figure
- Edmund L. Taylor (1860–1934), Canadian political figure
- Edmund Seyfang Taylor (1853–1908), early pioneer of rambling in the UK
- Edmund B. Taylor (1904–1973), U.S. Navy admiral
