= British Wildlife Centre =

Zoo in Newchapel, Surrey

- Interactive map of British Wildlife Centre
- 51.17342°N 0.04902°W
- Date opened: 1997
- Location: Newchapel, Lingfield, Surrey, England
- Land area: approx. 8 ha (20 acres)
- No. of species: about 40
- Memberships: Visit England Quality Assured Visitor Attraction
- Major exhibits: Deer; Foxes; Red Squirrels; Wildcats; Otters; Badgers; Pine martens; Polecats; Voles; Owls
- Owner: David Mills
- Public transit: None
- Website: britishwildlifecentre.co.uk

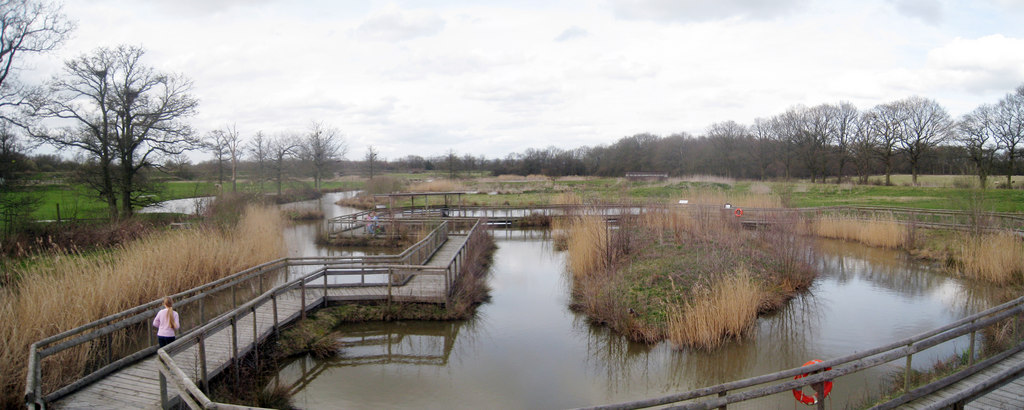
Wetland Boardwalk

The British Wildlife Centre is a zoo in the hamlet of Newchapel near Lingfield, Surrey, England. It was founded in 1997 on the site of a former dairy farm.

== Species and enclosures ==
Approximately 40 species of British wildlife are provided for, most of which with their own enclosures, including:

- red squirrels
- red deer
- roe deer
- red foxes
- weasels
- badgers
- river otters
- hedgehogs
- European water voles
- polecats
- pine martens
- owls
- Scottish wildcats.

== History ==
The British Wildlife Centre was founded in 1997 by David Mills, who converted his dairy farm into a centre to celebrate British wildlife. The first three years served pre-booked groups since which it is opened almost every day of the year to paying daytime visitors.

== Conservation ==
The centre aims to educate and to encourage participation in wildlife conservation. It also participates in captive breeding programmes. Its animals are fed throughout the day, and regular "keeper talks" are held at these times. The talks are at approximately 30-minute intervals, with some of the morning talks being repeated in the afternoon.
