= Teddy Taylor (disambiguation) =

Teddy Taylor may refer to:

- Teddy B. Taylor (born 1953), U.S. diplomat, United States Ambassador to Papua New Guinea
- Teddy Taylor (1937–2017), British politician
- Teddy Taylor (football), college football coach and All-American football player

== See also ==
- Ted Taylor (disambiguation)
- Theodore Taylor (disambiguation)
- Edward Taylor (disambiguation)
- Ed Taylor (disambiguation)
- Edwin Taylor (disambiguation)
