= Ed Taylor =

Ed Taylor may refer to:

- Ed Taylor (American football) (b. 1953), American football player
- Ed Taylor (pitcher) (1877–1912), American baseball pitcher
- Ed Taylor (infielder) (1901–1992), American baseball infielder

== See also ==
- Edward Taylor (disambiguation)
- Edwin Taylor (disambiguation)
- Ted Taylor (disambiguation)
- Teddy Taylor (disambiguation)
