= Ted Taylor =

Ted Taylor may refer to:

- Ted Taylor (physicist) (1925–2004), Theodore Taylor
- Ted Taylor (footballer) (1887–1956), Edward Taylor
- Ted Taylor (ice hockey) (born 1942)
- Ted Taylor (singer) (1934–1987), American R&B and soul singer

== See also ==
- Teddy Taylor (disambiguation)
- Theodore Taylor (disambiguation)
- Edward Taylor (disambiguation)
- Ed Taylor (disambiguation)
- Edwin Taylor (disambiguation)
