= Theodore Taylor =

Theodore Taylor may refer to:

- Theodore Taylor (author) (1921–2006), American author
- Theodore Taylor (politician) (1850–1952), British businessman and Liberal politician
- Ted Taylor (physicist) (1925–2004), American physicist and nuclear weapons designer

== See also ==
- Ted Taylor (disambiguation)
- Teddy Taylor (disambiguation)
