= Edwin Taylor =

Edwin Taylor may refer to:

- Edwin Taylor (British politician) (1905–1973), British master baker and politician from Bolton
- Edwin F. Taylor (born 1931), American physicist
- Edwin J. Taylor (1869–1956), American public servant and politician
- Edwin Taylor (treasurer), colonial treasurer of Hong Kong, 1931–1937
- Edwin W. Taylor, professor of cell and developmental biology

== See also ==
- Ed Taylor (disambiguation)
- Edward Taylor (disambiguation)
- Ted Taylor (disambiguation)
- Teddy Taylor (disambiguation)
