= Edmund Taylor (cricketer) =

English cricketer

Personal information
- Born: 30 December 1853; Bristol
- Died: 25 December 1936 (aged 83); Bristol
- Batting: Right-handed

Domestic team information
- Years: Team
- 1876-1886: Gloucestershire
- Source: Cricinfo, 4 April 2014

Edmund Taylor (30 December 1853 – 25 December 1936) was an English cricketer. He played for Gloucestershire between 1876 and 1886.
