= Edmund Seyfang Taylor =

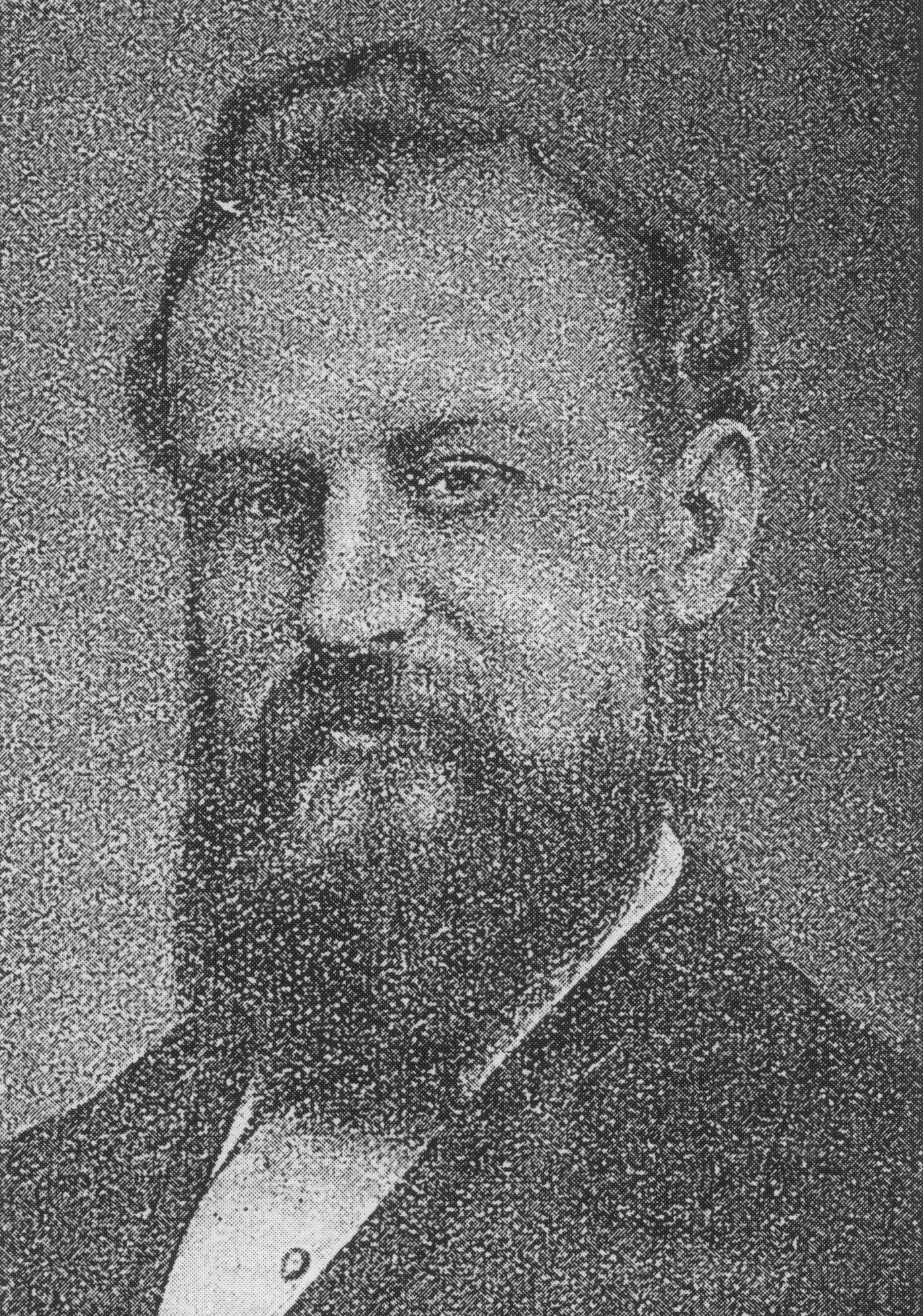
- 'Walker Miles' c. 1900s
- Born: 27 August 1853; Camberwell, London, England
- Died: 19 April 1908 (aged 54); Godstone, Surrey

Edmund Seyfang Taylor (27 August 1853 – 19 April 1908), popularly known as "Walker Miles", was an early pioneer of rambling in the UK. He founded one of the predecessors of the modern-day Ramblers of Great Britain and wrote numerous walking guides.

== Legacy ==
Walker Miles was the founder of the Croydon Rambling Club and was also associated with the Forest Ramblers and the Commons and Footpaths Preservation Society.

In 1905, along with representatives from other London-based clubs, Walker founded the Federation of Rambling Clubs. This proved to be the first of many such organizations around the country which eventually joined to form the National Council of Ramblers Federations. In 1935 this became the Ramblers Association of Great Britain.

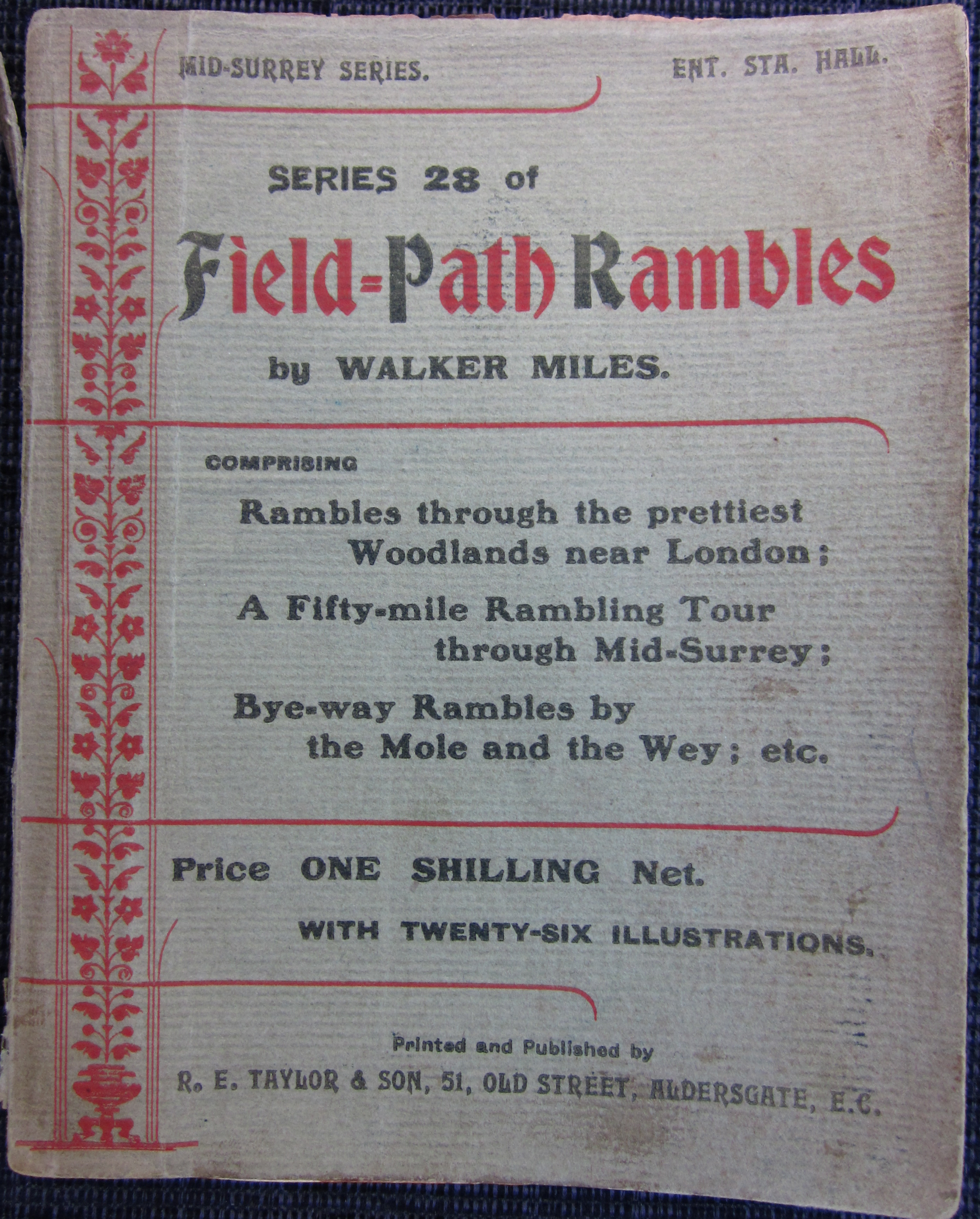
Series 28 of Field-path rambles

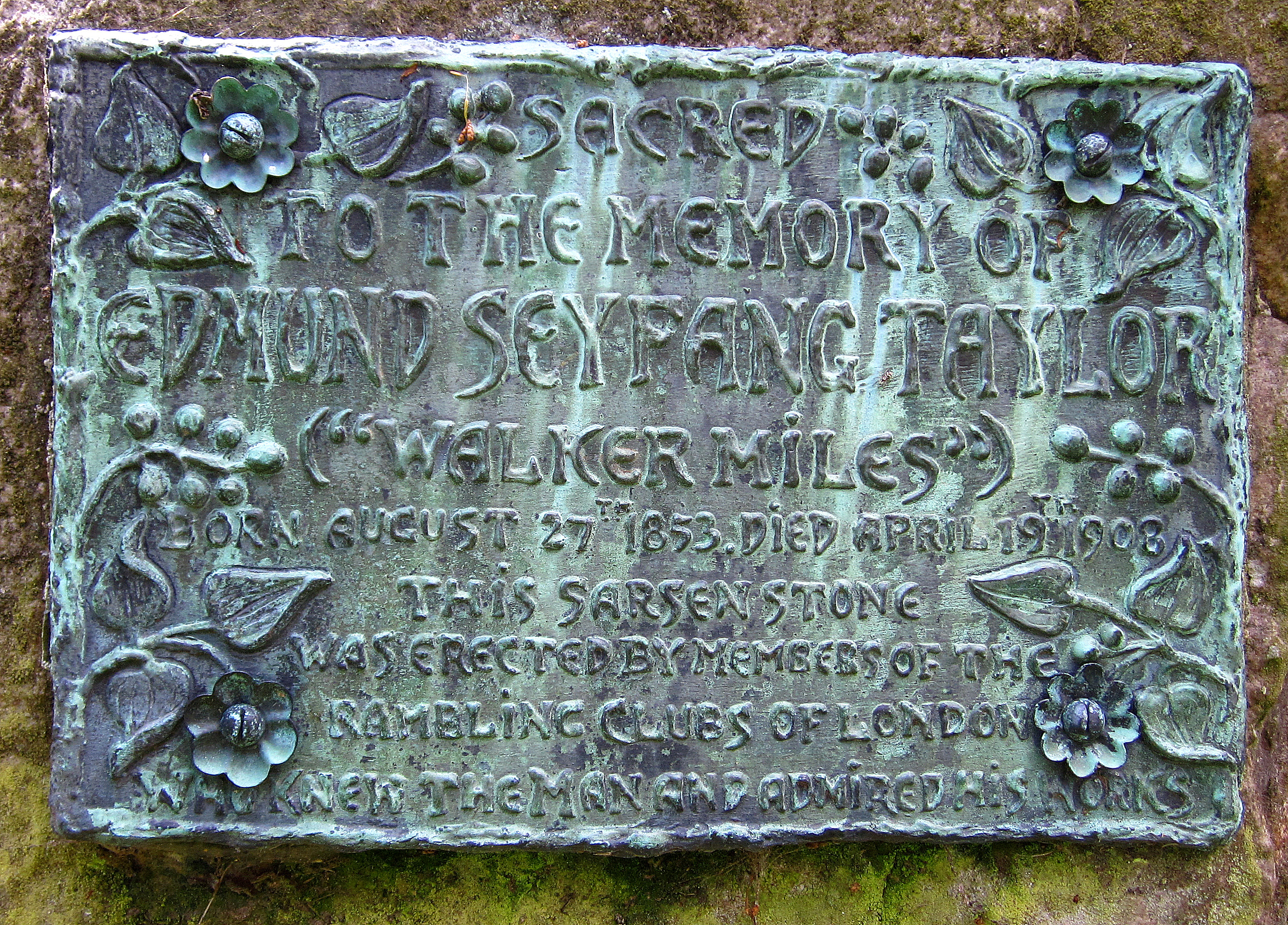
Walker Miles' memorial plaque

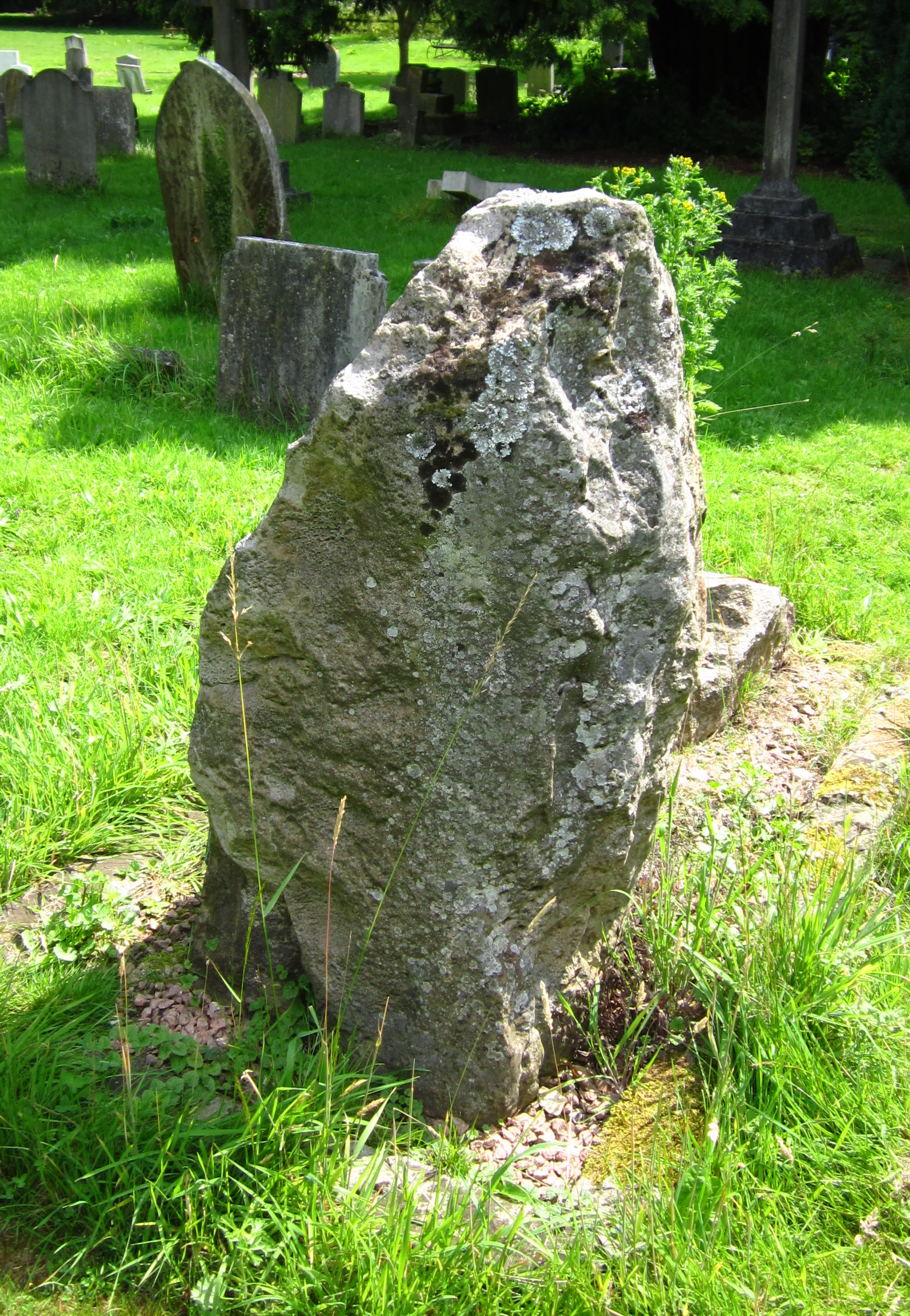
The sarsen stone marking Walker Miles' grave

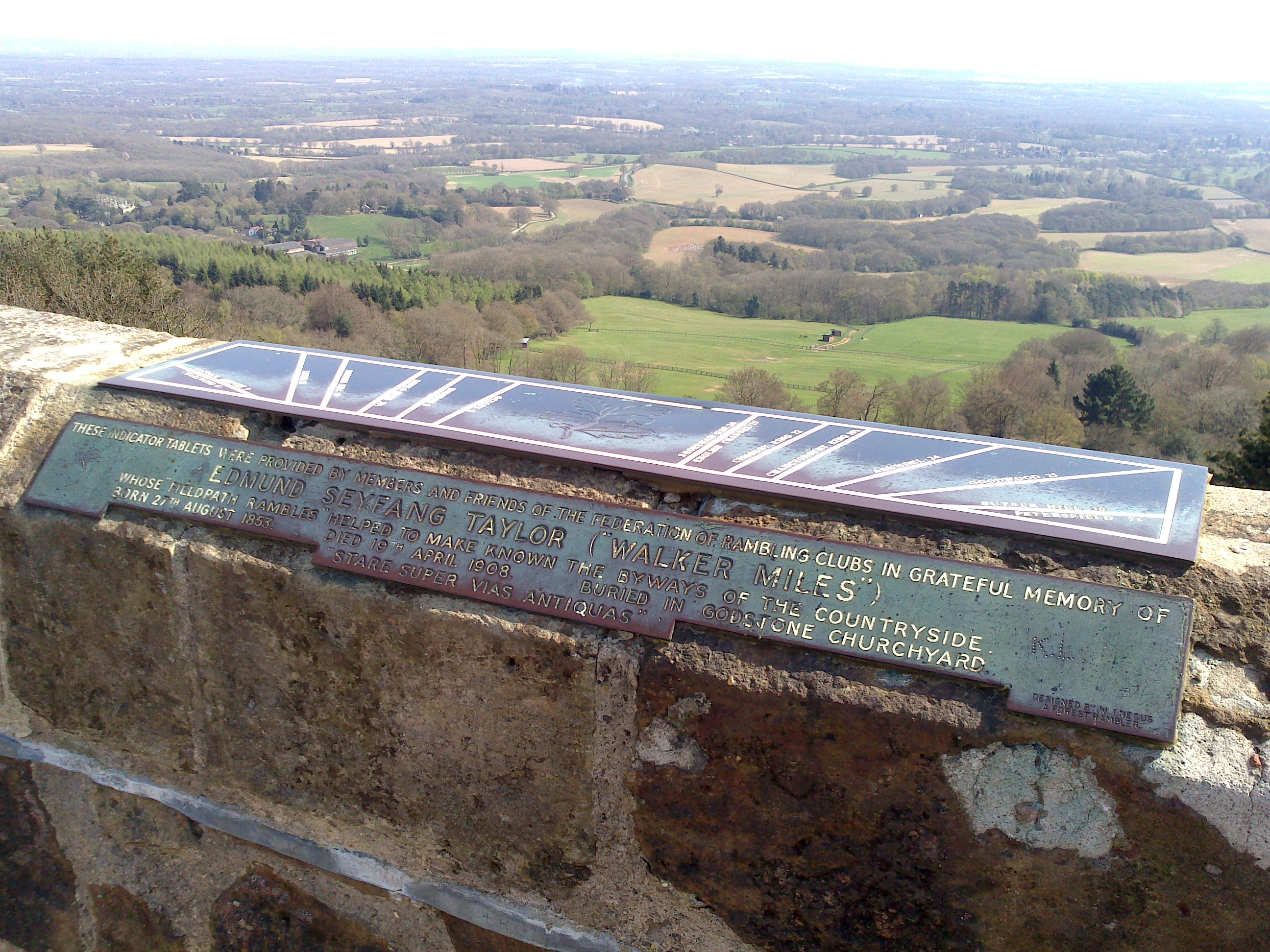
Direction indicator tablets at the top of Leith hill tower.

== Guidebooks ==
Walker wrote 37 pocket-sized books of 'field-path rambles' and published them via his own printing company which he inherited from his father. The pocket-sized guides covered walks in the Surrey and Kent area and were known for their meticulous attention to detail, with each new guide containing several pages of updates and corrections to previous books. They are credited with saving many little-known footpaths and rights of way from falling into disuse and being lost forever.

== Commemoration ==
Walker is buried in the graveyard of St Nicholas' Church, Godstone. His grave is marked with a notable sarsen stone which was erected by the rambling clubs of London. He is also remembered with a viewpoint indicator on top of the Leith Hill Tower, Coldharbour, Surrey.

In April 2008, The Ramblers Association's Surrey Area clubs held a weekend of special walks to mark the centenary of his burial and to commemorate the "father of Surrey rambling". Ramblers Association Vice President David Sharp, who attended the commemoration, outlined the importance of Walker Miles' contribution, saying:

With his amazing series of sixpenny fieldpath guides, Walker Miles showed us the importance of our rights of way. In his day they had no legal status and had virtually been forgotten by a generation. He seems to have been a visionary, sensing how important these fieldpaths would become, as the motor car took over the country lanes. Today we well know how important a part of our heritage they are, and it was Walker Miles who opened our eyes.

— David Sharp, RA Vice President
