= Edward Taylor (cricketer) =

English cricketer

Edward Fairfax Taylor (10 July 1845 – 27 January 1902) was an English first-class cricketer active 1865–67 who played for Surrey. He was born in Holborn; died in Ewell.
