= No. 142 Wing RAF =

No. 142 Wing RAF was a wing of the Royal Air Force operational between 12 May 1944 and 3 August 1945 during the Second World War.

It was previously No. 142 Airfield Headquarters RAF which was operational between 1 January and 12 May 1944.
