= Bletchingley =

Village and parish in Surrey, England

Coordinates: 51.241°N 0.099°W

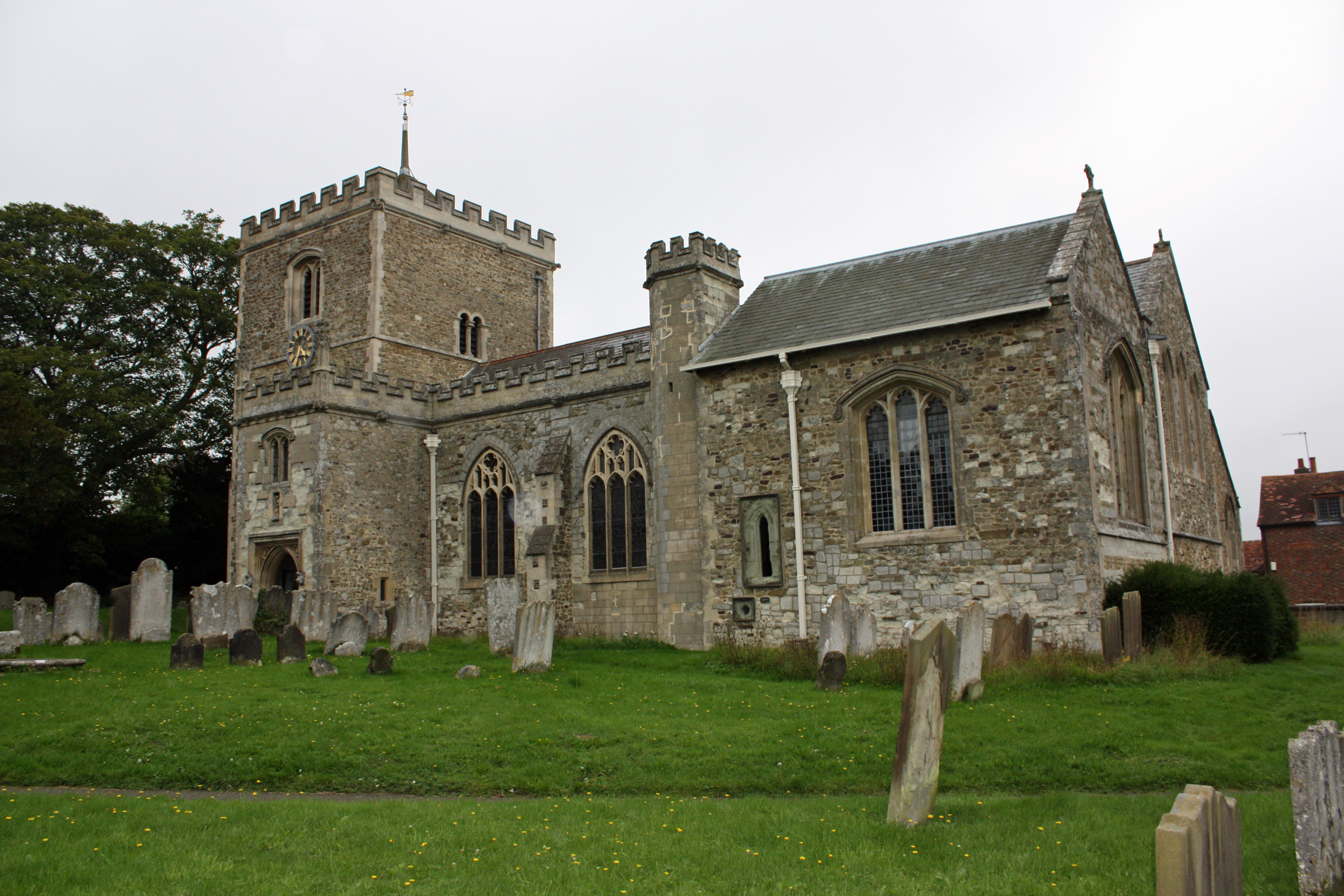
- St Mary the Virgin Church; Grade I listed

- Location within Surrey
- Area: 23.45 km^{2} (9.05 sq mi)
- Population: 2,973 (Civil Parish 2011)
  - Density: 127/km^{2} (330/sq mi)
- OS grid reference: TQ327507
- Civil parish: Bletchingley
- District: Tandridge
- Shire county: Surrey
- Region: South East
- Country: England
- Sovereign state: United Kingdom
- Post town: Redhill
- Postcode district: RH1
- Dialling code: 01883
- Police: Surrey
- Fire: Surrey
- Ambulance: South East Coast
- UK Parliament: East Surrey

Bletchingley (historically "Blechingley") is a village in Surrey, England. It is on the A25 road to the east of Redhill and to the west of Godstone, has a conservation area with medieval buildings and is mostly on a wide escarpment of the Greensand Ridge, which is followed by the Greensand Way.

== History ==
The village lay within the Anglo-Saxon administrative division of Tandridge hundred.

The settlement appears in the Domesday Book of 1086 as Blachingelei. It was held by Richard de Tonebrige. Its Domesday assets were: 3 hides; 14 ploughs, 17 acres (69,000 m^{2}) of meadow, woodland worth 58 hogs. Also 7 houses in London and Southwark. It rendered (in total): £15 13s 4d.

In 1225 there is mention of Bletchingley as a borough. In the Middle Ages a borough was created by either the King or a Lord as a potentially profitable element in the development of their estates.

It appears that after the 14th century Bletchingley began to lose its importance as a borough, perhaps losing out to the market town of Reigate to the west. The village retained its status as a parliamentary borough and elected two members to the unreformed House of Commons. By the time of the Industrial Revolution, it had become a rotten borough. Parliamentary elections were held from 1733 in what is now the White Hart inn: a book in 1844 notes this and that 8 to 10 people voted, as well as a sale of the manor for a very disproportionate sum of £60,000 in 1816.

== Historic buildings ==
The house at Place Farm formed the gatehouse of Bletchingley Place: a great Tudor house, which was given to Anne of Cleves after her marriage to Henry VIII was annulled.

There are nine buildings that date back to the 16th century in the clustered area of the village around its High Street of 90 or so houses.

"Sandhills" was built in 1893 by Mervyn Macartney in free Tudor style, and is protected under UK law with Grade II listing. It is the former home of Geoffrey FitzClarence, 5th Earl of Munster and his wife, Hilary FitzClarence, Countess of Munster, a.k.a. musician Hilary Wilson, founder of the Countess of Munster Musical Trust.

== Amenities ==
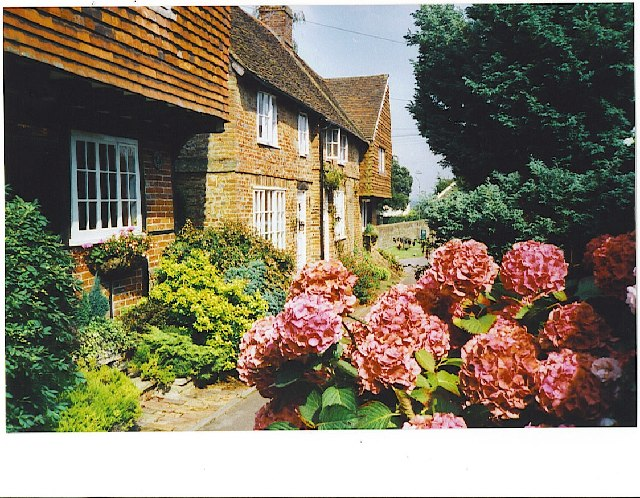
Church Walk

The nearest railway station, Nutfield, is about 2 miles (3 km) away in South Nutfield.

Bletchingley is architecturally and topologically distinct: the central part of the village is a conservation area with several buildings timber-framed from the late Middle Ages and the village is set in a designated area of outstanding natural beauty (AONB). The Greensand Way runs fairly centrally through the parish, immediately south of the main village street which is part of the A25 road.

=== Church ===
St Mary the Virgin Church is just north of the crossroads of the village. Four of the monuments in the churchyard are listed at Grade II, all of them tombs. The reasons for its Grade I listing are:

- 11th-century tower (ironstone rubble with ashlar dressings); north arcade and south chancel chapel 13th century with 15th-century alterations
- North aisle by Rohde Hawkins, 1856
- Renewed upper stage of tower by Baker-King in 1910
- Elaborate/Romantic 19th-century aisle windows
- Perpendicular style windows
- Gargoyles to the angles.
- Three-light head window to chancel chapel associated with Roger the Hermit of Bletchingley
- Stone human head stops to hood moulding of west door
- Renewed south door under 15th-century roll-moulded surround in rich battlemented and crocketed Perpendicular porch.

== Localities in the parish ==
=== Warwick Wold ===
Warwick Wold is a hamlet immediately southeast of the M25/M23 motorway interchange and separated by a green buffer from Bletchingley by Lower Pendell Farm, which holds in one of its fields ruins of a Roman house, Lake Farm and Brewer Street Farm.

=== Pendell House, Pendell Court, and the Old Manor House ===
Pendell House was designed for Richard Glydd by Inigo Jones to a symmetrical plan. On one of the chimney stacks is the date 1636. Glydd died in 1665, and his grandson John, an MP for Blechingley, came into possession. He died without issue in 1689, and his mother and sister Ann Glydd sold the house to Andrew Jelf, who was succeeded by Captain Andrew Jelf, R.N. His daughters sold it to Joseph Seymour Biscoe in 1803 and he sold to John G. W. Perkins in 1811. On the intestate death of his son John Perkins in 1846 it was the share of his sister, who left it to her sister's grandson Jarvis Kenrick, who lived there in 1911. This is a Grade I listed building, the highest category of architectural listing in the country.

Directly opposite the main road is George Holman's 1624-built larger Pendell Court, built of red brick with stone mullioned windows and tiled roof, marble fireplaces and woodwork. It is now used as a private school.

Backing on to the school along the same partly paved street is a 16th-century house, brown-brick clad, timber framed, refronted in those bricks and extended in the 18th century, with Grade II* listing, known as the Manor House. Above this is a stone coped parapet partially obscuring a plain tiled roof with stone coped gables.

=== Brewerstreet or Brewer Street ===
Only 0.6 miles (1.0 km) north of the village, reached by the road at the east end of the churchyard, is Brewerstreet Farm and the old Rectory, parts of which date from the end of the 17th century. (Note: Although H. E. Malden in 1911 says parts of the Old Rectory "appear to date from the end of the 15th century") The house is a two-storey, partly slate-roofed structure that underwent a complete transformation about the middle of the 18th century. In one of the upper rooms is a stone fireplace with a moulded four-centred head and jambs. Grade II listed, the house has three diagonal 17th century chimney stacks to the old left section at the point where it meets the new. In keeping, its central doubled glazed doors has a Doric fluted pilaster (column) surround under flat porch hood.

Brewerstreet Farm is a Grade I listed building house, part 15th century, part Tudor; alterations and extension in 1850; further restoration in the 20th century. Close stud timber framed on a brick plinth with rendered infill, the roof is hipped of Horsham stone, with three symmetrically chimney stacks. A former medieval hall house, it has gabled end cross wings with jettied first floors, curly bargeboards and moulded dragon posts to stairwell corners.

== Demography and housing ==
2011 Census Homes
Output area	Detached	Semi-detached	Terraced	Flats and apartments	Caravans/temporary/mobile homes	shared between households
(Civil Parish)	365	546	190	129	6	0

The average level of accommodation in the region composed of detached houses was 28%, the average that was apartments was 22.6%.

2011 Census Key Statistics
Output area	Population	Households	% Owned outright	% Owned with a loan	hectares
(Civil Parish)	2,973	1,236	30.5%	35.4%	2,345

The proportion of households in the civil parish who owned their home outright compares to the regional average of 35.1%. The proportion who owned their home with a loan compares to the regional average of 32.5%. The remaining % is made up of rented dwellings (plus a negligible % of households living rent-free).

== Governance ==
There is one representative on Surrey County Council, Chris Farr of the Independent group whose extensive ward is called Godstone. There are three representatives on Tandridge District Council:

Member Since	Member	Ward
2007	Gill Black	Bletchingley & Nutfield
2022	Chris Pinard	Bletchingley & Nutfield
2021	Liam Hammond	Bletchingley & Nutfield

There is also a parish council with 9 members.

== Notes and references ==
Notes
