= Tandridge Hundred =

Historical division of Surrey, England

Coordinates: 51.25°N 0.05°W

Tandridge Hundred was a hundred in Surrey, England. It comprised areas in the Tandridge District, the easternmost part of the county, bordering Kent, West Sussex and the 1965-created county of Greater London.

== Composition ==
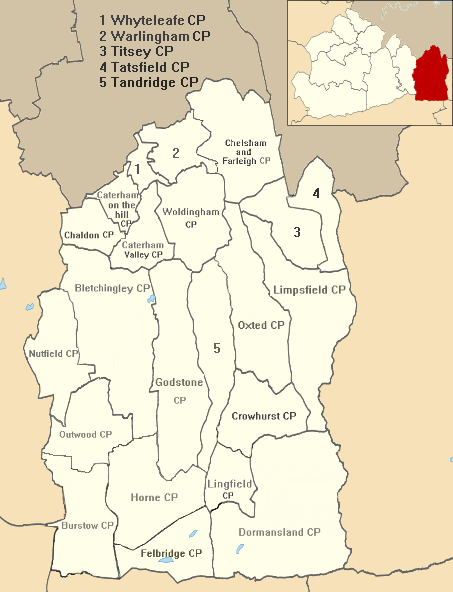
All but Chaldon, Burstow (which included Outwood) and Nutfield of the civil parishes which all otherwise resemble the ancient parishes with minor variations here, were in Tandridge hundred

It included the parishes of Bletchingley, Caterham, Chelsham, Crowhurst, Farleigh, Godstone, Horne, Limpsfield, Lingfield, Oxted, Tandridge, Tatsfield, Titsey, Warlingham and Woldingham which at 1974 formed approximately 90% of the Tandridge District.

The hundred has remained unchanged since the Domesday Book of 1086 where it was called Tenrige. Approximately one sixth of all the serfs in Surrey belonged to the Tandridge hundred before the abolition of that social status across the country in the early Middle Ages.

Custody of the hundred was granted to Thomas Hunt in the reign of James I.

== See also ==
- Medieval Surrey
- Surrey hundreds
