= Tandridge District =

Coordinates: 51.2573°N 0.0000°E

- Non-metropolitan district
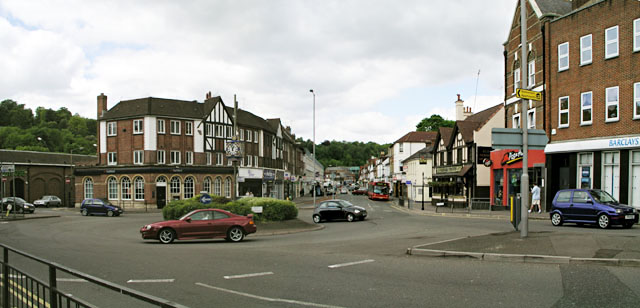
- Caterham, the largest town in Tandridge
- Motto: Concordia (Latin: Harmony)
- Tandridge shown within Surrey
- Sovereign state: United Kingdom
- Constituent country: England
- Region: South East England
- Non-metropolitan county: Surrey
- Status: Non-metropolitan district
- Admin HQ: Oxted
- Incorporated: 1 April 1974

Government
  - Type: Non-metropolitan district council
  - Body: Tandridge District Council
  - Leadership: Alternative - Sec.31
  - MPs: Claire Coutinho

Area
  - Total: 95.8 sq mi (248.2 km^{2})
  - Rank: 134th (of 296) Highest point: Botley Hill

Population (2024)
  - Total: 90,586
  - Rank: 268th (of 296)
  - Density: 945.3/sq mi (365.0/km^{2})

Ethnicity (2021)
  - Ethnic groups: List: 89.4% White; 3.8% Mixed; 3.7% Asian; 2.2% Black; 0.9% other

Religion (2021)
  - Religion: List: 51.2% Christianity; 38.9% no religion; 6.4% not stated; 1.3% Islam; 1.2% Hinduism; 0.4% other; 0.4% Buddhism; 0.2% Judaism; 0.1% Sikhism
- Time zone: UTC0 (GMT)
  - Summer (DST): UTC+1 (BST)
- ONS code: 43UK (ONS); E07000215 (GSS)
- OS grid reference: TQ3954252860

Tandridge is a local government district in east Surrey, England. Its council is based in Oxted, although the largest settlement is Caterham; other notable settlements include Warlingham, Godstone and Lingfield. In mid-2019, the district had an estimated population of 88,129.

Tandridge borders the Borough of Reigate and Banstead to the west, the London Borough of Croydon to the north, the London Borough of Bromley to the north-east, the Sevenoaks District of Kent to the east, the Wealden District of East Sussex to the south-east, the Mid Sussex District of West Sussex to the south and the Borough of Crawley, also in West Sussex, to the south-west.

The district contains parts of the North Downs Area of Outstanding Natural Beauty and the Weald. It also contains several woodlands and some open heathland. Elevations above sea level range from 267 m (876 ft) at Botley Hill, in the North Downs near Oxted, to 42 m (138 ft) near Edenbridge.

== History ==
The district was formed on 1 April 1974 under the Local Government Act 1972. The new district covered the whole area of two former districts, which were both abolished at the same time:

- Caterham and Warlingham Urban District
- Godstone Rural District

The new district was named after the medieval Tandridge Hundred, which had covered a similar area. From the seventeenth century onwards, hundreds gradually declined in importance as administrative divisions, with their functions passing to other bodies such as the county courts. The final administrative functions of hundreds had been extinguished in 1886. The Tandridge hundred was named after the hillside village and ridge of the North Downs, Tandridge.

The vast majority of the district is covered by the Metropolitan Green Belt to prevent extension of the London urban area.

The district is not currently twinned, but one of its towns, Lingfield, is twinned with Plaisance-du-Touch, a commune on the outskirts of Toulouse, France.

As part of upcoming structural changes to local government in England, the district will be abolished in April 2027 and the area will become part of the new unitary authority of East Surrey.

== Governance ==
Tandridge District Council

Type
- Type: Non-metropolitan district

History
- Founded: 1 April 1974

Leadership
- Chair: Deb Shiner, Residents' Alliance since 21 May 2026
- Leader: Catherine Sayer, OLRG since 27 May 2021
- Chief Executive: David Ford since 21 June 2021

Structure
- Seats: 43 councillors
- Political groups: Administration (20) Residents' Association (12) OLRG (8) Other parties (23) Liberal Democrats (12) Conservative (5) Reform (1) Independent (5)

Elections
- First election: 7 June 1973
- Last election: 2 May 2024

Meeting place
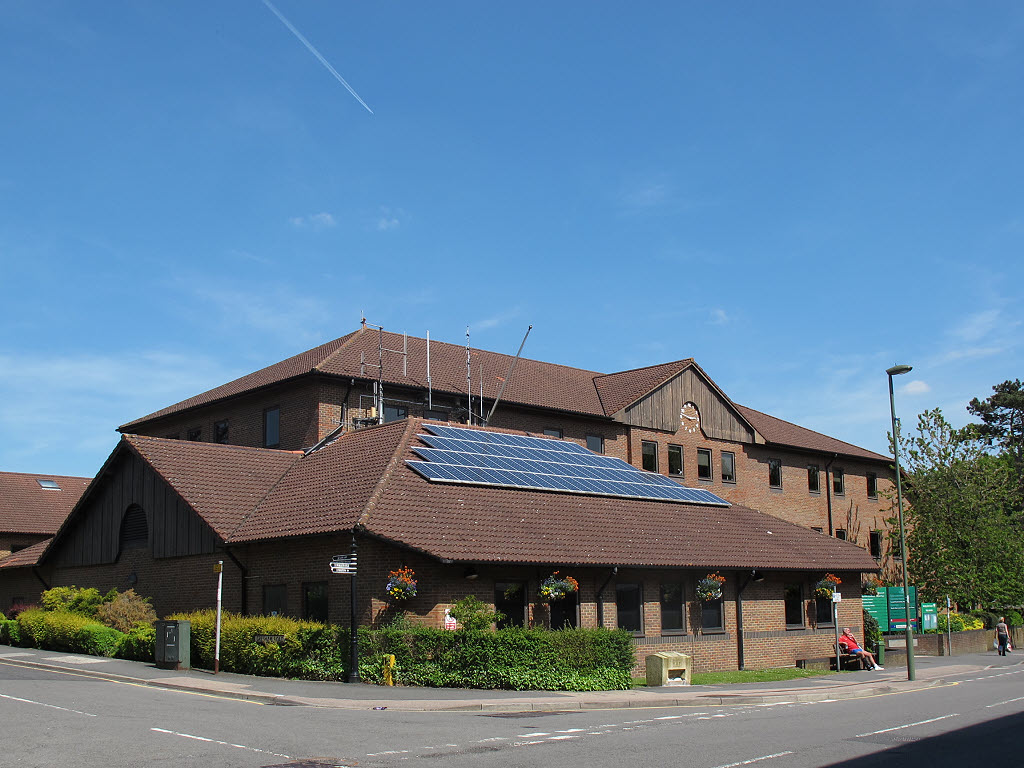
- Council Offices, Station Road East, Oxted, RH8 0BT

Website
- www.tandridge.gov.uk

Tandridge District Council provides district-level services. County-level services are provided by Surrey County Council. The whole district is also covered by civil parishes, which form a third tier of local government.

=== Political control ===
The council has been under no overall control since 2019. It has been led since 2021 by a minority administration comprising local party the Oxted and Limpsfield Residents Group (OLRG) and some of the Residents' Association councillors.

The first election to the council was held in 1973, initially operating as a shadow authority alongside the outgoing authorities until the new arrangements came into effect on 1 April 1974. Political control of the council since 1974 has been as follows:

Party in control	Years
Conservative	1974–1990
No overall control	1990–1994
Conservative	1994–1995
No overall control	1995–2000
Conservative	2000–2019
No overall control	2019–present

=== Leadership ===
The leaders of the council since 2000 have been:

Councillor	Party	From	To
Gordon Keymer	Conservative	May 2000	May 2016
Martin Fisher	Conservative	26 May 2016	May 2019
Tony Elias	Conservative	21 May 2019	May 2021
Catherine Sayer	OLRG	27 May 2021	

=== Composition ===
Following the 2024 election, and subsequent changes up to July 2026 the composition of the council was:

Party	Councillors
Residents	12
OLRG	8
RA total	20
Liberal Democrats	12
Conservative	5
Reform	1
Independent	5
Total	43

The twelve Residents Association councillors sit with the Oxted and Limpsfield Residents Group as the "Residents' Alliance" which forms the council's administration.

=== Premises ===
The council is based at the Council Offices on Station Road East in Oxted (the building is actually in the parish of Limpsfield). The building was purpose-built for the council in 1989 on the site of the old Godstone Rural District Council's headquarters.

=== Elections ===
Since the last boundary changes in 2024, the council has comprised 43 councillors representing 18 wards, with each ward electing one, two or three councillors. Elections were held three years out of every four, with roughly a third of the council elected each time to serve a four-year term. Surrey County Council elections were held in the fourth year of the cycle when there were no district council elections.

Further district council elections were cancelled in 2026, and an election for the new East Surrey Council was held instead. East Surrey Council will formally come into being and take over local government functions in the area on 1 April 2027, at which point Tandridge District Council and the district of Tandridge will be abolished.

== Parishes ==
The entire district is divided into civil parishes. The former Caterham and Warlingham Urban District was an unparished area until 2000, when six parishes were created covering that area: Caterham-on-the-Hill, Caterham Valley, Chaldon, Warlingham, Whyteleafe and Woldingham. None of Tandridge's parish councils are styled as a "town council". The Royal Mail classes Caterham, Godstone, Lingfield, Oxted, Warlingham, and Whytleafe as post towns.

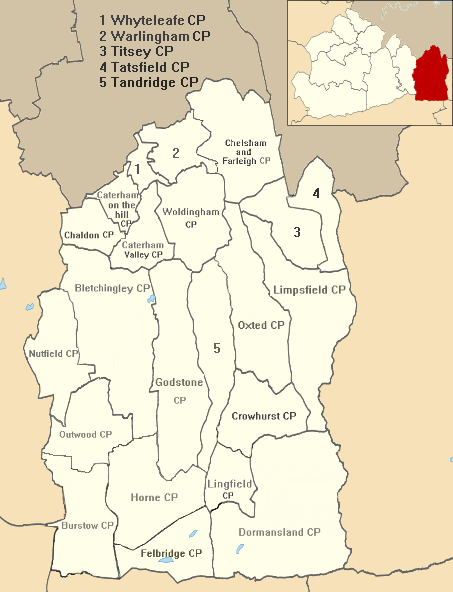

Town, village or neighbourhood	Parish 1	Parish 2
Bletchingley which includes South Park, Brewer Street and Warwick Wold	Bletchingley	
Burstow which includes Smallfield** and Weatherhill	Burstow	
Caterham	Caterham on the Hill	Caterham Valley
Chaldon	Chaldon	
Chelsham	Chelsham and Farleigh	
Crowhurst	Crowhurst	
Dormansland which includes Dormans Park and Haxted	Dormansland	
Farleigh which includes Fickleshole	Chelsham and Farleigh	
Felbridge which includes Domewood	Felbridge	
Godstone which includes South Godstone*, Tyler's Green, Church Town, Tilburstow and Blindley Heath*	Godstone	
Horne which includes Newchapel and Whitewood	Horne	
Limpsfield which includes Limpsfield Chart*, Paines Hill and Langhurst	Limpsfield	
Lingfield which includes Felcourt	Lingfield	
Outwood	Outwood	
Oxted which includes Hurst Green* and Holland	Oxted	
Nutfield which includes South Nutfield* and Ridge Green	Nutfield	
Tandridge which includes Crowhurst Lane End	Tandridge	
Tatsfield	Tatsfield	
Titsey	Titsey	
Warlingham which includes Hamsey Green*	Warlingham	
Whyteleafe	Whyteleafe	
Woldingham which includes Woldingham Garden Village	Woldingham	

Each civil parish is named after one of its towns or villages which has been established around an Anglican church. All other settlements/neighbourhoods with their own Anglican church or chapel and therefore traditionally in England defined as "a village" are marked with an asterisk. A double asterisk indicates the locality has a church hall used as a Church of England church. One chapel in Limpsfield ecclesiastical parish and civil parish has no adjoining settlement, in Staffhurst Wood.

== Arms ==
Coat of arms of Tandridge District
Notes Granted 17 March 1977 Crest Upon a mural crown Or a grasshopper Vert. Escutcheon Gules three bezants each charged with an estoile of eight rays also Gules. Supporters On either side a griffin Or holding a sword erect Proper the quillons formed of a vol Or the pommel Azure. Motto Concordia (Harmony) Badge Four Tau crosses joined in cross at the foot Or.

== See also ==
- List of places of worship in Tandridge (district)
