= Felbridge =

Village and parish in Surrey, England

Coordinates: 51.140°N 0.043°W

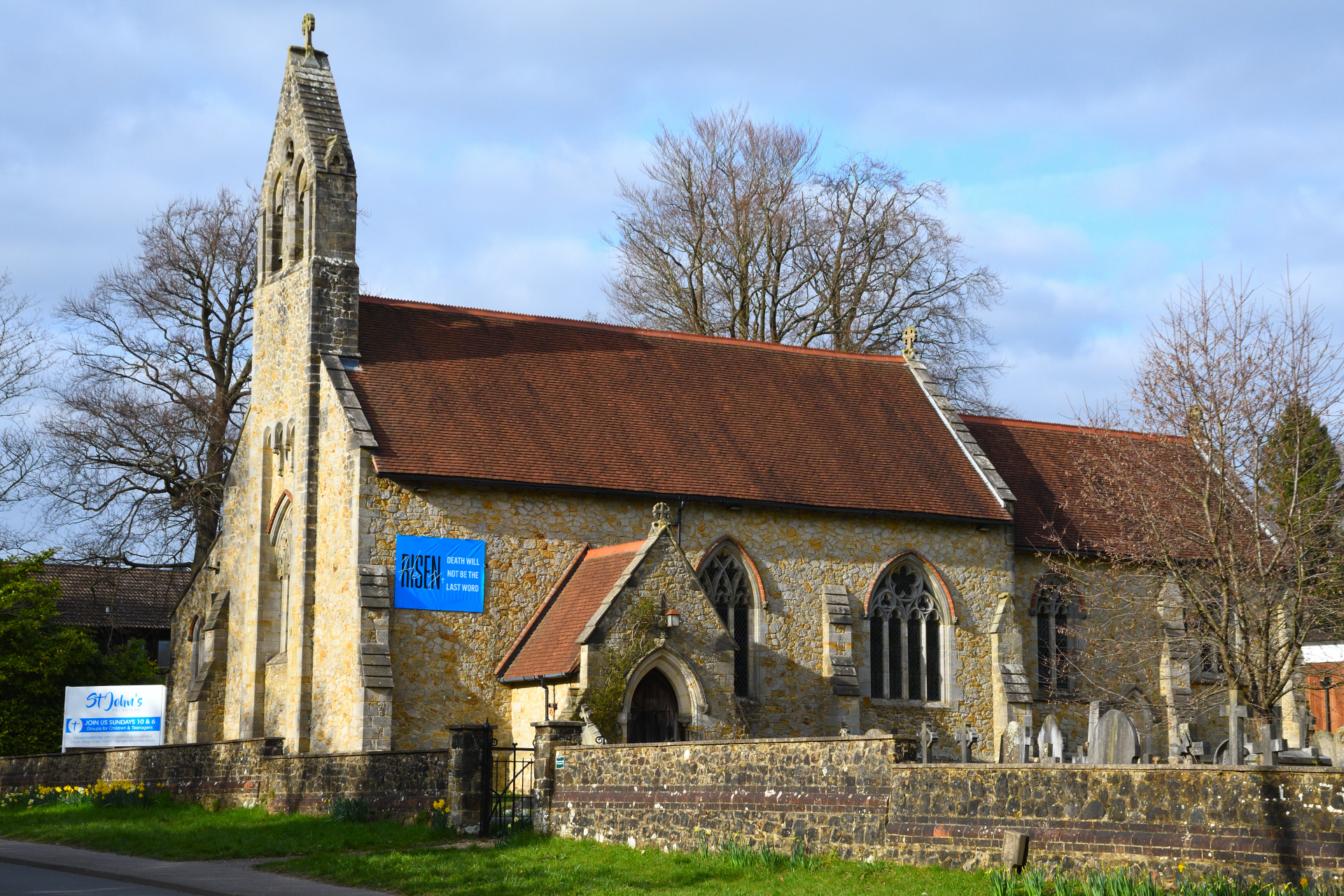
- St John the Divine parish church

- Location within Surrey
- Area: 8.49 km^{2} (3.28 sq mi)
- Population: 2,096 (Civil Parish 2011)
  - Density: 247/km^{2} (640/sq mi)
- OS grid reference: TQ 369263
- Civil parish: Felbridge
- District: Tandridge
- Shire county: Surrey
- Region: South East
- Country: England
- Sovereign state: United Kingdom
- Post town: EAST GRINSTEAD
- Postcode district: RH19
- Dialling code: 01342
- Police: Surrey
- Fire: Surrey
- Ambulance: South East Coast
- UK Parliament: East Surrey

Felbridge is a village and civil parish in the Tandridge district of Surrey with a playing field within its focal area, narrowly in West Sussex. Felbridge village forms a contiguous settlement with East Grinstead and had 829 homes and households at the time of the 2011 census. Domewood is part of Felbridge civil parish, which was created in 1953.

== History ==
=== Early history ===
Until shortly after 1911, the area was part of the parish of Horne. No reference appears to a separate settlement being here in the Domesday Book of 1086.

=== Post Reformation ===
James son of Edward Evelyn succeeded to the manors of Hedgecourt (and smaller carucate of Covelingeley) in the parish of Horne and the estate of Felbridge in 1751. Julia Evelyn Medley, his granddaughter by his first wife, who had married Charles Jenkinson, 3rd Earl of Liverpool held this estate, after James's Evelyn wife's death, as late as 1841.

By 1911, whereabouts it lost much of its land, amid the economic change and social reforms of the age it became the property of the Sayer family. The last resident "lord of the manor" was Charles Henry Gatty FRSE FLS who died in 1903.

== Geography ==
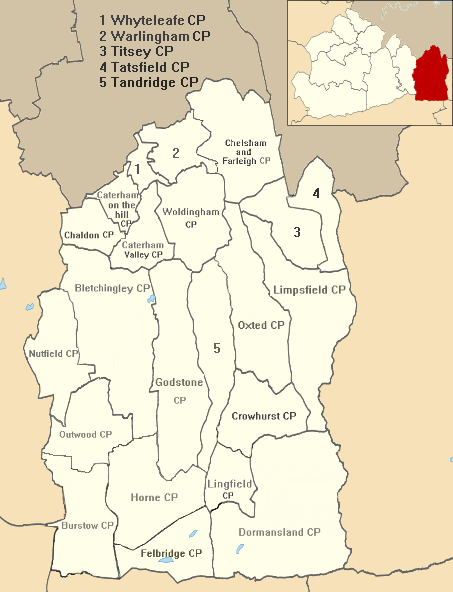
Map showing the position of Felbridge (Civil Parish) in Tandridge

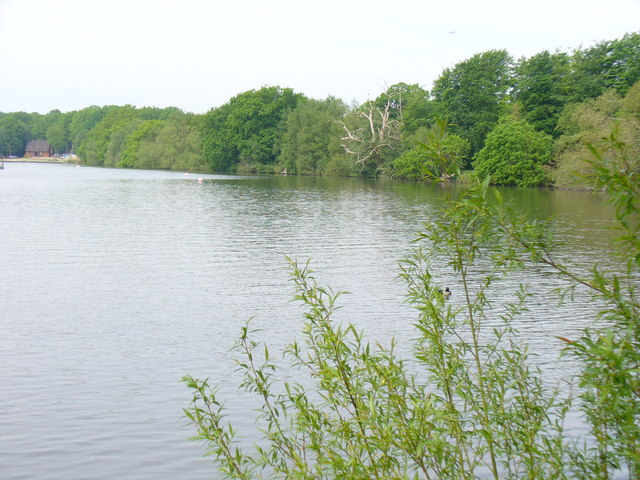
Hedgecourt Lake

Felbridge is centred 8 miles (13 km) south of Oxted, 25 miles (40 km) south of London and 25 miles (40 km) ESE of Surrey's county town, Guildford. It occupies less than one eighth of its district in the extreme mid-south. The east of the village is often referred to as Felcourt.

Hedgecourt lake is immediately northwest of the village centre in the heart of the civil parish, approximately 44 acres (18 ha) in size.

Elevations range between 115m AOB towards the south of the eastern boundary, fields adjoining Chartham Wood and similarly 102m AOB along West Park Road by the Effingham Park Hotel in the southwest, to 53m AOB along Felbridge Water between Felcourt and Newchapel, in the northeast of the parish, a tributary of the River Eden.

The soil, part of a wide 15 miles (24 km) to 20 miles (32 km) band south of the Greensand Ridge, is of "slowly permeable loamy/clayey slightly acid but base-rich soil, however much of the southern half is free-draining slightly acid sandy/loamy soil" as this lies on the remaining gentle upland of Hastings Sand.

== Localities ==
=== Domewood ===
Domewood is an area surrounded on two of its four sides by copses; it faces, across its southern boundary road, Snow Hill (B2037) the Effingham Park Hotel and Golf Course, see Landmarks; and Snow Hill, a similarly semi-wooded neighbourhood interspersed with farms which is part of an area administered by Worth, West Sussex. Separating Domewood from the village centre are Hedgecourt Lake and small surrounding copses.

=== Wire Mill lake and inn ===
Wire Mill forms a separate area which is focussed on and around a short lane, Wire Mill Lane, which ends with the Wire Mill Inn, Toad Hall and Mill End House all overlooking a small weir which releases the water from the Wire Mill Lake.

== Landmarks ==
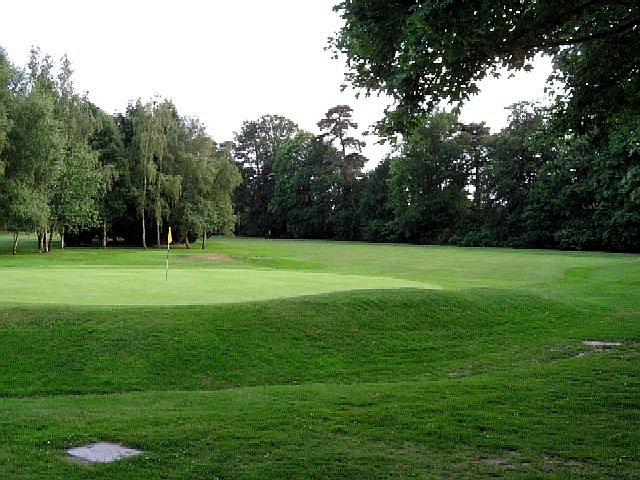
Effingham Park Golf Course, Felbridge

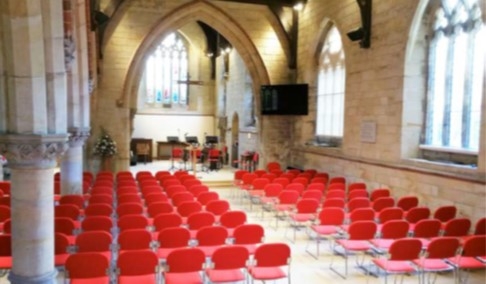
Interior of St John's Felbridge following modernisation in 2016

=== Felbridge County Primary School ===
This listed building marks a tapering triangular intersection between the village centre's longest streets, Copthorne Road and Crawley Down road that several times forms the West Sussex boundary. In 1783 James Evelyn (descendant of John Evelyn, the diarist and famous architectural, landscape and cultural figure in Britain) "chose a large house at Hedgecourt Common – arranging for 1½ acres around it to be enclosed and used as a school". The school opened on 4 November 1783 and was substantially enlarged in 1934.

=== Effingham Park Hotel and Golf Course ===
This large, complex, building with part-rounded restaurant in a compact 9 hole golf course forms the southwest outcrop of the parish.

=== St John the Divine parish church ===
The only church in the village is the Church of England parish church of St John the Divine, known as St John's Felbridge, designed by William White and built in 1865. The construction is a fine example of the Victorian Gothic style. An adjoining church hall was erected in 1965 and refurbished in 2012. The interior of the church was redesigned in 1972-74 and modernised in 2016. The evangelical church is part of the Diocese of Southwark and is a member of the Sussex Gospel Partnership.

=== Whittington College ===
The sheltered housing consists of 56 homes, mainly two bedroom bungalows but also large apartments, surrounded by 22 acres (8.9 ha) acres of parkland with an orchard, lake and woodland walks. They are managed by one of the Livery Companies of the City of London, the Mercers' Company. The college was founded under the will of Richard Whittington as a college of priests and almshouse next to the church of St Michael Paternoster Royal in the City of London.

== Transport ==
=== Road ===
Copthorne Road runs through the centre of the village and links onto the A22 near East Grinstead which is about 2 miles (3.2 km) to the southeast.

=== Rail ===
Felbridge's nearest railway stations are on the Oxted Line. East Grinstead railway station is 1.5 miles (2.4 km) southeast of the main road through the village centre; and north of Wire Mill Lake and the Eden Brook, more than thirty homes are nearer to Lingfield railway station to the northeast, which is two stations closer to London.

== Demography and housing ==
The area of the parish is 849 hectares (2,100 acres). At the 2011 United Kingdom census its population had risen from 2,039 (ten years before) to 2,096. Greater than the national and local averages, 52.5% of the population described their health as very good.

The civil parish was created in 1953, so the 1951 figure is that of the historic, undivided parish of Horne.

Population of Felbridge
| Year | 1951 | 1961 | 2001 | 2011 |
| Population | 2,010* | 1,372 | 2,039 | 2,096 |

2011 Census Homes
| Output area | Detached | Semi-detached | Terraced | Flats and apartments | Caravans/temporary/mobile homes | shared between households |
|---|---|---|---|---|---|---|
| (Civil Parish) | 578 | 149 | 37 | 56 | 9 | 0 |

The average level of accommodation in the region composed of detached houses was 28%, the average that was apartments was 22.6%.

2011 Census Key Statistics
| Output area | Population | Households | % Owned outright | % Owned with a loan | hectares |
|---|---|---|---|---|---|
| (Civil Parish) | 2,096 | 829 | 41.1% | 41.6% | 849 |

The proportion of households in the civil parish who owned their home outright compares to the regional average of 35.1%. The proportion who owned their home with a loan compares to the regional average of 32.5%. The remaining % is made up of rented dwellings (plus a negligible % of households living rent-free).

== Notable people ==
- James Vowles (born 1979), engineer and current Williams Formula 1 Team principal and racing driver
