= Lingfield, Surrey =

Village, civil parish and post town in Tandridge District, Surrey, South East England

Coordinates: 51.175°N 0.0171°W

Lingfield
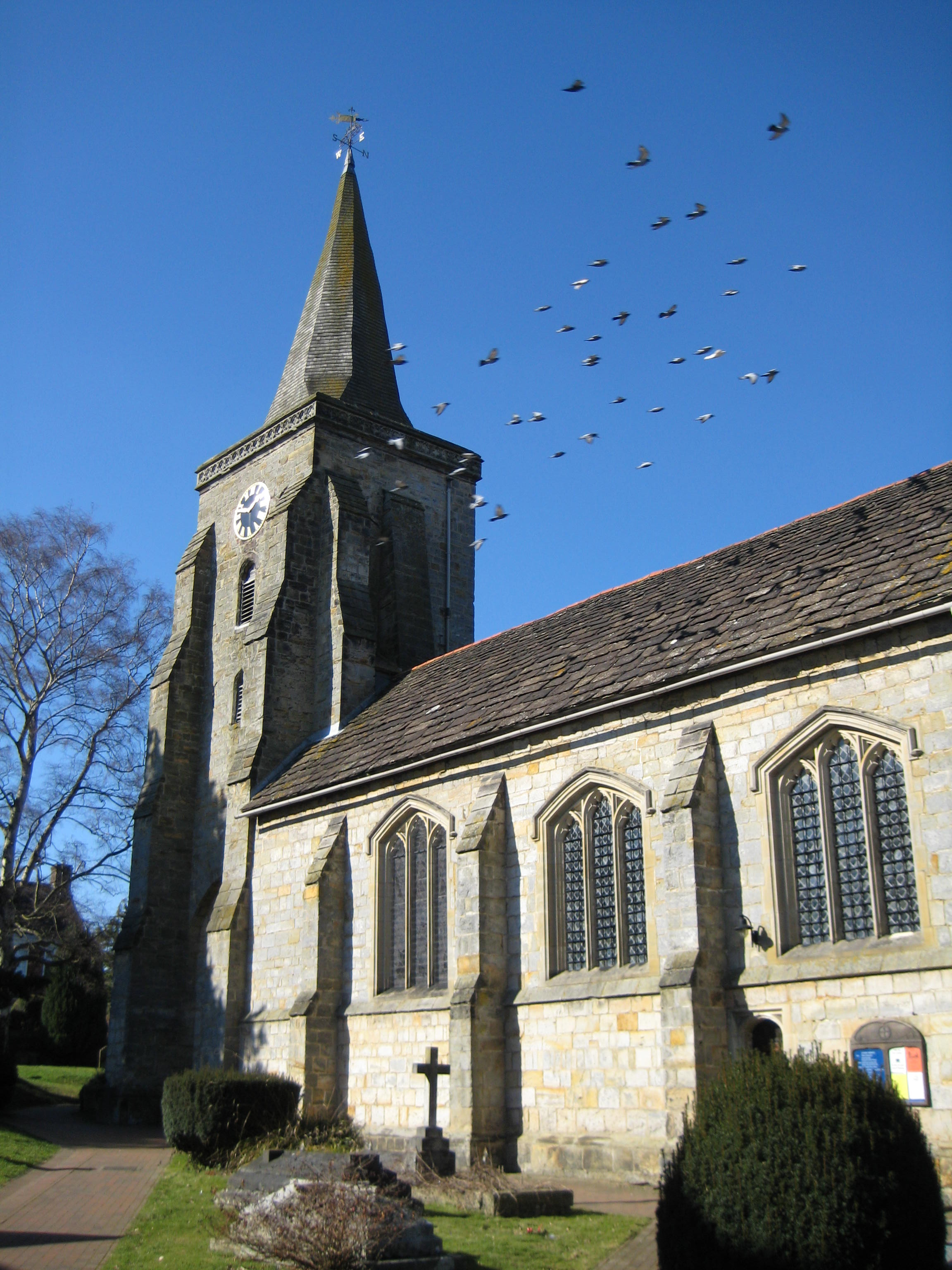
- Grade I listed Church of Saints Peter and Paul

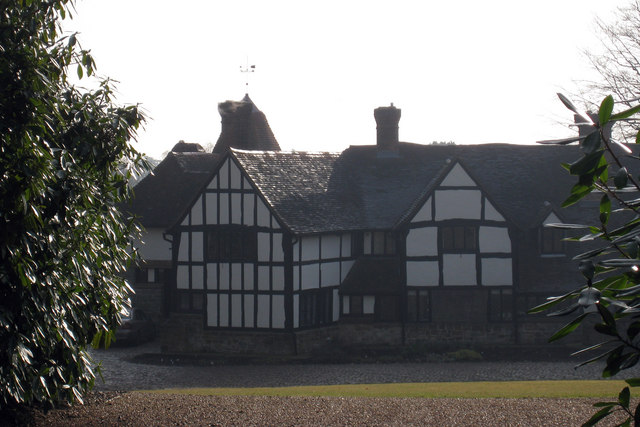
- Example of Tudor period architecture in Lingfield

- Location within Surrey
- Area: 8.76 km^{2} (3.38 sq mi)
- Population: 4,467 (Civil Parish 2011)
  - Density: 510/km^{2} (1,300/sq mi)
- OS grid reference: TQ395385
  - London: 23.4 miles (37.7 km)
- Civil parish: Lingfield
- District: Tandridge
- Shire county: Surrey
- Region: South East
- Country: England
- Sovereign state: United Kingdom
- Post town: LINGFIELD
- Postcode district: RH7
- Dialling code: 01342
- Police: Surrey
- Fire: Surrey
- Ambulance: South East Coast
- UK Parliament: East Surrey

Lingfield is a village and civil parish in the Tandridge district of Surrey, England, approximately 23 miles (37 km) south of London. Several buildings date from the Tudor period and the timber-frame medieval church is Grade I listed. The stone cage or old gaol, constructed in 1773, was last used in 1882 to hold a poacher.

Lingfield Park Racecourse is to the south of the village. In addition to turf racing over jumps, there is also an all-weather course for flat racing.

== History ==
The village lay within the Anglo-Saxon administrative division of Tandridge hundred.

Lingfield was not listed in the Domesday Book of 1086, but is shown on the map as Leangafeld, its spelling in 871AD.

The southern part of the parish is in the old iron district. A forge and a furnace 'about Copthorne and Lingfield' were owned by Lady Gage in 1574, and Clarke's pond and Cook's pond may have been heads for water power to work hammers. Henry Malden wrote in 1911 that Lingfield is mostly:

...agricultural, but since the opening of the railway station on the ...line from Croydon to East Grinstead in 1884, the laying out of the Dormansland estate with the opening of a station there, and the making of the Lingfield Park racecourse, where another railway station has been opened, the village has become a small town and building has been carried out at Plaistow Street and elsewhere. The Victoria Memorial Institute was built by subscription in 1901. It contains reading rooms and a library. A parish school and infants' school were founded in 1849. The old schoolhouse belonging to a school which Lord Howard of Effingham endowed with £3 a year was sold and the proceeds applied to the new schools. The school was rebuilt in 1860. The infants' school was carried on in the old building until the latter was rebuilt in 1906. Baldwin Hill School was built in 1874 and enlarged in 1898.

On the creation of Surrey County Council in the late 19th century, the civil parish's responsibilities became somewhat lessened but its area was approximately the same as in the medieval period, 36.8 square kilometres (14.2 sq mi) and it was this size which led to the decision to make Lingfield a post town across an even larger area.

With the backing of the Women's Farm and Garden Union, Louisa Wilkins and Katherine Courtauld established a cooperative set of small holdings in 1920 on Wire Mill Lane in Lingfield. Surrey County Council created small holdings for over 250 servicemen in Surrey. It was the small holdings at Lingfield that provided small holdings for women. The initial funders included Margaret Ashton and Sydney Renee Courtauld and the experiment lasted until the 1930s.

== Landmarks ==
The Church of St. Peter and St. Paul was rebuilt in 1431, although the original 14th-century tower remains. Its collection of monumental brasses and monuments are amongst the finest in England, including the impressive tomb of Reginald de Cobham, 1st Baron Cobham. There had been a church on the site for some centuries before the 14th-century building. Listed at Grade I, the highest category of architectural listing, the church is among a low percentage to have this status in the country.

The area around the church has been designated a conservation area as it has many early preserved buildings from the 16th to 18th centuries. In the main street, there is a cross and village cage. Unusually highly listed buildings merit mention below.

=== Cage, St Peter's Cross, Old Town Hall and Cottage ===
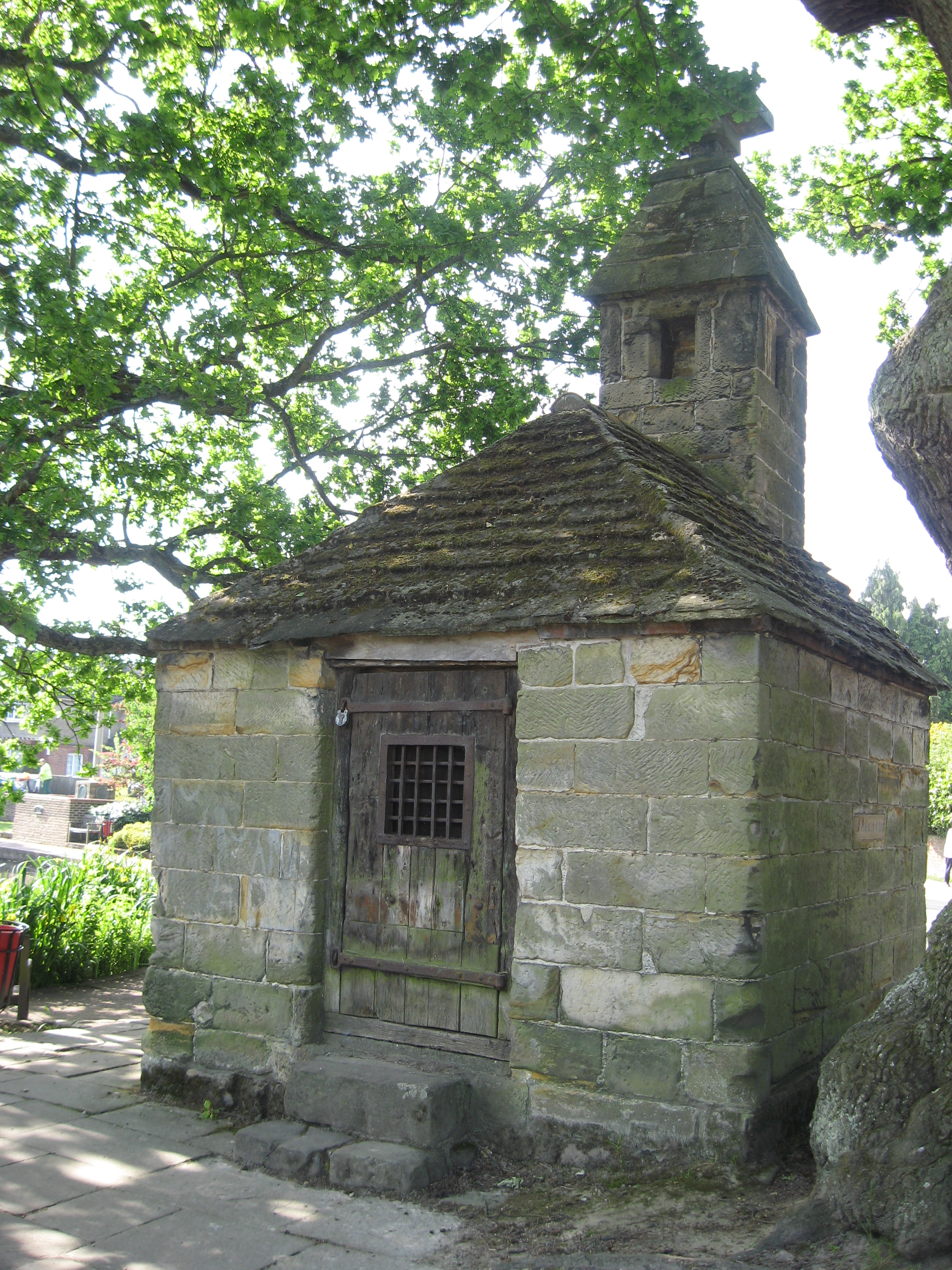
Cage (or Old Gaol) and pillared cross

The cage, last used in 1882 to hold a poacher, was built in 1773.

Old Town Hall and Old Town Cottage form one Grade II* listed building

The journal Le Globe Trotter from 26 February 1903, page 130, describes this place and provides a drawing of it, writing that this is the smallest church in the world, and not a prison place.

=== The Library, Secular Cottage, Magnus Deo, Old House and The Garth ===
The library is housed in the Old Guest House of the College for Secular Chaplains built in 1431 which adjoins and is at Grade II*. This hall-house is all that remains of the original College. Architecturally this building has Grade II* status, so too does the nearby building Magnus Deo. Unusually for an English village, two other buildings are at Grade II* within the village centre, The Old House (pre-Tudor period) and The Garth (1729).

=== Pollard Cottage and Pollard House ===
One secular building in Lingfield has the architectural accolade of Grade I listing: Pollard Cottage/Pollard House, a pre Tudor period hall house which is timber-framed and part whitewashed. To the right is Kentish bracing; to the centre flying braces across the centre first floor and forming the lower part of the roof coved eaves. Dragon posts and dragon beams, alongside irregular leaded windows add to the well-surviving display of medieval architecture.

=== Church House and Star Inn Cottages ===
This narrow terrace of Grade II* listed cottages is at the end of the narrow central street leading to the church though excluding the end-of-terrace Church Gate Cottage which is lower listed, dates to the Tudor period with a Georgian front including a deep wooden modillion eaves cornice, formerly in part an Inn.

=== Remains of Starborough Castle and Moat ===
In what was the parish until 2000 but is Dormansland civil parish 2 miles (3.2 km) east is the site of Starborough Castle, fortified by Lord Cobham (a medieval peerage) in 1341. Little now remains except parts of its walls, Grade II* listed and the moat, which is stone revetted, waterfilled and in good condition.

Lingfield is also home to one of the world's oldest cricket clubs, with the first recorded match being against London on 18 June 1739.

== Geography ==
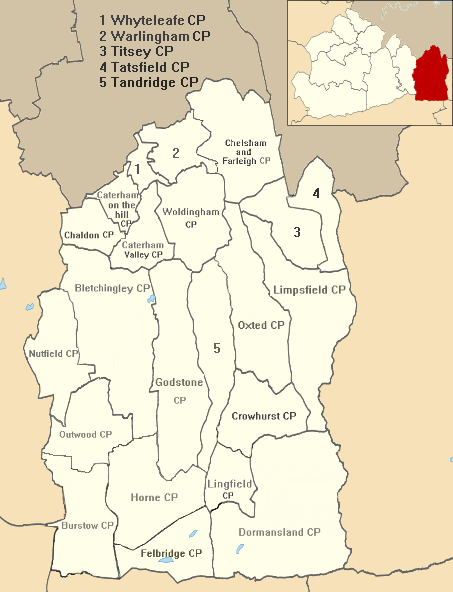
Lingfield's location in Tandridge District is shown above. The Prime Meridian passes close to the eastern border of Lingfield.

London is (centred) 23.4 miles (37.7 km) north-by-northwest and Oxted, the administrative centre of Tandridge is 5.3 miles (8.5 km) north. Guildford, Surrey's county town is 24.3 miles (39.1 km) west-by-northwest.

Elevations range between 76m AOD in Lingfield Park Golf Course adjoining Lingfield Park and Felcourt to 46.5m AOD along the northern border, the Eden Brook from Moat Farm to the railway line.

== Notable venues ==
=== Social and activity clubs ===
Among these are:

- Lingfield and Dormansland Rifle Club for competition shooters
- Lingfield Silver Band – a traditional Silver band.

=== Charities ===
Lingfield hosts the national charity Young Epilepsy (formerly named NCYPE/St. Piers/Lingfield Hospital School/Lingfield Epileptic Colony), which provides residential care and education for students with epilepsy and learning difficulties.

Nearby to the west of the A22 at Newchapel is the London England Temple of the Church of Jesus Christ of Latter-day Saints, known as the Mormon Temple.

== Culture and Community ==
Lingfield Civil Parish run annual events, meetings and village hall facilities offered by the third-tier local council.

== Localities ==
=== Felcourt ===
Felcourt's large Manor House and parkland was the head office of Rentokil Initial from 1949 until 2006; converted to apartments and a small business park.

=== Felcourt Farm and Business Park ===
Felcourt Farm is a large dairy farm, having in its area a small business park with 15 units, rented to businesses or available for rent.

== Sport and leisure ==
Lingfield has a Non-League football club, Lingfield F.C., who play at The Sports Pavilion.

Lingfield has another thriving sport with cricket clubs also playing in the village.

A short lived greyhound racing track was opened from October 1991 until 1992 at the Nestledown Kennels off the Eastbourne Road. It had served as a schooling track previously but the racing took place on Saturdays at 1.00pm. The track had a large circumference of 475 metres with race distances of 300, 475 and 700 yards and two hares available, an Inside Sumner and an Outside McKee. The racing was independent (not affiliated to the sports governing body the National Greyhound Racing Club) and was known as a flapping track, which was the nickname given to independent tracks.

== Transport ==
=== Rail ===
Lingfield railway station is on the East Grinstead branch of the Oxted line to London Victoria station and London Bridge station.

=== Bus ===
Bus services cover destinations such as Caterham, Oxted, Redhill, Crawley, Edenbridge, Dormansland and East Grinstead and are Southdown, Cruisers and Metrobus operations.

== Demography and housing ==
2011 Census Homes
Output area	Detached	Semi-detached	Terraced	Flats and apartments	Caravans/temporary/mobile homes	shared between households
(Civil Parish)	634	518	316	284	68	2

The average level of accommodation in the region composed of detached houses was 28%, the average that was apartments was 22.6%.

2011 Census Key Statistics
Output area	Population	Households	% Owned outright	% Owned with a loan	hectares
(Civil Parish)	4,467	1,822	36.7%	36.3%	876

The proportion of households in the civil parish who owned their home outright compares to the regional average of 35.1%. The proportion who owned their home with a loan compares to the regional average of 32.5%. The remaining % is made up of rented dwellings (plus a negligible % of households living rent-free).

== See also ==
- List of places of worship in Tandridge (district)
