= Godstone =

Village and parish in Surrey, England

Coordinates: 51°14′53″N 0°03′50″W

- Village
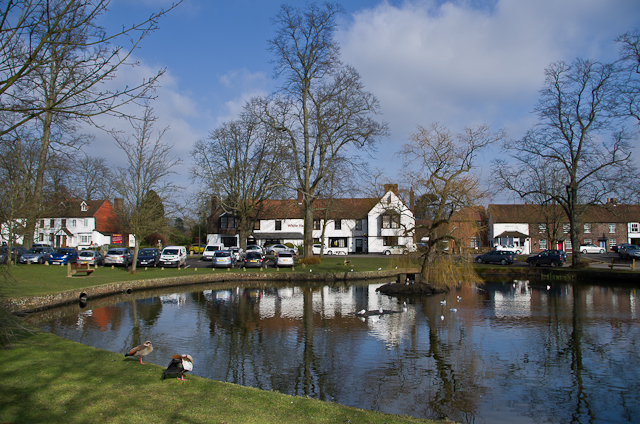
- The pond at Godstone Green

- Location within Surrey
- Area: 18.06 km^{2} (6.97 sq mi)
- Population: 5,949 (Civil Parish 2011)
  - Density: 329/km^{2} (850/sq mi)
- OS grid reference: TQ3551
- Civil parish: Godstone
- District: Tandridge
- Shire county: Surrey
- Region: South East
- Country: England
- Sovereign state: United Kingdom
- Post town: GODSTONE
- Postcode district: RH9
- Dialling code: 01883
- Police: Surrey
- Fire: Surrey
- Ambulance: South East Coast
- UK Parliament: East Surrey

Godstone is a village and civil parish in the Tandridge District of Surrey, England. It is 6 miles (9.7 km) east of Reigate, 3 miles (4.8 km) west of Oxted, 22 miles (35 km) east of Guildford and 18 miles (29 km) south of London. Close to the North Downs, both the North Downs Way and the Greensand Way pass through Godstone.

== Etymology ==
The earliest known appearance of the name is Godeston from AD 1248. It was subsequently known as Godestone, Godiston, Codeston, Codestone, Coddestone, Coddeston and Goddeston. The name took its current form in AD 1548.

The root itself is uncertain but is the same as the towns of Godalming and Godmanchester, suggesting it may be derived from the ethnonym of the Goths who settled Sub-Roman Britain. It appears the town was part of a Sub-Roman network, linked via old Roman road to Goddards Green and Ditchling in Sussex.

A proposed link with Godgifu, daughter of Æthelred the Unready, is speculative. The Domesday Book of 1086 does record the parish as being held by her widower, Count Eustace II of Boulogne, but there is no indication the hamlet was named for her. Attributions to a non-historical founder named Cōd are examples of founding myths.

== History ==
Godstone was originally merely a hamlet in the parish of Walkingstead, with the centre of population later shifting from the latter to the former. It appears that the manor-houses of Marden and Lagham were centres of population till the inhabitants were nearly exterminated by the Black Death of 1349.

The village lay within the Anglo-Saxon administrative division of Tandridge hundred. It was built along a stretch of the London to Brighton Way Roman road, which came through the high Caterham Gap and continues southward along Tilburstow Hill Road. The church gave its name to another and probably earlier settlement on the main road, which then passed by Marden Park and went on to Lagham.

In the 1800s, stone was quarried at Godstone. The mine is no longer in production but is used by the caving community.

In February 2025, sinkholes appeared in Godstone's High Street, perhaps associated with old mine workings.

== Geography ==
The heart of Godstone consists of two centres, Church Town and Godstone Green, linked by other neighbourhoods. Both are now conservation areas. Overall the long north–south parish covers 1,806 hectares (4,460 acres) and through its length of approximately 3 miles (4.8 km) the A22 road runs.

Church Town has old timber-framed buildings. The Old Packhouse, dating from the 15th century, is the oldest timber-framed building in the town. In the 18th century, brick became the fashionable material for house building, and Church End and Church House, opposite the church, are two listed architectural examples.

St Nicholas Church dominates Church Town. James Evelyn of Felbridge House built a memorial chapel in 1787, which has the tombs of Sir John and Lady Evelyn. The North aisle was built in about 1845. Sir George Gilbert Scott's restoration of the church in 1872–3 involved widening of the chancel arch, inserting a new north side to the chancel, new windows to the nave and east end, and adding the south aisle. The churchyard contains a notable sarsen stone marking the grave of Walker Miles whose work in the early days of the "Ramblers' movement" contributed to the formation of the Ramblers of Great Britain.

At the same time, Sir George Gilbert Scott designed St Mary's almshouses next to St Nicholas Church for Mrs Mabel Hunt of Wonham House, in memory of her only daughter who had died at the age of sixteen. Built in a Victorian Tudor/gothic style, they include eight self-contained houses, a wardens house and a beautiful little chapel, dedicated to St Mary. The flèch-capped chapel and the gables compose a very pretty hamlet.

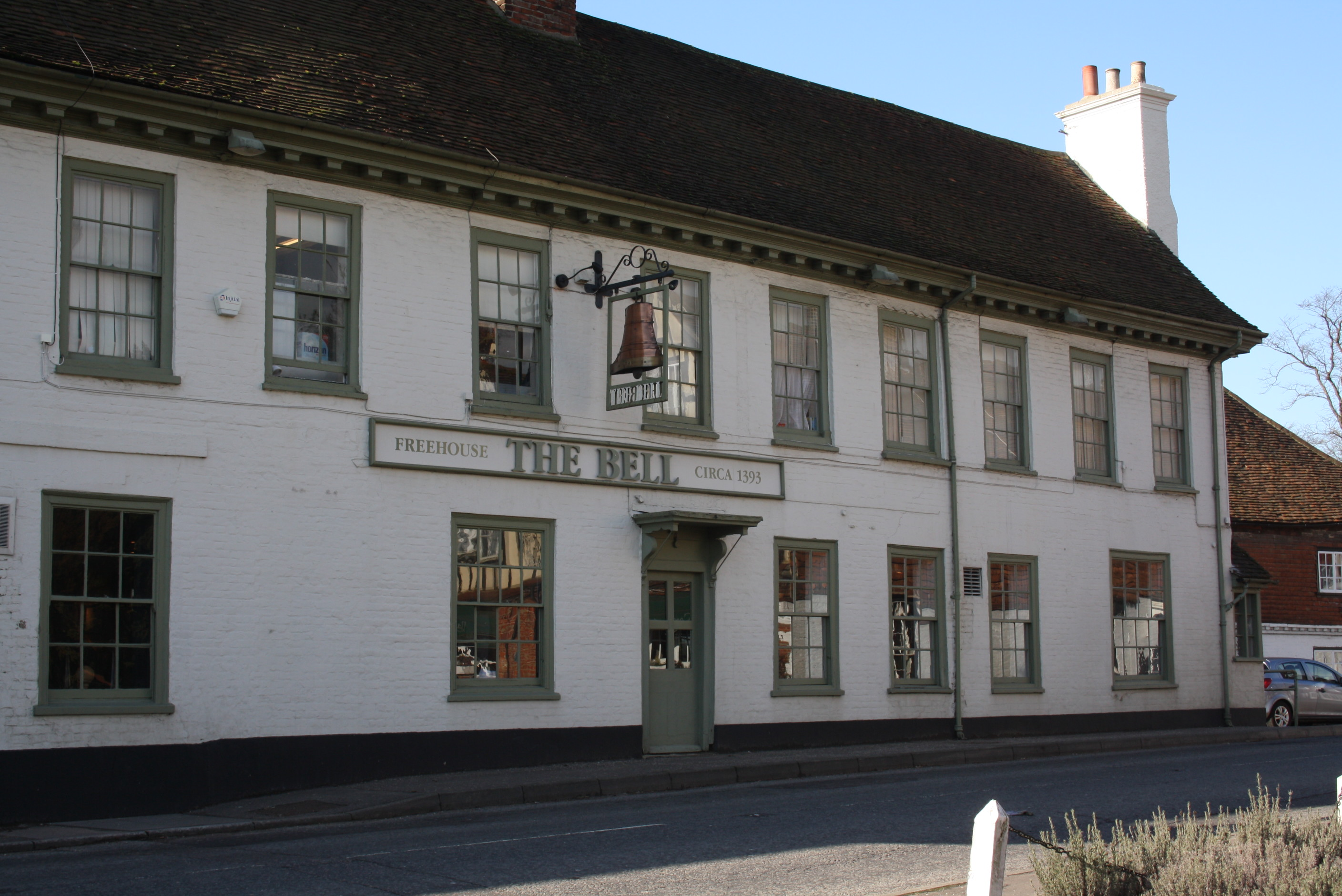
The Bell Inn

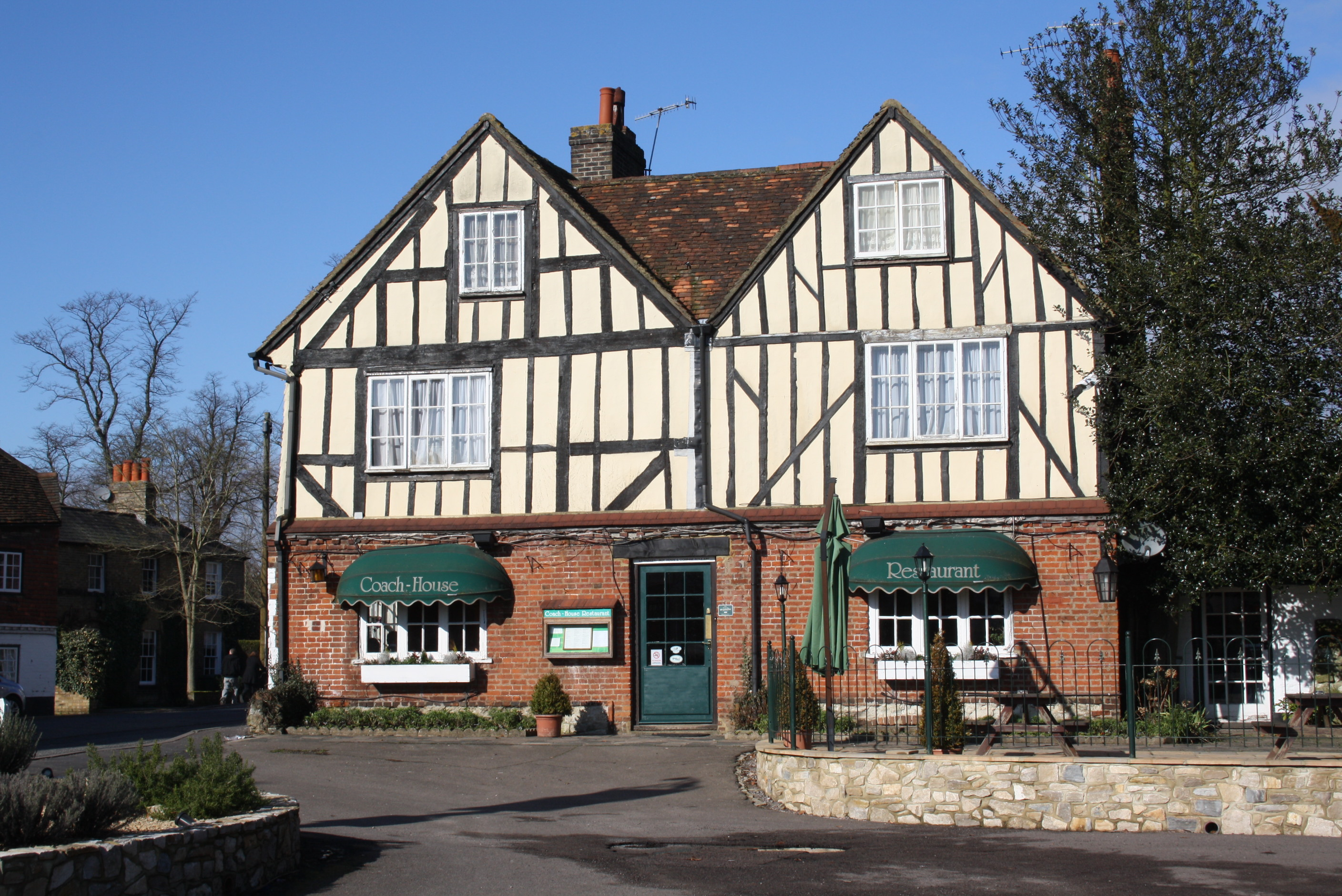
Coach House Inn and restaurant

Godstone Green became a busy centre of roads and vehicles during the growth of wheeled traffic in the 16th century, an era which spawned the establishment of Godstone's numerous inns. A number of houses built entirely of brick appeared in the 18th century, notably the row in the High Street.

During the 19th century, The Pond at Godstone Green was used as a horse-pond with a sloping bank down which the wagoners drove their horses.

In the very core of the village is a triangular island, which in Victorian times, was densely packed with a remarkable number of cottages intersected by alleys. It is claimed to have been the worst slum in Surrey, which is no longer the case, with each dwelling having been paid much care and attention.

The two parts of Godstone are linked by Bullbeggars Lane, a narrow road leading from the south of the village to the church, and the footpath running from the White Hart pub and its barn, along Bay Pond to Church Lane. The original village around St Nicholas Church was decimated during the great plague of 1342 with the victims being buried in two 'plague pits' in Bullbeggars Lane. Even in death, the sexes were kept separate; men and women were interred in separate pits. The road running past the church was at one time the main coastal road with the present village not being built until Tudor times. The Pack House featured in the Gracie Fields film 'Sing as you dance along', with Gracie dancing along the lane past the cottage which used to be an Inn.

=== South Godstone ===
South Godstone was originally known as Lagham and centred on the old mediæval moated manor house of Lagham, a scheduled ancient monument and Grade II* listed building. It also features a listed brew house, oast house and stable just north on its moat. It forms a neighbourhood buffered by countryside immediately north of Godstone railway station.

It has St Stephen's Church, St Stephen's C of E primary school, a garage, several garden nurseries, a hairdresser, and a sports and social club. There was once a pub opposite the railway station – originally named 'The Railway', it has since been renamed 'The Lagham' – it is currently operating as an Indian Restaurant. The Fox & Hounds on Tilburstow Hill is close by.

It is home to South Godstone FC, whose first team currently compete in Intermediate Division One of the Surrey South Eastern Combination.

=== Blindley Heath ===
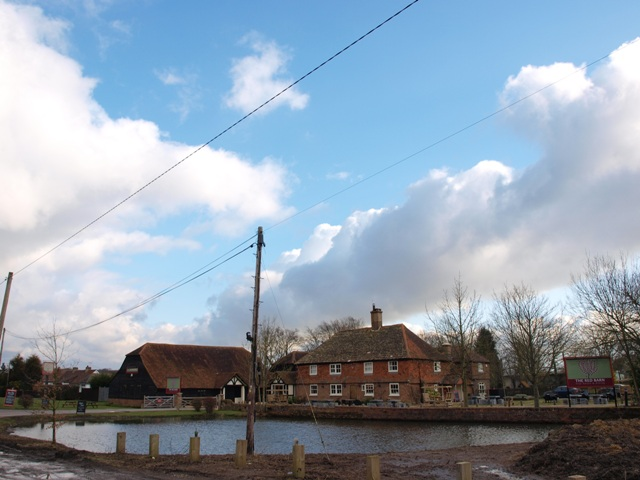
The Red Barn at Blindley Heath with pond

Blindley Heath is the southernmost portion of the parish, a hamlet separated by fields from the village of Godstone. The Blindley Heath Site of Special Scientific Interest is the best known example of a relict damp grassland on Weald Clay in Surrey and has several ponds and a stretch of the Ray Brook. It is also a Local Nature Reserve and is managed by the Surrey Wildlife Trust. There is an active C of E church to St John the Evangelist built in 1842.

=== The Enterdent ===
This is a small parcel of land, tucked away in between Tilburstow Hill Road and Eastbourne Road, to the south of Godstone.

The name Enterdent alludes to a cluster of cottages on the land set in a wooded valley. The origin of the name, the Enterdent, has never been satisfactorily explained. It has previously been known as Lower and Upper Henterden and, in the 19th century, Polly Pains Bottom. It is perhaps the dene or valley between two hills.

The first two dwellings appeared in 1842, and improvements began on the cottages in 1857, now number 6 and 7 The Enterdent. These buildings were enlarged with an extension at the rear and five further cottages were added, making a row of seven. A second terrace of cottages, this time eight in number, appeared further up the valley.

Today, the fifteen original cottages have been converted to eight homes. The additional five cottages from the original terrace have since been converted into two larger properties, number 1 comprising three cottages, and number 5 comprising the remaining two. Numbers 6 and 7 still remain as individual cottages. At the entrance to the Enterdent, from Eastbourne Road, is a Georgian-style house, which was a tea room and a hotel from the 1920s to the 1940s. It has since been converted into two cottages, River Cottage and White Cottage.

Despite all the changes, the Enterdent has essentially remained relatively unaltered. The cottage gardens and vegetable allotments stand to this day, so too do the sandpit, the brook, the woods, and the bluebells.

== Amenities ==
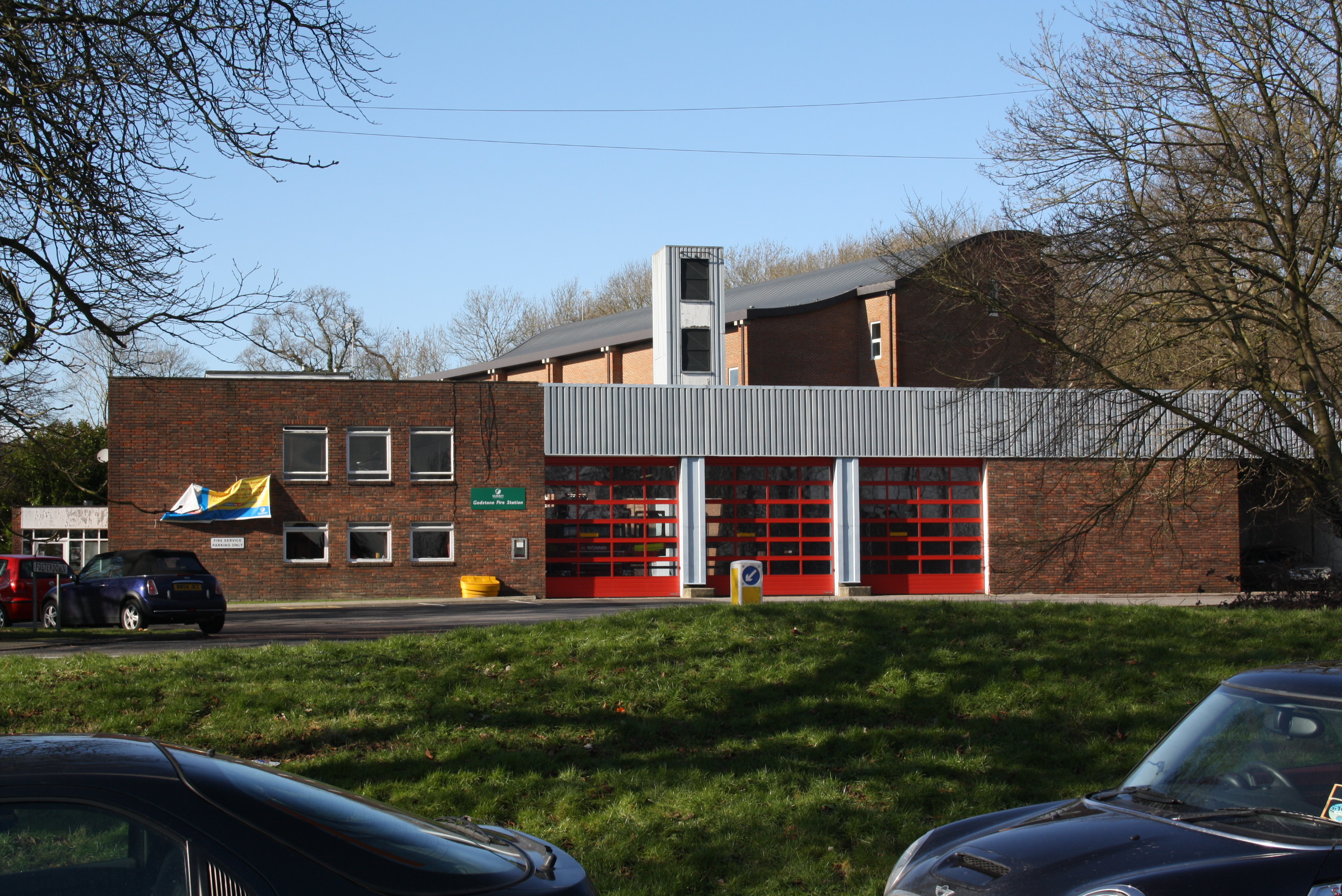
Godstone Fire Station.

Godstone Village School is in the Godstone Green neighbourhood of the village. It caters for children between the ages of 3 and 11.

The Orpheus Centre is an inclusive performing arts college for young adults with physical or learning disabilities, founded in 1998 by British entertainer and musician Richard Stilgoe in his former family home in the village. The CEO is Graham Whitehead. The college is overseen by a voluntary Board of eight, of which the chairman is John Beer OBE.

Godstone Vineyards is a local wine producer selling wine from the premises on Quarry Road. There is a petting zoo and farm by the Vineyards, Godstone Farm.

== Transport ==
Godstone is at the junction of the A22 and A25 long-distance roads, the A22 is designated a trunk road by the National Highways, which leads to Eastbourne, East Sussex. Junction 6 of the M25 motorway is just to the north of the village, immediately south of this junction is the town's fire station. Godstone is also the traffic control centre for the southern M25.

The village is served by Godstone railway station on the Redhill–Tonbridge line which is located in the hamlet of South Godstone (which used to be known as Lagham), approximately 2 miles to the south of the village. The station is served by hourly train services between Redhill and Tonbridge.

Godstone is served by Metrobus route 400 and Southdown PSV routes 409 and 410. These services provide connections to Oxted, Selsdon, Redhill, Caterham, Gatwick Airport, East Grinstead and Crawley.

The Greensand Way, a long-distance footpath, skirts the southern edge of the village en route to Tandridge.

== Sport ==
Godstone is the home of Godstone Football Club, whose first team currently play in the championship of the Mid-Sussex League. Godstone FC U17 RS play in the Epsom & Ewell League Under 18 Premier League, Godstone FC U17 play in Division 2. Godstone FC Vets play a number of friendlies against local sides throughout the season. All home games are played on Godstone Green.

== Governance ==
Local administration is divided between Surrey County Council, where Godstone is represented by one councillor, Chris Farr who is an Independent; and Tandridge District Council, where Godstone has three councillors:

Member Since	Member	Ward
2021	Mike Crane	Godstone
2018	Christopher Farr	Godstone
2020	Colin White	Godstone

There is also a parish council with 9 members.

== Demography and housing ==
2011 Census Homes
Output area	Detached	Semi-detached	Terraced	Flats and apartments	Caravans/temporary/mobile homes	shared between households
(Civil Parish)	655	824	498	406	3	0

The average level of accommodation in the region composed of detached houses was 28%, the average that was apartments was 22.6%.

2011 Census Key Statistics
Output area	Population	Households	% Owned outright	% Owned with a loan	hectares
(Civil Parish)	5,949	2,386	32.5%	39.3%	1,806

The proportion of households in the civil parish who owned their home outright compares to the regional average of 35.1%. The proportion who owned their home with a loan compares to the regional average of 32.5%. The remaining % is made up of rented dwellings (plus a negligible % of households living rent-free).

== 2009 E. coli outbreak ==
In 2009, 93 people were infected by an outbreak of the E. coli bacteria at Godstone Farm, liability for which the farm subsequently accepted.

== See also ==
- List of places of worship in Tandridge (district)
