= List of monastic houses in Surrey =

Locations of monastic houses in Surrey
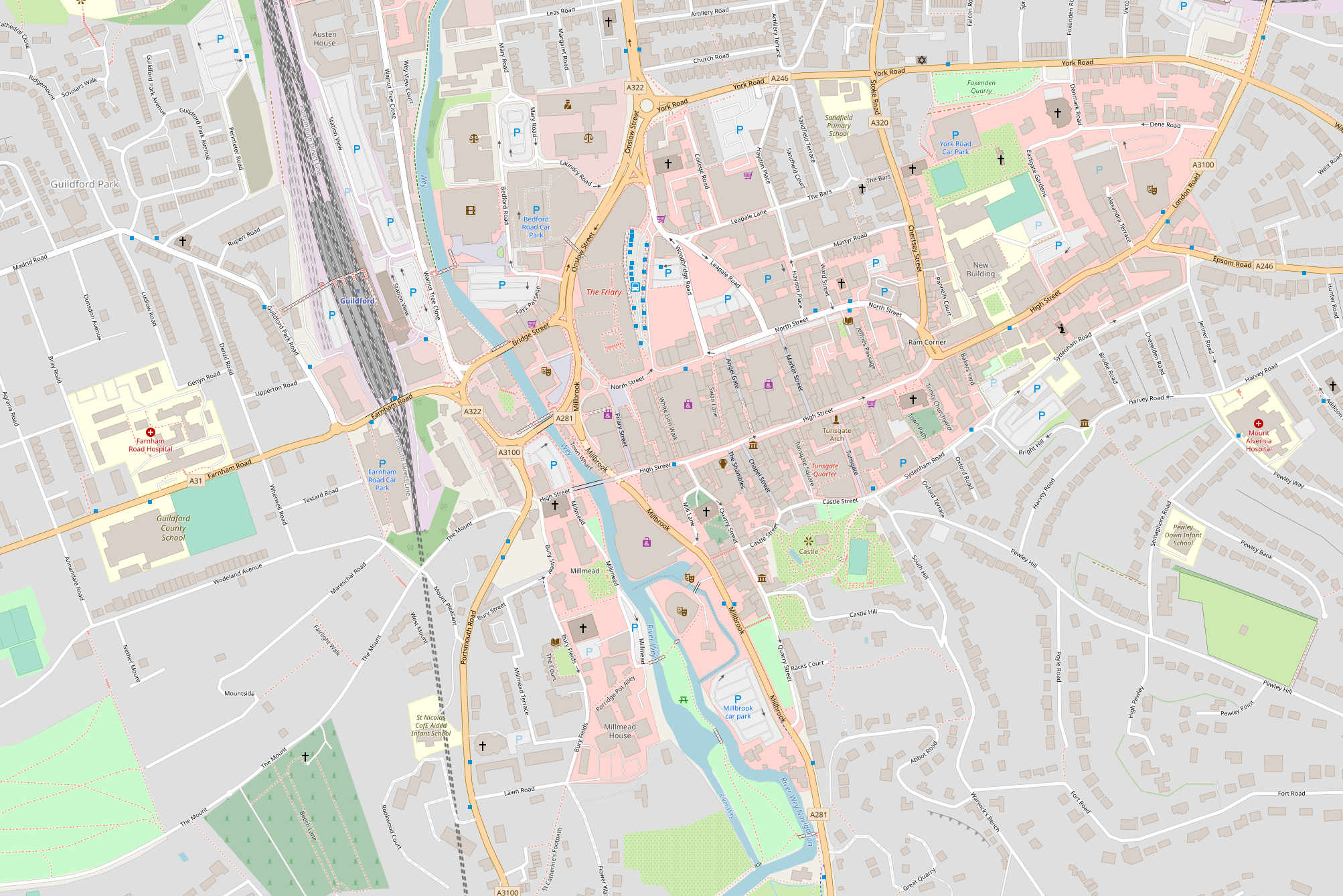
Locations of monastic houses in Guildford

The following is a list of the monastic houses in Surrey, England.

Alien houses are included, as are smaller establishments such as cells and notable monastic granges (particularly those with resident monks), and also camerae of the military orders of monks (Knights Templar and Knights Hospitaller). Monastic hospitals are included where they had the status or function of an abbey, priory, or preceptor/commandery.

Abbreviations and key

Status of remains
Symbol	Status
None	Ruins
*	Current monastic function
^{+}	Current non-monastic ecclesiastic function (including remains incorporated into later structure)
^	Current non-ecclesiastic function (including remains incorporated into later structure) or redundant intact structure
^{$}	Remains limited to earthworks etc.
^{#}	No identifiable trace of the monastic foundation remains
^{~}	Exact site of monastic foundation unknown
^{≈}	Identification ambiguous or confused

Locations with names in italics indicate possible duplication (misidentification with another location) or non-existent foundations (either erroneous reference or proposed foundation never implemented) or ecclesiastical establishments with a monastic name but lacking actual monastic connection.

Trusteeship
EH	English Heritage
LT	Landmark Trust
NT	National Trust

Foundation	Image	Communities & provenance	Formal name or dedication & alternative names	References & location
Almners Priory		17th century priory		51°23′25″N 0°31′53″W
Bermondsey Abbey	Historical county location. See List of monastic houses in London			
Bermondsey Minster	Historical county location. See List of monastic houses in London			
Chertsey Abbey		Saxon Benedictine? monks founded 666; destroyed in raids by the Danes c.872 secular Benedictine monks refounded before 964; dissolved 1537	The Abbey Church of Saint Peter, Chertsey	51°23′37″N 0°30′06″W
Guildford Blackfriars		Dominican Friars (under the Visitation of London) founded 1275 by Queen Eleanor of Provence, widow of Henry III; proposal by Edward III to refound as a Dominican nunnery never transpired; dissolved 1538; site now occupied by 'The Friary' shopping centre	St Dominic?	51°14′12″N 0°34′35″W
Guildford Friars de Ordine Martyrum		Friars de Ordine Martyrum founded 1260; possible Polish congregation of Crutched Friars; dissolution unknown		51°13′54″N 0°35′00″W
Guildford Crutched Friars (?)		alleged house of Crutched Friars (Note: Guildford Crutched Friars - sole source John Speed, (1627), History of Great Britaine 2nd Ed. (in the 1st Ed. (1611) St Cross was ascribed to the Dominicans)) possibly identical with Polish Crutched Friars house (see immediately above) (Note: Guildford Crutched Friars - Polish congregation?: Dr Little)	St Cross?	51°13′54″N 0°35′00″W
Horne Priory		Carthusian monks projected: king's licence granted to Mary de St Paul, Countess of Pembroke c.1345 to endow and build a house for Carthusians, appears not to have been completed	Hourne Priory	
Horsley Priory ^{≈}		Benedictine nuns supposedly at Rowbarnes, East Horseley; dissolution unknown		51°15′25″N 0°27′13″W
Laleham Abbey *		Benedictine monks founded 13th century; The Community of St Peter the Apostle (Westminster)		
Leatherhead Priory (?)^{≈}		Cistercian monks alleged monastery, founded 1263; incorporated into house called 'The Priory'; evidence lacking		51°17′31″N 0°19′41″W
Merton Priory	Historical county location. See entry under List of monastic houses in London			
Newark Priory		possible hospital Augustinian Canons Regular founded c.1189 (during or before the reign of Richard I) by Ruald de Calva and his wife Beatrice; dissolved 1539; granted to Sir Antony Brown 1544/5	The Priory Church of The Blessed Virgin Mary and Saint Thomas a Becket, Newark ____________________; Adbury Priory; Aldebury Priory	51°18′32″N 0°30′25″W
Oxenford Priory (?)		Benedictine nuns foundation unknown; manor belonged to Waverley (from before 1147), "no trace of separate foundation" (Note: Oxenford - Dugdale, (1468), Monasticon Anglianum vi 1624), dissolved after 1305(?)		
Reigate Priory		hospital founded 1217-1235 by William de Warren, Earl of Surrey; Augustinian Canons Regular founded 1235; also given as Crutched Friars (possibly Flemish branch, or earlier Fratres Cruciferi 'Augustinian Hospitallers') dissolved 1535; granted to William Lord Howard 1541/2; conventual buildings largely demolished and replaced by a house 1541; rebuilt as a Palladian mansion 1771; since 1948 in use as a school located in public Priory Park, with a public museum		51°14′08″N 0°12′23″W
Richmond Friary (Greyfriars and Austin Friars)	Historical county location. See List of monastic houses in London			
Sheen Priory	Historical county location. See List of monastic houses in London			
Sheen Friary	Historical county location. See List of monastic houses in London			
Syon Priory	Historical county location. See List of monastic houses in London			
Southwark Priory	Historical county location. See List of monastic houses in London			
Tandridge Priory		hospital founded 1189 by Odo de Dammartin, possibly ceasing to exist 1218-22; Augustinian Canons Regular founded after(?) 1218 (c.1200); dissolved 1538 (1537); granted to John Rede 1537/8	The Priory Church of Saint James, Tandridge ____________________; Tanregge Priory	51°15′14″N 0°01′38″W
Tooting Bec Priory	Historical county location. See List of monastic houses in London			
Wanborough Grange		Cistercian monks grange of Waverley, founded 1130; dissolved 1536; barn restored 1997, owned by Guildford Borough Council, maintained by the Guildford Museum		51°13′54″N 0°39′48″W
Waverley Abbey		Cistercian monks dependent on L'Aumône; founded 24 November 1128 (or 28 October 1129, possibly when functional for full regular life) by William Giffard, Bishop of Winchester; dissolved 1536; granted to Sir William Fitz William 1536/7; (EH)	The Abbey Church of Saint Mary, Waverley	51°12′00″N 0°45′33″W
Woking Monastery		Saxon monastery purported dependency of Peterborough founded c.690 (in the time of Abbot Cuthbert) granted to Peterborough by Brordar, and ealdorman, with the consent of Offa; thought to have been destroyed in raids by the Danes 871	St Peter ____________________; Wockingas Monastery; Wocingas Minster; Old Woking Monastery; Woking Minster	51°18′44″N 0°34′00″W

The following establishments have no monastic connection:

- Nutfield Priory — hotel in Nutfield, Surrey

== See also ==
- List of monastic houses in England
