= All Saints Church, Oxted =

Catholic parish in Surrey, England

All Saints Church
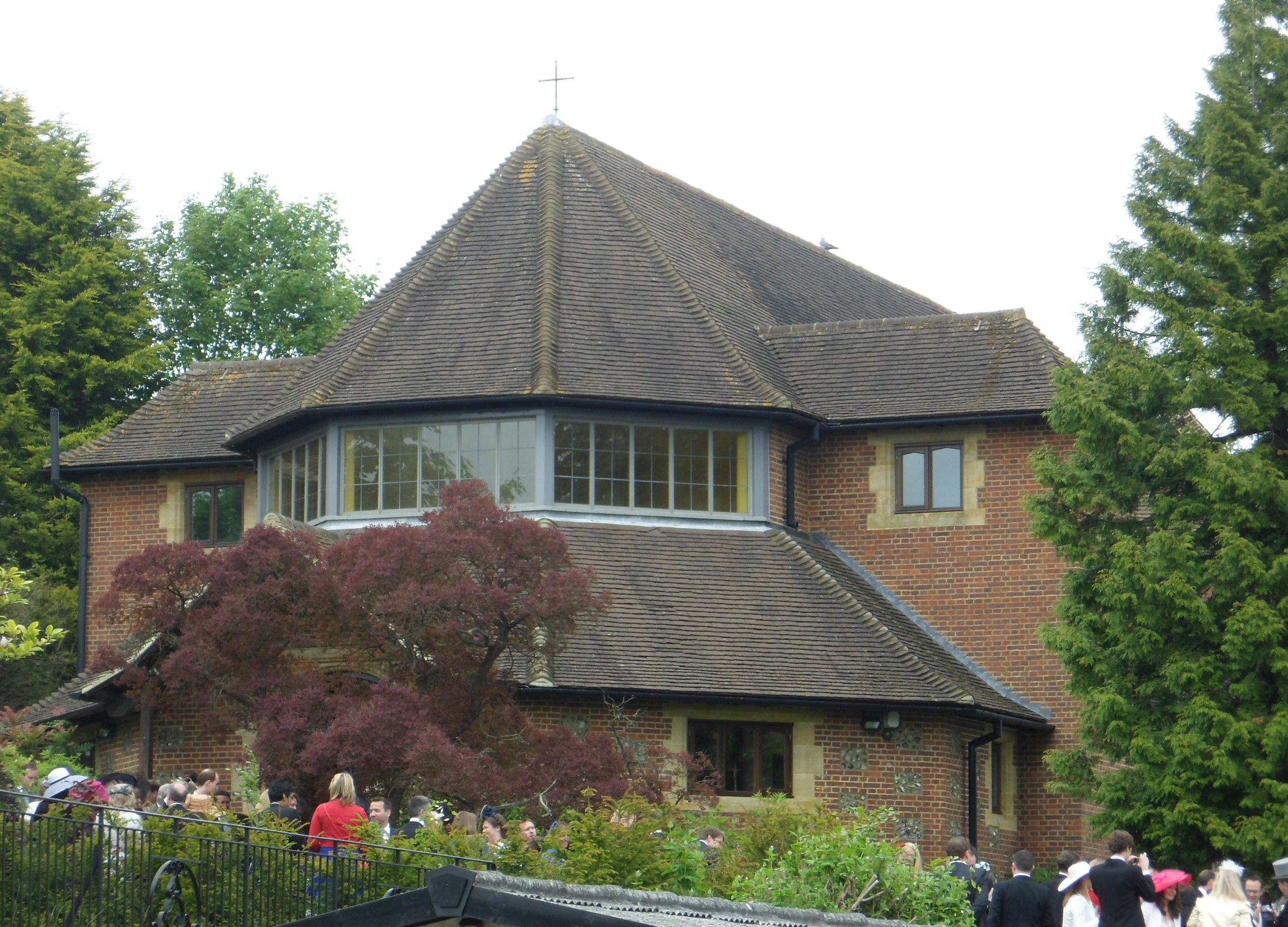
- West side of the church

- Location in Surrey
- 51°15′39″N 0°00′16″W
- Location: Oxted, Surrey
- Country: England
- Denomination: Catholic Church
- Sui iuris church: Latin Church
- Churchmanship: Roman Rite
- Website: OxtedandWarlinghamParish.org

History
- Status: Active
- Founder: Fr Algernon Lang
- Dedication: All Saints

Architecture
- Functional status: Parish church
- Heritage designation: Grade II listed
- Designated: 23 November 1998
- Architect: James Leonard Williams
- Groundbreaking: 3 August 1914
- Completed: 1928

Administration
- Province: Southwark
- Diocese: Arundel and Brighton
- Deanery: Redhill
- Parish: Oxted and Warlingham

All Saints Church is a Catholic parish church in Oxted, Surrey. Building work on the church started in 1913 and was delayed by World War I. Aspects of the church interior were designed by Geoffrey Webb. It is situated off Chichele Road north of the town centre, to the west of Oxted School. It is a Grade II listed building.

== History ==
=== Construction ===
In 1914, Fr Algernon Lang came to Oxted and sought a suitable location for a church for the local Catholic population. He bought a house at 12 Chichele Road and decided to build the church on the land directly behind the house. The house itself was built in 1913 from materials gathered from a demolished house in Godstone. The foundation stone of the church was laid on 3 August 1914, the day before the start of World War I.

Work continued until December 1914. By that time, the sacristy, crypt and chancel were completed. Work recommenced after the war ended. The exterior walls of the church were completed on 7 December 1920. The sanctuary and nave were design by James Leonard Williams. He also designed St George's Church in Sudbury, and died in 1926, before both St George Church and All Saints Church were completed.

=== Interior ===
Interior construction continued until 6 July 1927 when the church was consecrated. The rood screen was designed by Williams. The ceiling, organ gallery and reredos were designed by Geoffrey Webb. The reredos is a painted copy of the Coronation of the Virgin by Fra Angelico, it was designed by Webb and built by Robert Bridgeman of Lichfield.

=== Extension ===
In 2001, the west side of the church was extended. The architect was Deirdre Waddington, who also designed the 2008–2009 renovation of the Friary Church of St Francis and St Anthony in Crawley.

== Parish ==
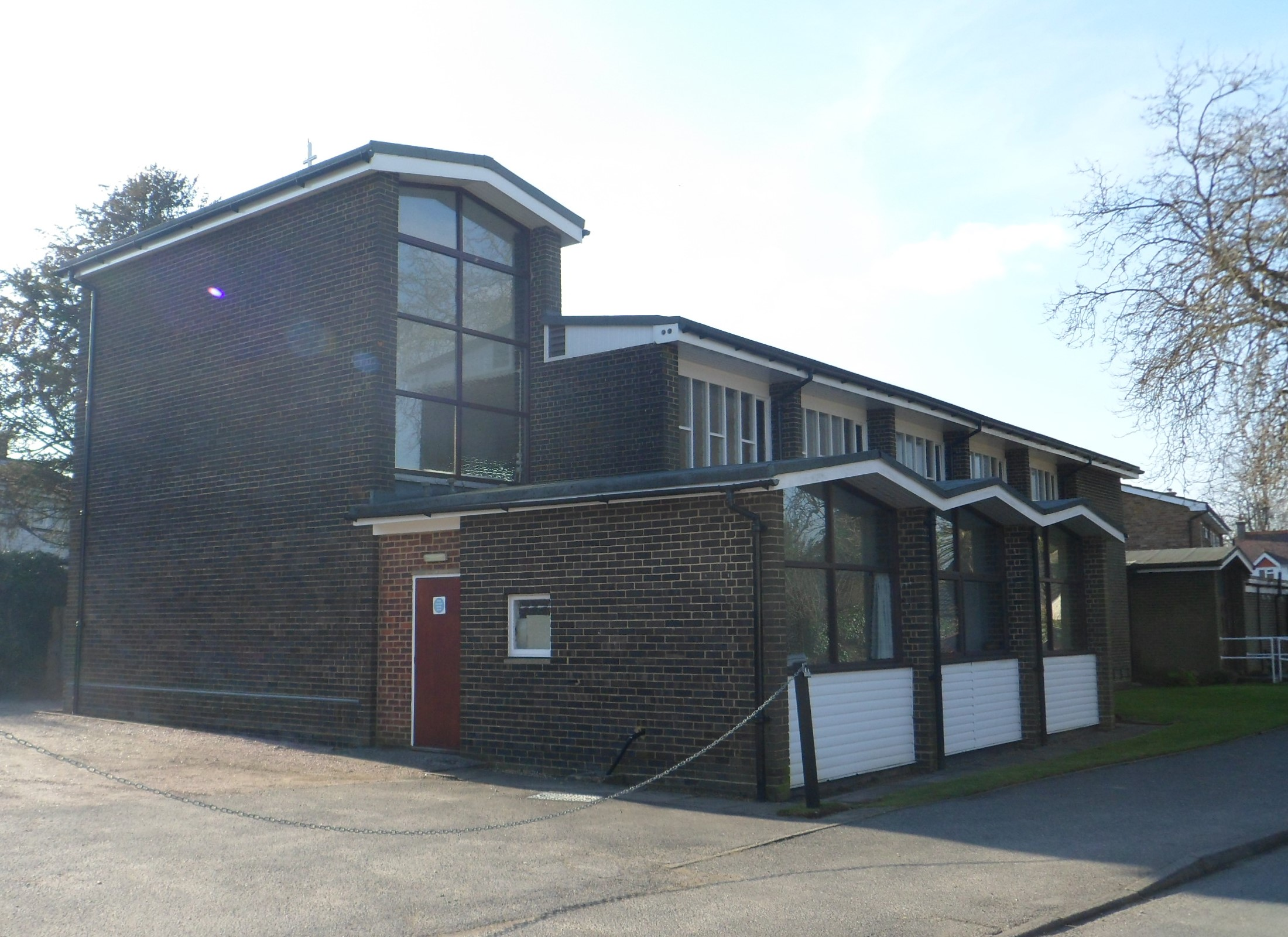
St Ambrose Church, within the same parish

Since 2006, St Ambrose Church in Warlingham has been part of the same parish. It was built from 18 July 1957 to 1958. Before that, Mass was held in an extended building in a house's garden.

All Saints Church has two Sunday Masses, they are at 5:30 pm on Saturday evening and at 11:00 am on Sunday morning. St Ambrose Church has Sunday Mass at 9:00 am on Sunday morning. There are also weekday Masses at 10:00 am on Wednesday at All Saints Church and at 10:00 am on Thursday and Saturday at St Ambrose Church.

== Gallery ==
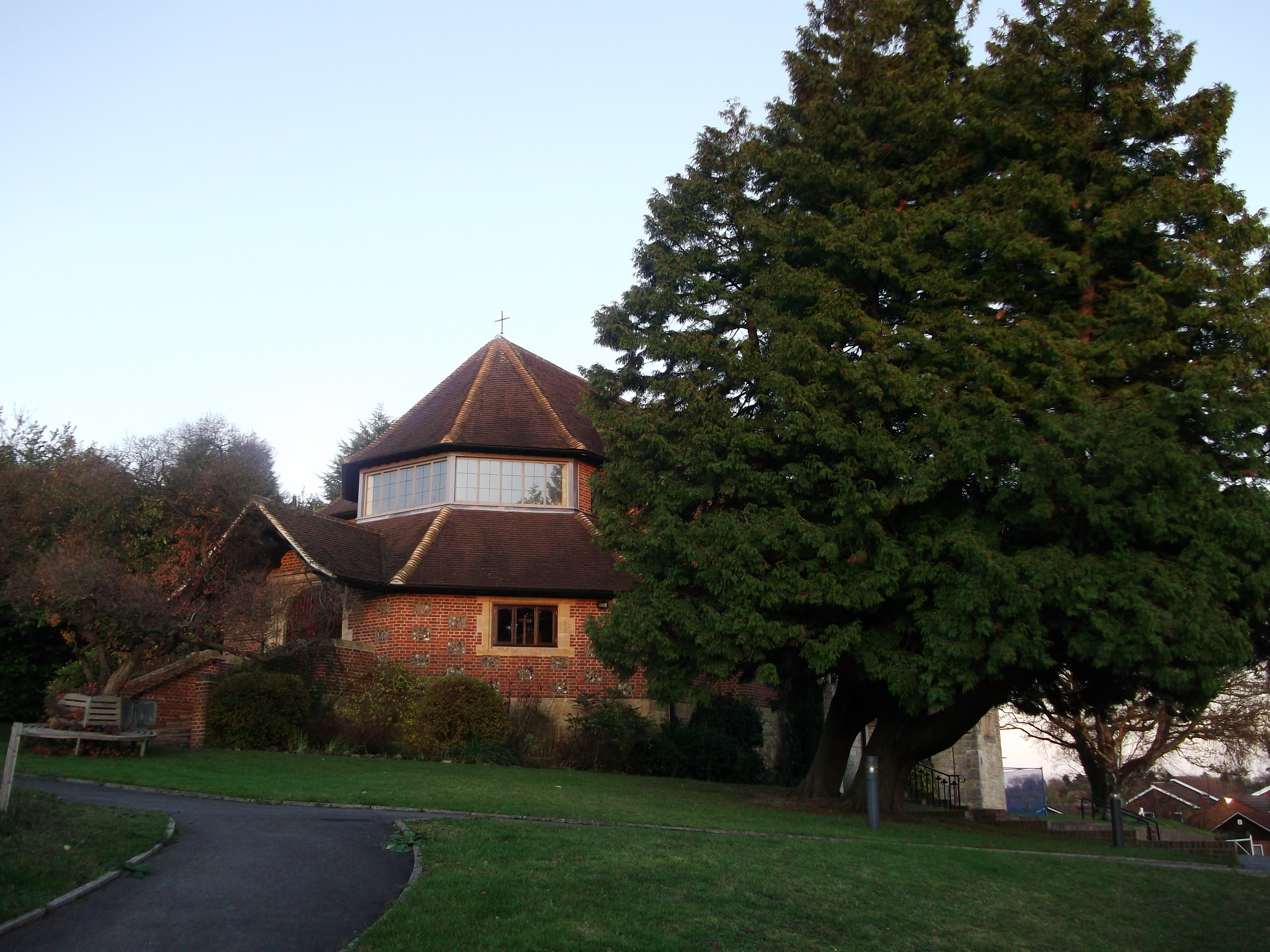
Church entrance

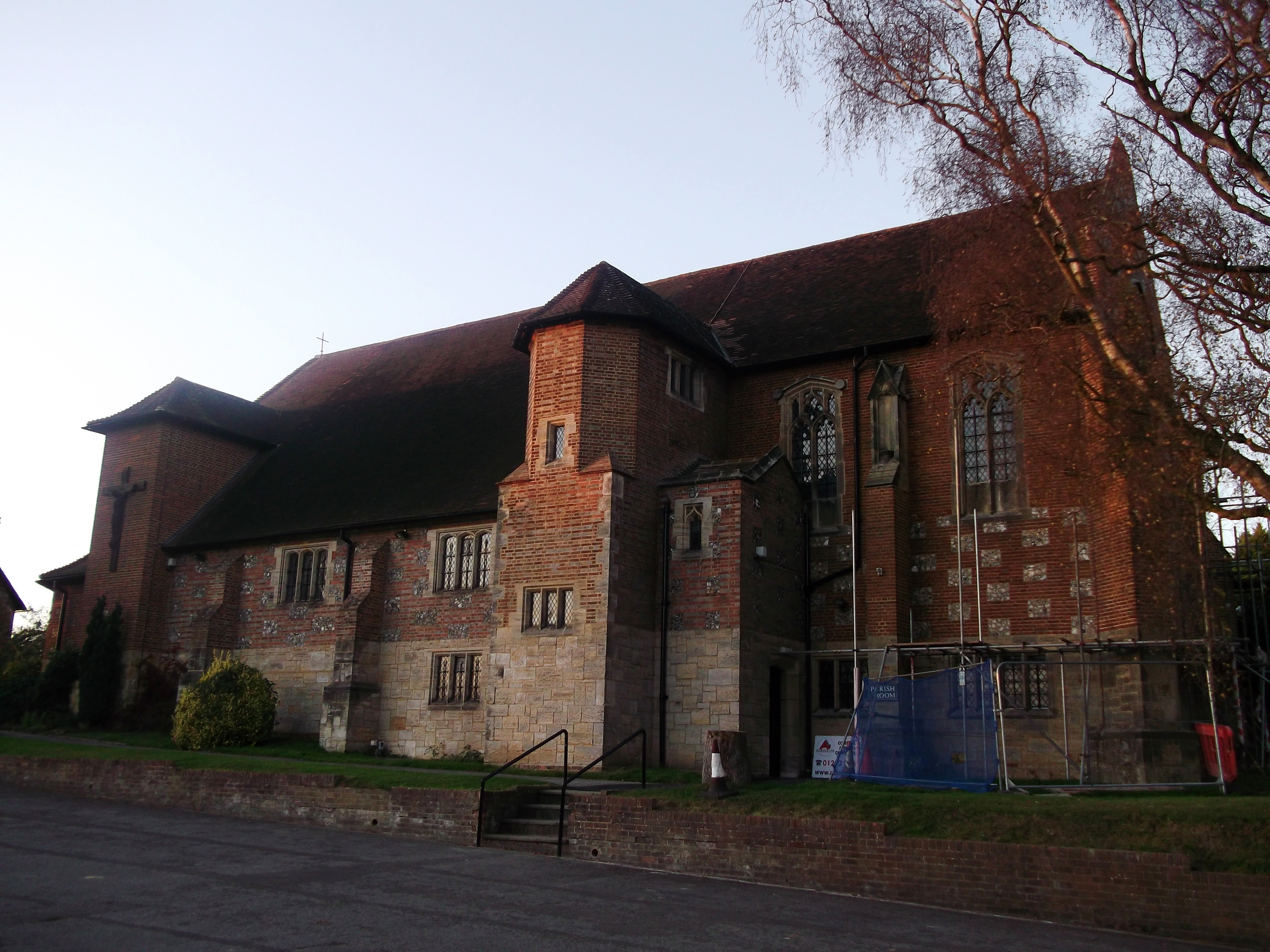
South of the church

== See also ==
- List of places of worship in Tandridge (district)
