= Oxted =

Town and civil parish in Surrey, England

Coordinates: 51.257°N 0.006°W

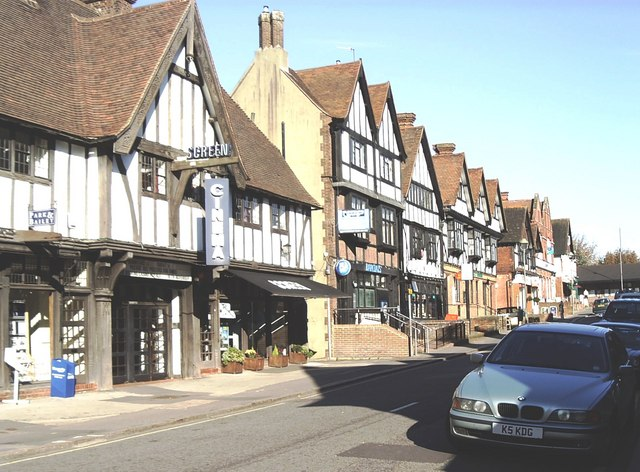
- The timber-framed stucco façades of buildings in Oxted

- Location within Surrey
- Area: 15.15 km^{2} (5.85 sq mi)
- Population: 11,314 (civil parish as of 2011); 13,452 (built-up area)
  - Density: 747/km^{2} (1,930/sq mi)
- OS grid reference: TQ3953
  - London: 17.9 mi (28.8 km)
- Civil parish: Oxted
- District: Tandridge
- Shire county: Surrey
- Region: South East
- Country: England
- Sovereign state: United Kingdom
- Post town: Oxted
- Postcode district: RH8
- Dialling code: 01883
- Police: Surrey
- Fire: Surrey
- Ambulance: South East Coast
- UK Parliament: East Surrey

Oxted is a town and civil parish in the Tandridge district of Surrey, England. It is at the foot of the North Downs, 9 miles (14 km) south-east of Croydon, 9 miles (14 km) west of Sevenoaks, and 9 miles (14 km) north of East Grinstead.

Oxted is a commuter town and Oxted railway station has direct train services to London. Its main developed area is contiguous with the village of Limpsfield. The headwaters of the River Eden unite in the town, east of Titsey Place. The Eden feeds into Kent's longest river, the Medway. Only the southern slope of the North Downs is steep and its towns and farmland form the Vale of Holmesdale, a series of headwaters across Surrey and Kent to separate rivers.

The settlements of Hurst Green and Holland within the civil parish to the south are continuous, and almost wholly residential, areas.

== Toponymy ==
The first written mention of Oxted is from an Anglo-Saxon charter of 862 AD, in which it appears as Acustyde. In the Domesday Book of 1086, the settlement is recorded as Acstede. In later documents, it appears as Akested (12th century), Axsted, Axstude and Ocsted (13th century) and Oxsted (14th century). The name derives from the Old English āc meaning "oak" and stede meaning "place". Oxted is generally agreed to mean "place of oak trees".

Hurst Green is first recorded in the mid-15th century as le Herst in a deed of Edward IV and as Herste grene in 1577. The name is thought to mean "open space by the wood (hurst)". "Holland" appears in 1757 as Hollands and is thought to mean "land by the hill".

== Geography ==
=== Location and topography ===
Oxted is in east Surrey, around 18 mi (29 km) south of central London. It is on the Greenwich Meridian, which passes through Oxted School, Station Road East and East Hill (the A25). The town straddles the London to East Grinstead railway line, which runs roughly north–south through the Parish.

The civil parish extends from the North Downs in the north to the settlement of Holland in the south. It includes Old Oxted and Hurst Green, which are to the west and south of the town respectively. Although the urban area of Limpsfield is contiguous with that of Oxted, the village is part of a separate parish. Much of Oxted and the surrounding area is drained by the headwaters of the River Eden, a tributary of the River Medway. The highest point in the civil parish is at Botley Hill, which at 269.6 m (885 ft) above ordnance datum is the highest point on the North Downs. (Note: Botley Hill is the third highest point in Surrey, after Leith Hill and Gibbet Hill.)

=== Geology ===
The oldest outcrops in the area are of Weald Clay, which comes to the surface in the south of the civil parish. A borehole, dug in 1958, indicated that the clay beneath Hurst Green and Holland is 557 ft (170 m) deep. Gravels deposited by earlier courses of the River Eden and its tributaries, are found above the clay in the same area. A thin band of Atherfield Clay comes to the surface between Hurst Green and Oxted, north of which are the Sandgate Beds, which overlie the Hythe Beds. (Note: In the Oxted area, the Sandgate Beds take the form of glauconitic sand and grey sandy limestone, but to the west of Reigate they are observed as loamy clays containing bands of calcerous sandstone.) The town centre is primarily on the Folkestone Beds, which take the form of a ferruginous quartz-rich sandstone, containing seams of ironstone and mica. To the west of Oxted railway station, there is a thin wash of pebbles, thought to have been deposited by river action during the Pleistocene. To the north of the town, the Chalk of the North Downs has historically been divided into three bands: Lower Chalk, Middle Chalk and Upper Chalk. At Oxted, the middle chalk is around 200 ft (61 m) thick.

== History ==
=== Early history ===
The earliest evidence of human activity in the civil parish is from the Iron Age and finds include a metal brooch dating from the 3rd or 4th centuries BCE. During the Roman period, the roads from London to Lewes and London to Brighton ran either side of Oxted. The name Oxted suggests that the modern settlement was founded in the Anglo-Saxon period and it is possible that St Mary's Church is built on a pre-Christian religious site. From late Saxon times, the area was administered as part of the Tandridge Hundred.

=== Governance ===
Oxted appears in the Domesday Book as Acsted and was held by Eustace II, Count of Boulogne. (Note: Before the Norman conquest, the manor of Oxted was held by Gytha, the mother of King Harold.) Its Domesday assets were: 5 hides; 1 church, 2 mills worth 12s 6d, 20 ploughs, 4 acres (1.6 ha) of meadow, pannage worth 100 hogs. It rendered £14 and 2d from a house in Southwark to its feudal overlords per year.

The early medieval manor of Oxted was centred on Oxted Court Farm, to the south of St Mary's Church. For much of this period, up until the end of the 13th century, it was held by the de Acstede family, who were mesne lords to the Crown. As the Middle Ages progressed, Oxted was broken up into smaller estates. In around 1246, Broadham manor, thought to have been centred on the present day Broadham Green, to the west of Hurst Green, was granted to Battle Abbey. Records from 1312 and 1408 indicate that Broadham manor covered an area greater than 250 acres (100 ha) and that the annual rent from the abbey was 51s. Similarly, in 1283, the "Bursted" or "Birsted" estate was granted in perpetuity to Tandridge Priory, but it is unclear where in the parish this land was located. (Note: Two other 13th-century subinfeudations are known to have taken place in Oxted: Foyle Manor is recorded in 1270 as being held by the de Staffhurst family; Stocketts Manor was held by John atte Stockett in 1299.)

The last male member of the de Acstede family, Roland de Acstede, was summoned to Parliament in 1290, but he died shortly afterwards. His estate was inherited by his five daughters, each of whom was given a share of the land. By 1300, one part of the manor was held by the sisters Clarica and Alina de Acstede, with the remainder by Hugh de Nevile. In 1342, John de Wellesworth, grandson of Roland, sold the de Acstede portion of the manor to Robert de Stangrave and his wife Joan. (Note: Joan de Stangrave was the daughter of Reynold Cobham, 1st Baron Cobham of Sterborough.)

Following the death of Robert de Stangrave in 1344, the former de Acstede portion of the manor of Oxted passed to his wife's family, the Cobhams. and in around 1350, John de Nevile, sold the remainder to them. The Cobham family lived at Starborough Castle near Lingfield and their lands in Oxted were run by a resident steward from Oxted Court Farm. In the 15th century, the manor passed to the Burgh family and, in 1587, Charles Hoskins purchased the "manor and advowson of Oxted" which covered some 605 acres (245 ha). By the mid-17th century, Barrow Green Court appears to have superseded Oxted Court Farm as the manor house. The Hoskins family held Oxted until the death of Susannah Hoskins in 1868, when it was inherited by her aunt, Katherine Master. She passed the manor to her descendants, the Hoskins Master family.

The civil parish of Oxted was formed in 1894. Oxted was part of the Godstone Rural District from 1894 until 1974, when it was combined with the Caterham and Warlingham Urban District to create the Tandridge District.

=== Transport and communications ===
The turnpike road from Wrotham Heath to Godstone passed through the town. The modern-day A25 road divides the original town ("Old Oxted") from "New Oxted", the development that grew up to the north-east after the railway station opened in 1884. A bypass diverting the A25 to the north of Old Oxted was built in the late 1960s.

The first act of Parliament to authorise the construction of a railway through Oxted was granted in July 1865. It authorised the Surrey and Sussex Junction Railway (S&SJR) to build a line from Croydon to Groombridge, where there was to be a junction with the East Grinstead to Tunbridge Wells line. The act was controversial as the S&SJR was sponsored by the London, Brighton and South Coast Railway (LBSCR), but ran into a part of Surrey and East Sussex which was considered South Eastern Railway territory.

In three years, the S&SJR managed to build the 2,267 yd-long (2.073 km) Oxted Tunnel and two shorter tunnels at Riddlesdown and Limpsfield. However, construction became increasingly difficult as a result of the 1866 financial panic caused by failure of Overend, Gurney and Company and, in 1869, there was a riot at Edenbridge because Belgian navvies were being employed to build the line. A second act of Parliament was obtained in 1869 to formally transfer line to the LBSCR, who immediately asked for powers to suspend works. The company paid a penalty of £32,250 and construction ceased immediately. (Note: Construction of the Ouse Valley Railway, which was to have linked Lindfield, Uckfield, Hailsham and Bexhill-on-Sea, was similarly abandoned by the LBSCR in 1868.) No work took place on the unfinished railway line until 1878, when a third act of Parliament authorised the Croydon, Oxted and East Grinstead railway, which would take over construction and be jointly owned by LBSCR and SER. Among the works that were completed by the new company was the iron viaduct between Oxted station and Limpsfield tunnel.

The new line finally opened to passenger traffic in March 1884. Oxted station, originally called Oxted and Limpsfield, was provided with two through platforms and a south-facing bay platform. There was also a freight yard with a south-facing connection to the line. A second station in the parish, Hurst Green Halt opened with line and was replaced by Hurst Green station, to the north, by British Rail in 1961.

The line south from Hurst Green to Eridge was opened in December 1887. A century later, in 1987, Hurst Green Junction signal box closed as part of a resignalling programme for the whole line. Electrification of the line through Oxted to East Grinstead completed July 1987, but the line to Uckfield remains unelectrified.

=== Residential development ===
Although there is thought to have been a religious building on the site of St Mary's Church since before the Norman Conquest, it is unclear whether there was a significant nucleated settlement close to the site. It is possible that much of the population was thinly dispersed throughout the parish until the 12th century.

The settlement of Old Oxted was founded in the 13th and 14th centuries, to the south east of St Mary's Church, centred on a crossroads where the Guildford to Canterbury road met Beadle's Lane (leading to the south) and Brook Hill (leading to London via the ascent of the North Downs). The street plan does not appear to have changed significantly since medieval times, although the surface of the High Street appears to have been lowered at some stage, most likely to reduce the steepness of the gradient as it approaches the stream at its east end. The oldest buildings in the village, 2–6 Godstone Road and The Old Bell pub, date from the 15th and 16th centuries. Several of the houses are thought to have originated as open hall houses, which have since been modified.

The opening of the railway line through Oxted in 1884, stimulated a rapid of phase of development in the parish. Since the line crossed the Guildford to Canterbury Road on an iron viaduct, it was not practical to build a station at this point. The site chosen for the station was to the northeast of Old Oxted and to the east of St Mary's Church.

With the arrival of the railway in 1884 (after many years' delay caused by lack of funds) Oxted boomed in line with London's trade growth around its station, north-east of Old Oxted, and new buildings created "New Oxted". These new buildings were built in the Tudor style, particularly with stucco frontages. All Saints' Catholic Church was built in 1913–1928 designed by Arts and Crafts architect James L. Williams (died 1926, his other work includes Royal School of Needlework, St George's in Sudbury, London (1926–27) and The Pound House in Totteridge (1907). The United Reformed Church's building followed in 1935, which is listed for its coloured glass and Byzantine design by architect Frederick Lawrence.

Development was supported by Charles Hoskins Master through his Barrow Green Estate gifting and selling land parcels for building. In 1908 he gifted land for the Church Room adjacent 42 Church Lane (now demolished). He sold land plots on what became Chichele Road Circa 1912. He gifted the land for Master Park in 1924 for recreation space. In 1926 he gifted land to the Oxted Branch of the British Legion at 42 Church Lane. Road and place names in Oxted such as Barrow Green Road, Chichele Road (named from their ancestral link to Archbishop of Canterbury Henry Chichele), The Hoskins (on the site of the former Hoskins Arms Hotel), Hoskins Road, Hoskins Walk, Master Close and Master Park provide a lasting legacy to the family involvement.

In 2011 The Daily Telegraph listed Oxted as the twentieth richest town in Britain.

=== Oxted in the First World War ===
During the First World War in Oxted, approximately 500 men volunteered and enlisted, of whom 71 were killed or died of wounds received.

=== Oxted in the Second World War ===
During the Second World War, the defence of the Oxted and the surrounding area was coordinated by the 9th Surrey Battalion of the Home Guard. In September 1939, the boys of Haberdashers Aske's School were evacuated to the town and a public Anderson shelter was constructed on Master Park. Two fighter aircraft, a Hawker Hurricane and a Messerschmitt Bf 109 crashed in the civil parish in August 1940.

== National and local government ==
Oxted is in the parliamentary constituency of East Surrey and has been represented at Westminster since May 2019 by Conservative Claire Coutinho.

There is one representative on Surrey County Council, Conservative Cameron McIntosh.

=== Tandridge District Council ===
The district has 43 council seats, representing 18 wards. One councillor is elected to each seat to look after the interests of the district. The balance of the Council in 2024 is formed by 20 councillors from the Residents Alliance (Non Political), 11 Liberal Democrats, 7 Conservative and 5 Independent Group councillors. The residents alliance continues as a minority administration with 20 councillors as 22 Councillors are needed for an overall majority. Catherine Sayer is the current leader.

There are 22 parish councils within Tandridge District.

== Demography and housing ==
Homes (2011 census)
Output area	Detached	Semi-detached	Terraced	Flats and apartments	Caravans/temporary/mobile homes	shared between households
Civil parish	1,427	1,282	911	799	3	1

The average level of accommodation in the region composed of detached houses was 28%, the average that was apartments was 22.6%.

Key statistics (2011 census)
Output area	Population	Households	% Owned outright	% Owned with a loan	hectares
Civil parish	11,314	4,423	36.6%	36.5%	1,515

The proportion of households in the civil parish who owned their home outright compares to the regional average of 35.1%. The proportion who owned their home with a loan compares to the regional average of 32.5%. The remaining % is made up of rented dwellings (plus a negligible % of households living rent-free).

== Culture and community ==
=== Royal British Legion ===
1918 The Oxted Branch of Comrades of The Great War was established. A well built 20 ft x 80 ft Army hut costing £377 was opened in July 1919. The hut was sited on the corner of the then recreation ground owned by Mr Charles Hoskins Master, near Court Farm and St Mary's Church.The branch was one of about 700 in 30 counties UK wide. An organisation created to inaugurate and maintain in a strong, stimulating, united and democratic comradeship all those who have served in any capacity in the Sea, Land, and Air Forces during the Great War, so that neither their efforts nor their interests shall be forgotten or neglected. They called themselves affectionately "Comrades of the Hut".

In May 1921 The British Legion was founded bringing together four similarly minded organisations, creating a unified national voice for ex-servicemen and their families. On 5 July 1921 The Oxted Branch of the Comrades of the Great War became the Oxted Branch of the Royal British Legion. On Thursday 26 May 1943 the Oxted Branch of the Women's Section Branch was formed.

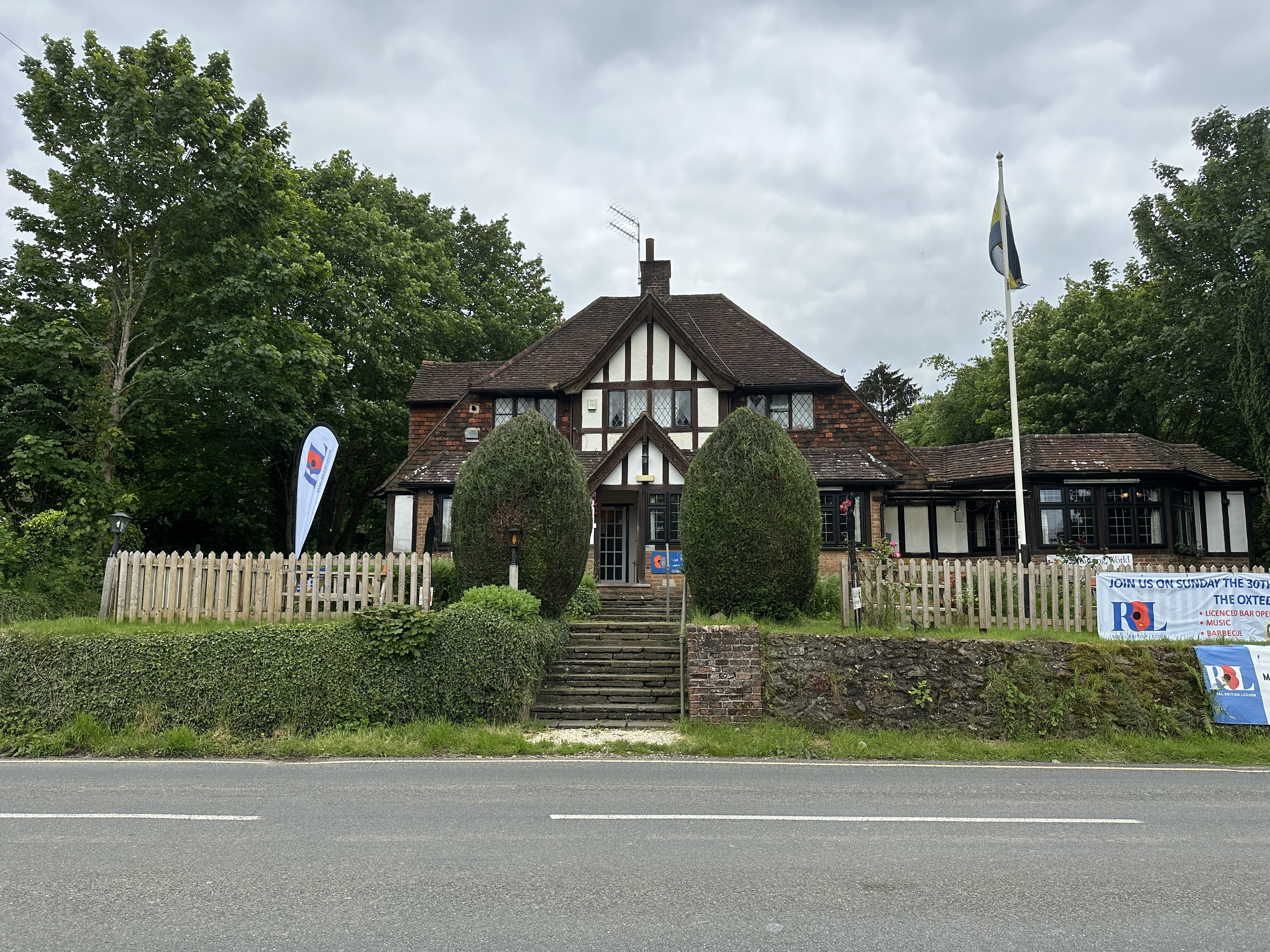
Oxted RBL Branch Clubhouse

In December 1926 the Oxted Branch ( Club ) new building overlooking Master Park was opened by Sir Charles Madden, 1st Baronet. It cost over £2,200. Designed with a ladies room, a writing room and large games room at the rear, a bar and Stewards accommodation above. The architect was Mr A Douglas Robinson A.R.I.B.A. Mr Granville presented a bookcase for the writing room. The land and building upon which the club is built was officially transferred between Charles Hoskins Master and Francis Morton Thrupp on 22 January 1927. The current freehold title SY787642 shows the registered owners as The Royal British Legion, Haig House, 199 Borough High Street, London SE1 1AA.

In 2024 the Branch, the RBL Club and the Women's Section was providing social, community and welfare support activities for ex- military members (Veterans), their families and members of the wider Oxted community. Within the Branch, the provision of 'welfare' services to Veterans has been reinvigorated by Branch Chairman Rob Cogan and it now has a growing 'military' community, with Veterans from World War Two through to those that have served in Iraq and Afghanistan.

=== Band and civic centre ===
Oxted is one of the few Surrey towns to retain a town brass band, Oxted Band, which has been a fixture within the town since 1901. The town became the administrative town of the Tandridge District when it was established in 1974.

=== Pram race ===
Oxted is host to a charity pram race held annually. It was started in 1977 by Eric and Elsie Hallson, who ran it for nearly 20 years before retiring. Entrants wear fancy dress and must push a pram around the two-thirds of a mile course, stopping at each of the seven licensed premises on the way to quaff a drink as quickly as they can. The race ends in Old Oxted high street where the road is closed for the evening and a street party is held.

=== Events in Master Park ===
The park hosts annual events such as that run by the local football/cricket club. Every year there is the Oxted Beer Festival.

=== Barn Theatre ===
The Barn Theatre was conceived as a public hall for the local parishes and was opened on 22 May 1924 by the playwright Harley Granville-Barker. The building, parts of which date from between 1362 and 1433, was originally used as a barn for a sawmill and was moved from Limpsfield to its current site in Blue House Lane. A rehearsal space was constructed to the rear of the theatre in 1931 and a cyclorama was installed in the building in 1968. In 2021, the auditorium had 244 seats. A project to reconfigure the entrance and foyer areas has been built in advance of the theatre's centenary celebrations in 2024.

== Media ==
=== Television ===
The local TV stations are BBC London & ITV London, received from the Crystal Palace transmitter. BBC South East and ITV Meridian can also be received from the Heathfield & Tunbridge Wells TV transmitters.

=== Radio ===
Local radio stations are provided by BBC Radio Surrey, Heart South, Greatest Hits Radio Surrey & North-East Hampshire and Susy Radio that broadcast from its studios in Redhill.

=== News ===
Oxted's local newspapers are the Surrey Advertiser Oxted Local which is a local community magazine. RH8 Magazine which covers the whole of the RH8 postcode area for Oxted

=== Cinema ===
The early use of cinematograph as media entertainment in Oxted took place in the Hoskins Arms Hotel Assembly Rooms to a crowded audience in late 1913. In 1920 the Hoskins Cinema, adjacent the current cinema, nicknamed the Tin Shed due to the corrigated tin roof burnt down after 6 months of use. The new Oxted "Kinema" opened in early 1921 once again located within the grounds of the Hoskins Arms Hotel. 1929 the Plaza opened in 7 Station Road West with the balcony being added in 1936. Independently owned until 2001 when the name was changed to "The Screen", in 2008 Mainline Pictures chain was taken over by Everyman Media Group.

== Transport ==
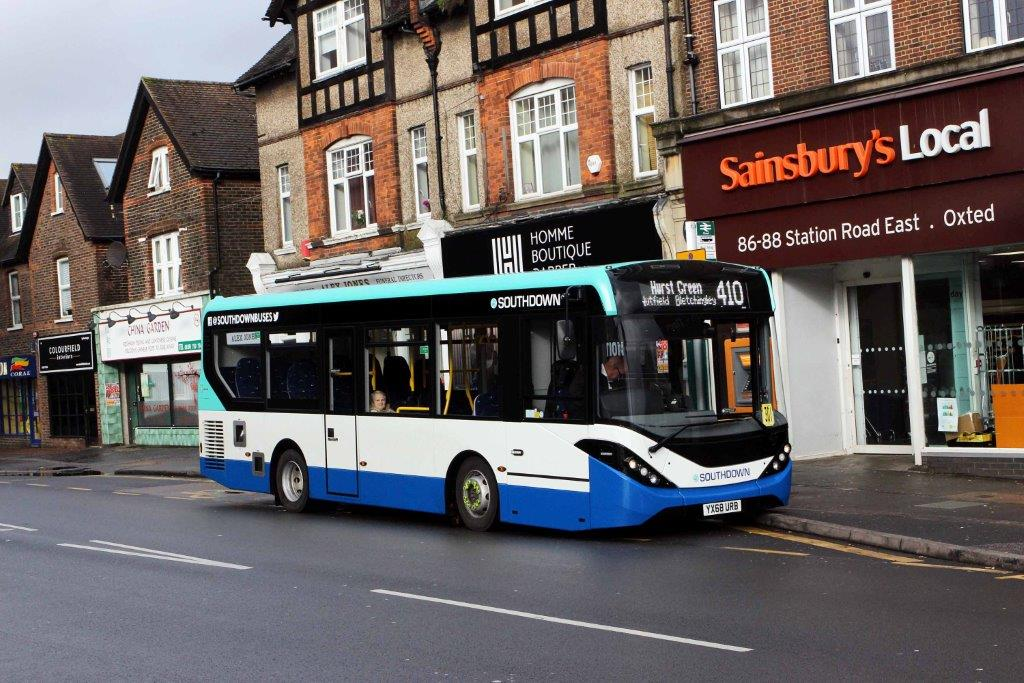
An Alexander Dennis Enviro200 MMC on Southdown Buses route 410 in Oxted Town Centre

The town is served by Oxted railway station and Hurst Green railway station, both on the Oxted Line. Northbound trains run via East Croydon to either London Victoria or London Bridge. Southbound trains run to either Uckfield via Edenbridge Town or to East Grinstead via Lingfield.

The town is also served by Metrobus routes 236, 410, 594 and 595 which provide connections to Westerham, Redhill, Godstone, Edenbridge and East Grinstead.

== Education ==
St Mary's C of E Primary School opened as a National school in Beadles Lane in 1872. Between 1963 and 1974, it moved in stages to its current site in Silkham Road. In 2018, it merged with the adjacent Downs Way School to create a primary school with a total enrolment of 660 pupils. (Note: Downs Way Primary School opened in 1969 and merged with St Mary's C of E Junior School in 2018.)

Hurst Green Infant School opened as a primary school in 1960. In 1993, it became an infants school with a nursery department and since then has educated children aged from two to eight. Holland Junior School opened in 1971 as a middle school. It became a junior school in 1993 and educates pupils aged from eight to eleven.

Oxted School was opened in 1929 and was the first co-educational grammar school in Surrey. Originally called Oxted Secondary School, it opened with 22 pupils, but numbers had grown to 120 by 1932. Following the Second World War, it adopted the name Oxted County School and was renamed to Oxted School in September 1999. In August 1998, a fire destroyed 22 classrooms, the dining hall and the library, but the school reopened for the Autumn Term on time, with many lessons held in temporary buildings. A replacement building, named the Meridian Building, was opened in January 2000. The refurbished arts centre was opened in 2019 by musician Richard Stilgoe as part of the school's 90th anniversary celebrations.

Moor House School and College, in Hurst Green, was founded in 1947 by the neurologist Cecil Worster-Drought to educate children with speech and language impairments. Initially it catered for residential students only, but in 2011 it began to admit day pupils and, a year later, a sixth-form centre was opened. The new residential student village was opened by Sophie, Countess of Wessex in October 2016.

== Places of worship ==
=== St Mary's Church ===
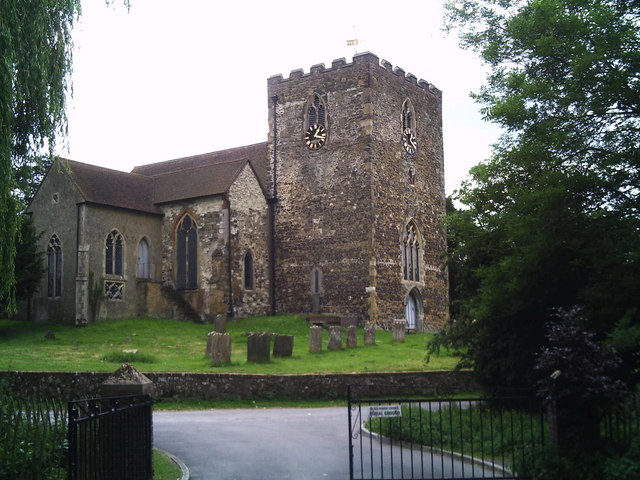
St Mary's Church

A church is mentioned in the entry for Oxted in the Domesday Book and St Mary's Church is thought to be on the same site. It is around 1.5 km (0.93 mi) north of Old Oxted and the circular churchyard suggests a pre-conquest origin. The oldest part of the current church is the tower, which is constructed of Bargate stone with brick battlements and which is thought to date from the 12th century. The octagonal stone font and the chancel date from the 13th century. The aisles, built partly from clunch, were added in the 14th century along with the stained glass panels in the east window, depicting the four Evangelists. The building was damaged by fires following lightning strikes in 1637 and in 1719, and the second incident resulted in the destruction of the ring of bells with the chancel and steeple burned down. In the late 19th and early 20th centuries, new windows, designed by Edward Burne-Jones and Marjorie Kemp, were installed in the aisles and chancel respectively.

=== St John's Church, Hurst Green ===
The foundation stone of St John's Church was laid in July 1912 and was consecrated a year later by the Bishop of Southwark. It was dedicated to John the Evangelist and initially was a daughter church to St Mary's. A new parish was created in 1953. It was designed by John Oldrid Scott in the Gothic Revival style and was built on land owned by Uvedale Lambert, who lived at South Park, Bletchingley. Scott is commemorated in the 3.2 m diameter (10 ft) rose window above the altar, which was given by his family in 1914.

On 1 April 1988, an arson attack took place and the resulting fire destroyed much of the interior. During the subsequent rebuilding, the opportunity was taken to remodel the church, and both the rood screen and altar rails were repositioned to make the chancel more accessible from the nave. The new font cover and two mural panels were designed by the artist John Hayward. A carved oak eagle was presented to the church by the Rev'd Hugh Ford to celebrate its rededication on 1 April 1990.

=== All Saints' Catholic Church ===
The first Catholic Mass to be celebrated in Oxted since the Reformation took place in a garden shed in April 1914. Three months later, a plot of land on Chichele Road had been purchased for a new church from the Barrow Green estate. The building was designed by James Leonard Williams in the neo Gothic style and the foundation stone was laid in August 1914. (Note: James Leonard Williams also designed St George's Catholic Church in Sudbury, which is similar in style to All Saints'.) The first mass took place in the completed crypt in October of the same year, but building work ceased for much of the First World War and the shell of the church was not completed until December 1919.

The church bell dates from 1768, but was recast in 1862 and purchased for All Saints' in 1922. The following year, the stained glass window of St Hedwig, designed by Margaret Agnes Rope was installed in the lady chapel. The church was finally consecrated on 6 July 1927 and the elaborately carved reredos was finished in the same year. The waggon roof, decorated to a design of Geoffrey Fuller Webb, was completed in 1928 and the Stations of the Cross, carved in oak, were installed in 1931. During the Second World War, an incendiary bomb fell on the church, but the fire was extinguished before it could spread to the roof.

=== Church of the Peace of God ===
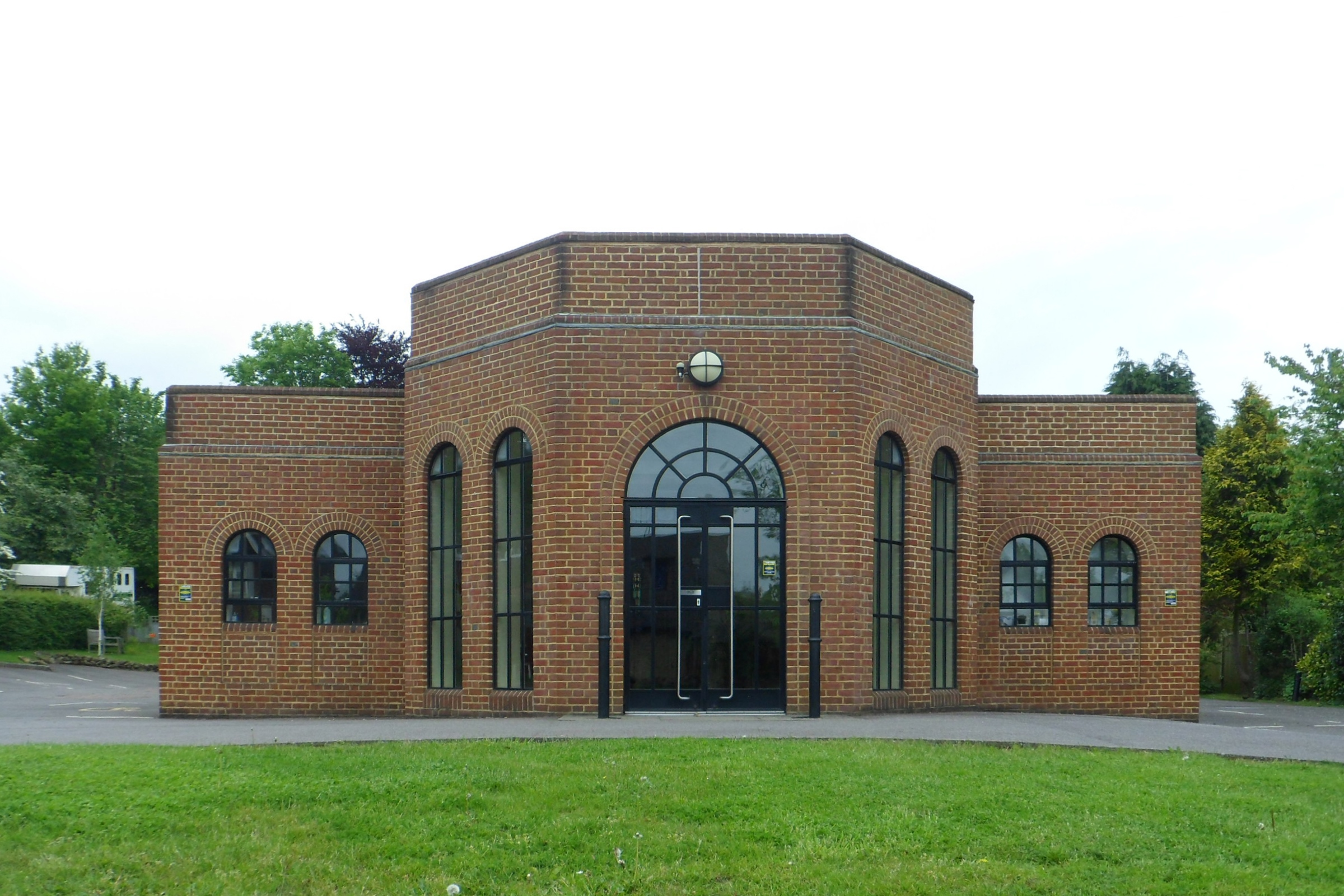
Church of the Peace of God

The first congregational church in Oxted was opened in Station Road East in 1902. By the early 1930s, it had become unable to cope with the number of worshippers and so a new church, named the Church of the Peace of God, was built in 1934–35. It was designed by Frederick Lawrence in the Byzantine style and was constructed in red-brown brick. The church has a cruciform plan, oriented north–south, and has a central square tower. The church underwent considerable alteration in 2000, with the addition of an entrance concourse at the front and a new hall at the rear. The sanctuary was refurbished and the church was rededicated in March 2002.

== Sport ==
=== Leisure Centre ===
Tandridge Leisure Centre was opened in 1990. It was run by the district council until 2000, when management was transferred to a private company, Tandridge Leisure and Culture Trust. Freedom Leisure took over the operation of the centre in May 2018. The centre offers a fitness gym, exercise studio, a 25-metre fitness pool, and a lagoon pool with a 70 m (77 yd) flume slide.

=== Association football ===
Oxted and District Football Club was founded in 1894 and the team have played their home games at Master Park for over a century. Holland Sports F.C. is another football club that is based nearby at Mill Lane, Hurst Green.

=== Cricket ===
The first recorded cricket match including a team from Oxted took place at Caterham in 1840 and the first known matches in Oxted took place in 1855 and 1857 on Broadham Green. Oxted United Cricket Club was formed c. 1870 and ran until 1893. Oxted and Limpsfield Cricket Club was formed November 1889 and the first matches took place following year on Marls Field, much of which later became Master Park. The pavilion on Master Park was constructed by 1906.

=== Field hockey ===
Oxted Hockey Club is a field hockey club that competes in the Men's England Hockey League and the South East Hockey League.

== Parks and open spaces ==
=== Great and Little Earls Woods ===
Covering a total of 9.8 ha (24 acres), the Great and Little Earls Woods are an area of ancient woodland managed by the Woodland Trust. The sites are designated as ancient semi-natural woodland and the dominant tree species are oak and sweet chestnut.

=== Master Park ===
The 4.7 ha (12-acre) Master Park has been used as an outdoor recreation area since before 1900, although formal permission was only granted by the Hoskins Masters family in 1920. Three years later on 17 March 1923 11 acres 3 Rods and 22 Perches of land was given to the Parish by Charles Hoskins Master. The land excluded the triangle of land where the Legion and Scout huts stood adjacent Court Farm near St Mary's Church. A trust was formed to manage the park and local sports teams began to play matches there. The pavilion dates from 1996 and replaced an earlier building constructed in 1967. In 2024 a new brick built pavilion is under construction. When completed it will feature a modern café, sports changing facilities and versatile community rooms. A red oak tree was planted at the park in 1994, to celebrate the centenary of Oxted Parish Council. The children's playground was opened in 2000.

=== Mill Lane Playing Fields, Hurst Green ===
The 6 ha (15-acre) Mill Lane Playing Fields are owned by the District Council and leased by the Holland Sports and Social Association. The facilities include an athletics track and various sports pitches. The pavilion provides changing facilities and a licensed bar. The fields have been legally protected by the charity, Fields in Trust, since 1961 and are designated under the King George V Fields scheme.

== Notable residents ==
- Charles Hoskins Master(1846–1935), brewer and High Sheriff of Surrey, lived at Barrow Green Court.
- Douglas Pyne (1847–1888), Irish nationalist politician, was born and grew up at Oxted Place.
- Commander William Ibbett (1886–1975), submariner, was born in Oxted.
- Beatrice Harrison (1892–1965) cellist, lived at "Foyle Riding", Red Lane, Oxted for much of her life. (Note: The BBC broadcast a concert from Harrison's garden on 19 May 1924. She played cello pieces and was accompanied by the singing of nightingales. The broadcast was heard by over a million listeners and was repeated several times.)
- Albert Houthuesen (1903–1979), artist, lived at Stone Hall, Oxted from 1950 to 1952.
- Michael Tippett (1905–1998), composer, lived in Oxted from 1929 until 1951. (Note: The first concert devoted entirely to Tippett's music, took place at the Barn Theatre on 5 April 1930, conducted by David Moule-Evans.)
- Thomas Ernest Bennett 'Tibby' Clarke (1907–1989), screenwriter, lived at Oakleigh Court, Oxted. (Note: The name of the fictional location of Clarke's Ealing comedy The Titfield Thunderbolt is a portmanteau of Limpsfield and Titsey, two villages to the east of Oxted.)
- Bert Hardy (1913–1995), photographer, lived in Oxted from 1964 until his death.
- Alan Charig (1927–1997), palaeontologist, author and broadcaster, lived in Oxted from 1958 until his death.
- Mohamed Al-Fayed (1929–2023), businessman, lived at Barrow Green Court from the 1970s.
- Sir Henry Cooper (1934–2011), heavyweight boxer, died at Bourne House, Uvedale Road.
- Keir Starmer (b. 1962), Prime Minister of the United Kingdom, grew up in Hurst Green.
- Nicky Forster (b. 1973), football player, grew up in Hurst Green.
- Louise Redknapp (b. 1974), singer, lived in Oxted as a child.
- Laura Trott (b. 1984), MP for Sevenoaks, grew up in the town.
- Ellie Soutter (2000–2018), snowboarder, grew up in Oxted.

== See also ==
- List of places of worship in Tandridge (district)
- List of suffragette bombings#Oxted Station outrage, an incident in which Harold Laski bombed the men's lavatory at Oxted railway station in a gesture of solidarity with the suffragettes.
- Titsey Place

== Bibliography ==
- Alderton, Mary (1999). Oxted 2000: Oxted, Hurst Green and district – A history and guide for the millenium. Oxted: Oxted Parish Council. ISBN 978-0-95-362210-8.
- Alderton, Mary; Bridson, Michael (2004). All Saints' yesterday and today: A history and portrait of the church and parish. Oxted: All Saints' Catholic Church.
- Blatch, Mervyn (1997). The churches of Surrey. Chichester: Phillimore. ISBN 978-1-86-077002-9.
- Bower, Tom (1998). Fayed: The Unauthorized Biography. Macmillan. p. 43. ISBN 978-0-33-374554-0.
- Bristow, Ron G. (2002). A history of Master Park, Oxted, Surrey. Oxted: R. G Bristow. ISBN 978-0-95-421670-2.
- Brown, Stanley (1994). Continuing history of the Barn Theatre, Oxted – from 1948 to the present. Oxted: Barn Theatre.
- Crocker, Glenys (1999). Surrey's Industrial Past (PDF). Guildford: Surrey Industrial History Group. ISBN 978-0-95-239188-3. Archived from the original (PDF) on 3 February 2021.
- Crook, Paul (2000). Surrey Home Guard. Midhurst: Middleton Press. ISBN 1-901-70657-5.
- Dines, HG; Edmunds, FH; Chatwin, CP; Stubblefield, CJ (1933). The geology of the country around Reigate and Dorking : Explanation of one-inch geological sheet 286, new series. London: British Geological Survey. Archived from the original on 2 January 2021.
- Dines, HG; Buchan, S; Holmes, SCA; Bristow, CR; Stubblefield, CJ (1969). The geology of the country around Sevenoaks and Tonbridge : Explanation of one-inch geological sheet 287, new series. London: British Geological Survey. Archived from the original on 7 May 2022.
- Fry, Lewis G., ed. (1932). Oxted, Limpsfield and neighbourhood. Oxted: W. & G. Godwin.
- Gould, David (2003). The Croydon, Oxted & East Grinstead Railway. Usk: Oakwood Press. ISBN 978-0-85-361598-9.
- Gover, J.E.B.; Mawer, A.; Stenton, F.M. (1969). The place-names of Surrey. Cambridge: Cambridge University Press.
- Harrison, Beatrice (1985). Cleveland-Peck, Patricia (ed.). The cello and the nightingales : The autobiography of Beatrice Harrison. London: John Murray. ISBN 0-71-954208-1.
- Hébert, Brian; Packham, Roger (1990). Oxted Cricket Club 1890-1990: A centenary celebration. Oxted: Oxted Cricket Club.
- Malden, H.E., ed. (1911). A History of the County of Surrey. Vol. 4. London: Victoria County History. Archived from the original on 26 November 2021.
- McCarthy, Kathleen (2013). A hundred years in Hurst Green: The story of the church of St John the Evangelist. Hurst Green: Church of St John the Evangelist.
- Mills, A.D. (2003). Oxford Dictionary of British Place Names. Oxford: Oxford University Press. ISBN 978-0-19-852758-9.
- Ogley, Bob (1995). Surrey at war 1939-1945. Brasted Chart: Froglets. ISBN 978-1-87-233765-4.
- Packham, Roger (1987). Oxted in old picture postcards. Vol. 1. Zaltbommel, NL: European Library. ISBN 978-9-02-883493-4.
- Packham, Roger (1990). Oxted in old picture postcards. Vol. 2. Zaltbommel, NL: European Library. ISBN 978-9-02-884920-4.
- Percy, Kay; Gray, Peter, eds. (1975). Oxted Explored. Oxted: Tandridge District Council.
- Tippett, Michael (1991). Those twentieth century blues : An autobiography. London: Hutchinson. ISBN 978-0-09-175307-8.
