= Charles Hoskins Master =

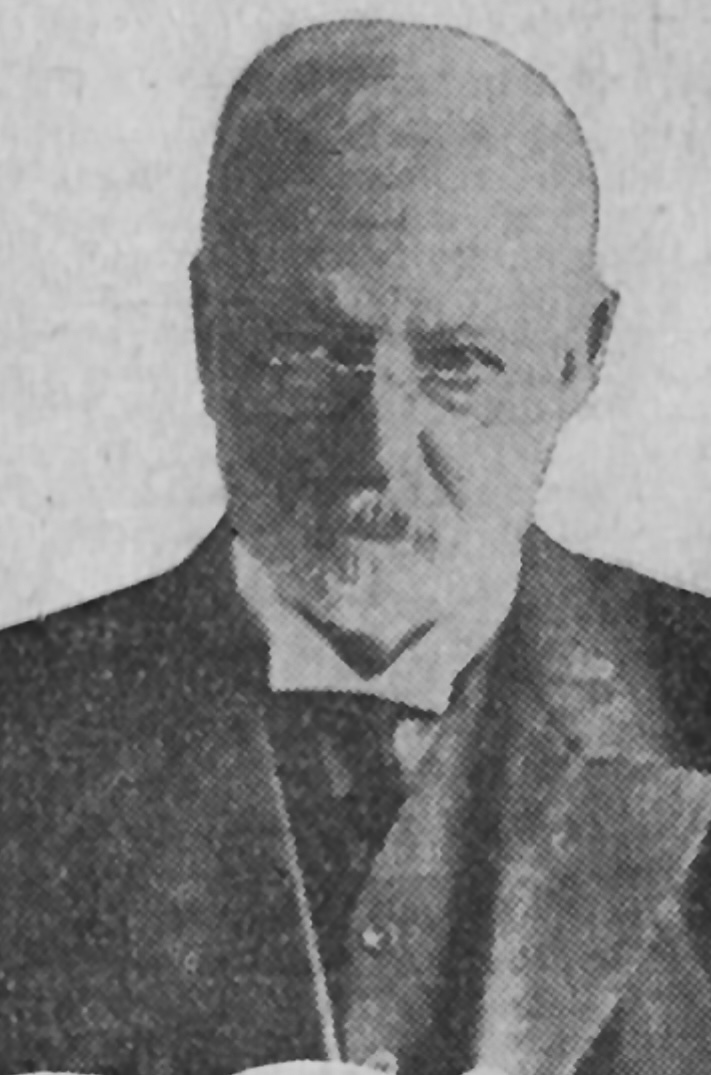
Charles Hoskins Master 1924

Charles Hoskins Master JP DL (1846–1935) was one of the family owners of Barrow Green Court. Chairman of the Friary Brewery, Guildford and High Sheriff of Surrey.

== Family ==
Born at Bilting House, Godmerstham, Kent 24 October 1846. Charles was the eldest son of Charles Hoskins Master 1816-1885 and Emily Borrer 1821–1892. One of thirteen children. He married Amy Morgan Bissett third daughter of General J.J Bissett CB 9 October 1877. Children: They produced five children: Charles Edward Hoskins Master 1878 - 1960. Served as Captain 1/5th Queen's Royal Regiment (West Surrey). Arthur Bisset Streynsham Hoskins Master 1880 - 1939. Served as Lt Commander RN. Herbert Francis Hoskins Master 1882 - 1967. Served as Major, Queen's Royal Regiment (West Surrey). Amy Charlotte Emily Hoskins Master 1885 - 1940. Legh Chichele Hoskins Master 1890 - 1991. Served as Lieutenant Royal Field Artillery .

== Familial Links ==
Ancestral familial names include : Sir William Hoskins 1629-1712. Catherine Hoskins married to William Cavendish, 3rd Duke of Devonshire. Susannah Chicheley daughter of Sarah Chicheley and Rev James Plowden of Ewhurst Hants was descended 12 generations from William Chicheley the brother to Henry the Archbishop of Canterbury 1364 -1443. Susannah married Charles Hoskins 1728-1768 and was therefore the sister in law to Katherine Hoskins the eventual heir to the Barrow Green Estate who married Legh Master and created the Hoskins Master family. Further descendants of four generations led to Charles Hoskins Master, it is this Chichele familial link that provided the naming of his fourth child as Legh Chichele Hoskins Master in 1890. Road and place names in Oxted such as Barrow Green Road, Hoskins Road, Master Close, Chichele Road and Master Park provide a lasting legacy to their family involvement.

== Education ==
Charles was educated at Eton and at Clare College, Cambridge 1867 - 1870. Being accepted at Inner Temple November 1869 as a barrister but never practiced.

== Barrow Green Court ==
Barrow Green Court was built in the early 17th Century on the landed estate of the Hoskins family who had been in ownership since 1587. The family Became Hoskins Master, when in 1753 Legh Master married Katherine Hoskins heir to the Barrow Green Estate. After nearly 210 years of ownership the property was sold in 1963. It was later owned by Mr Al Fayed owner of Harrods.

His Obituary noted that; whilst at Oxted Mr Master took a great interest in local affairs. He was Lord of The Manor of Oxted and patron of the Living. He presented Master Park to the Village. He was a Justice of the Peace and a Deputy-Lieutenant for the county of Surrey from 1900, and in 1901 was High Sheriff. His elder son Charles, in line with family tradition took up residency of Barrow Green Court in 1925. In 1935 Charles was reported to be Lord of the Manor at Barrow Green Court, President and Managing Director of Friary Brewery Company. During the Great War he had commanded the Farnham Company of The Queen's Royal Regiment serving in India.

== Brewery history ==
Charles Hoskins Master purchased the controlling interest in the Friary Brewery, Guildford from Mr Taunton on 1 January 1874. He amalgamated with Holroyd's Brewery of Byfleet and then in 1890 Healy's Brewery to form Friary Holroyd and Healy's Brewery. He became the managing director in Oct 1891. The Brewery was Incorporated in 1895. In 1956 Meux's Brewery merged with Friary, Holroyd and Healy's Breweries Limited, Guildford, Surrey, to form Friary Meux Limited. The brewery went into liquidation in November 1961 and was acquired by Allied Breweries. The brewery was demolished in 1974 and is now the site of The Friary Centre.

== Hoskins Arms Hotel ==
With the encouragement of Mr Hoskins Master using his Brewery business and land holdings, The Hoskins Arms Hotel was built at the lower end of Station Road West and first advertised as a family and commercial hotel in a rising neighbourhood to let by the Friary Brewery in 1886. By 1889 The hotel developed as a hub for social activity, it was being advertised as having over two acres of grounds with Lawn Tennis courts, Bowling Green, Quoits grounds, a Bycle track, Good Stabling with loose boxes for hunters. Social events such as Flower shows, Dinners and Auctions were held there. In 1913 the first cinematographic show was held in the grounds which developed into the first cinema called "The Kinema". Eventually listed as a Friary Meux Pub in 1968 the hotel was demolished and replaced by an unusual hexadecagonal building in 1974. The building was on three levels, and incorporated two bars, a coffee shop, a restaurant and twelve letting rooms. It closed in early 1993, and was later badly damaged by fire. A similarly shaped block of apartments stands on the site.

== Philanthropic gifts ==
In 1908 he gifted the land for the Church Room overlooking Master Park. The building was for the advancement of religion and became a community hub used for readings, meetings, markets and jumble sales until it was demolished in the 1960s. In 1914 he gifted Foxenden Quarry as a green space to Guildford. After the Great War he prompted the brewery shareholders to give Pewley Down to Guildford as a peace thank-offering for the conclusion of the Great War. The deed of conveyance was formally handed to the Mayor of Guildford on 29 July 1920. In 1918, he provided land for a hut on the Oxted recreation Ground for the Comrades of The Great War which later became the Oxted Branch of The Royal British Legion In 1923, he gave Nearly 12 acres to form what became Master Park to the Oxted Parish. He gave Church Organs to St Mary's Oxted, Exbury and Sandgate.

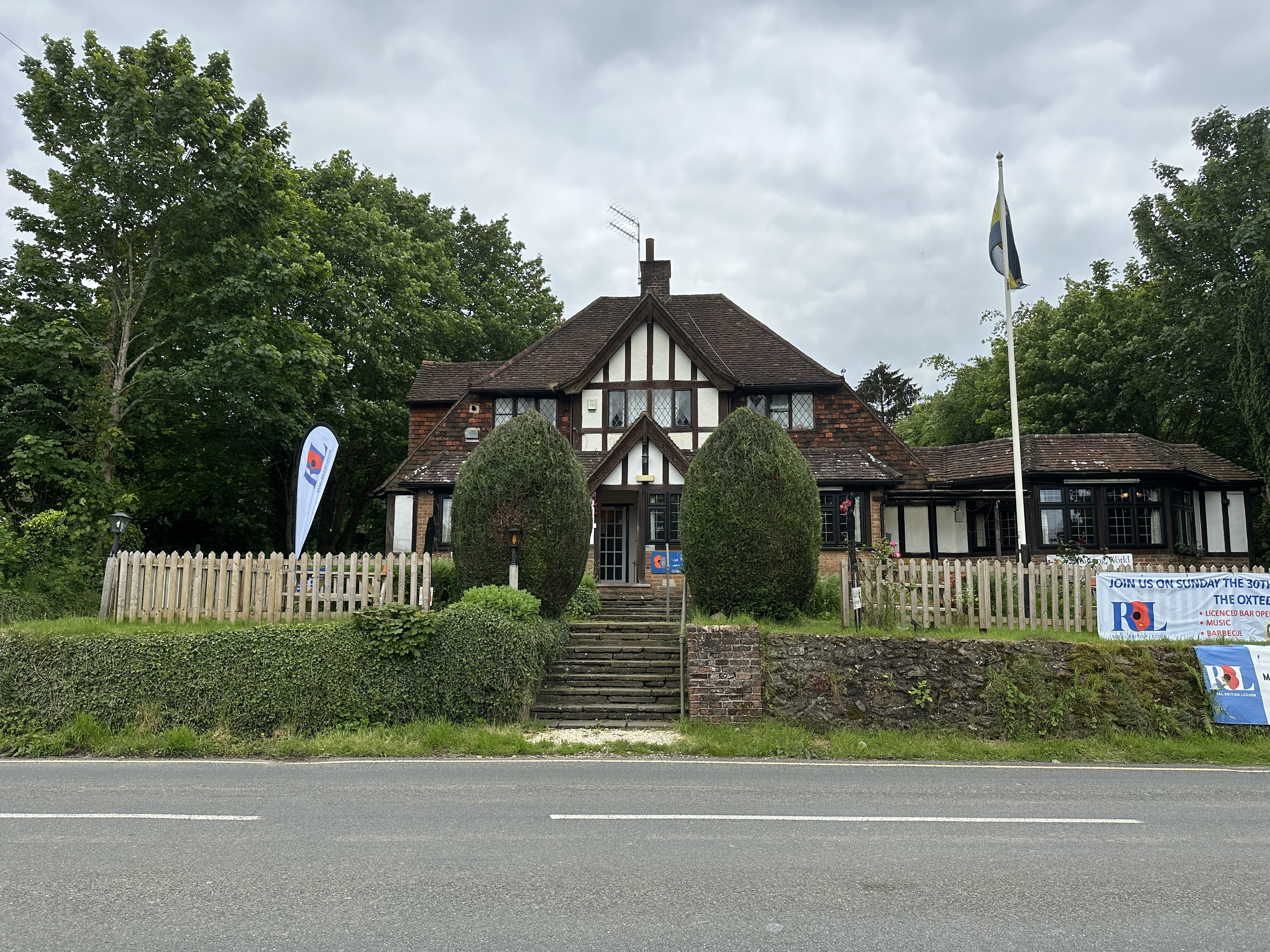
Oxted RBL Branch Clubhouse

In December 1926 the Oxted Branch (Club) new building overlooking Master Park was opened by Sir Charles Madden, 1st Baronet. The land and building upon which the club is built was officially transferred between Charles Hoskins Master and Francis Morton Thrupp on 22 January 1927.

== Death ==
He died at Shakespeare House Sandgate and was buried at St Mary's Church Oxted in the Family tomb.
