= Mike Chaney (BBC executive) =

English editor, broadcast executive and journalist

- Born: Michael Kingsley Chaney; 3 March 1931; North London, England
- Died: 15 March 2024 (aged 93)
- Occupations: Editor; Broadcasting executive; Journalist
- Years active: 1950s–1995
- Children: 7

Michael Kingsley Chaney (3 March 1931 – 15 March 2024) was an English editor, broadcasting executive and journalist for the BBC. He began his carer in journalism in the early 1950s, starting in small regional newspapers before going on to larger publications, the northern editions of the national papers and finishing with the News Chronicle. Chaney was employed by the Nigerian Broadcasting Corporation, the BBC World Service, the BBC Home Service and its replacement BBC Radio 4. He was the launch editor and creator of BBC Radio 1's Newsbeat in 1973 and was editor of BBC Radio 4's early morning flagship news programme Today from 1976 to 1978. Chaney helped launch the BBC's first countywide local station BBC Radio Norfolk that he headed from 1980 to 1982.

== Early life ==
Chaney was born in North London on 3 March 1931. He was the oldest son of the building society manager Stan Chaney and his wife Lily (née Baker). Chaney had a younger brother. He was educated at Oxted Grammar School, Surrey. After his school years were over, Chaney completed his national service in the Royal Air Force. He enrolled on a journalism course at Regent Street Polytechnic (today the University of Westminster).

== Career ==
In the early 1950s, Chaney began his journalistic career, starting out on small regional newspapers in Bolton and Manchester, and moving to larger ones such as The Times, then to the northern editions of the national papers and ending up with the News Chronicle on Fleet Street. He began a two-year teaching assignment in Africa with the Nigerian Broadcasting Corporation in 1957 and this concluded in 1959. Chaney's experience with the broadcaster resulted in his being employed by the BBC World Service. For the next decade, he interspersed newspaper work with publications such as the Daily Herald from around 1962 with his BBC commitments, and he had moved to the BBC Home Service as a producer by 1967, when it was replaced by BBC Radio 4. Chaney worked with a team that was focused on his interests in current affairs, law and politics.

He returned to Fleet Street in 1970 and worked for the tabloid newspaper The Sun. Chaney was persuaded to return to the BBC in 1973 by Ian Trethowan, the corporation's managing director of radio. He was the launch editor of BBC Radio 1's Newsbeat in 1973 that he created order to bring about a populist flavour to the radio station's news coverage. Chaney had instructions to be "faster and slicker than Radio 4" and ensure that the news was more accessible to young Britons. He employed young reporters and producers, mostly from local radio stations, including Richard Skinner, Peter Mayne, Bill Rogers and Laurie Mayer.

In January 1976, Chaney was named the editor of BBC Radio 4's early morning flagship news programme Today. He made an early attempt to ensure the programme was less London-centric, deciding it should be presented from both London and Manchester. John Timpson presented the programme from Broadcasting House and The Guardian's northern editor Brian Redhead hosted from Manchester. Chaney moved six of Today's production staff north to support Redhead. The programme's Saturday edition was axed by BBC Radio 4 controller Ian McIntyre in 1977 and half its broadcast time on weekdays was given to the light entertainment programme Up to the Hour, enraging Chaney. In 1978, Chaney was overthrown in an internal BBC turf war, having being forced to apply for his own job and was rejected. He opted not to take McIntyre to an industrial tribunal but remained in the BBC.

Chaney was put in charge of launching BBC Radio Norfolk, the corporation's first countywide local station and the one with the smallest staff when it was launched in 1980. He travelled to Cumbria to understand the workings of a large rural radio station and was temporary manager of BBC Radio Carlisle in 1979 when Tim Pitt suffered a broken disc. Chaney left the BBC in 1982 following his complaining by telephone to the BBC Radio managing director Aubrey Singer about the poor condition of Radio Norfolk's entire razor blades that were used to cut and edit tape. He moved from Norfolk to Dorset. In November 1984, Chaney was appointed by the University of Southampton as a spokesman. He was made the public relations and information officer for Dorset County Council in March 1989 and began working in the job at the start of May 1989. Chaney left the council in 1994 and established a speech writing business. In retirement, he was active in a successful campaign to save Puddletown Library for the village community when the council pulled funding and campaigned for (and helped to run) a NeighbourCar scheme to provide transport to and from the local surgery.

== Personal life and death ==
He was married three times. Chaney's first marriage was to Diana Emptage, then to Frances Bernard in 1964 and finally Annie Edwards in 1993. He had seven children. Chaney died on 15 March 2024.
