= William Ibbett =

English submariner and BBC Radio broadcaster (1886–1975)

Commander William Ibbett
- Born: 21 June 1886; Oxted, Surrey, England
- Died: 28 June 1975 (aged 89); Burgess Hill, West Sussex, England
- Military career
- Allegiance: United Kingdom
- Branch: Royal Navy
- Rank: Commander
- Other work: Radio presenter

Commander William Ibbett (21 June 1886 – 28 June 1975) was an English submariner, and later a BBC Radio broadcaster.

== Life ==
Ibbett was born in 1886 at Oxted, Surrey, England. After growing up in Wiltshire, he joined the Royal Navy, serving during the First World War, including an attachment to the Russian submarine service, during which the October Revolution occurred, and until 1922, then re-enlisting in the Second World War. Between the wars, his various jobs included tea-planting in Ceylon and work on a whaling ship in the Antarctic.

He appeared in the BBC in the 1930s, and, during the 1950s, appeared regularly on the BBC radio programme Woman's Hour, reminiscing about his career. He was also featured on a 1969 BBC record, Voices From Woman's Hour Past And Present. His radio work was credited simply as "Commander Ibbett".

He appeared as a castaway on the BBC Radio programme Desert Island Discs on 21 October 1957.

He died in June 1975 at the age of 89 in Burgess Hill, West Sussex.
