= Chatley Heath =

Reserve in Surrey, England

Coordinates: 51.31523°N 0.438268°W

Chatley Heath is part of a 336 hectares (1.3 sq mi) reserve including Wisley Common, Ockham and parts of Hatchford in Surrey. It is an area consisting of mixed habitats including heathland, ancient woodland and conifer woodland. On the top of Chatley Heath (formerly known as Breach Hill) is a tower built as part of the Royal Navy Semaphore line.

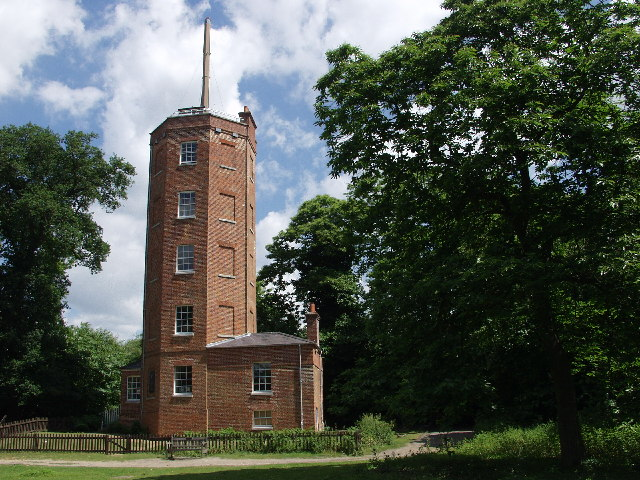
Chatley Heath Semaphore Tower

The octagonal tower was built as part of the Admiralty semaphore chain which operated between 1822 and 1847. It is the best preserved remaining tower and has a working semaphore mast. It is 60 feet (18 m) high with five storeys topped by a parapet built of red brick. It was occupied until 1963, when it was condemned as unfit because of lack of services. It then suffered vandalism and was damaged by fire in 1984. Surrey County Council and the Surrey Historic Buildings Trust restored the tower to mark the centenary of the County Council. However the condition of tower again deteriorated and, at the invitation of the County Council, in 2021 the Landmark Trust converted it into self-catering holiday accommodation. There is public access on certain days.

Next station upwards	Admiralty Semaphore line 1822	Next station downwards
Coopers Hill	Chatley Heath	Pewley Hill
