= Barrow Green Court =

Grade I listed building near Oxted, Surrey, England

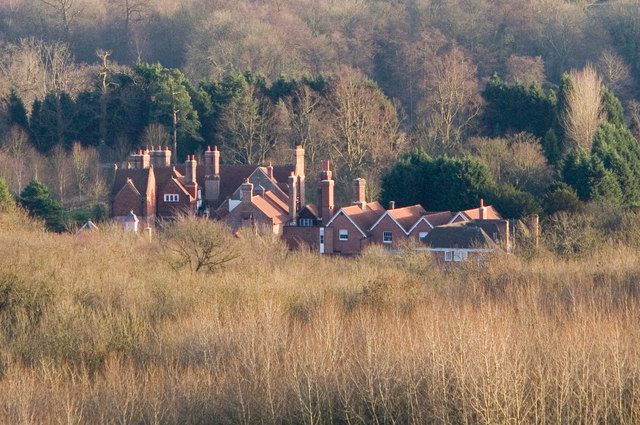
- Barrow Green Court

- Location within Surrey
- 51°15′36″N 0°01′25″W
- Location: Oxted, Surrey
- OS grid reference: TQ 38007 53046

History
- Built: Early 17th century

Listed Building – Grade I
- Official name: Barrow Green Court
- Designated: 11 June 1958
- Reference no.: 1189488

Barrow Green Court is a Grade I listed house near Oxted, Surrey, England.

The house was built on land owned by the Hoskins family since 1587, in the early-17th century, with mid-18th century alterations and 20th-century extensions. It was owned by the Hoskins and Master families for 210 years. Businessman Mohamed Al-Fayed lived there from the 1970s until his death in 2023. Both Fayed and his son Dodi are interred on the estate.
