= Hurst Green railway station =

Railway station in Surrey, England

Coordinates: 51°14′38″N 0°00′14″E

Hurst Green
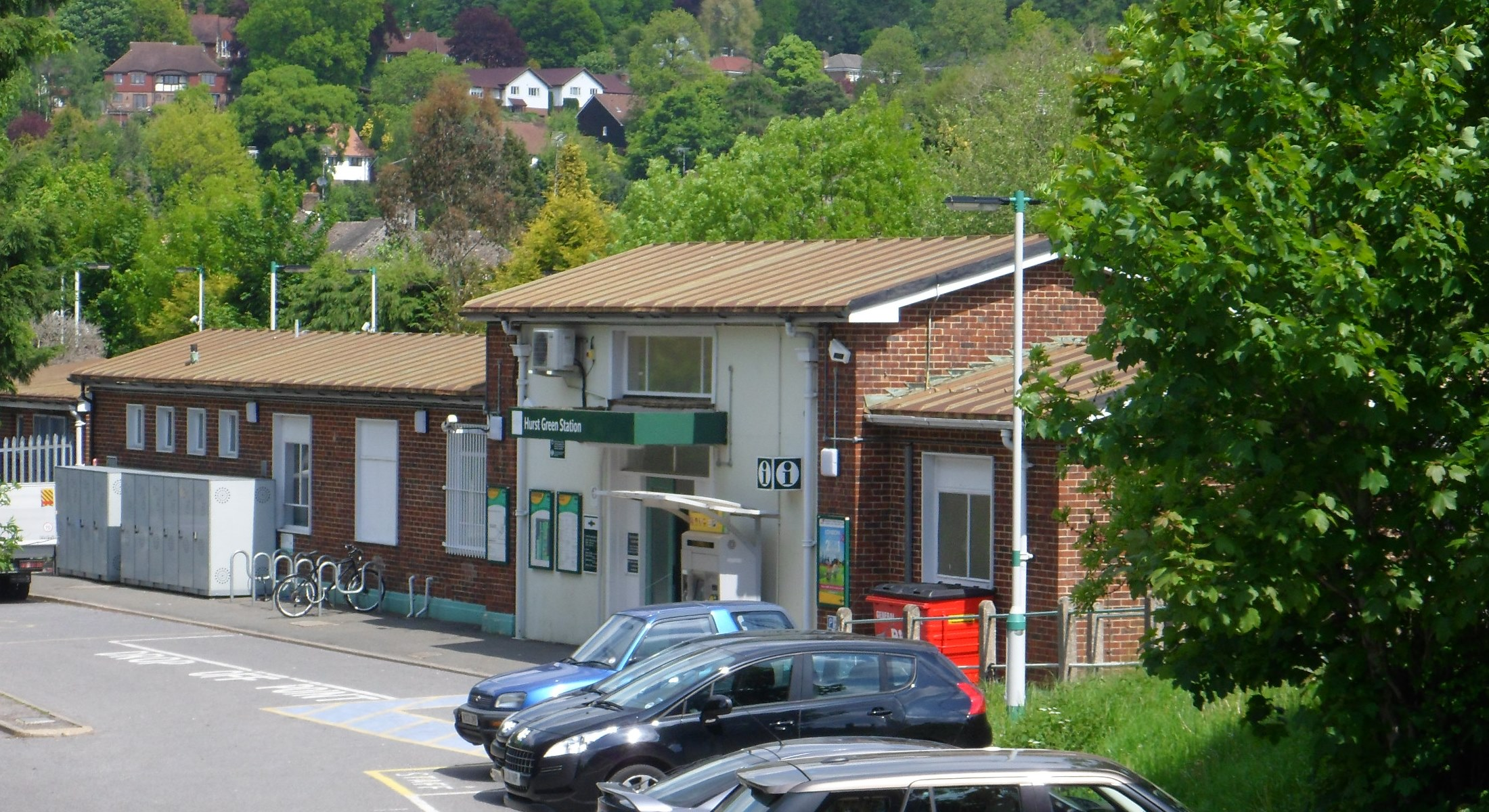
- Main station building in May 2013

General information
- Location: Hurst Green, District of Tandridge; England
- Grid reference: TQ399513
- Managed by: Southern
- Platforms: 2

Other information
- Station code: HUR
- Classification: DfT category E

Key dates
- 1 June 1907: Opened as "Hurst Green Halt"
- 12 June 1961: New station opened to replace halt

Passengers
- 2020/21: ▼0.144 million
- Interchange: ▼10,486
- 2021/22: ▲0.374 million
- Interchange: ▲30,010
- 2022/23: ▲0.446 million
- Interchange: ▲38,850
- 2023/24: ▲0.470 million
- Interchange: ▲40,154
- 2024/25: ▲0.515 million
- Interchange: ▲47,862
Location
Notes
- Passenger statistics from the Office of Rail and Road

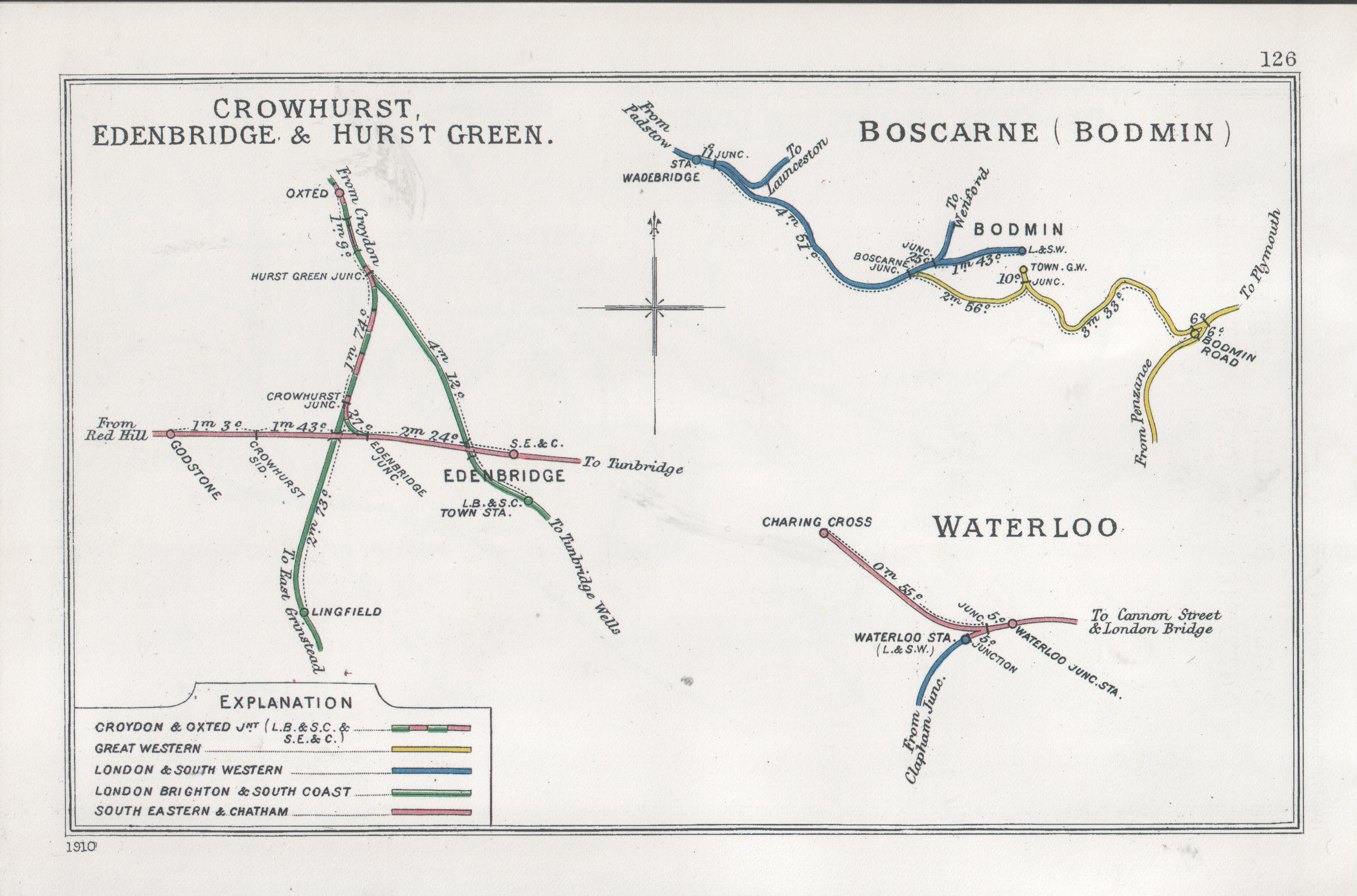
A 1910 Railway Clearing House map of lines around Hurst Green railway station.

Hurst Green railway station is on the Oxted line in southern England and serves the Hurst Green neighbourhood of Oxted in Surrey. It is 21 miles 20 chains (21.25 miles, 34.20 km) from London Bridge. The station is managed by Southern.

== History ==
The Oxted line opened between South Croydon and East Grinstead on 10 March 1884. At the time, the Hurst Green area was lightly populated and no station was provided, although a goods siding was added in 1885 for the use of local businesses. Hurst Green Junction was commissioned on 2 January 1888, when services began on the line to Groombridge and Eridge. "Hurst Green Halt", immediately north of the junction, was opened on 1 July 1907 and was initially served by autotrains worked by D1 class locomotives.

The population of Oxted grew in the mid-1950s, with house building to the south of the town centre. Work to expand and relocate Hurst Green Halt to better serve this area of development began in April 1960. The replacement station, renamed simply "Hurst Green", opened to the north of the original on 12 June 1961. It was provided with 12-carriage platforms to enable East Grinstead trains to be split from or joined to those serving Uckfield, but these operations were carried out at Oxted instead.

Hurst Green Junction signal box closed on 11 July 1987, in connection with the electrification and resignalling of the line between Sanderstead and East Grinstead.

== Facilities ==
Hurst Green station is 21 miles 20 chains (34.2 km) from London Victoria via East Croydon and is managed by Southern. On the London-bound platform is a staffed ticket office (open during most of the day) and a self-service passenger-operated ticket machine is located outside the station on the London-bound side.

== Services ==
Off-peak, all services at Hurst Green are operated by Southern using Class 171 DMUs and Class 377 EMUs. The typical off-peak service in trains per hour is:

- 1 tph to London Victoria (stopping)
- 1 tph to London Bridge (runs non-stop between Oxted and East Croydon)
- 1 tph to East Grinstead
- 1 tph to Uckfield

During the peak hours and on weekends, the service between London Victoria and East Grinstead is increased to 2 tph. On Sundays, northbound services on the Uckfield branch terminate at Oxted instead of London Bridge.

In addition, there are also a number of peak hour Thameslink services between East Grinstead, London Bridge and Bedford, which are operated using Class 700 EMUs.

| Preceding station | National Rail | Following station |
|---|---|---|
| Oxted | Southern Oxted Line East Grinstead Branch | Lingfield |
| Oxted | Thameslink Bedford to East Grinstead Peak Hours Only | Lingfield |
| Oxted | Southern Oxted Line Uckfield Branch | Edenbridge Town |

== Bibliography ==
- Gould, David (2003). The Croydon, Oxted & East Grinstead Railway. Usk: Oakwood Press. ISBN 978-0-85-361598-9.
- Gray, Adrian (1990). South Eastern Railway. Midhurst: Middleton Press. ISBN 978-0-90-652085-7.
- Jackson, Alan A. (1999). The railway in Surrey. Penryn: Atlantic Transport Publishers. ISBN 978-0-90-689990-8.
- Kidner, R.W. (1975) [1972]. The Oxted Line. Tarrant Hinton: Oakwood Press. ISBN 978-0-85-361103-5.
- Mitchell, Vic; Smith, Keith (1995). Croydon (Woodside) to East Grinstead. Midhurst: Middleton Press. ISBN 978-1-87-379348-0.
- "Kent / Sussex / Wessex Routes Sectional Appendix" (PDF). Network Rail. 2009.
