= David Baboulene =

English writer

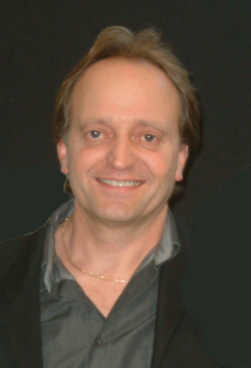
- Born: London, England
- Occupations: Narrative theorist; story consultant; author
- Writing career
- Genres: Story, humour, travel
- Website: www.baboulene.com

David Baboulene, is an English academic, story consultant, and author of humorous travel books, children's illustrated stories and academic works on story theory.

== Life ==
David Baboulene was born in Kenley, to the south of London, UK. He attended Oxted School in Oxted, Surrey, but dropped out at the age of 16 to undertake an apprenticeship in the British Merchant Navy. His experiences from his work on cargo ships are documented in his books Ocean Boulevard and Jumping Ships, which recount his adventures around the world.

In 2003, Baboulene won the Euroscript Film Story competition – a Europe-wide competition sponsored by the European Film Commission. The first prize was to work with a professional scriptwriter to develop the story into a full screenplay. His interest in story theory developed from this point, leading ultimately to a PhD for his research into Narrative Theory from the University of Brighton in 2017.

Baboulene has subsequently written four practical academic works on Story Theory: The Story Book (2010), Story Theory (2014), Story in Mind (2019), and The Primary Colours of Story (2020),

== Bibliography ==
=== Travel books ===
- Baboulene, David (2009). Jumping Ships (1st ed.). Summersdale Media Group. pp. 320 pp. ISBN 978-1-84024-591-2.
- Baboulene, David (2007). Ocean Boulevard (1st ed.). Summersdale Media Group. pp. 320 pp. ISBN 978-1-84024-590-5.
- Baboulene, David (2002). The Blue Road (1st ed.). Summersdale Media Group. pp. 320 pp. ISBN 978-1-84024-234-8.

=== Children's books (illustrated by Kelly Chapman) ===
- Baboulene, David (2008). Kepple the Kite (1st ed.). DreamEngine Media Ltd. pp. 32 pp. ISBN 978-0-9557089-0-9.
- Baboulene, David (2011). Oopsie – I Forgot! (1st ed.). DreamEngine Media Ltd. pp. 32 pp. ISBN 978-0-9557089-1-6.

=== Story theory ===
- Baboulene, David (2010). The Story Book – Guidance for writers to story creation, optimisation and problem resolution (1st ed.). DreamEngine Media Ltd. pp. 256 pp. ISBN 978-0-9557089-2-3.
- Baboulene, David (2014). Story Theory – the psychological and linguistic foundations to how stories work (1st ed.). DreamEngine Media Ltd. pp. 186 pp.
- Baboulene, David; et al. (2019). Narrative and metaphor in education: Look both ways (Contributing author). Routledge, New York. pp. 32–45. ISBN 978-1-1383108-7-2.
- Baboulene, David (2019). Story in Mind: A constructivist narratology (1st ed.). DreamEngine Media Ltd. pp. 200 pp. ISBN 978-0-9557089-7-8.
- Baboulene, David (2020). The Primary Colours of Story (1st ed.). DreamEngine Media Ltd. pp. 186 pp.
