= Pewley Down =

Park and nature reserve in Guildford

Coordinates: 51.230°N 0.558°W

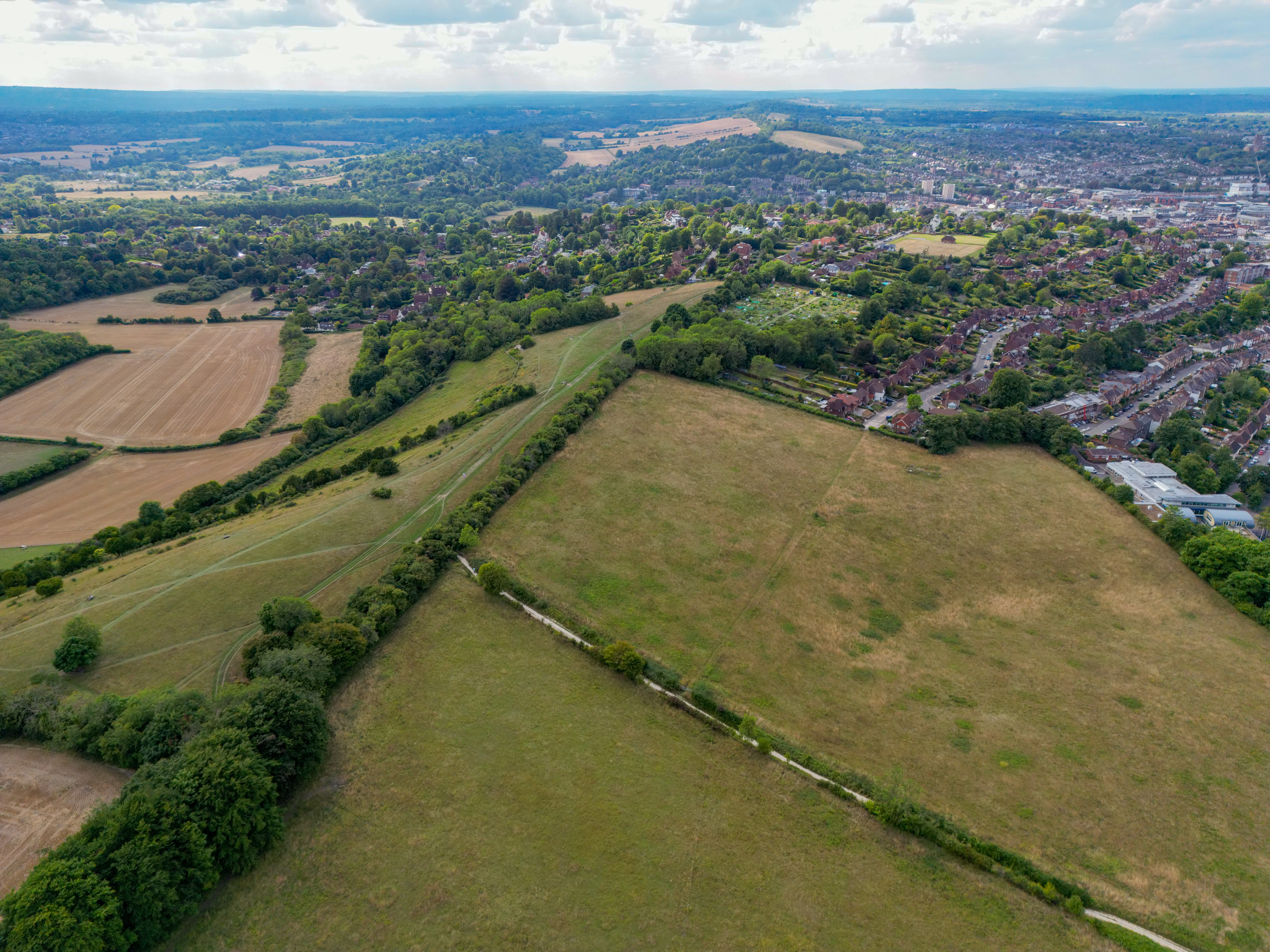
- Aerial view of Pewley Down, with Pewley Down Meadows in the foreground
- Interactive map of Pewley Down
- Type: Local Nature Reserve
- Location: Guildford, Surrey
- OS grid: TQ 008 489
- Area: 9.5 hectares (23 acres)
- Created: July 29, 1920
- Manager: Guildford Borough Council

Pewley Down is a 9.5-hectare (23-acre) Local Nature Reserve on the southern outskirts of Guildford in Surrey, adjacent to Pewley Hill. It is owned and managed by Guildford Borough Council. The site is on a hill offering views south to St Martha's Hill, Chantry Wood, and beyond.

== History ==
Pewley Down was owned by the Austens, a family of local merchants, from the early 16th century. Following the death of Robert Godwin-Austen in 1884, it passed to Henry Haversham Godwin-Austen. Partly as a result of the Agricultural Depression, his properties struggled financially, and Henry was declared bankrupt in 1898. In 1907, the bankruptcy trustees began to construct a road across Pewley Down in preparation for dividing the land into plots for housebuilding.

After local protest, Pewley Down was purchased by the Friary, Holroyd & Healy's Brewery. On 29 July 1920 it was donated to the town of Guildford to commemorate the conclusion of the First World War, with the condition that it be "preserved for time immemorial as a playground for the people of Guildford". The deed of conveyance was formally handed over to the mayor by Mr Charles Hoskins Master, the chairman of directors. The site was designated as a local nature reserve in July 2006. An adjacent set of fields, now known as Pewley Down Meadows, were purchased by the community in 2021 and are managed by the Surrey Wildlife Trust as a local nature reserve.

== Nature ==
This site is an example of chalk downland, and has several species of rare flowering plants, including pyramidal and Man orchids.

Invertebrates include 26 species of butterflies, including the small blue and chalkhill blue, and 119 species of bees, wasps and ants.
