= Pewley Hill =

Hill in Surrey, England

Coordinates: 51.2332°N 0.5658°W

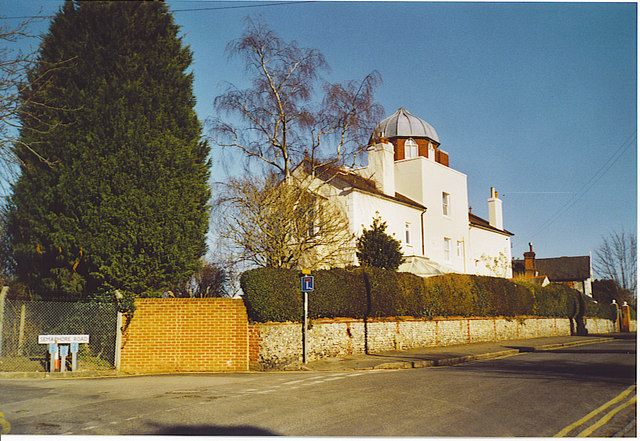
Semaphore House on Pewley Hill

Pewley Hill is a hill, and a street so named, near Guildford in England. It links to the open space at Pewley Down and was used as the site of a semaphore station and a defensive fort in the nineteenth century. In the late 19th and early 20th centuries much of the land was built upon.

Pewley Hill was part of lands granted by William the Conqueror to the Testard family. It takes its name from the de-la-Puille family who acquired it from Richard Testard in 1255. The Puille family name was also reflected in the manor of Poyle and the Poyle Charity.

An Admiralty semaphore station was built at Pewley Hill in 1822 forming part of the London-Portsmouth semaphore line. The building remains, with a cupola on top which was added after the semaphore went out of use. In 1866 Guildford Corporation built a new reservoir at the top of Pewley Hill. Pewley Hill Fort (or Mobilization Centre) was built in around 1890 as part of the London Defence Positions scheme, running from Guildford along the North Downs to Fort Halstead, up the Darent Valley to Dartford, and north of the Thames to North Weald. The scheme was abandoned in 1906.

Next station upwards	Admiralty Semaphore line 1822	Next station downwards
Chatley Heath	Pewley Hill	Bannicle Hill
