= Oxenford Farm =

Coordinates: 51.1807°N 0.6682°W

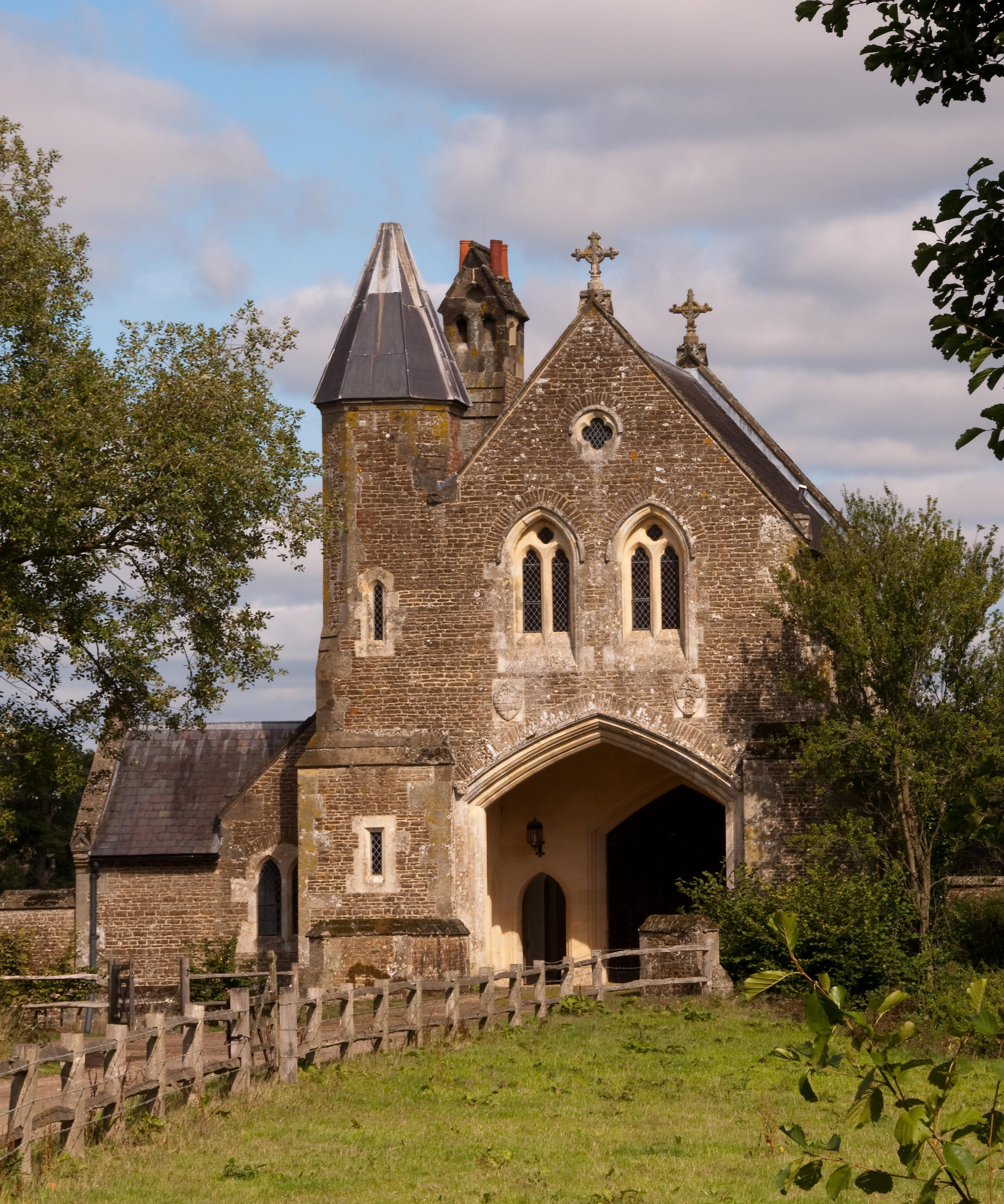
Oxenford Gate Lodge in 2013

Oxenford Farm is a former abbey farm, a dependency of Waverley Abbey in the civil parish of Witley, Surrey, England, with several listed buildings around a courtyard, including three by Augustus Pugin.

== Buildings ==
The three highest listed buildings, at Grade II*, are Gothic Revival buildings designed by Palace of Westminster-famed Gothic Revivalist Augustus Pugin.

- Oxenford Gate Lodge - Grade II* 1843-44 by Pugin; approached over a bridge; includes octagonal turret, gable crucifix (cross) and bellcote.
- Granary and Farm Buildings at Oxenford Farm - Grade II* 1843 by Pugin; buttressed and primarily built from ashlar dressed stone.
- Barn at Oxenford Grange - Grade II*; buttressed and primarily built from ashlar dressed stone.
- Oxenford Grange Farm House - Grade II possibly on medieval foundations but 17th, 19th and 20th century brick dressed sandstone rubble.
- Oxenford Lodge - Grade II 1763 by William Chambers also for the estate of Viscount Middleton

=== Remains of Oxenford Grange ===
- Remains of Oxenford Grange - Grade II the walls survive; date uncertain, listed as reputed to be remains of this dependency of Waverley Abbey; consistent with 13-14th gothic architecture; destroyed before 1775 when Peper Harow House was erected instead of an intended house on this site for Viscount Middleton.

== History ==
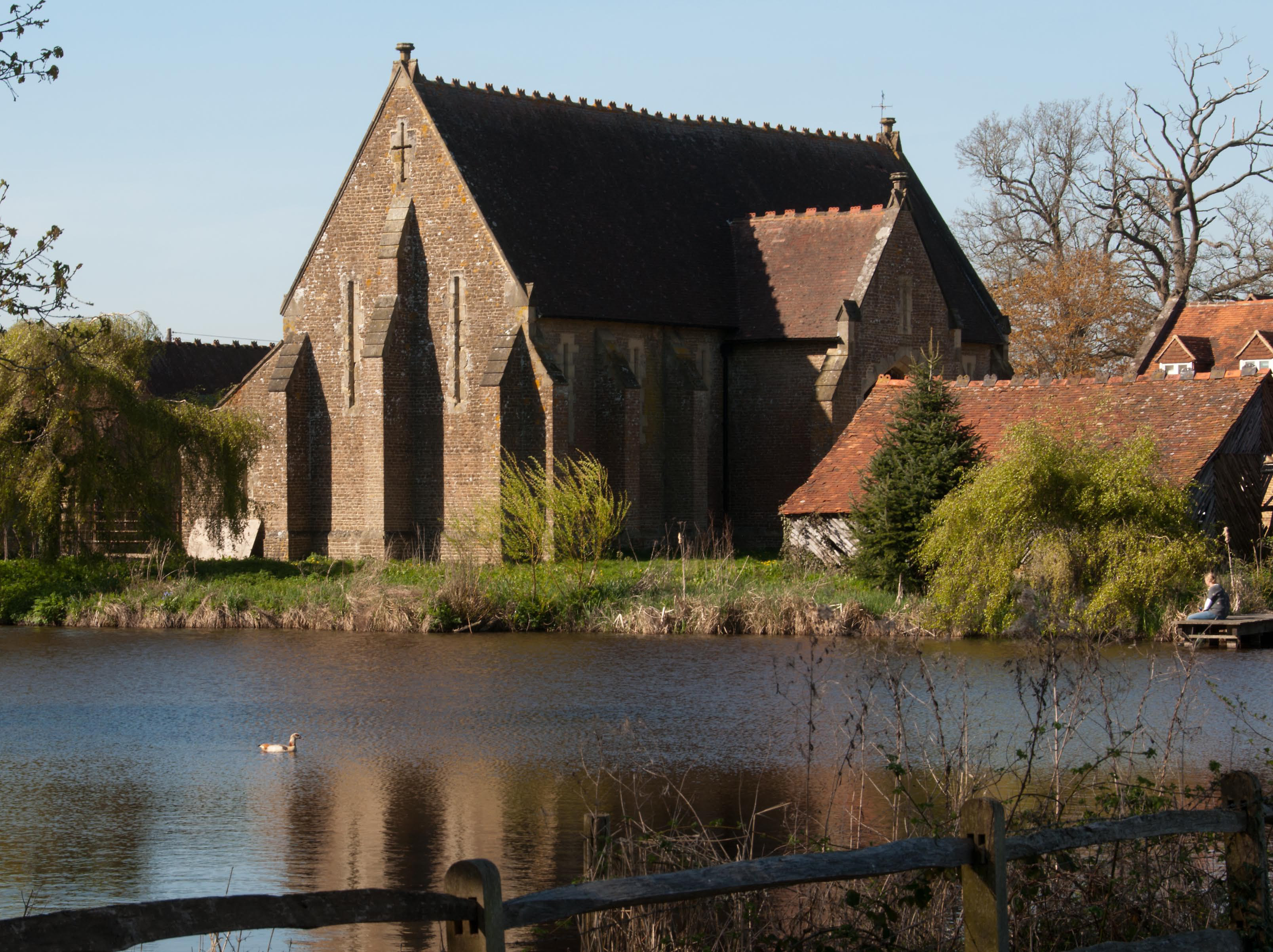
Barn at Oxenford Grange

Richer de Aquila (L'Aigle) granted Oxenford to Waverley Abbey before 1147. It was a Cistercian monastery farming community for Waverley Abbey until 1536 when Oxenford was granted to Sir William Fitz William during the Dissolution of the Monasteries, when it was valued at £4 13s. 4d.

The buildings are in recent times within the nearby Peper Harow estate.

== Popular culture ==
The buildings and their surrounding grounds, near small woods less than 100 metres away to the south and west, were used as a location for the 2010 film Robin Hood.
