= Oxted School =

Location
- Bluehouse Lane; Oxted, Surrey, RH8 0AB; England; 51.2599°N 0.0015°W

Information
- Type: Academy
- Motto: Fortiter Fideliter
- Established: 1929
- Local authority: Surrey County Council
- Department for Education URN: 142315 Tables
- Ofsted: Reports
- Principal: Maurice Devenney
- Gender: Coeducational
- Age: 11 to 18
- Enrolment: 1,906
- Houses: Detillens; Foyles; Grants; Stocketts; Tenchleys
- Academy trust: Howard Partnership Trust
- Website: www.oxtedschool.org

Oxted School is a coeducational secondary school and sixth form located in the English town of Oxted, Surrey. It was opened in 1929 as the first mixed grammar school in Surrey and now has over 1,900 pupils aged 11–18 (Years 7-13).

== History ==
Oxted County School, as named until 1999 when it became known as Oxted School, was built in 1929 at the cost of £35,000. In its first term it had only 22 pupils but this increased to 120 after two years. It was originally designed to grow to 250 pupils. Now, as of 2019 it has well in excess of 1,900 pupils.

The school was the first mixed grammar school in Surrey when it opened. The sexes were strictly segregated and they had separate staircases, playgrounds and had to sit at separate sides of the classroom in lessons. As a punishment, girls would have to write lines; boys were caned by the headmaster.

In September 2013, following the departure of Mr Guy Nelson as headteacher, the chairman of the school's governing body announced new leadership arrangements for the school. Mrs Rhona Barnfield, at the time, Executive Head of the Howard Partnership, an Academy Chain in Surrey comprising Howard of Effingham School near Leatherhead and Thomas Knyvett College at Ashford, was appointed Executive Head of Oxted School. Mrs Nicola Euridge, also from the Howard Partnership, was appointed Head of School, and made responsible for running the school on a day-to-day basis. The Howard Partnership forms part of the Howard Partnership Education Trust, to which is also linked the Howard Partnership Trust.

In September 2015 the school converted to academy status sponsored by the Howard Partnership.

== ODD Youth Theatre ==
The school has a performing arts department and its own theatre company called The Odd Youth Theatre. Having previously been known as The Performing Arts Society, the new name Odd Youth Theatre (Oxted Dance and Drama) was adopted when the company took Dancing In The Dark, adapted from the novel by Joan Barfoot, to The Edinburgh Fringe Festival in 1992. The company returned to Edinburgh in 1999 with two productions, Find Me and Molly. Recent productions include Under Milk Wood, Oliver, Into the Woods, Guys and Dolls, Sleeping Beauty and West Side Story.

== Buildings ==
1. The original building of 1929
2. The 1951 extension of the original building
3. The PE Block (1960s)
4. The Art Block (1987)
5. The Drama Studio (1991)
6. The Science Block (1993)
7. The Design and Technology Block (1997)
8. The Meridian Building (1999/2000). This replaced the destroyed 1960s Humanities Block, see below.
9. A few hut classrooms constructed over the years
10. The Eden Building (Mathematics) completed in summer 2008.

== The Fire in 1998 ==
On 16 August 1998 former students of the school allegedly set fire to bins outside the Humanities Block, resulting in a fire that destroyed the entire building. This contained 22 classrooms, library, canteen, thousands of books and 125 computers.

The school reopened as usual in September with temporary hut classrooms. Some of these huts still remain and have been refurbished in 2017 and in 2018.

The replacement building is called The Meridian Building as The Greenwich Meridian runs directly through it. It contains 23 classrooms, library and canteen. It was opened officially in April 2000 by the former headteacher, Roger Coles.

== Notable former pupils ==
- David Baboulene, author, academic and story consultant
- Mike Chaney, editor, broadcasting executive and journalist
- Clement Crisp, dance critic
- Tommy Hill, winner of the 2011 British Superbike Championship season
- Omari Hutchinson, Chelsea F.C. footballer
- Ian Pearce, professional footballer
- Stacie Powell, Olympic diver in 2008 and 2012
- Vicky Spratt, housing journalist
- Rob Street, footballer
- Alison Streeter, record-holding swimmer, International Swimming Hall of Fame
- Lauren Sullivan, MP for Gravesham
- Laura Trott, Conservative MP for Sevenoaks
