= Horsley Priory (Surrey) =

Horsley Priory was a Benedictine priory of nuns in Surrey. It is thought to relate to the priory attested at "Horslege" "in the time of Richard I or Queen Joan" in the monastic catalogue attributed to Gervase of Canterbury. Later historians stated that "there is no trace of such thing, unless it may be looked for at Rowbarnes".
