= Tandridge Priory =

Monastery information
- Order: Augustinians
- Established: 1189-99 (as hospital) refounded as priory: 1218
- Disestablished: 1538

Site
- Location: Tandridge, Surrey, England
- Coordinates: 51.2541°N 0.02674°E

Tandridge Priory was a priory in Surrey, England.

== History ==
Tandridge Priory was originally a hospital founded in 1189–99 by Odo de Dammartin, and became an Augustinian priory in 1218.

It was a small foundation of probably no more than five canons, whose chief duty was to pray for the priory's benefactors. In the Valor Ecclesiasticus of 1535, the clear annual value of the priory was £81 7s. 4d. This was less than a fifth of the larger Sheen Priory in the north of the county. At that time, the priory held the rectory (church lands, tithes and donations) of Tandridge producing £13 6s. 8d, the rectory of Crowhurst £8 6s, and half the rectory of Godstone (alias Wolkensted) paying £3 11s. 8d. John Lyngfield, the last prior, obtained a pension of £14.

The priory was disbanded in 1538 as part of the Dissolution of the Monasteries, which did away with almost all such institutions.This enabled Henry VIII to expropriate their assets.

== Successor to main site ==
There is now a Grade II listed 17th-century country house on the far north of the site and a horse riding centre on the remainder, with the original priory and three fishponds in the grounds at the rear.
