= Guildford Black Friary =

Former Dominican friary in Surrey, England

Guildford Friary
- Interactive map of Guildford Friary

Monastery information
- Order: Dominican
- Established: c. 1275
- Disestablished: 1538

People
- Founder: Queen Eleanor of Provence

Site
- Location: Guildford, Surrey, England
- Coordinates: 51°14′11″N 0°34′34″W
- Visible remains: No
- Public access: Not applicable

Guildford Friary was a medieval monastic house in Guildford, Surrey, England. It was founded c. 1275 by Eleanor of Provence, wife of Henry III and occupied a site of around 10 acres (4.0 ha) on the east side of the River Wey. It was dissolved in 1537.

A private house was constructed on the site in 1630 and in 1794 it was bought by the War Office and used for barracks. In the mid-19th century the land was divided and sold for housebuilding. In 1858, the Chennel family set up a steam-powered flour mill on the site of the friary church and cloisters, which was subsequently purchased and converted to a brewery by Thomas Taunton in the 1870s. Brewing ceased in December 1968 and the site was sold to the developer, MEPC plc. The buildings were cleared and archaeological excavations took place in 1974 and 1978 in advance of the construction of The Friary shopping centre, which opened in November 1980.

== Description ==
Guildford Black Friary was built to the north of Guildford town centre on gravel and alluvial soils deposited by the River Wey. The 10-acre (4.0 ha) site sloped downwards from east to west and levelling in the 17th and 19th centuries buried the remains of the friary buildings to an average depth of around 1 m (3 ft 3 in).

Excavations in 1974 and 1978 showed that the friary was constructed around a central, square cloister, with the nave of the church forming the south range. The main entrance is thought to have been on the east side, from the route now known as Woodbridge Road. There are thought to have been two paths leading south from the nave, one most likely used by worshippers to access the nave from the town and the other for the friars to reach the graveyard. The kitchen formed the north range of the cloister and the chapter house was on the east side.

At the east end of the nave, and to the south of the chapter house, were the choir and chancel, which may have been the first parts of the friary to be built. A chantry chapel was added on the north side of the chancel in the 14th century and the east end of the church was extended at a later point. The suppression inventory mentions a steeple housing two bells "a grete and a small", although it is unclear where it stood. The west end of the nave was not revealed during the excavations.

The walls of the friary varied in their materials and their construction, indicating that there were several distinct phases of building. The majority were made of chalk blocks, held together with mortar and faced internally with plaster and externally with flint. The original choir and chancel were constructed entirely of flint and the chancel extension was built entirely of chalk blocks. The majority of the floors in the friary were tiled.

Bones from around 113 individuals were found during the excavations, although only 65 were still in their original graves. Around 41 of the individuals were in the cemetery area on the south side of the church and 40 were in the nave, with the rest elsewhere on the site. The bones of only ten are thought to be female, seven of whom were buried in the church. Around ten of the individuals are thought to have been under the age of 15 when they died and five were over the age of 55. Several skeletons had been buried together and these communal graves may have been for victims of the bubonic plague.

== History ==
A community of Dominicans was founded by Eleanor of Provence, wife of Henry III, around 1275. The exact date of the foundation of the Black Friary is unknown, but it could not have taken place before 1236, the year of Eleanor's marriage to Henry. There is no mention of the friars being among those who prayed for the soul of her grandson, Prince Henry, who died in 1274 and it is possible that Eleanor founded the friary in his memory. Historical documents note that Henry's heart was "lodged at the Guildford Priory" and Eleanor is acknowledged as the "first fundryse". The earliest surviving record of the community is from 1275, when Edward I granted an enlargement of the friary grounds.

The earliest known prior is recorded simply as "William" in 1332. In 1336, there were 20 friars. From 1373 onwards, a complete list of priors has survived. The work carried out the friars included the maintenance of the royal hunting park on the opposite side of the River Wey and, Henry VIII gave 40 cartloads of wood each year to the friary in exchange for two masses per week.

The friary was dissolved on 10 October 1538, by which time there were only seven friars. The dissolution inventory of 1538 notes that the friary buildings included a church with choir and nave, two bells, a vestry and two kitchens; there is no mention of sleeping quarters, guest rooms or a refectory. The 16th-century poet and antiquarian, John Leland, noted that there was a well-stocked library. Following the dissolution, the building was occasionally used as a royal residence until 1606, when it was demolished and the materials used for construction projects elsewhere in the area. Stone blocks may have been reused at Loseley Park and some of the stained glass in the chapel of Abbot's Hospital on Guildford High Street may have come from the friary.

In 1630, the site was granted in fee simple to the Earl of Annandale, who had been given £100 to spend on the building in 1609. The property passed through a series of private owners until 1794, when it was bought by the War Office. It was used as a barracks until the end of the Napoleonic Wars, before being demolished in 1818. The grounds are indicated on an 1841 map of Guildford as the "Barrack Field" and shortly afterwards the area was divided into plots and sold for housebuilding. In 1858, the Chennel family set up a steam-powered flour mill on the site of the friary church and cloisters, which was subsequently purchased and converted to a brewery by Thomas Taunton in the 1870s. In 1956, the brewery merged with the Meux Brewery of Nine Elms to form Friary Meux. The combined company was taken over by Allied Breweries in 1963. Brewing ceased in December 1968 and the site was sold to the developer, MEPC plc. The brewery was demolished in 1974 and, after archaeological investigations had been concluded, construction of The Friary shopping centre began in 1978. The Friary was opened by Princess Alexandra in November 1980. County Sound Radio began broadcasting from a studio on the roof of the centre in May 1983.

== Friary of Crutched Friars ==
During the 1974 and 1978 excavations, traces of an earlier building were found under the Dominican building. This building had pottery dating after 1250. It has been suggested that this was the House of the Friars de Ordine Martyrum at Guildford. Also referred to as the Fratres Ordinis S Morise de Ordine Cruciferorum, this was a small and short-lived order, who came to Britain in 1244. In 1260 they were given permission to inhabit a piece of land they had acquired at Guildford. The Friars de Ordine Martyrum was dissolved by the Council of Lyons in 1274, along with a number of the smaller orders including the Friars of the Sack and the Pied Friars. It is possible that Eleanor incorporated parts of this earlier community into her foundation.

There has also been the suggestion of a later House of Crutched Friars in Guildford associated with the Spital, or St Thomas' Hospital, that once stood in the angle between the Epsom and London roads in Guildford. However, the only authority for the existence of a house of crutched friars at Guildford is Speed's 1611 History of Great Britaine and no other writer mentions this group.

== Bibliography ==
- Chamberlin, E.R. (1982). Guildford (2nd ed.). Chichester: Phillimore. ISBN 978-0-85-033457-9.
- Field, Marion (2022). The story of Guildford (2nd ed.). Andover: Phillimore. ISBN 978-0-75-099899-4.
- Madden, Frederick (1836). Issues of the Exchequer in the Reign of James I.
- Rose, David; Parke, Bernard (2007). Guildford : Remember when?. Derby: Breedon Books. ISBN 978-1-85-983588-3.
- Rose, David (2001). Guildford : Our town. Derby: Breedon Books. ISBN 978-1-85-983262-2.
- Woods, Humphrey; Poulton, Robert (1984). "Excavations on the site of the Dominican Friary at Guildford". Surrey Archaeological Society Research Volumes. 9: 1–71. Archived from the original on 8 August 2022.
