= Margaret Harrison (violinist) =

British violinist (1899–1995)

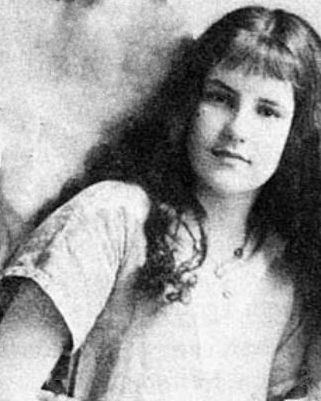
- Born: 1899; Chatham, England
- Died: 24 December 1995 (aged 95–96); Limpsfield, Surrey, England
- Occupation: Violinist
- Parent: Colonel John Harrison

Margaret Harrison (1899–1995) was an English violinist and the youngest of four sisters who were respected classical musicians in Great Britain during the early 20th century. Each had started out as child prodigies.

Her sisters, May (1890–1959), Beatrice (1892–1965), and Monica (1897–1983), became, respectively, a violinist, a cellist, and a mezzo-soprano. All four were reportedly also talented pianists. Her eldest sister, May Harrison, became known for her interpretations of the violin works of Bach, Brahms and Delius while her sister, Beatrice, was praised by King George V for her outdoor recordings at the Harrison's home at Foyle Riding in Oxted, Surrey of cello works mingled with nightingale songs.

According to Katrina Fountain who wrote a biographical sketch of the Harrison sisters:

However much we admire the soloists of today, things will never be the same as during the lifetime of the Harrison family. They dedicated their lives to the cause of music, paving the way for a generation of women musicians. They gained the respect of the leading composers and performers of their day and set a musical precedent in the history of English music.

== Formative years ==
Margaret Harrison was the youngest child of Colonel John Harrison, an amateur flautist who had been given command of The Royal Engineers Band at Chatham, England in 1892, and his wife Annie Harrison, who had studied singing at the Royal College of Music with Sir George Henschel and Gustave Garcia, but gave up hopes of a career after her marriage. Her eldest sisters had begun to display their talents as musical prodigies by the time of Margaret's birth at Chatham in 1899. (May Harrison, the oldest of the Harrison children, had begun violin studies in 1892 at the age of two.)

From 1901 to 1920, Margaret Harrison and her sisters were reared at Cornwall Gardens (with the exception of a brief interruption in 1908). In 1904, at the age of five, Margaret was accepted to study violin with Achille Rivarde and composition with Charles Villiers Stanford at London's Royal College of Music becoming, at that time, the youngest student ever accepted by that institution. Her sisters, May and Beatrice, had previously been admitted to the college, respectively, in 1901 and 1903. In 1908, the bulk of the Harrison family relocated to Berlin Germany, where Beatrice Harrison began studies at the Hochschule für Musik. After she was settled, May Harrison left Berlin that same year with sister, Margaret, and their mother. Arriving in Saint Petersburg, Russia, Margaret began her studies with Joanes Nalbandian while May studied with Leopold Auer before making her European debut in 1909.

Over the next decade, May and Beatrice Harrison increased their fame through performances of Brahms’ Double-Concerto for Violin and Cello. Following their initial performance of the piece under the baton of Alexander Glazunov in St. Petersburg, they then performed that work nearly 60 more times for European audiences, including a concert under the baton of Sir Thomas Beecham at Hallé on 3 December 1914. Inspired by their performance that night, Frederick Delius returned home to pen a Double Concerto, which he then dedicated to the Harrison sisters and which they, in turn, performed in 1920.

According to Margaret Harrison:

We were all very fond of Delius. We knew him from the early war years, and that was the real Delius. Our friendship really started when he wrote the Double Concerto, but May was playing Sonata No. 1 with Hamilton Harty [Aeolian Hall, London, 16 June 1915] even before we knew Delius well…. Both May and I love Sonata No. 1. I played it a lot. I played both the First and Second Sonatas to Delius who seemed to enjoy it. He always praised when one played, he was very good in that. May and Beatrice went to Grez [where Delius resided] before I did. When we went over we would always play to Delius…. May went to Grez a lot, especially later when they were doing the Third Sonata which Delius wrote for her.”

Margaret Harrison then made her own debut in 1918, performing Stanford's Irish Concertino for violin and cello with her sisters, May and Beatrice, at Wigmore Hall in December of that year. She then later toured with her sister, Beatrice, throughout Europe and Russia.

In 1922, Margaret Harrison relocated with her family to Foyle Riding near Oxted and Limpsfield, Surrey. According to Candlin, "Their garden was the scene of many social charity garden parties, and received visitors from all over the world to see ‘The Garden of the Nightingales'” (the location where Margaret's sister, Beatrice, made her famed recordings of cello music with nightingale accompaniments)".

According to Fountain, it was at this time and place that Margaret Harrison's love for animals truly came into being. In addition to 16 Aberdeen terriers, the grounds of the Harrison's estate were home to an Airedale, Irish Wolfhound, two baby alligators, and a number of birds, including budgerigars, canaries and parrots. Three years later, she performed at the Promenade Concerts in London.

1926 and 1927 also proved to be important years as Margaret Harrison and her sister, Beatrice, toured the United States and the Netherlands, performing the cello sonata of Delius. In a 1984 interview for The Delius Society, she recalled:

My limited piano-playing was enough to enable me to accompany in the Cello Sonata, so Beatrice and I played it everywhere. We played it at our sixpenny concerts to the miners. I also played it to Delius, just as I played the orchestral piano part of the Elgar Concerto with Beatrice, and once when I was playing Elgar called out, "Play it with more abandon!" and came and sat on the stool to play, throwing me on the floor. I’ve never forgotten landing on the floor: after that I played it with plenty of abandon!

During the mid-1930s, the Harrison sisters suffered multiple losses with the 1934 deaths of their mother and, in June of that same year, Delius. Their father, who had also been in declining health also then passed away a short time later.

Among the friends and colleagues made by the sisters in the musical community, in addition to Delius, Elgar and Glazunov, were: Eugen d'Albert, Sir Arnold Bax, Pablo Casals, John Ireland, Fritz Kreisler, Zoltán Kodály, Dame Nellie Melba, Ernest John Moeran, Oskar Nedbal, Arthur Nikisch, Roger Quilter, Sergei Rachmaninoff, and Felix Weingartner. Their circle of friends also included the politically well connected, including Eleanor Roosevelt and Princess Victoria, the daughter of King Edward VII and Queen Alexandra, as well as George Bernard Shaw and other artists and writers.

Prior to the outbreak of World War II, May Harrison's performances were frequently heard live in Promenade Concerts and via the BBC Radio. Three of the Harrison sisters – Margaret, Beatrice and May – performed in the Delius Memorial Concert at Wigmore Hall on 29 May 1946, which helped raise funds to ease the war-related suffering of European children.

== Animal rescue and breeding ==
Margaret Harrison continued to hone her knowledge of various animal species as she grew to womanhood. Ultimately, she became a breeder of Irish Wolfhounds and regular supplier of the dogs to English military units for use as regimental mascots. In addition, she was the founder of Sanctuary Kennels.

In her 2016 book, Carole Lashmar recalled her first meeting with Margaret Harrison:

… I do remember going with my mum and Aunt Dobbie to the Sanctuary Kennels in Outwood…. Will always remember driving up the drive with hedges either side, or when we got to the top a circular drive with a water fountain in the middle. Two ladies greeted us Margaret Harrison who was a very big name in Irish Wolfhounds and Margaret Atfield. The Sanctuary Kennels was set up in the early 1940s by Margaret Harrison and May Atfield. The name 'Sanctuary' was based on the work they did from the start of the 2nd World War taking care of dogs belonging to airmen whilst they were flying or if they had been killed or imprisoned.

Lashmar explained in her book that Margaret Harrington had met May Atfield sometime in the 1930s through their shared interest of Irish Wolfhounds; Atfield then moved into the Harrison household during the latter part of that decade. “The first Irish Wolfhound registered to Margaret and May under the Sanctuary prefix was listed in November 1943".

== Death and interment ==
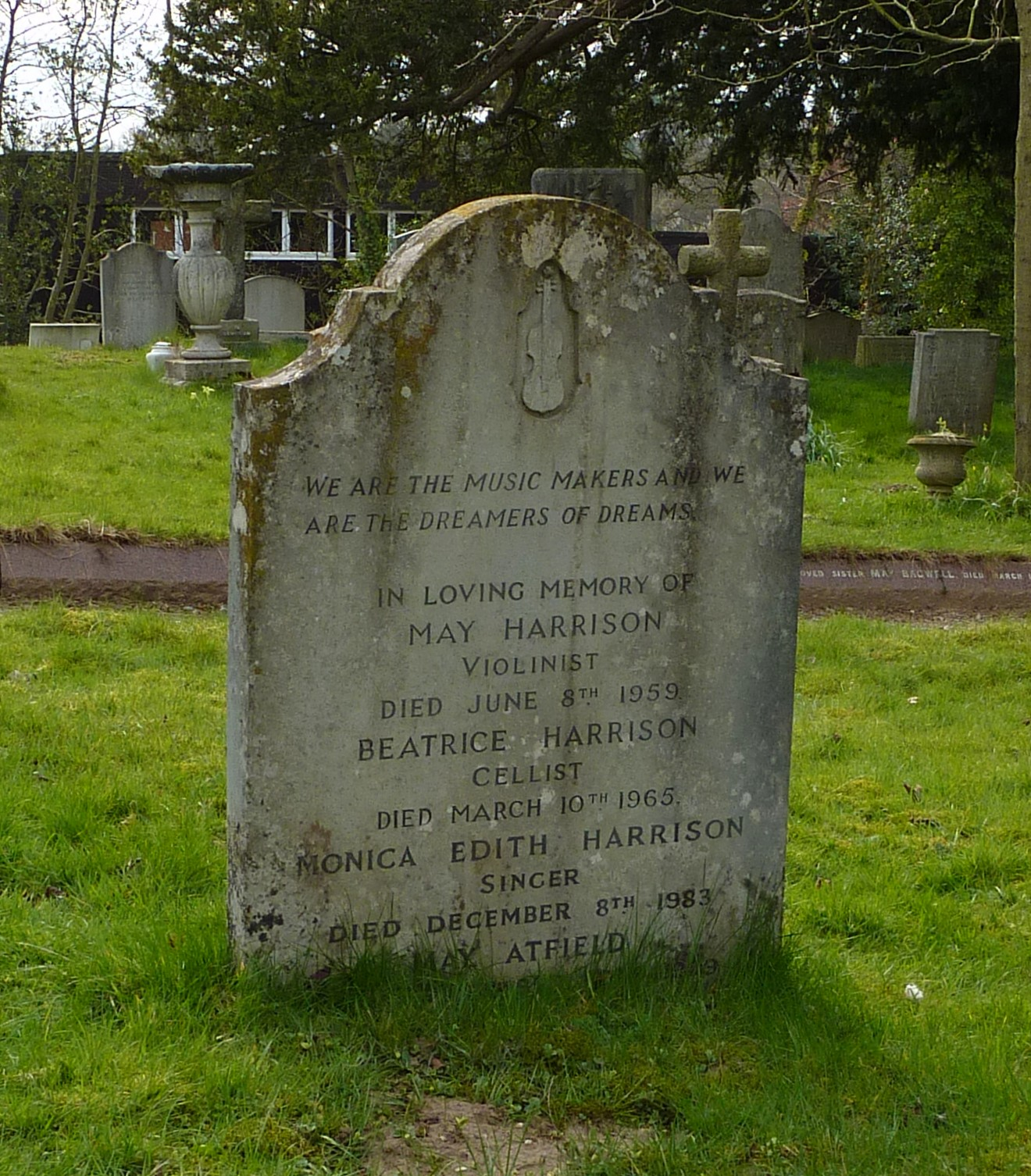
Harrison sisters' grave at St Peter's Church in Limpsfield, Surrey, photographed in 2013

Preceded in death by her sister, May, in England on 8 June 1959, Margaret Harrison continued to reside with her sisters, Beatrice and Monica, in Limpsfield, Surrey. Beatrice and Monica Harrison then also died on 10 March 1960 and 8 December 1983 respectively. Towards the end of her life Margaret Harrison was cared for at the manse in Gourock, Renfrewshire, where she died on Christmas Eve, 1995.

All four of the Harrison sisters, who had never married, were buried at the St. Peter Churchyard cemetery in Limpsfield.

According to Fountain, their mother had also been buried at the same cemetery in 1934. Delius is also buried nearby. “On his death in June 1934 Delius was buried at Grez-sur-Loing, but he had once told Mrs. Harrison that he would like to be buried in an English churchyard. Mrs. Harrison herself died earlier that same year (and their father, already ill, died soon after), but the sisters, after consulting Jelka Delius, saw that this wish was carried out, and in May 1935 his [Delius'] body was exhumed and brought over to England to be laid to rest in Limpsfield churchyard, near to the Harrisons' own mother's grave.”
