= Monica Harrison =

English mezzo-soprano

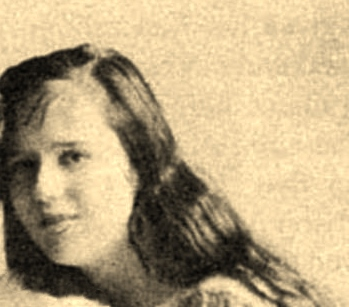
- Born: 1897; Redcliffe Square, London, England
- Died: 8 December 1983 (aged 85–86); Limpsfield, Surrey, England
- Occupation: Mezzo-soprano
- Parent: Colonel John Harrison

Monica Harrison (1897–1983) was an English mezzo-soprano and the third-born of four sisters who were respected classical musicians in Great Britain during the early 20th century. Each had started out as child prodigies.

Her sisters, May (1890–1959) and Margaret (1899-1995), became violinists while second-eldest sister Beatrice (1892–1965) became a cellist. All four were reportedly also talented pianists. Musically, May became known for her interpretations of the violin works of Bach, Brahms and Delius while Beatrice was praised by King George V for her outdoor recordings at the Harrison's home at Foyle Riding in Oxted, Surrey of cello works mingled with nightingale songs.

According to Katrina Fountain who wrote a biographical sketch of the Harrison sisters:

However much we admire the soloists of today, things will never be the same as during the lifetime of the Harrison family. They dedicated their lives to the cause of music, paving the way for a generation of women musicians. They gained the respect of the leading composers and performers of their day and set a musical precedent in the history of English music.

== Formative years ==
Born at Redcliffe Square, London in 1897, Monica Harrison was the third child of Colonel John Harrison, an amateur flautist who had been given command of The Royal Engineers Band at Chatham, England in 1892. Her mother Anne had studied singing with Sir George Henschel and Gustave Garcia at the Royal College of Music, but gave up hopes of a career after her marriage. Her eldest sisters had begun to display their talents as musical prodigies by the time of the 1899 Chatham birth of the youngest Harrison sister, Margaret.

May Harrison, the oldest of the Harrison children, had begun violin studies in 1892 at the age of two, and was admitted to the Royal College of Music in 1901; sister Beatrice followed her into the RCM two years later. In 1904, the “baby” of the quartet, Margaret, then became the youngest student ever accepted to the RCM when she was five. Monica, however, chose to use her voice as the vehicle for her musicality, a decision based on the difficult circumstances of her birth, according to Fountain:

Monica … the least known of the family, was also talented musically but she did not have her sisters’ physical strength. Her premature birth had resulted in defective tendons in the arms and legs, and she also suffered from poor health much of her life.

A childhood accident also reportedly limited her educational and performing opportunities. As a result, when her parents determined that she was ready to pursue more advanced vocal training, Monica Harrison entered into studies with Victor Beigel.

From 1901 to 1920, Monica Harrison and her sisters were reared at Cornwall Gardens (with the exception of a brief interruption in 1908). Her sisters, May and Beatrice, had previously been admitted to the college, respectively, in 1901 and 1903.

In 1908, the bulk of the Harrison family relocated to Berlin, Germany, where Beatrice Harrison began studies at the Hochschule für Musik. After she was settled, Margaret and May Harrison left Berlin that same year with their mother for St. Petersburg, Russia, where Margaret pursued studies with Joanes Nalbandian and May studied with Leopold Auer before making her European debut in 1909.

Over the next decade, May and Beatrice Harrison increased their fame through nearly 60 performances of Brahms’ Double-Concerto for Violin and Cello under the baton of Alexander Glazunov, Sir Thomas Beecham, et al. Inspired by one of their 1914 performances, Frederick Delius returned home to pen his own Double Concerto, which he then dedicated to the Harrison sisters and which they, in turn, performed in 1920.

According to Margaret Harrison:

We were all very fond of Delius. We knew him from the early war years, and that was the real Delius. Our friendship really started when he wrote the Double Concerto, but May was playing Sonata No. 1 with Hamilton Harty [Aeolian Hall, London, June 16, 1915] even before we knew Delius well…. Both May and I love Sonata No. 1. I played it a lot. I played both the First and Second Sonatas to Delius who seemed to enjoy it. He always praised when one played, he was very good in that. May and Beatrice went to Grez [where Delius resided] before I did. When we went over we would always play to Delius…. May went to Grez a lot, especially later when they were doing the Third Sonata which Delius wrote for her.”

In 1922, Monica Harrison relocated with her family to Foyle Riding near Oxted and Limpsfield, Surrey. According to Candlin, “Their garden was the scene of many social charity garden parties, and received visitors from all over the world to see ‘The Garden of the Nightingales'” (the location where Margaret's sister, Beatrice, made her famed recordings of cello music with nightingale accompaniments).” Two years later, Monica Harrison finally made her own musical debut.

During the mid-1930s, the Harrison sisters suffered multiple losses with the 1934 deaths of their mother and, in June of that same year, Delius. Their father, who had also been in declining health also then died a short time later.

In March 1937, the Sevenoaks Chronicle and Kentish Advertiser reported that “Miss Monica Harrison sang two delightful groups of songs” in a concert in which her sisters, Beatrice and Margaret, also performed.

Among the friends and colleagues made by the sisters in the musical community were: Eugen d’Albert, Sir Arnold Bax, Pablo Casals, Sir Edward Elgar, John Ireland, Fritz Kreisler, Zoltán Kodály, Dame Nellie Melba, Ernest John Moeran, Oskar Nedbal, Arthur Nikisch, Roger Quilter, Sergei Rachmaninoff, and Felix Weingartner. Their circle also included the politically well connected, including Eleanor Roosevelt and Princess Victoria, the daughter of King Edward VII and Queen Alexandra, as well as George Bernard Shaw and other artists and writers.

== Death and interment ==
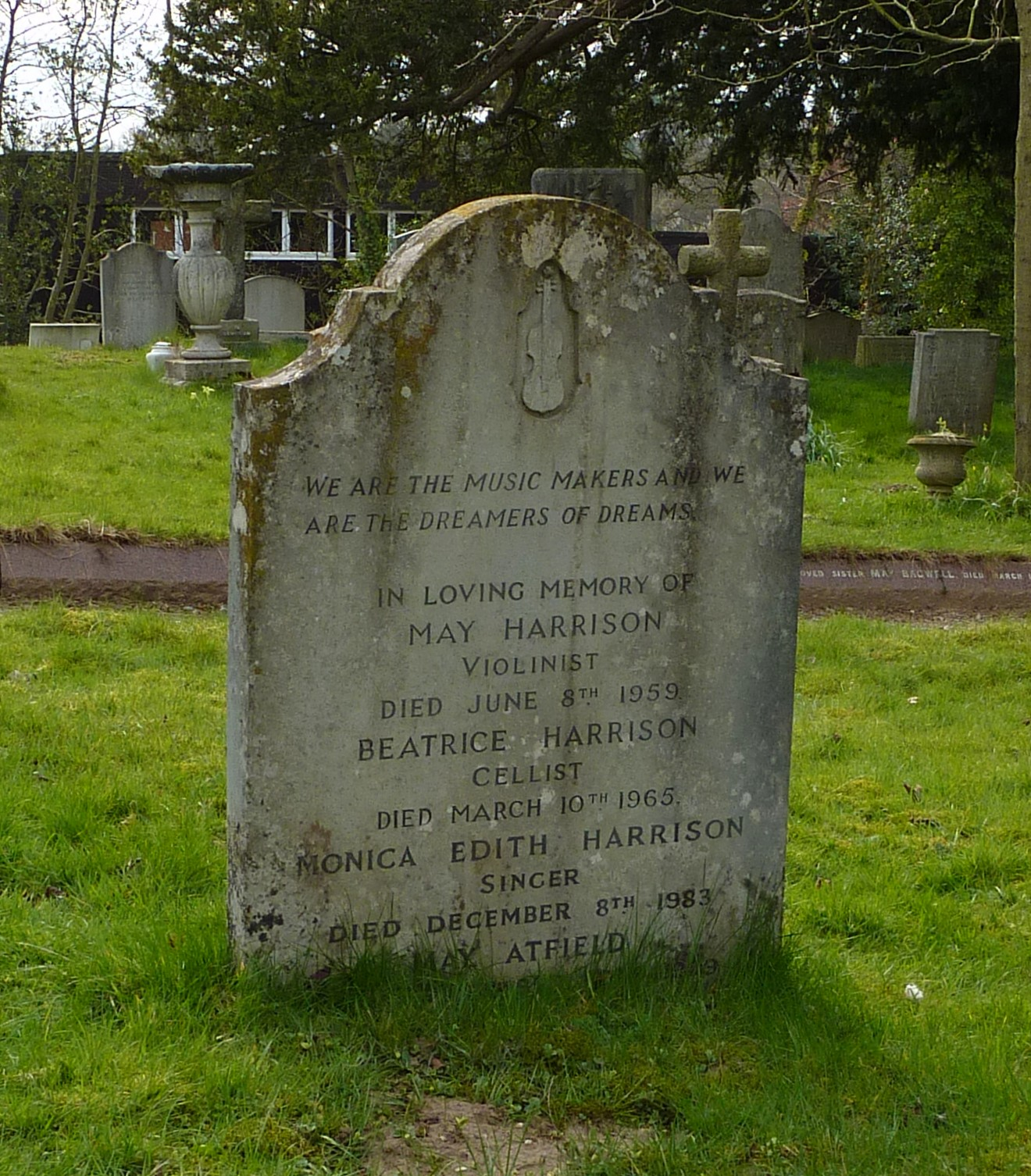
Harrison sisters' grave at St Peter's Church in Limpsfield, Surrey, photographed in 2013

Preceded in death by her sister, May, in England on 8 June 1959, Monica Harrison continued to reside with her sisters, Beatrice and Margaret, in Limpsfield, Surrey. Beatrice Harrison then also died on 10 March 1965. Monica and Margaret continued to live together for more than two decades – until Monica's passing on 8 December 1983. Margaret then also died – on Christmas Eve, 1995.

All four of the Harrison sisters, who had never married, were buried at the St. Peter Churchyard cemetery in Limpsfield.

According to Fountain, their mother had also been laid to rest at the same cemetery in 1934. Delius also rests nearby. “On his death in June 1934 Delius was buried at Grez-sur-Loing, but he had once told Mrs. Harrison that he would like to be buried in and English churchyard. Mrs. Harrison herself died earlier that same year (and their father, already ill, died soon after), but the sisters, after consulting Jelka Delius, saw that this wish was carried out, and in May 1935 his [Delius'] body was exhumed and brought over to England to be laid to rest in Limpsfield churchyard, near to the Harrisons' own mother's grave.”
