= May Harrison =

English violinist (1890–1959)

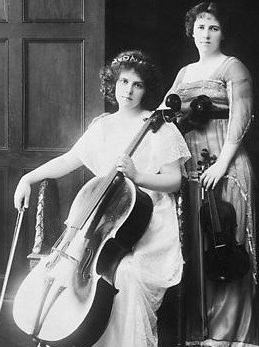
- May Harrison, violinist (standing), and her sister, Beatrice Harrison, cellist, c. 1920s
- Born: 23 August 1890; India
- Died: 8 June 1959 (aged 58); England
- Occupation: Violinist
- Parent: Colonel John Harrison

May Harrison (23 August 1890 – 8 June 1959) was an English violinist and the oldest of four sisters who were classical musicians in Great Britain during the early 20th century. Each had started out as a child prodigy.

== Information ==
May Harrison's sisters, Beatrice (1892–1965), Monica (1897–1983) and Margaret (1899–1995) became, respectively, a cellist, mezzo-soprano, and violinist. All four were reportedly also talented pianists. May Harrison became known for her interpretations of the violin works of Bach, Brahms, Elgar, Glazunov, Grieg, Handel, and Mendelssohn while her sister, Beatrice, was praised by King George V for her outdoor recordings at the Harrisons' home at Foyle Riding in Oxted, Surrey, of cello works mingled with nightingale songs. The monarch reportedly thanked her for bringing "the Empire closer together through the song of the nightingale and your cello".

According to Katherine Fountain, who wrote a biographical sketch of the Harrison sisters:

However much we admire the soloists of today, things will never be the same as during the lifetime of the Harrison family. They dedicated their lives to the cause of music, paving the way for a generation of women musicians. They gained the respect of the leading composers and performers of their day and set a musical precedent in the history of English music.

== Formative years ==
Born in India in 1890, May Harrison was a daughter of Colonel John Harrison, an amateur flautist who was the principal at St. Thomas College of Sappers and Miners. Her mother Annie Harrison had studied singing at the Royal College of Music with Sir George Henschel and Gustave Garcia, but gave up hopes of a career after her marriage.. Her sister, Beatrice, was born in 1892 in Roorkee, Uttarakhand, "in a picturesque valley of the Himalayas", where her father worked, according to David Candlin.

That same year, the family returned to England, where May Harrison's father was given command of The Royal Engineers Band at Chatham. May Harrison began her violin studies in 1892 when she was just two years old. Sisters Monica and Margaret were born, respectively, at Redcliffe Square, London in 1897 and Chatham in 1899. From 1901 to 1920, May Harrison and her sisters grew up at Cornwall Gardens (with the exception of a brief interruption in 1908).

== Musical training and career ==
In 1900, May Harrison vied against 3,000 male and female musicians of all ages in the Associated Board's Senior Department, taking home the Gold Medal when she was just ten years old. The next year, she was awarded a scholarship to The Royal College of Music. Her sisters, Beatrice and Margaret, were also accepted to the college, respectively in 1903 and 1904. (At the time of her enrolment, Margaret Harrison was reportedly the youngest student the college had ever accepted.)

From 1902 to 1907, May Harrison trained under Madrid Symphony conductor Fernandez Arbos. In 1903, she made her formal debut at St. James Hall. The program, conducted by Henry Wood, included: Bach's Chaconne and E Major Concerto, Mendelssohn's Violin Concerto, and Saint-Saëns' Introduction and Rondo Cappriccioso. In the audience was violinist Fritz Kreisler.

According to Katrina Fountain, "May's genius, even at the age of fifteen, became apparent to Arbos who invited her in 1906 to make her European debut with the Madrid Symphony Orchestra. This was a great success and, with her mother as chaperone, she went to meet the Spanish Royal family and was presented with a gift of jewels".

In 1908, the bulk of the Harrison family relocated to Berlin, Germany for two years, where Beatrice Harrison began studies at the Hochschule für Musik. Meanwhile, May Harrison left England in 1908 to pursue her own studies in Saint Petersburg, Russia with Leopold Auer. She then made her European debut in 1909 in Berlin, Germany. That same year, she replaced Fritz Kreisler at the Mendelssohn Festival in Helsingfors, Finland".

Over the next decade, May and Beatrice Harrison increased their fame through performances of Johannes Brahms' Double-Concerto for Violin and Cello. Following their initial performance of the piece under the baton of Alexander Glazunov in St. Petersburg, they then performed it nearly 60 more times for European audiences, including a concert under the baton of Sir Thomas Beecham at Hallé (Manchester) on 3 December 1914. Inspired by their performance that night, Frederick Delius returned home to pen a Double Concerto, which he then dedicated to the Harrison sisters and which they, in turn, performed in 1920.

According to May Harrison's sister, Beatrice:

It was a great thrill the first time I met Delius. My sister May (who is a very fine violinist) and I were playing the Double Brahms Concerto with Sir Thomas Beecham at Manchester, and after the performance a very charming looking man came forward, and when Sir Thomas introduced him we were enchanted to hear that it was Delius in the flesh. I wish I could describe our delight when he said that he thought our performance was superb, so much so that he himself was inspired to write a double concerto and dedicate it to my sister and me. And he did it! Of course we had that marvellous conductor and a splendid orchestra that evening, and we feel we can never thank them enough for helping us to inspire Delius to write his glorious Double. Many critics consider it one of the finest orchestral works.

According to May Harrison's sister, Margaret:

We were all very fond of Delius. We knew him from the early war years, and that was the real Delius. Our friendship really started when he wrote the Double Concerto, but May was playing Sonata No. 1 with Hamilton Harty [Aeolian Hall, London, 16 June 1915] even before we knew Delius well.... Both May and I love Sonata No. 1. I played it a lot. I played both the First and Second Sonatas to Delius who seemed to enjoy it. He always praised when one played, he was very good in that. May and Beatrice went to Grez [where Delius resided] before I did. When we went over we would always play to Delius.... May went to Grez a lot, especially later when they were doing the Third Sonata which Delius wrote for her.

May Harrison also later described Delius (an a 1945 lecture for the Royal Music Association):

To those who love Delius's music it holds a magic so irresistible and a beauty so individual that the sound at times can bring actual pain. The playing of Delius's music, I consider, an instinct, an improvisation on the spur of the moment, and because of this elusive quality, this intangible something, I maintain that it is practically impossible to teach that music. No composer, I think, relied to such an extent on his interpreters, who can make or mar to such a degree as to change the whole colour and meaning of his work; and no composer suffered more from indifferent playing than he did. Exact intonation is one of the greatest difficulties. I have seen him shudder with agony at bad intonation or insensitive phrasing; and now when I see his works so often set for examinations I feel I must offer up a prayer that Delius may be comforted for the performances that are bound to come forth!

In 1922, May Harrison moved with her family to Foyle Riding in Oxted and Limpsfield, Surrey. According to Candlin, "Their garden was the scene of many social charity garden parties, and received visitors from all over the world to see 'The Garden of the Nightingales'" (the location where May's sister, Beatrice, made her famed recordings of cello music with nightingale accompaniments).

In 1930, Delius dedicated his Violin Sonata, No. 3 to May Harrison. Four years later, the Harrison sisters suffered multiple losses with the 1934 deaths of their mother and, in June, Delius. Their father, who had also been in declining health, also died a short time later.

Among the friends and colleagues the sisters made in the musical community, in addition to Beecham, Delius, Elgar, Kreisler, and Glazunov were: Eugen d'Albert, Sir Arnold Bax, Pablo Casals, John Ireland, Zoltán Kodály, Dame Nellie Melba, Ernest John Moeran, Oskar Nedbal, Arthur Nikisch, Roger Quilter, Sergei Rachmaninoff, Freda Swain and Felix Weingartner. Delius and others dedicated several of their compositions to various Harrison sisters. Their circle of friends also included the politically well connected, including Eleanor Roosevelt and Princess Victoria, the daughter of King Edward VII and Queen Alexandra, as well as George Bernard Shaw and other artists and writers.

Prior to the outbreak of World War II, May Harrison's performances were frequently heard live in Promenade Concerts and via the BBC Radio. From 1935 to 1947, she was also a member of the faculty at The Royal College of Music. Three of the sisters – May, Beatrice and Margaret – performed in the Delius Memorial Concert at Wigmore Hall on 29 May 1946, which helped raise funds to ease the war-related suffering of European children.

== Death and interment ==
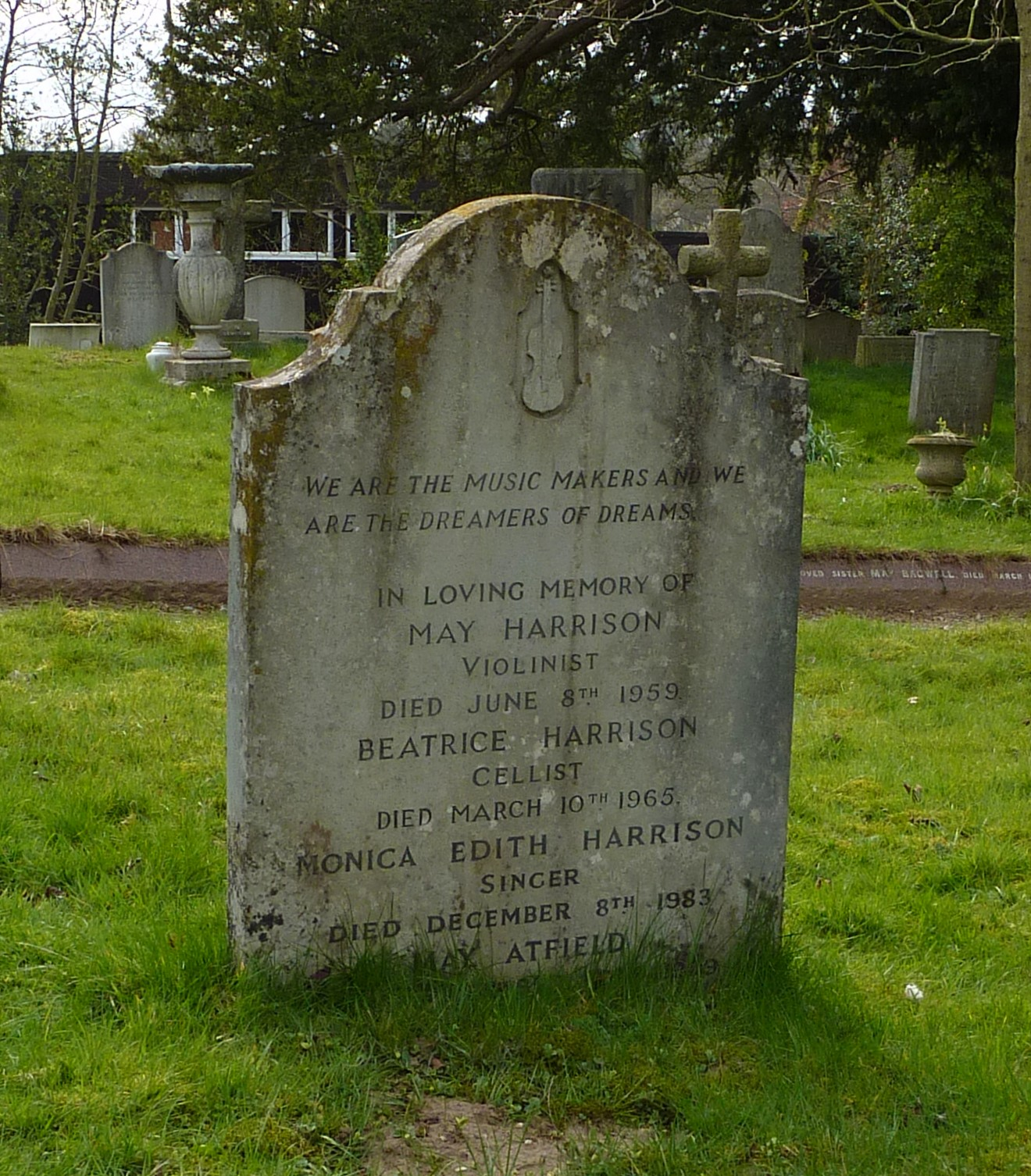
Harrison sisters' grave at St Peter's Church in Limpsfield, Surrey, photographed in 2013

May Harrison and her sisters remained single until their deaths. Following May Harrison's death in England on 8 June 1959, and her subsequent burial at St. Peter Churchyard cemetery in Limpsfield, Surrey, the three surviving sisters – Beatrice, Margaret and Monica – lived together in Limpsfield. Beatrice was the next to die, in Limpsfield on 10 March 1965, followed by Monica, died there on 8 December 1983 and Margaret, who died there on Christmas Eve in 1995. All three sisters were laid to rest at the same cemetery where their elder sister, May, had been interred.

According to Fountain, their mother had also been laid to rest at the same cemetery in 1934. Delius also rests nearby. "On his death in June 1934 Delius was buried at Grez-sur-Loing, but he had once told Mrs. Harrison that he would like to be buried in an English churchyard. Mrs. Harrison herself died earlier that same year (and their father, already ill, died soon after), but the sisters, after consulting Jelka Delius, saw that this wish was carried out, and in May 1935 his [Delius'] body was exhumed and brought over to England to be laid to rest in Limpsfield churchyard, near to the Harrisons' own mother's grave".
