= Thomas Cundy III =

Thomas Cundy III ( Thomas de Candie, 17 October 1821 – 4 November 1895) was a British architect. Grandson of Thomas Cundy Snr, he joined his father's practice in the 1840s and was also surveyor of the Grosvenor Estate, London. He retired from that post in 1890, and was succeeded by Eustace Balfour.

He and his father were jointly responsible for a number of Gothic churches, including St Barnabas, Pimlico. On his own account he designed London terraces outside of the Grosvenor estate in an Italianate style, including Cornwall Gardens and parts of Queen's Gate, both in Kensington. He designed 6-16 Grosvenor Place,(41 Chapel Street) in the French renaissance style, for Grosvenor in 1868. Cundy also designed the three arched entrances of Kynance Mews.

He is buried in Brompton Cemetery, London.

== Sources ==
- H.M. Colvin, A Biographical Dictionary of British Architects, 1600–1840 (1997) ISBN 0-300-07207-4
