= Who Dares Wins (film) =

1982 British film by Ian Sharp

- Poster for the film's UK cinema release
- Directed by: Ian Sharp
- Written by: Reginald Rose
- Produced by: Chris Chrisafis; Euan Lloyd; Raymond Menmuir
- Starring: Lewis Collins; Judy Davis; Richard Widmark; Tony Doyle; John Duttine; Kenneth Griffith; Rosalind Lloyd; Ingrid Pitt; Norman Rodway; Edward Woodward; Robert Webber
- Cinematography: Phil Méheux
- Edited by: John Grover
- Music by: Roy Budd
- Production company: Richmond Light Horse Productions / Varius
- Distributed by: Rank Film Distributors (UK); MGM/UA Entertainment Co. (US)
- Release date: 26 August 1982 (UK)
- Running time: 125 minutes
- Country: United Kingdom
- Language: English
- Budget: £5 million
- Box office: £544,051 (UK) $2,666,973 (US)

Who Dares Wins (released as The Final Option in the US) is a 1982 British action film directed by Ian Sharp and starring Lewis Collins, Judy Davis, Richard Widmark, Tony Doyle and Edward Woodward. The film is loosely based on the actions of the British Army's Special Air Service (SAS) in the 1980 Iranian Embassy siege; however, the plot makes considerable fictionalised departures from the actual siege and its background, and instead follows SAS Captain Peter Skellen as he infiltrates a terrorist group planning an attack on American diplomats. The film's title references the motto of the SAS.

Euan Lloyd, the film's producer, witnessed the Iranian embassy siege first-hand and was inspired to make a film based on it, moving quickly to prevent someone else from developing the same idea. An initial synopsis, created by George Markstein, was then turned into a novel, The Tiptoe Boys, by James Follett in 30 days. Meanwhile, chapter-by-chapter as the novel was completed, it was posted to Reginald Rose in Los Angeles, who wrote the final screenplay.

Who Dares Wins was released in the United Kingdom on 26 August 1982 and, after U.S. President Ronald Reagan reportedly enjoyed the film, in the United States on 16 September 1983 as The Final Option. Though it was one of the highest-grossing films released in Britain in 1982, the film was a box-office bomb and was released to negative reviews, as well as criticism for its portrayal of the nuclear disarmament movement, though the action sequences received some praise.

== Plot ==
In London, a Campaign for Nuclear Disarmament (CND) demonstration is interrupted when a protester is killed. British security forces learn that a terrorist group has associated itself with the CND to further its own goals, and has been planning some sort of attack; the murdered protester was an undercover intelligence officer who had infiltrated the terrorist group. The commanding officer of the Special Air Service, Colonel J. Hadley, suggests a new line of inquiry for the investigation.

Meanwhile, two foreign officers—Captain Hagen of the United States Army Rangers and Captain Freund of GSG 9—arrive at SAS headquarters to take part in a training exercise. After overseeing an SAS close-quarters combat drill, Hadley introduces the officers to SAS Captain Peter Skellen and his troop consisting of Baker, Dennis, and Williamson. During an exercise in the Brecon Beacons, Hadley and Major Steele discover Skellen torturing Hagen and Freund, and dismiss him from the SAS. However, unbeknownst to the officers, the torture case is secretly a ruse to give Skellen a cover as a disgraced special forces soldier so he can infiltrate the terrorists.

Skellen's intelligence contact, Ryan, advises him to meet Frankie Leith and Rod Walker, the leaders of the People's Lobby (PL), believed to be the terrorist group planning the attack. A foreign man, Andrey Malek, arranges with a city banker for the distribution of large sums of money to organisations including the PL. Skellen arranges to meet Leith at a bar frequented by PL members, and initiates a sexual relationship with her, to the annoyance of Walker and his underlings, Helga and Mac. Leith brings Skellen to the organisation's headquarters, offers him a job as a security consultant to the PL, and allows him to move in with her.

To strengthen Skellen's cover story, Hadley provides Skellen's location to Hagen and Freund, and they viciously beat Skellen at Leith's house. The beating dissipates Leith's doubts about Skellen, but Walker and the other PL members remain suspicious. Helga and Walker observe Skellen meeting with Ryan, his wife Jenny, and their infant daughter, and use photographs from their surveillance to convince Leith that Skellen is not who he seems. Walker orders Helga to kill Ryan, cutting Skellen's link to Hadley, while Leith and Walker withhold information on the upcoming attack from Skellen. With direct contact between them lost, Hadley places his trust in Skellen to complete his mission, and orders police protection for Skellen's family.

On the day of the attack, Helga and Mac raid Skellen's house, taking his family and their police guard hostage; Leith uses this to blackmail Skellen into unconditional cooperation. The rest of the PL, including Leith, Walker, and Skellen, kidnap several United States Air Force airmen and use their uniforms to infiltrate the official residence of the United States ambassador to the United Kingdom. After gaining access, they attack and seize control of the residence, taking the U.S. Ambassador, Secretary of State Arthur Currie, Strategic Air Command Commander-in-Chief General Ira Potter, the British Foreign Secretary, their wives, and the staff hostage. Security forces, including Hadley and Metropolitan Police Commander Powell, respond to the attack and learn the PL's demands: unless an American nuclear missile is launched at the Holy Loch naval base, all of the hostages will be killed. Currie questions Leith's motivations, and Leith responds that her ultimate goal is the total disarmament of the entire world, sparking a debate about methods and political philosophy that only antagonises the terrorists. Meanwhile, Dennis and his SAS troop arrive at Skellen's house, where they use hidden cameras and microphones to surveil Helga, Mac, and their hostages.

Skellen separates himself from the group by going to the toilet, where he uses a mirror as a heliograph to reach Hadley through Morse code, advising an SAS assault at 10 a.m. while he creates a diversion. However, the British Home Secretary insists Powell resolve the situation through negotiation. As tensions mount inside the ambassador's residence, Potter attempts to steal a terrorist's MAC-11 but is shot by another terrorist, much to Leith's chagrin; the death of a hostage leads to the assault being greenlit. Meanwhile at Skellen's house, Helga and Jenny fight after the Skellens' baby begins to cry. Dennis's troop cuts the power and breaches through an adjoining wall using an explosive charge, then shoots Helga and Mac dead.

The SAS deploys to the roof of the ambassador's residence via Westland Scout helicopters, sparking panic among the unprepared terrorists. As the SAS makes entry, Skellen turns on the PL and kills several terrorists, including Walker, while the SAS methodically clears the residence, killing most of the remaining terrorists and rescuing all of the hostages. With the hostages safe, Skellen links up with Baker and his troop to search for Leith, the last surviving PL member. As he goes ahead of Baker's troop, Skellen is ambushed and held at gunpoint by Leith, but Steele arrives and shoots her before she can open fire; though disheartened by her death, Skellen presses on, and the residence is secured. As they leave, Skellen reconciles with Hagen and Freund before the SAS boards their helicopters and returns to base.

Later, in a government building, politician Sir Richard complains to a colleague about the violent end to the siege. He then meets with Malek, and they discuss future similar actions. Over the credits, a list of terrorist incidents is displayed, accompanied by a rendition of The Red Flag.

== Cast ==
- Lewis Collins as Captain Peter Skellen, SAS
- Judy Davis as Frankie Leith
- Richard Widmark as Secretary of State Arthur Currie
- Edward Woodward as Commander Powell, Metropolitan Police
- Robert Webber as USAF General Ira Potter
- Tony Doyle as Colonel J. Hadley, SAS commander
- John Duttine as Rod Walker
- Kenneth Griffith as the Right Reverend Horace W. Crick, the Bishop of Camden
- Rosalind Lloyd as Jenny Skellen
- Ingrid Pitt as Helga
- Norman Rodway as Ryan
- Don Fellows as the U.S. Ambassador
- Maurice Roëves as Major Steele
- Bob Sherman as Captain Hagen, U.S. Army Rangers
- Albert Fortell as Captain Freund, GSG 9
- Jon Morrison as Dennis
- Mark Ryan as Mac
- Lynne Miller as Melissa
- Ewan Stewart as Kevin
- Tony Osoba as Terrorist
- Ralph Arliss as Terrorist
- Peter Turner as Terrorist
- Patrick Allen as Police Commissioner
- Trevor Byfield as SAS trooper Steve Baker
- Nick Brimble as SAS trooper Williamson
- Anna Ford as Newsreader
- Aharon Ipalé as Andrey Malek
- Paul Freeman as Sir Richard
- Oz Clarke as Special Branch Man

== Production ==
=== Development ===
Euan Lloyd gained the idea for the film from events surrounding the Iranian Embassy siege in London, most notably the storming of the building on 5 May 1980 by the SAS. Living just half a mile from the embassy, he visited it on multiple occasions during the four days it was occupied by terrorists, witnessing the dramatic ending to the siege in person. That same evening he called his lawyer in New York and asked him to register five titles with the Motion Picture Association of America, one of which was SAS: Who Dares Wins. In a slightly abbreviated form, this became the name of the film based on the incident which he then set out to make.

Lloyd intended for Who Dares Wins to "counterbalance" the anti-authority messages of contemporary films like The China Syndrome, Missing, and Gandhi. Discussing his stance, Lloyd opined that "[s]ince John Wayne and Jack Warner have left the scene its become unfashionable to wave the flag." He also stated that the film was a reflection of his anti-terrorist beliefs and "an opportunity for me to say what I've felt for a long time."

Lloyd contacted friend, writer, and former intelligence officer George Markstein and commissioned a treatment. They decided to end the film with an embassy siege, but to make the film more relevant to American audiences they changed its nationality from Iranian to American. Similarly, they also exchanged the Iranian separatists of the real siege for anti-nuclear extremists. Markstein wrote a treatment in a week, then Lloyd gave the job of writing a script to Reginald Rose. According to director Ian Sharp he was "handed a script that needed a lot work". Sharp flew to the United States to work on the script with Rose, but they "never got to a really strong plot." The action scenes were rewritten by Sharp. The budget was raised by pre-selling the film to multiple territories.

Lloyd's investors were willing to go with a lesser name actor as star. The producer considered a number of options before going with Lewis Collins, then best known for The Professionals. Collins trained intensively for the part.

Judy Davis was cast on the strength of her performance in My Brilliant Career. She said she did not base her character on Patty Hearst as she felt Hearst was ultimately not serious about politics; she was inspired by Bommi Baumann and his book Terror or love?

It was Ingrid Pitt's first appearance in a feature film for almost a decade.

=== Filming ===
The production began in September 1981. The film had advisers who had worked in the SAS which led to some concerns from the Ministry of Defence that the film could breach the Official Secrets Act. However, Lloyd said the ministry eventually gave its "tacit approval" to the film after two small changes to the story were made, providing much wider access to defence equipment and personnel, including three military helicopters.

According to the DVD commentary, the film was made with the help of the 22 SAS Regiment at Hereford, although their commanding officer, Peter de la Billière, had initially refused to help in a pre-production meeting with Euan Lloyd. Director Ian Sharp, who was hired due to Lloyd's liking of his direction in The Professionals, was invited to SAS headquarters at Stirling Lines where he met some of the troops who assaulted the Iranian embassy. With the cooperation of the SAS achieved, production moved ahead swiftly.

During one of his visits to Stirling Lines, Sharp had met a Fijian trooper who had a mishap during the Iranian embassy assault. The trooper told how he got caught up in his descent and his uniform caught fire due to the explosives used for their forced entry. Inspired by this, Sharp had a similar scene inserted.

The first scenes were shot in Portobello Road market in January 1982. The concert, speech and subsequent fight were staged at the Union Chapel in Islington, London. Skellen's house and the hostage taking was shot in Kynance Mews in South Kensington.

When it came time to shoot the SAS assault on the U.S. Ambassador's residence, the crew had prepared the helicopters and stuntmen but the SAS offered to do the scene instead. Sharp accepted as he thought the look they gave could not be replicated by the crew.

The action sequences were arranged by veteran James Bond stuntman Bob Simmons.

"The film isn't a serious psychological study of a terrorist's mind, but it has been a good meaty part", said Judy Davis. According to an interview with director Ian Sharp, Judy Davis wanted the dialogue scene between her terrorist character and Richard Widmark's Secretary of State rewritten."She wanted her character to counter some of the things Widmark says to her. I wasn’t about to rewrite a scene of that magnitude that was already that well-written. I didn’t think her suggestions made any sense anyhow. Behind her objections lurked an actor’s ego."

Filming wrapped after seven weeks. Lloyd started to organise the publicity campaign, but like his previous film The Wild Geese, rumour had started to spread that the film was a right-wing propaganda film attacking the Campaign for Nuclear Disarmament.

== Soundtrack ==
The score was composed by Roy Budd, while the song "Right on Time", heard during the church scene, was written by Jerry and Marc Donahue.

== Reception ==
=== Box-office ===
The film was the sixth-highest grosser at the UK box office in 1982. (Another source put it 10th highest.)

In the UK it returned £388,521 to distributors. Filmink argued "it might’ve done more and launched Lewis Collins as the action star that he should have been, had it not been so sloppily written."

=== Critical reception ===
Film critic Roger Ebert of the Chicago Sun-Times said: "There are so many errors of judgment, strategy, behavior and simple plausibility in this movie that we just give up and wait for it to end. You know you're in trouble when the movie's audience knows more about terrorism than the terrorists do."

Who Dares Wins was panned by some critics as being right-wing. Sight & Sound described the film as "hawkish". Derek Malcolm in The Guardian called the film "truly dreadful".

The Washington Post enjoyed the final assault, describing it as "a pip", and praised the authenticity of the action sequences, but thought "an awful lot of talky, slack footage accumulates before this whirlwind payoff" and that the "storytelling rhythm is defective."

Within days of the film's release, producer Lloyd allegedly received a phone call from Stanley Kubrick praising the film and calling the casting of Judy Davis "inspirational". This claim has been strongly contested by Kubrick's assistant Anthony Frewin, saying that, "Lloyd, as the gunnery [sergeant] in Full Metal Jacket would say, is blowing smoke up our asses. That film is the antithesis of everything Stanley stood for and believed in."

=== Reagan administration ===
Soon after the film was completed, copies of it were requested for viewing by the White House; it was seen by Ronald Reagan and his advisers at Camp David and they reportedly enjoyed the film. It was also enjoyed by Alexander Haig, Reagan's former Secretary of State, who had recently joined the board of MGM/UA. In an interview, Haig praised the film as a "terribly exciting drama... a realistic portrayal of the world in which we live." On his recommendation, MGM/UA bought the film for distribution in the U.S., retitling it The Final Option.

=== Controversy ===
At the premiere people protested against the film because it allegedly painted the Campaign for Nuclear Disarmament as terrorists. In a 2021 interview, director Ian Sharp said: "This is one of the confusing things (...) In the film the point is that the CND is infiltrated by the terrorists. They are using a legitimate cause for their terrorism. When they are doing their machine gunning practice, they’re using CND symbols to shoot at, to show their contempt. I don’t know how they missed all the signs." In the same interview he conceded: "It’s probably my own fault. It was clear to me, but I misjudged it."

== Proposed follow-up ==
Lloyd signed Lewis Collins to a three-picture contract on the basis of his performance. The films were to be The Wild Geese 2, Battle for the Falklands (about the Special Boat Service during the Falklands War), and Macau. Collins ended up not appearing in the first film and the other two were never made.
