= Anita Patti Brown =

American singer (c. 1870 – 1950)

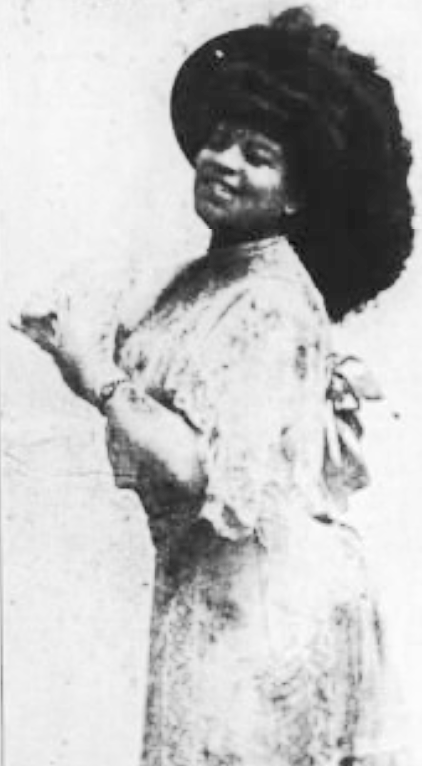
- Anita Patti Brown, from a 1911 newspaper
- Born: Patsie Bush or Patsie Dean about 1870; Georgia, US
- Died: December 27, 1950 (aged about 80); Chicago, Illinois, US
- Occupation: Singer
- Years active: 1900s–1930s

Anita Patti Brown (born about 1870, died December 27, 1950) was an American concert singer. She was sometimes billed as "the Bronze Tetrazzini".

== Early life ==
Patsie Bush or Patsie Dean was born in Georgia, and raised in Chattanooga, Tennessee. She trained as a singer in Chicago, and later studied in Europe with Victor Beigel.

== Career ==
Brown made her Chicago debut in 1903, at the Chicago Opera House. She sang in Nashville in 1909, assisted by the Fisk Quartette. She was described as "one of the most noted singers of the Race" when she appeared in Pittsburgh in 1911. She sang at a benefit concert in Alabama in 1913. In 1913 she appeared at the annual Atlanta Colored Music Festival, as featured soloist alongside Roland Hayes. In 1914 she sang in a concert of Black composers in Chicago, sharing the bill with pianist Robert Nathaniel Dett and others.

Brown sang in New York and Dallas in 1915. She toured in South America and the British West Indies, and made a recording for Victor, in 1916. She gave a concert at Poro College in St. Louis in 1918, and after World War I toured with a military band. She sang at church events in Spokane in 1921 and 1923. Her 1922 Los Angeles appearance prompted a reviewer to note that she was "a genuine prima donna" with "a dulcet voice of rare soprano altitude". She sang in Chattanooga in 1929. In 1934, she was featured at the annual meeting of the National Association of Negro Musicians, held in Pittsburgh.

In 1920, Brown began "Patti's Brazilian Toilette Luxuries", a mail-order business selling cosmetics and perfume. In 1923, she successfully sued a Chicago drug store for refusing her service. In the 1930s, she taught voice students at her Chicago studio.

== Personal life ==
Patsie Bush (or Patsie Dean) married Chicago choral director Arthur A. Brown. She died at home in Chicago in 1950, about 80 years old, though her Chicago Tribune obituary gave her age as 65 years.
