= John Goss (baritone) =

English baritone (1894–1953)

John Goss (10 May 1894 – 13 February 1953) was a baritone recital singer and teacher. He was a key figure in 1920s English musical life, befriending composers such as Rebecca Clarke, Frederick Delius, Bernard van Dieren, E J Moeran and Peter Warlock. He became well known for his concerts mixing classical lieder and English art song with what he called "sociable songs" - folk song, popular drinking songs, army songs and sea shanties. He moved to Canada in 1939, where he stayed until 1950.

== England ==
Born in London, Goss only took up singing as a profession while in his mid-20s. Before that he had studied at Ruskin College, Oxford and worked at a variety of labouring jobs. His teachers were Victor Beigel and Reinhold von Warlich. His first engagement as vocalist was with a touring concert party, The Buskins. Goss built his reputation from 1920 onwards as a recitalist (he never performed in opera or oratorio), touring extensively in Europe, the US, Japan and Canada. Hubert Foss was his frequent accompanist in the UK.

As a well-known bon vivant he became a key member of the Peter Warlock circle and championed the set of English composers surrounding Warlock at that time. He was a frequent visitor to Warlock's cottage in Eynsford, Kent. Goss sang in the second performance of Warlock's The Curlew, at the Hyde Park Hotel on 31 January 1923 with the Charles Woodhouse string quartet and Léon Goossens playing the cor anglais.

Goss helped revive the British ballad form through his recordings for His Master's Voice in 1925 at its Hayes recording studios with the Cathedral Male Quartet, and (in the 1930s) with the London Singers. He also helped Warlock with the revival of interest in Jacobean and Elizabethan lute songs. He recorded a sequence of Warlock songs for His Master's Voice in 1928.

Although married at the time, between 1927 and 1933 he was romantically involved with the composer Rebecca Clarke. Two of her songs were dedicated to him: "June Twilight" and "The Seal Man". Her "Tiger, Tiger", finished at the time the relationship was ending, proved to be her last composition for solo voice until the early 1940s.

Goss became interested in the music of Delius through his friendship with Warlock. He performed in two broadcast premieres at the Delius Festival of 1929, on 18 October at Queen's Hall: Arabesk for baritone, chorus and orchestra, and Cynara for baritone and orchestra, with the British Broadcasting Orchestra and London Select Choir, conducted by Thomas Beecham.

He was active in left wing politics his entire life. In London in 1938 he joined the Communist Party of Great Britain and formed the Unity Theatre Male Voice Choir. But clashes over repertoire with the committee organising the 1939 Festival of Music for the People, dominated by Alan Bush, led to his withdrawal and prompted his move to Canada just before the war.

== Canada ==
Goss had first performed in Canada in 1929 at the Vancouver Sea Festival, as part of his North American tour. Healey Willan dedicated four songs to him that year. He made frequent high-profile appearances there in the 1930s, including with the Toronto Symphony Orchestra and the Winnipeg Male Voice Choir. Goss was touring in Canada when war was declared, and took up residence in Vancouver. He gave recitals, adjudicated at festivals and taught privately. He formed the John Goss Studio Singers in Vancouver. His political activities continued through his involvement with the Canadian Federation of Music Teachers, as a member of the Labour-Progressive Party (the legal front of the Communist Party in Canada) and (from 1944) as a co-founder and president of the Labor Arts Guild.

== Return to the UK ==
While attending a peace conference in New York in 1949, Goss was evicted from America due to his Communist sympathies and sent back to Canada. The negative publicity proved to be a barrier to future employment there, so he returned to England in 1950 to live in Edgbaston, Birmingham. After more than a decade away he was by then largely forgotten in the UK. He performed at the Festival of Britain in 1951. One of his last recitals took place in Birmingham on 14 October 1952, with accompanist Philip Cranmer, performing songs by van Dieren, Dowland, Purcell, Schumann and Beethoven.

He died in Birmingham only three years after his return, aged 58. A memorial concert organised by the Workers Musical Association took place at the French Institute in London on 13 February 1955. Ten years after his death his friend, the composer Elizabeth Poston said in a 1964 BBC broadcast:

John's voice was not a great one: it was a light baritone with a high range, extraordinary flexibility and beauty of tone. I've heard greater singers: I've never been more moved by any. It was he, more than any other singer, who did most for English song in the years following the First World War.

== Publications ==
Goss' publications include The Daily Express Community Songbook (1927), The Weekend Book (with Vera Mendel and Francis Meynell), An Anthology of Song (1929) and Ballads of Britain (1937). A satirical novel, Cockroaches and Diamonds, was written while he was in Japan and published in 1937. Goss was about halfway through writing an autobiography at the time of his death.

In Tony Britten's film Some Little Joy (2005) on the life of Peter Warlock, John Goss is played by the baritone Giles Davies.
