= Museum of Music History =

Online museum

- Established: 2003
- Location: Online
- Type: Music and music history
- Collection size: 70,000+ artifacts
- Director: Kate Kennedy
- Website: https://momh.org.uk/

The Museum of Music History (MOMH) is an online museum and research centre dedicated to the history and development of music in the UK since the seventeenth century. MOMH has a large archival collection relating to British music, including composition, performance, and instruments. The Museum was founded in 2003 by Oliver Davies and John Cruft, under the patronage of Sir Charles Mackerras.

Oliver Davies made numerous acquisitions specifically for MOMH, and following his death the administrators of his estate presented his remarkable personal collection of musical instruments, scores, ephemera, and publications to the Museum, effectively its founding collection. Davies was also responsible for steering numerous important bequests to the Museum. The current holdings include 21 individual collections, with over 70,000 artefacts spanning four centuries of music history. The Museum publishes monthly online exhibitions on their website, drawn from its collections and detailing the stories of composers, musicians, institutions, and instruments.

Until 2020, MOMH was an entirely volunteer-run organisation, with negligible income, but the generosity of Oliver Davies’ family and a significant bequest from Paul Strang (1933-2024), have enabled the appointments of key staff.

The Museum is expanding its archival collection by processing the hundreds of thousands of documents currently in its possession being held at storage facilities around London. An online archive is available to researchers and interested members of the public to request documents and viewing appointments.

== History ==
=== Early history, 2003–2020 ===
The Museum was founded by Oliver Davies (1938-2020) and a group of fellow enthusiasts chaired by John Cruft (1914-2008), formerly director of music at the British Council and then at the Arts Council, in 2003, under the patronage of Sir Charles Mackerras (1925–2010). The idea grew out of a discussion chaired by the late John Cruft, a former music director of the Arts Council of Great Britain, on Britain's need for a comprehensive and fully accessible music and dance museum. Other major cities in Europe were seen to have flourishing museums of music, but London, despite its significant role in music history, lacked a similar national institution outside of its conservatoire collections. A music museum was, in fact, planned by Prince Albert for the South Kensington Estate, and when the Royal College of Music eventually opened there in 1883, one of its guiding principles was to combine musical instruction with illustration. While the Royal College eventually assembled an impressive music history collection of, it has never had the funds or space to fully realise Prince Albert's original intention. The goal of the Museum of Music History's founders, then, was to establish a comprehensive music museum in the mould of Paris' Cité de la Musique, Vienna's Haus der Musik, and Milan's Scala Museum.

The distinguished musicologist Dr. Stanley Sadie (1930–2005) was appointed as the second chair in the early 2000s, and an Advisory Committee of friends, experts, collectors, and frequent collaborators in different areas of musical expertise was convened to help steer the Museum towards its goal of promoting general understanding of music, while asserting Britain's role in European and global music history. Gifts began to be offered to the Museum as soon as it was established, and the early years saw the acquisition of several prominent private collections, as well as pledges for further bequests. During this early period in the Museum's history, much of its organisation and reach depended entirely on the personal and professional connections of a core group of individuals, including Oliver Davies.

Paul Strang (1933-2024), who had been involved with MOMH from the outset, became Chairman in 2005. By profession a solicitor, he had however an intimate connection with the world of music from birth. He was the illegitimate son of Sir Thomas Beecham (1879-1961), the best known conductor and impresario of the period, and the soprano Dora Labbette (1898-1984) 3 , and grew up in the company of distinguished musicians. In later life he devoted much time to supporting musical initiatives, as Chairman of Trinity College of Music, proponent and supporter of the Kathleen Ferrier Prize, a generous sponsor of young musicians and an early friend of MOMH, presenting significant material to the collection.

Mark Bromley joined the Museum of Music History (MOMH) Advisory Committee in 2005 as a business adviser, where he was an early advocate for developing the organisation as an online resource for the general public. Working with Augustine Ford, he helped introduce the concept of an "Exhibition of the Month," broadening access to the collection through regular digital showcases. After serving on the Advisory Committee for five years, Bromley rejoined MOMH as a trustee in 2020 and was appointed Chair in 2021, succeeding Paul Strang.

=== Professionalisation and development, 2020s–present ===
After two decades of collecting and slowly growing the Museum's holdings, the Board of Trustees took steps to realise MOMH's potential and founding goals by bringing in a general manager and Curator to devote more time to the Museum's development. This effort coincided with the passing of Oliver Davies in 2020 and was carried out in his memory. Trustee Nicholas Roberts (of the Coull Quartet) brought in Dr Kate Kennedy, Director of the Oxford Centre for Life Writing for her experience in musicology, public engagement, and fundraising. The Board of Trustees undertook to institutionalise the Museum's efforts over the past two decades, including creating a professional archive and undertaking enhanced fundraising activities to establish MOMH as a national center for engagement with music history.

== Governance ==
Since 2004 the Museum of Music History has been registered as a charitable company (Registered Charity No.1104280 and a Company limited by Guarantee No.04757833). Overseen by a board of trustees, the Museum is managed by General Manager Dr Kate Kennedy, Hon. Curators Nick Roberts and Adrian Bradbury, the Curator, as well as Archivist Dr Max Ferrer. There is a team of volunteers that assists in cataloguing and preserving manuscripts, and from internships for British and American students.

== Collections ==
In addition to bequeathing the substantial personal collection he developed over many years, Oliver Davies received numerous large and important donations to the Museum. Many came from the estates of distinguished musicians, scholars and collectors such as Thomas Beecham, Yehudi Menuhin, Beatrice Harrison, Marie Hall, Lawrance Collingwood, Philip Jones, Carl Dolmetsch, Margaret Campbell, John Watt and Emmie Tillett. Significant acquisitions include an Erard square piano (1808) owned by Napoleon, a Broadwood grand piano (1850) used by William Sterndale Bennett, a portrait of Sir George Grove (1861) by Sir Henry Phillips and reconstructions of rare medieval instruments donated by Mary Remnant.

The Museum has also entered into agreements with various music groups across the UK to rescue and house its archives. These include the English Chamber Orchestra, Harrison Sisters' Trust Archive, and Sinfonia Smith Square, among others.

The result is a repository of musical scores, performance programs, rare books, recordings, instruments, personal papers, and more.

MOMH's list of collections includes documents of or relating to:

- Oliver Davies
- Beatrice Harrison
- Sir Thomas Beacham
- Sinfonia Smith Square
- St. John's Smith Square
- Ibbs and Tillett Agency
- Samuel Coleridge Taylor
- The English Chamber Orchestra
- Mary Remnant
- John Watt
- Eugen Goossens
- Jenny Bisset (Ballet Photographer)

It also houses large collections of:

- Rare 19^{th-}century piano music
- 100+ Instruments
- 200+ portraits and busts
- Opera scores and recordings

== Exhibitions ==
Since the late 2000s the Museum of Music History has prepared monthly online exhibitions which are available on its website. Today, this collection contains over 200 individual exhibitions covering subjects from the mid-eighteenth century to present. In addition to these online exhibitions, MOMH has also hosted travelling exhibitions at festivals around the UK. These include a display on Samuel Coleridge Taylor for the Black Voices Festival in Bedford, a Women in Music exhibition for the Doreen Carwithen Festival in Haddenham, as well as further exhibitions on Beatrice Harrison and Mary Remnant. MOHM's website also contains online galleries, composed of images from the Museum's collections. Categories of these online galleries include Music and Graphic Design; Music and Social History; Music for Children; and Social Dance.
