= Victor Beigel =

English pianist and singing teacher of Hungarian descent

Victor Beigel (19 May 1870 – 7 November 1930) was an English pianist and singing teacher of Hungarian descent.

Beigel was an internationally renowned vocal pedagogue. Friendships connected him with the painter John Singer Sargent, the interior designer Sybil Colefax and the composers John Ireland and Percy Grainger, whose choir rehearsals he accompanied on the piano for years. He was also a friend of his student Gervase Elwes, after whose death in 1921 he founded the Gervase Elwes Memorial Fund (later the Musicians Benevolent Fund) to support young musicians. His students included Lauritz Melchior, Anita Patti Brown, John Goss and Monica Harrison. During the First World War, he gave and organised benefit concerts in support of the "Wounded Soldiers Concert Fund".

Beigel died in Elstead at the age of 60.

== Sources ==
- Karl Dreyfus (ed.): Percy Aldridge Grainger: "Farthest North of Humanness: Letters", Springer 1985, ISBN 9781349076277, p. 206
