= Beatrice Harrison =

British cellist (1892–1965)

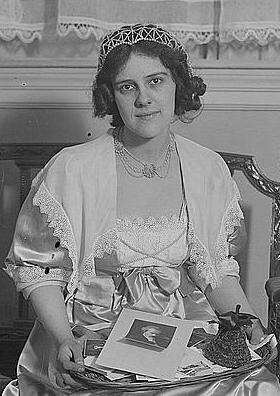

Background information
- Born: 9 December 1892; Roorkee, British India
- Died: 10 March 1965 (aged 72) Surrey, England
- Instrument: Cello

Beatrice Harrison (9 December 1892 – 10 March 1965) was a British cellist active in the first half of the 20th century. She gave first performances of several important English works, especially those of Frederick Delius, and made the first or standard recordings of others, particularly the first recording of Edward Elgar's cello concerto in 1920, with the composer conducting.

== Biography ==
=== Early training ===
Beatrice Harrison was born in Roorkee, north-west India. Her parents were Colonel John Harrison, posted to India at the time of Beatrice's birth, and Annie Harrison, who had studied singing with Sir George Henschel and Gustave Garcia, but gave up hopes of a career after her marriage. The Harrison family moved back to England during her childhood and she studied at the Royal College of Music, London, and afterwards under Hugo Becker, and at the High School of Music in Berlin. In 1910 she won the Mendelssohn Prize, and made her debut in the Bechstein Hall, Berlin.

=== A musical family ===
Beatrice was the sister of May Harrison, violinist, a student of Leopold Auer; Margaret Harrison, a pianist, but perhaps better known as a breeder of Irish Wolfhounds and a dog show judge; and the mezzo-soprano Monica Harrison. Like the family of Mark Hambourg, this was one in which the children were taught separate instruments so that they could play in ensemble. May had once stood in for Fritz Kreisler in a Mendelssohn concert in Helsingfors (Helsinki). Both May and Beatrice won the Gold Medal of the Associated Board for violin and cello respectively.

Hugo Becker had spoken to Sir Henry Wood of his admiration for Beatrice Harrison's playing even before her debut under his baton in 1911, playing Dvořák, Haydn and Tchaikovsky. Wood, Charles Villiers Stanford and Edward Elgar were all great admirers. Stanford's Ballata and Ballabile, op. 160, was written for Harrison and first heard on 3 May 1919 at the Wigmore Hall, using a piano reduction. The Harrison family became friends with Roger Quilter and his circle (including members of the Frankfurt Group) through the Soldiers' concerts in 1916. On 11 March 1918, Beatrice performed Dvořák's Cello Concerto in B minor with the Royal Philharmonic Orchestra under Thomas Beecham.

=== First performances of the Delius repertoire ===
Harrison attracted wider attention as the first performer of Delius's Cello Sonata (Wigmore Hall, 31 October 1918). On 11 November, May gave the first performance of the Delius Violin Sonata No. 1, which she later recorded with Arnold Bax at the piano. Roger Quilter attended both performances, for they were also playing his music in concerts at that time. The Violin Concerto, written at Grez-sur-Loing in 1919, had its first performance at Queen's Hall with Albert Sammons (the dedicatee) under Adrian Boult in the same year. Beatrice and her sister gave the first performance of Delius's Double Concerto (which he had completed in 1915 and dedicated to them) in his presence at a Queen's Hall Symphony Concert in January 1920. After this, Delius returned to Grez and, at Beatrice Harrison's request, began work on his Cello Concerto. She performed the Cello Sonata at a concert in Paris on 8 June. After two months' uninterrupted work in his Hampstead flat, Delius finished the concerto in the spring of 1921, and it was performed by the cellist whom Sir Thomas Beecham called 'this talented lady.' When Delius's remains were re-buried according to his wishes in a southern English country churchyard, on 24 May 1935, the village chosen was Limpsfield near the Harrison home at Oxted in Surrey: Beatrice Harrison played after the service, at which Thomas Beecham gave the oration.

=== The Elgar concerto ===
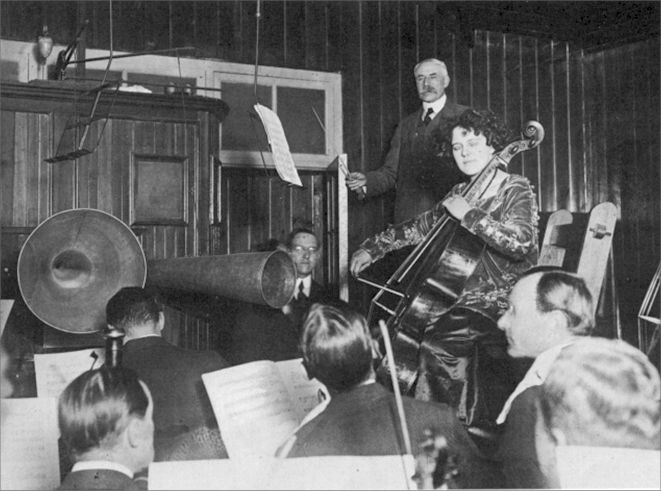
Harrison and Elgar on the recording session of Elgar's Cello Concerto, at His Master's Voice studio, November 1920

At the Three Choirs Festival in Hereford in 1921, Harrison gave the first festival performance of Elgar's Cello Concerto outside London. By 1924, she had toured Europe and America, and in November 1925, she returned to the Royal Philharmonic for an all-Elgar concert, performing the Cello Concerto under Elgar's direction. The composer had specifically requested that Harrison be the soloist whenever he conducted the piece, after she had studied it with him before making an abridged pre-electric recording. At this event, Elgar was awarded the Gold Medal by Henry Wood on behalf of the Society. A year or two later, with the advent of electrical recording enhancing the technical capabilities of the gramophone, Harrison was selected to make the 'official' His Master's Voice recording of the concerto, with Elgar conducting.

In 1929 at the Harrogate festival, she was a contributor at a festival concert of works associated with the Frankfurt Group (Quilter and colleagues), and in 1933 Quilter re-arranged his 'L'Amour de moy' for her for a broadcast.

=== '... a nightingale singing along with her' ===
Harrison's performances became well known through broadcast in the early days of BBC sound radio. She made one of the BBC's earliest live outside broadcasts in May 1924 when she sat and played her cello in the garden of her house Foyle Riding (Note: The house was at 51.2314°N 0.0143°E.) at Oxted, duetting with nightingales. 'A few years later, recordings of Beatrice Harrison with the nightingales were made by His Master's Voice. These were made available on the standard 10-inch shellac gramophone discs, and proved extremely popular.' These recordings were made on 3 May 1927, with a further session on 9 May. The first published recordings were put on sale in June 1927; they included the Northern Irish folk song Londonderry Air (the tune of Danny Boy) coupled with Chant Hindu from the opera Sadko (Rimsky-Korsakov) issued on His Master's Voice B2470, together with a recording of singing nightingales coupled with a soundscape titled "Dawn in an Old World Garden", issued on His Master's Voice B 2469. A further recording made at the same time, Songs my mother taught me (Dvořák), which was coupled with another soundscape recording, was issued on His Master's Voice B2853 and put on sale in November 1928. Records were also issued of the nightingales singing alone and of the dawn chorus from Harrison's garden.

The BBC had no viable means of recording sound until 1930. In April 2022, the BBC used one of the His Master's Voice recordings of 1927 believing it to be their own recording of the 1924 broadcast. They compounded this error by broadcasting a programme in which Professor Tim Birkhead FRS, a guest on the programme, stated his belief that the duets had been faked with the use of a voice artist who he suggested could be the variety performer Maude Gould. Although this claim has been widely reported, no documentary evidence has been produced to support it. Contemporary accounts, including Harrison's letters, are held at the Museum of Music History, Dorking, and cellist Kate Kennedy says that these disprove that a bird impersonator was used.

=== Wartime again ===
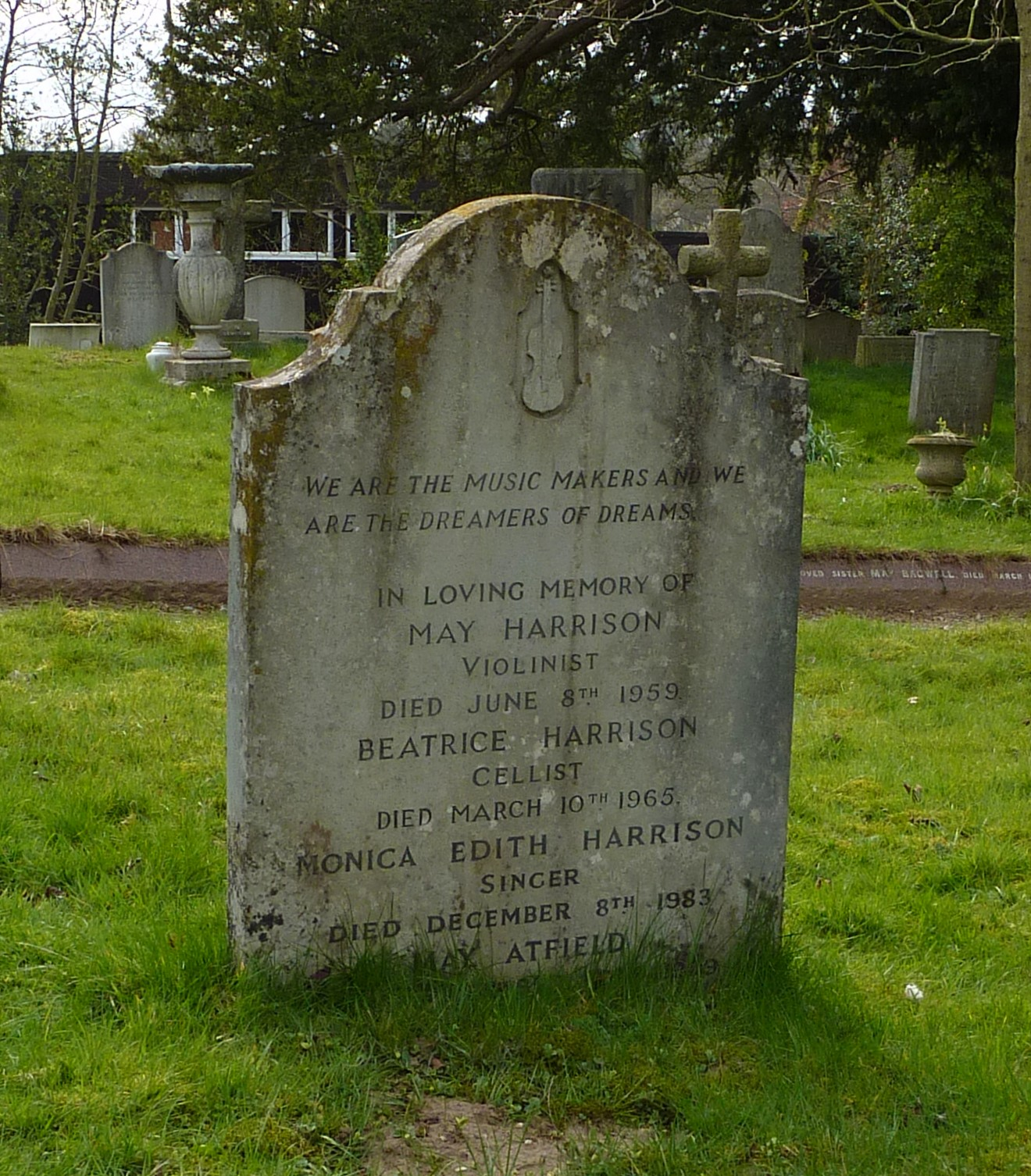
Beatrice Harrison's grave at St Peter's Church in Limpsfield, Surrey, photographed in 2013

The Elgar Concerto was, perhaps inevitably, the work with which she was most closely identified, not least in her performances for Henry Wood. There was a very successful performance in August 1937, and another at the Elgar Concert of 27 August 1940, with the London Symphony Orchestra, in the old Queen's Hall, less than a year before it was destroyed by German bombing. On this occasion the soloist's style was particularly animated, causing her ringlets to 'dance' in such a way that the orchestral players were distracted. During the concert, there was a rattle of gunfire outside and plaster fell inside the hall. Sir Henry considered her performance the finest he had ever directed. She was one of the English soloists who took part in Wood's last season in July 1944, a month before his death.

Beatrice Harrison owned and played a cello made by Pietro Guarneri (Pietro da Venezia) (1695–1762).

She died in Surrey in 1965. She is buried in the churchyard of St Peter's, Limpsfield, near Sir Thomas Beecham and other prominent musicians.

== Centenary Concert ==
On 9 December 1992 at the Wigmore Hall, the Beatrice Harrison Centenary Concert was given by cellist Julian Lloyd Webber and pianist John Lenehan. The programme consisted of works especially associated with the cellist, including the Cello Sonata by John Ireland (which she premiered in April 1924) and the Delius Sonata, as well as "Pastoral and Reel" by Cyril Scott, which Lloyd Webber played with Harrison's sister, Margaret, on the piano.

== Recordings ==
(Not a complete list)

- Elgar: Cello concerto (New Symphony Orchestra cond. by Edward Elgar) His Master's Voice D1507-9 (3 records, 1928)
- Delius: Cello Sonata (w. Harold Craxton, pno) His Master's Voice D1103-4 (2 records).
- Delius: Elegie, and Caprice (Orchestra cond. by Eric Fenby) His Master's Voice B3721 (1 record).
- Delius: Entr'acte and Serenade from Hassan Incidental Music (w. Margaret Harrison, pno). His Master's Voice B3274 (1 record).
- Nightingales/Londonderry Air/Chant Hindu His Master's Voice B2470 10"
- Dawn in an old world garden/Nightingales His Master's Voice B2469 10"
- Nightingales/Songs my mother taught me etc. His Master's Voice B2853 102

== In literature ==
- Beatrice Harrison's performances with nightingales formed the subject of a poem by Robert Saxton, "The Nightingale Broadcasts", which won the 2001 Prize of the Keats-Shelley Memorial Association.
- Her nightingale recordings were the inspiration for a 2004 play by Patricia Cleveland Peck, The Cello and the Nightingale
- Beatrice Harrison's performances with nightingales are referred to as a dramatic device in order to introduce an episode with nightingales in John Preston's 2007 novel The Dig.

== Sources ==
- Beecham, T. Frederick Delius (London: Hutchinson & Co, 1959)
- Darrell, R.T. The Gramophone Shop Encyclopedia of Recorded Music (New York: 1936)
- Arthur Eaglefield Hull (ed.), A Dictionary of Modern Music and Musicians (London: Dent, 1924)
- Elkin, R. Royal Philharmonic, The Annals of the Royal Philharmonic Society (London: Rider & Co, 1946)
- Langfield, V. Roger Quilter, His Life and Music (Woodbridge, UK: Boydell, 2002)
- Pound, R. Sir Henry Wood (London: Cassell, 1969)
- Wood, H. My Life of Music (London: Gollancz, 1938)
- Harrison, Beatrice. The Cello and the Nightingales. The Autobiography of Beatrice Harrison. Edited by Patricia Cleveland-Peck; foreword by Julian Lloyd Webber (London: John Murray, 1985)
- "The Harrison Sisters Issue", The Delius Society Journal, Autumn 1985, number 87
