= The Curlew =

The Curlew is a song cycle by Peter Warlock on poems by W. B. Yeats. It is generally considered one of the composer's finest works.

It was written between 1920 and 1922 for singer and an unusual accompanying group of flute, cor anglais and string quartet (two violins, viola and cello). Warlock completed the work in Cefn Bryntalch, his family home in Llandyssil, near Montgomery in Wales.

There are four songs, with a short instrumental interlude. The poems they are based on (with the first line in parentheses) are:

1. "He Reproves the Curlew" ("O Curlew, cry no more in the air")
2. "The lover mourns for the loss of love" ("Pale brows, still hands and dim hair")
3. "The Withering of the Boughs" ("I cried when the moon was murmuring to the birds:")
4. Interlude
5. "He Hears the Cry of the Sedge" ("I wander by the edge of this desolate lake")

"The Withering of the Boughs" was taken from In the Seven Woods, while the other poems were taken from The Wind Among the Reeds.

There is a lengthy instrumental introduction to the first song, in which the cry of the curlew is represented by the cor anglais and the peewit by the flute. The songs, which concern lost love, are melancholy in mood. A number of motif elements recur throughout the songs dependent on the point in the text – a structural technique also found in many others of Warlock's songs. The cycle lasts around twenty-five minutes.

Four of the songs later to be incorporated into the cycle were performed by Gerald Cooper on 6 October 1920 at the Mortimer Hall in London. The first complete performance took place on 23 November 1922, sung by Philip Wilson. Warlock wrote to his mentor Colin Taylor: "for the first time in my life I really feel pleased with something I have written. Wilson buggered up the voice part completely but the instrumentalists were fine. It's going to be given again in January with another singer, John Goss, who will do it far better". The performance with John Goss took place on 31 January, 1923 at the Hyde Park Hotel.

The Curlew won the Carnegie Award in 1923. In making the award the trustees wrote: 'A most imaginative setting of Mr Yeats's poems, of which, indeed, it may be regarded as the musical counterpart. It is pervaded by a keen feeling for harmonic colour, which is here used to most appropriate effect'.

== Recordings ==
The Curlew was well served by the gramophone, three excellent recordings having been made within the first thirty years after its composition:

- John Armstrong (tenor), Robert Murchie (flute), T. McDonagh (English horn), International String Quartet (Mangeot, Price, Bray, Shineburne) conducted by Constant Lambert (National Gramophonic Society 163–165). This recording was made with the personnel who gave the notable Warlock Memorial performance on 23 February 1931 at the Wigmore Hall, to preserve the benefit of their rehearsed ensemble.
- René Soames (tenor), Geoffrey Gilbert (flute), Léon Goossens (English horn), Aeolian String Quartet (Cave, Williams, Forbes, Moore) (HMV 3 × 12-inch 78 rpm discs C 7934-36) (27 March and 12 April 1950). Recorded under auspices of the British Council.
- Alexander Young (tenor), Lionel Solomon (flute), Peter Graeme (English horn), Sebastian String Quartet (Argo LP RG 26) (January 1954)
- There are numerous more recent recordings.
