= Kynance Mews =

Mews street in South Kensington, London

Coordinates: 51°29′50.51″N 0°11′8.23″W

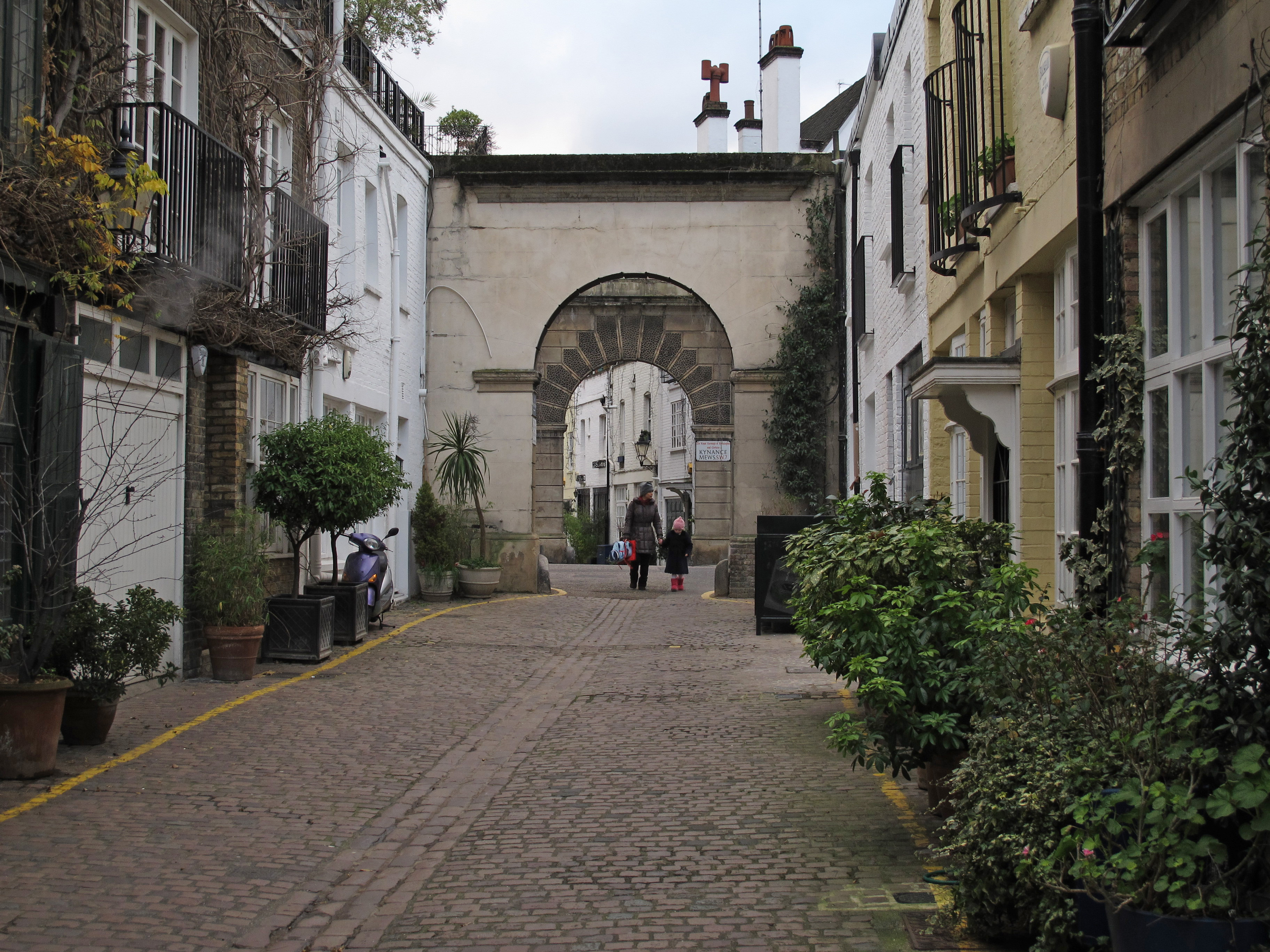
- The two arches on Launceston Place from the western end of Kynance Mews

- Location within Greater London

History
- Built: 1862–1879; 147 years ago

Site notes
- Architect: Thomas Cundy III

Listed Building – Grade II
- Official name: Entrance arch from Gloucester Road
- Designated: 6 August 1973
- Reference no.: 1266548

Listed Building – Grade II
- Official name: East entrance arch from Launceston Place
- Designated: 6 August 1973
- Reference no.: 1225050

Listed Building – Grade II
- Official name: West entrance arch from Launceston Place
- Designated: 6 August 1973
- Reference no.: 1225051

Kynance Mews is a mews street in South Kensington district of the Royal Borough of Kensington and Chelsea in London, SW7. The mews consists of 33 residential properties on a setted road that passes from Gloucester Road on the east, before being bisected by Launceston Place, with the western end of the mews ending in a cul-de-sac. The entrances to the mews pass through three arches, each listed Grade II on the National Heritage List for England. The arches were built c. 1860 to a design by Thomas Cundy III.

David Tucker in his 2009 book London Walks: London Stories wrote that Kensington is home to the "prettiest and most unusual" mews, and that Kynance Mews was the mews for those who want "sheer rustic rose-petal-perfect-pretty". In their 1982 book The Mews of London, Barbara Rosen and Wolfgang Zuckermann wrote that upon entering the western end of the mews from Launceston Place, "one can easily forget London and imagine oneself in a village deep in the English countryside". The mews is a popular place for Instagram photographs; having been described as "Insta-famous" and has been listed as one of the most "instagrammable" places to photograph wisteria in London by the Evening Standard.

== Location ==
Kynance Mews is located in London's Kensington district, bisected by Launceston Place. The Gloucester Road adjoins the east end of the east part of the mews. Part of the north wall of the western end backs onto the grounds of Christ Church on the corner of Victoria and Eldon Road, the church is accessible through a set of steps in the west end of the mews. The mews is part of the De Vere Conservation Area.

== History ==
It was known as Cornwall Mews until 1924, having been built as stabling for the Cornwall Gardens development to the south by the builders Welchman and Gale between 1862 and 1879. The mews served as the stabling for Welchman and Gale's Cornwall Gardens development. The houses are two or three storeys in height.

Bruce Chatwin lived at No. 9 for a year from April 1969, and later shared the property with the antiques expert Oliver Hoare.

The freehold of a property "requiring modernisation" on Kynance Mews was listed for sale for £9,000 in 1969 (equivalent to £130,770 in 2025), with the rental price of a house listed at £40 per week in 1971. By August 1991 the freehold of the "largest house at the prettiest end of the mews" was listed at £325,000 (equivalent to £747,486 in 2025). The average price of a house on the mews was £2.3 million in 2018.

== Filming location ==
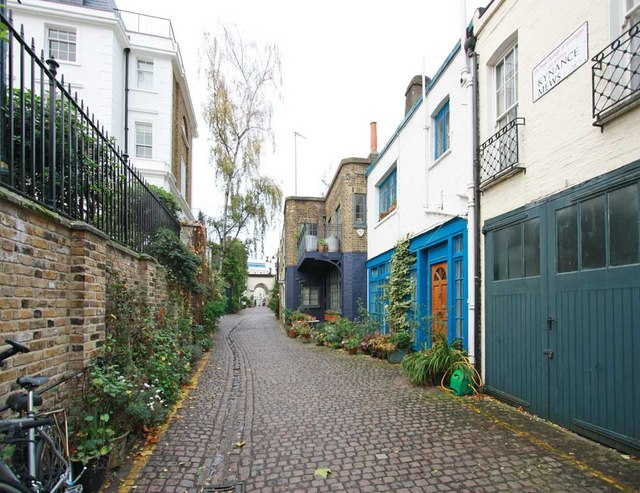
Kynance Mews

Several films have been shot on location on Kynance Mews. Bell Cottage, No. 13, is the home of Julie Andrews's character in Star! (1968), and a bus picks people up from the mews in a late scene in the film. The hostage taking in the 1982 film Who Dares Wins occurs at No. 25. Pamela Stephenson lives at No. 23 in 1984's Scandalous and Susan George cycles from No. 21 during the opening credits of the 1969 film Twinky. Janet Suzman runs down the mews in the 1974 film The Black Windmill, and Robert Mitchum and Derek Deadman emerge from the western end of the mews in 1978's The Big Sleep.

On the eastern side of the mews from Launceston Place, No 4. was home to Leslie Phillips and Julie Christie in Crooks Anonymous (1962), although the night scenes were filmed in a studio recreation of the mews. No. 10 was the home of Juliette Binoche's character in the 1992 film Damage.

The Mews is home to protagonist Joe in You (season 4).
