= Limpsfield Grange School =

Location
- 89 Bluehouse Lane; Oxted, Surrey, RH8 0RZ; England

Information
- Type: Special school
- Established: 1953
- Department for Education URN: 125459 Tables
- Ofsted: Reports
- Head teacher: Sarah Wild
- Gender: Girls
- Age: 11 to 16
- Enrollment: 94 (April 2025)
- Website: limpsfieldgrange.co.uk

Limpsfield Grange School is a special school in the village of Limpsfield, near Oxted in Surrey, England. It caters for autistic girls aged 11 to 16, offering day and boarding places. It is funded by Surrey County Council.

The school has a capacity of 94 students. Plans to expand the school with an extra 60 places and sixth form provision were approved in January 2022, but were later cancelled due to insufficient council funds.

== History ==
Limpsfield Grange was established in 1953 as an open air school, educating girls with respiratory conditions such as asthma.

The school was the focus of the 2015 ITV documentary Girls with Autism.
