= Fritz-Otto Busch =

German naval writer (1890–1971)

Fritz-Otto Busch (30 December 1890 in Lindenthal, Cologne – 5 July 1971 in Limpsfield, Surrey) was a German naval officer in the Imperial German Navy, the Reichsmarine and the Kriegsmarine, as well as a translator and a maritime and naval writer. He was a committed Nazi and had an influential role in the Nazification of the German P.E.N. from 1933 onwards. He used the pseudonyms Peter Cornelissen and Wilhelm Wolfslast.

== Life ==
Busch was the son of Alfred Busch, a bank manager, and his wife Eugenie Schick. After completing his secondary education, he spent two semesters at a university. His younger brother, Harald Busch (1904-1983) was an art historian who was in charge of the Hamburg Art Gallery from 1934 to 1935. During the Second World War both brothers served in a propaganda company in which they played down the role of the Wehrmacht on behalf of the Propaganda Ministry and praised the camaraderie of army life.

In 1912 Busch joined the Imperial Navy as an officer candidate. During the First World War he took part in the Battle of Jutland as a sub-lieutenant on the battleship SMS Oldenburg. From spring 1917 to summer 1918 he was an artillery officer on the Light Cruiser SMS Regensburg holding the rank of second lieutenant. During this time, from 27 June to 14 July 1918 he also saw service in Flanders. He then saw service on the minelaying light cruiser SMS Bremse, experiencing the 1918 Mutiny and the end of the war. He was awarded the Iron Cross 1st and 2nd Class and the Friedrich-August Cross 2nd Class. In 1919 he married Ada von dem Knesebeck, Baroness of Bittersdorf. His first son, Ulf was born in 1920, the first of three children. Busch served in the navy of the Weimar Republic until 1928, holding the rank of Korvettenkapitän when he left. After the outbreak of war on 1 September 1939 he was recalled to service, and on 4 September 1939 he experienced the first British air attack. Subsequently he was returned to the reserve.

== Literary and political activities ==
Right from the start of the Weimar Republic Busch was active in spreading propaganda. He was influential in the creation of the myth that the German navy had won the Battle of Jutland. This can also be seen in his article "SMS Regensburg in the last sortie of the fleet( 23–25 April 1918 )" which was published in Eberhart von Mante's anthology of propaganda entitled "Undefeated at Sea: Thirty Monographs from the War at Sea" which was published by the nationalistic, antidemocratic, racist publisher J.F. Lehmann. For a number of his books, Busch used the pseudonym Peter Cornelissen . His book "Heut geht es an Bord...!" (Today we go on board) was published by the explicitly racist Arman publishing house in 1934. From 1933 onwards, Busch became the most widely read Nazi propaganda author on naval matters. The publishers of his works were all committed Nazis.

=== His involvement in the Destruction of the German PEN ===
At the General Assembly of the German PEN Club on 23 April 1933, Busch became a member, having been proposed in a list prepared by the Militant League for German Culture. By this time the German PEN had been forced into conformity with Nazi principles as its new secretary Johann von Leers commented. In May 1933, as a member of the German delegation, together with Edgar von Schmidt-Pauli and Hans Martin Elster, Busch persuaded the International PEN Congress not to pass a motion against the Nazi book burnings and the persecution of the Jews in Germany. He reported on this in an extensive letter, a copy of which was sent to Joseph Goebbels. When, despite the opposition of the German Delegation, the author Ernst Toller spoke out against the mistreatment and persecution of German authors in Nazi Germany, Busch and his delegation walked out of the Congress. Shortly after this, the German PEN Club withdrew from the international movement and in 1934 it was re-established as the Union of National Writers. Busch was secretary of this organisation . This successful destruction of the German PEN meant that all the authors living in German were forced to leave the international PEN Club. Only Germans living in exile were able to retain their membership.

=== As a Nazi Propagandist ===
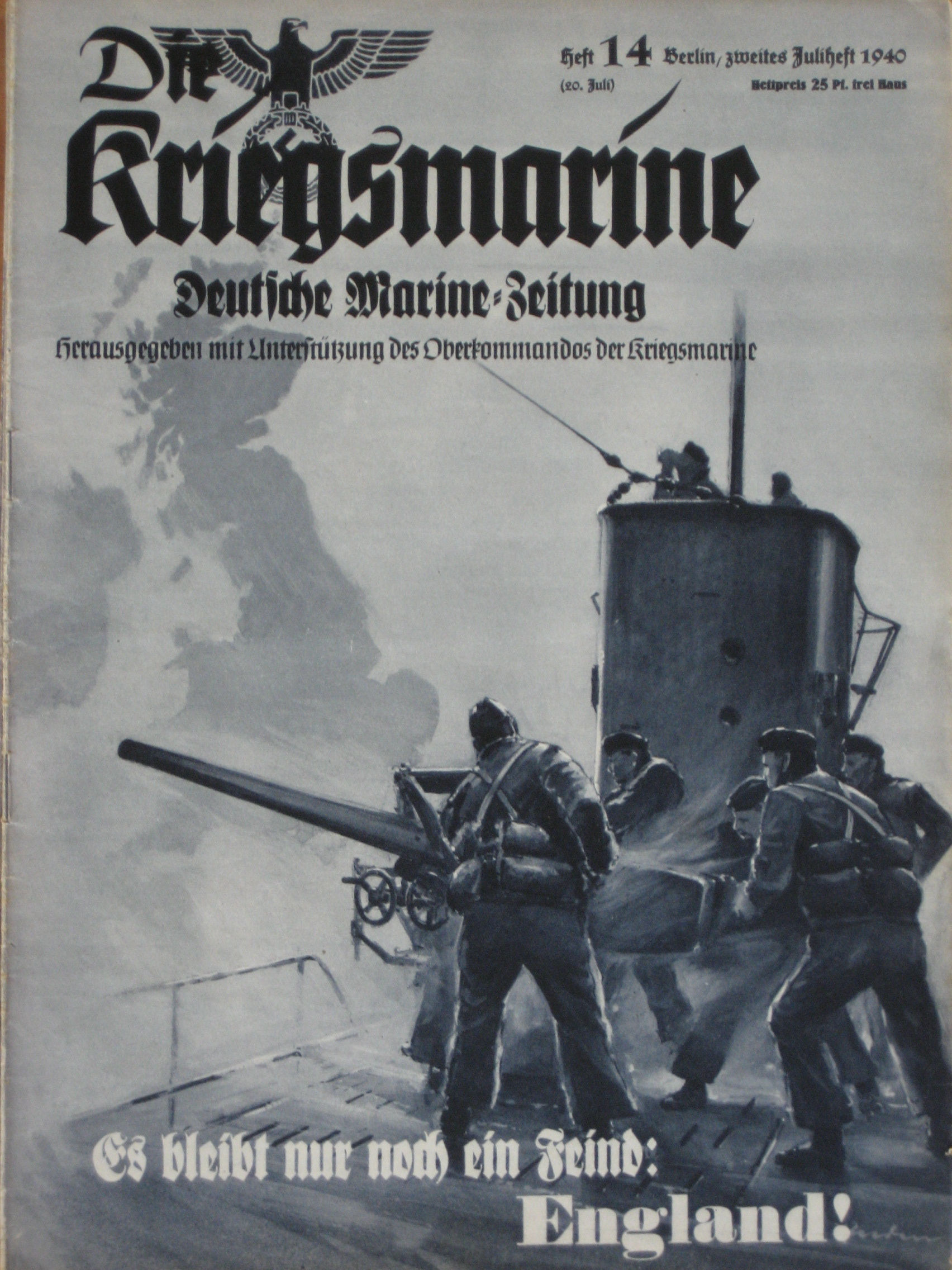
Magazine Die Kriegsmarine 14/1940 following the German defeat of France in June 1940

After the Nazis seized power, Busch was made the chief editor of the propaganda magazine "The Reichsmarine, Magazine for the Importance of the Sea and Seafaring" which was continued after 1934 as "The Kriegsmarine - Germany at Sea". When the Reichsmarine was renamed the Kriegsmarine on 1 June 1935, the magazine was renamed "Kriegsmarine - German Naval Magazine" Initially the magazine was published with the support of the High Command of the Navy, while it was later published directly by the High Command. Busch remained the chief editor till the Magazine ended in 1944. In other publications Busch also identified with Nazi propaganda positions. In conjunction with Dr Gerhardt Ramlow(1904-1951), author of propaganda and of literature intended for young people, Busch wrote a book called "A History of German Sea Warfare"(1940), which starts with the era of the early Germanic peoples. The book argues that the navy was an early centre of Nazi thinking: "It is not by chance that National Socialism, its attitudes and ideology found early support among the officers, NCOs and men of the Reichsmarine in numbers which were hardly to be expected by the opponents of the new thinking. While the armed forces had previously grown up to be totally apolitical and uneducated in political thinking, and considered it to be wrong if they should concern themselves with political matters, this changed during the Führer's relentless struggle for the soul of the Nation."

At the start of February 1933 a state funeral for Hans Maikowski, a member of the SA who died of a gunshot wound, took place in Berlin. In the broadcast of the occasion for propaganda purposes, the Nazis claimed that Maikowski was a second Horst Wessel. Among the other speakers, as well as Joseph Goebbels, was Fritz Otto Busch, who contributed a hymn of praise to the German forces.

=== "The Vikings", a book for young people (1934) ===
In her dissertation, Ingeborg Römer, the student of literature investigates the way in which numerous books for young people written during the Nazi period portray early nordic history. One of these is "The Vikings" written by Busch and published by the Franz Schneider publishing house in Leipzig. For Busch, Vikings are north-Germanic people, bold seafarers, and our blood relatives. The book consists of two main sections: factual descriptions of the construction of Viking ships, and the adventurously portrayed retelling of excerpts from the Vinland sagas. Römer indicates several typical examples of political exploitation and contrivance. Erik the Red and his sons are described as having exemplary attributes (Römer). It is conspicuous that in one single section Busch repeatedly uses the word "Führer" for Erik the Red, a word which is not normally used in maritime language, or if so only in the context of the word "Schiffsführer" (ship's master). In addition a dramatic battle with a storm by the crew of the Viking boat, which strengthens this motive has no precedence in the original. Many books for the young dealing with this topic, including the one by Busch, emphasise the discovery of America by the Vikings. In doing so, Busch combines a free description of genuine historical events with the present day. For example, he integrates the flights to America by "our fliers, Gronau and Balbo. These had found the same way to the new part of the world as the Vikings, which is illustrated on a map. Busch also builds further "bridges" (Römer) between the alleged forefathers and the present Nazi state. Thus according to Busch a "German" called "Tyriker" was a member of Erik's crew. However "German" as a nationality was still unheard of in the year 1000. Also the designation in the text "suðrmaðr" only literally means "South man" or "man from the South". It is similar when it comes to other details as well, thus the invocation of a god is modern and not historical. In the book, Erik confirms his intention to sail to the west with Leif calling out: "By Thor, and if I wanted to!". This acclamation is structured as would be expected from Christian belief, especially of a Catholic nature, and not as a pagan would do. Further details from the Vinland Saga are taken over by Busch uncritically, such as the alleged discovery of wine and grain there. Four booklets from the Thule Collection served as sources for Busch. The Vikings was reprinted several times. In 1938 copies 19-20,000 were printed, followed by 26-35,000 in 1941. Bush continued to publish on the topic after 1945. In 1966 Sponholz in Hannover published Viking Sails off America, the Saga of Gudrid and Freydis.

=== The best-seller: Narvik, the Heroic Fight of German Destroyers (1940) ===
In 1940, following the German victory in the Battle of Narvik the Bertelsmann publishing house released this lavishly turned-out book written by Busch. It was a work of "war reporting which toed the party line", it had an introduction by Grand Admiral Erich Raeder and was recommended by the OKW in the Books of the Armed Forces. The book was celebrated in the specialist press and after a year 200,000 copies had been sold. In 1941 Busch earned 242,084.47 RM from his writing activities, and in the following years he earned approximately 100,000 RM a year. In doing so, at that time he was among the highest-earning German authors. The Bertelsmann publishing house earned a clear total profit of 650,000 RM from the book. It reached place 17 in a list of Best sellers of the Third Reich which was published in 2010. According to Christian Adam, if you ignore the moral aspect, the Narvik book is generally well crafted, although at many places it was "quickly cobbled together". In a mixture of reporting, fictional elements and documents he describes a part of Operation Weserübung, that is the attack on Norway and the capture of the iron-ore port of Narvik. The war described in the book which is written from the perspective of a field commander is "clean". Death and suffering are blanked out. Alleged atrocities carried out on German survivors by the Royal Navy are emphasised. The book was a propagandistic success which achieved its desired effect in encouraging young men to go to war. "If he shows his characteristic arrogance, the Englishman has to be hit hard in the face. The sons of the island do not react to anything else".(Busch) As a result of a part of the text in the first chapter the book fell foul of several competing censors: the Reich Ministry of Public Enlightenment and Propaganda, the Führer's official representative for the supervision of the overall spiritual and ideological training and education of the Nazi party, Alfred Rosenberg, and the Navy. Despite meeting its desired effect as propaganda, Busch was criticised by the SS poet Kurt Eggers because he was not writing from his own experience. He argued that when the time came it was only from the circle of the "Narvik travellers" that the "prophets and singers" would be found who could write the conclusive heroic epic of this journey to the north. The book which Busch had written had only immediate value. The book also caused offence because of a description of a German church service which, however, Busch concluded in a contemporary way: "We have paid tribute to our fallen comrades who bravely and proudly went to death for our Führer, our race, and our Fatherland...Long live the Führer."(Busch) In autumn 1941 the book was withdrawn from the market, after the publisher had already sold 615,000 copies. As the book had been favourably budgeted, it provided Bertelsmann with its biggest net profit for a single book during the Third Reich. The publishing of this book was also very lucrative for the author. By to 1945 Busch had written about seventy further works, including the autobiographical novel Cruiser in the Red Tide which he wrote under the pseudonym Peter Cornelissen. In this novel he portrayed the final phase of the First World War and the Revolution of 1918 from the perspective of a young naval officer on board the minelaying light cruiser SMS Bremse. Busch wrote factual books, novels and books for the young, often containing propaganda for the navy. In addition he was also editor of the magazines Imperial German Navy, German Naval Newspaper and Raise the Anchor!. In addition he was also one of the authors who contributed to the series Wartime Library for German Youth.

=== After 1945 ===
In view of his involvement with National Socialism many of the books written by Busch landed in the list of literature to be withdrawn in the Soviet occupation zone or the GDR between 1939 and 1953. After a pause, in 1950 Busch started to write books about sea journeys and the navy. In this respect he also wrote books for the young which were published by Franz Schneider in Munich. He also translated works from English. Using his pseudonym Wilhelm Wolfslast numerous naval history books were published by Moewig in Munich, including two booklets for the war comic series: Soldiers' Stories from Round the World. In the 1950s, together with Otto Mielke he was an author for two story paper series SOS - Fate of German Ships and Anchor Stories: Seafaring around the World. The greater part of the publications of both series was republished from 1978 onwards by Pabel publishers under the title The Landser presents: Ship's fates on the Seas of the World. The German Maritime Search and Rescue Service also published - and frequently republished - a series of booklets Catastrophes at Sea, for which Busch also provided texts. In his work as an author, he worked together with the maritime illustrator Walter Zeeden, who illustrated numerous books, together with the two series by the Moewig publishers. Busch died on 5 July 1971 in Limpsfield in Surrey, where he is buried. From the 1950s he obviously lived for a long time in Viersen; Limpsfield is known to be his final home.
