= Limpsfield =

Village and parish in Surrey, England

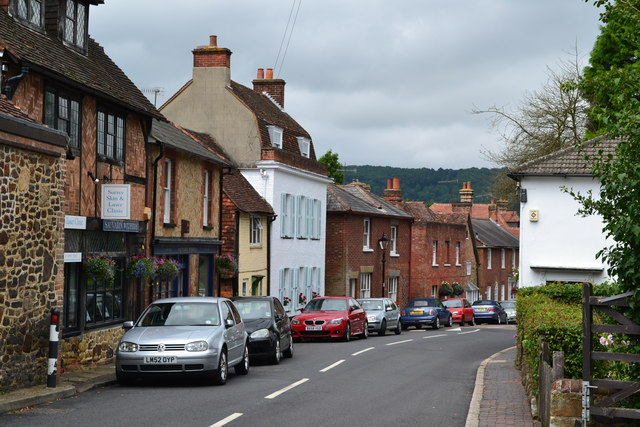
- High Street

- Location within Surrey
- Area: 18.54 km^{2} (7.16 sq mi)
- Population: 3,569 (Civil Parish 2011)
  - Density: 193/km^{2} (500/sq mi)
- OS grid reference: TQ406530
  - London: 18.0 mi (29.0 km)
- Civil parish: Limpsfield
- District: Tandridge
- Shire county: Surrey
- Region: South East
- Country: England
- Sovereign state: United Kingdom
- Post town: Oxted
- Postcode district: RH8
- Dialling code: 01883
- Police: Surrey
- Fire: Surrey
- Ambulance: South East Coast
- UK Parliament: East Surrey

Limpsfield is a village and civil parish in Surrey, England, at the foot of the North Downs close to Oxted railway station and the A25. The composer Frederick Delius, orchestral conductor Sir Thomas Beecham and clarinettist Jack Brymer are buried in the village churchyard. The village contains 89 listed buildings.

== History ==
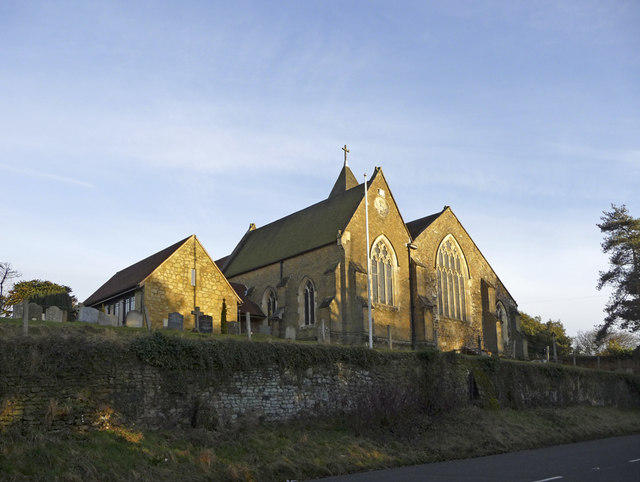
St Peter's Church at the north end of the High Street

The village lay within the Anglo-Saxon Tandridge hundred.

Limpsfield appears in the Domesday Book of 1086 as Limenesfeld. It was held by the Abbot of Battle Abbey, Sussex. Its Domesday assets were: 1 church, 1 mill worth 2s, 19 ploughs, 1 fishery, 4 acres (1.6 ha) of meadow, woodland worth 150 hogs, 2 stone quarries, and 3 nests of hawks. It rendered £24 (of silver) per year to its feudal overlords.

Old Court Cottage in Titsey Road, formerly the manorial court of the Abbot of Battle, is grade I listed building and dates from c. 1190-1200 (including aisle posts and arcade plates) with alterations in the late 14th century, and a 16th-century crosswing. Reginald Mason cited this in 1964 as an outstandingly important early example of a timber-framed building in the south of England.

The parish church of Saint Peter was constructed in the late 12th century and is a grade I listed building, extensively restored in the 19th century. The tower, with two-light plate-tracery windows of c.1260, is made of ironstone rubble with stone dressings and dressed stone to north aisle. In addition it has a wooden-shingled spire with a wooden cross surmounted. St Peter's church is also home to the last stained glass windows produced by John David Hayward, who lived for many years in nearby Edenbridge; the window depicts Saint Cecilia. Hayward was a leading artist in stained glass in the 20th century.

There are approximately twenty medieval buildings within the parish, and there are 89 listed buildings.

== Landmarks ==
The village heart is in a conservation area and some of the surrounding area is National Trust land including Limpsfield Common. Staffhurst Wood is also within the parish boundaries and is notable for its bluebells in spring. Limpsfield Chart has a golf course and cricket club. Limpsfield itself has a football team and a tennis club and its current cricket club is a united team with Oxted, named Oxted & Limpsfield Cricket Club with two grounds.

The village is served by Oxted railway station.

Limpsfield Grange School is a SEND school for girls and formerly an open air school.

The house known as the Manor House, High Street, is thought by Gillian Tindall to have been originally a cottage of the fifteenth or sixteenth century, much expanded and altered in the following centuries, and never in fact a manor house. It is a listed building. The building was a school, Manor House School, from 1897 to 1969. Notable former pupils include Tindall herself, Diana Rowden, agent in the Special Operations Executive, and Mary Soames, writer and daughter of Churchill. Tindall's book Three Houses, Many Lives (2012) is partly about the building.

== Geography ==
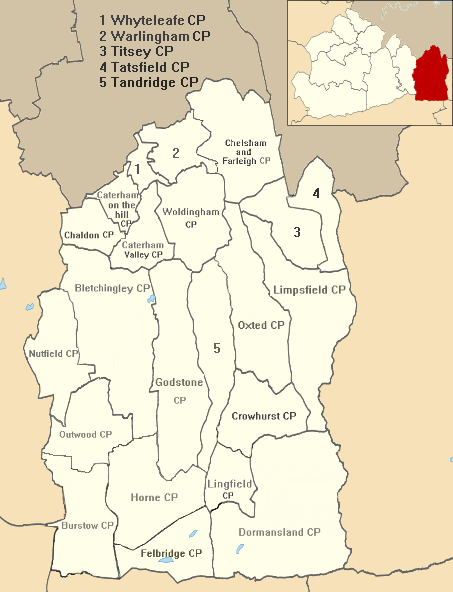
Map showing the position of Limpsfield Civil Parish in Tandridge

The civil and ecclesiastical parish area is grouped to the north and south of Hurst Green, Surrey. The built up section is north of Hurst Green and both east and north-east of Oxted. The lowest elevation is 62m at Staffhurst Wood on the south-western parish boundary on the River Eden, Kent and highest is just east of the town centre at Grubstreet Copse at 163m; (Titsey being a separate civil parish north of the village and higher on the North Downs).

The M25 motorway is to the north and Junction 6 for Godstone is just 3 1/2 miles west.

Nearby are three national rights of way: Vanguard Way, Pilgrims' Way and Greensand Way, the latter two along the hill ranges the North Downs and the Greensand Ridge.

== Localities ==
=== Limpsfield Chart ===
51.25°N 0.04°E Limpsfield Chart, arguably a village in its own right, begins from the south side of the A25. Chart is an Old English word for rough ground.

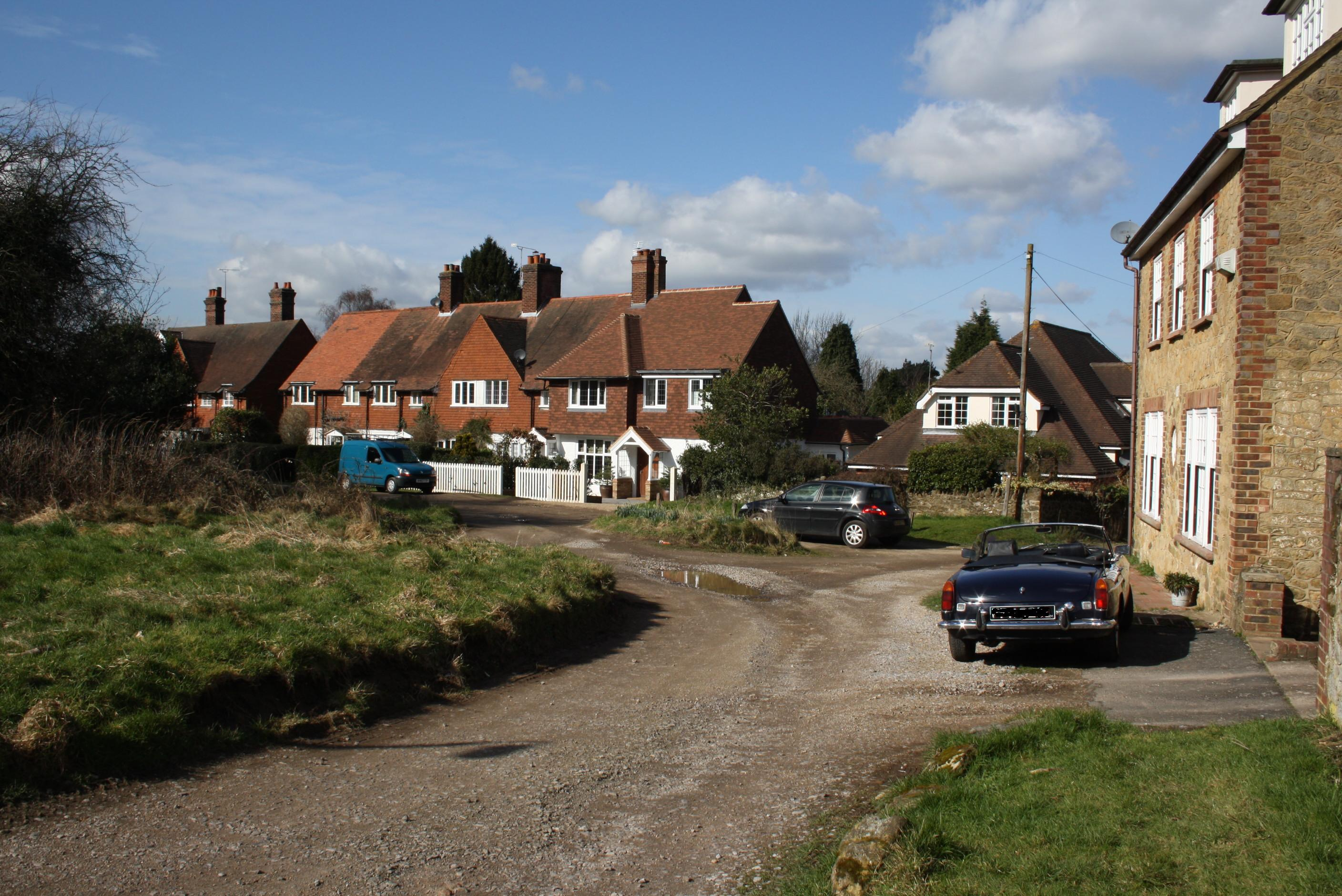
Limpsfield Chart

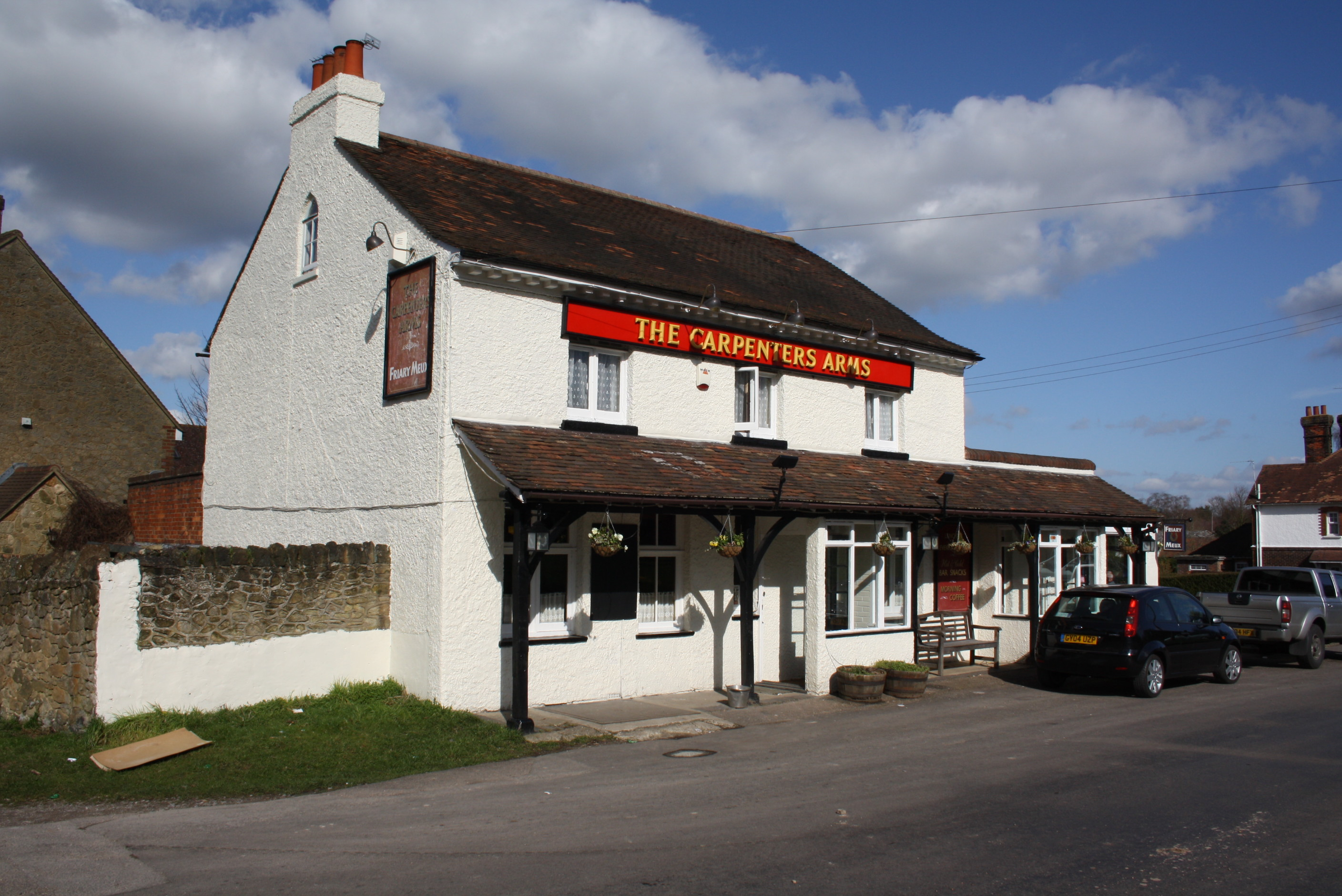
The Carpenters Arms

The adjacent High Chart, south-east of Limpsfield, is a large area of woodland, owned by the National Trust, which has a network of footpaths. The remains of a Roman road, the London to Lewes Way, pass through the woods east of the village, where it makes an eastward diversion from its alignment to avoid steep slopes. It passes through Crockham Hill before returning to its line near Marlpit Hill.

In the village is the C of E church of St Andrew, which it is the place of worship of 'a Conventional District' in the ecclesiastical parish of Limpsfield and Titsey, built in 1895. There is a pub The Carpenters Arms in the centre.

Within it is the halfway point in the Greensand Way long distance footpath which runs for 110 miles from Haslemere in Surrey to Hamstreet in Kent along the Greensand Ridge.

== Governance ==
Sam Gyimah was the Member of Parliament for East Surrey, which includes Limpsfield from 2010-2019. He joined the Liberal Democrats in 2019 having left the Conservatives. He stood down at the last General Election and was replaced by Conservative Claire Coutinho.

There is one representative on Surrey County Council representing Limpsfield as part of the Oxted division. Cameron McIntosh is the local Councillor and is a member of the Conservative group.

There are two representatives on Tandridge District Council for Limpsfield.

Election	Member	Ward
2022	Ian Booth	Limpsfield
2019	Claire Blackwell	Limpsfield

There is also a parish council with ten members.

== Demography and housing ==
2011 Census Homes
Output area	Detached	Semi-detached	Terraced	Flats and apartments	Caravans/temporary/mobile homes	shared between households
(Civil Parish)	841	254	147	187	1	0

The average level of accommodation in the region composed of detached houses was 28%, the average that was apartments was 22.6%.

2011 Census Key Statistics
Output area	Population	Households	% Owned outright	% Owned with a loan	hectares
(Civil Parish)	3,569	1,430	49.0%	34.2%	1,854

The proportion of households in the civil parish who owned their home outright compares to the regional average of 35.1%. The proportion who owned their home with a loan compares to the regional average of 32.5%. The remaining % is made up of rented dwellings (plus a negligible % of households living rent-free).

== Notable residents ==
=== Musicians ===
The composer Frederick Delius is buried in the churchyard of the parish church of St. Peter's, as is his wife Jelka. The English orchestra conductor, Sir Thomas Beecham, is buried only a few yards from Delius, whose music he supported and promoted. A nearby grave is occupied by the cellist Beatrice Harrison, who lived locally in Oxted, and who worked with both Delius and Beecham. The composer Michael Tippett (1905–1998) lived in Limpsfield for some years and taught in a local school. The ashes of Jack Brymer (1915–2003), a leading English clarinettist are interred in the churchyard near the grave of Beecham, who had recruited him to the RPO. The composer Pamela Harrison and her conductor husband Harvey Phillips lived at The Cearne from the late 1940s and into the 1950s.

=== Military ===
Rear Admiral Robert Gambier Middleton (1774–1837) who was active in the Napoleonic Wars and was Storekeeper-General of the Navy from 1829 to 1832 is buried in Limpsfield Churchyard. The German naval officer, maritime and naval writer, and committed Nazi Fritz-Otto Busch is buried in a corner of Limpsfield Churchyard. He took part in the Battle of Jutland on SMS Oldenburg. Admiral Sir William Rudolph Slayter KCB, DSO, DSC is buried in Limpsfield Churchyard. He was one of the nine survivors of HMS Queen Mary when her magazines exploded during the same battle with a loss of 1,266 lives. Commander Robert Radcliffe Cooke, R.N., Retired (7 March 1883 – 22 August 1924) who served in the Royal Navy is buried in the churchyard. Despite suffering from tuberculosis, he became an expert in wireless telegraphy. Leonard Montague Greenwood MC (bar), DSO(1893-1918) who is buried in Rouen is commemorated on his parents' gravestone in Limpsfield Churchyard. Margaret Mathilda Cather, mother of Geoffrey St. George Shillington Cather VC is buried in Limpsfield Churchyard. Glyn Ashfield DFC who fought in the Battle of Britain and died in 1942 when his Mosquito aircraft crashed on a low flying exercise is buried in Limpsfield Churchyard. Sergeant Pilot John Ferguson RAFVR who died in 1942 when his Wellington Bomber crashed while on a night cross-country training flight is buried in Limpsfield Churchyard. Brigadier Cecil Haigh, who was a Deputy Director of Ordnance Services in various roles during the Second World War is buried in Limpsfield Churchyard. Able Seaman Kenneth Alan Habgood who is commemorated in a plaque on a tree in the churchyard died on HMS Itchen (K227) aged 19.

=== Artists and writers ===
Arthur Rackham, the book illustrator, lived and died in Pains Hill (a small hamlet to the south of Limpsfield village) David Garnett, the novelist and Bloomsbury figure, spent his childhood in a house called The Cearne on the outskirts of the village. His mother Constance Garnett was a translator of Russian literature. The Scottish statesman and historian, Mountstuart Elphinstone, associated with the government of British India, is buried in Limpsfield churchyard. Florence L. Barclay, the romance novelist and short story writer, was the daughter of the local Anglican rector. Sir George Paish the economist, is buried in Limpsfield Churchyard. Cyril Jackson (educationist) is buried in Limpsfield Churchyard. Sir John Arthur Thomson FRSE LLD the Scottish naturalist who was an expert on soft corals is buried in Limpsfield Churchyard. The sculptor Frances Darlington spent the later part of her life at Dutton Cottage in Limpsfield. (Note: The location of Dutton Cottage is listed as Oxted in some sources, whereas it was actually in Limpsfield)

=== Others ===
John Elphinstone, 13th Lord Elphinstone is buried in Limpsfield Church.Maurice Hankey, 1st Baron Hankey of the Chart, is buried in Limpsfield Churchyard. Marmaduke Hilton, who is buried in Limpsfield Church, was "a West India merchant" and mortgagee of two slave-owning estates in Jamaica. Thomas Henry Biscoe, who is commemorated in the church, was the grandson of Vincent John Biscoe, who was Marmaduke Hilton's business partner. Colin Cowdrey, former England cricket captain, lived in the village for many years. Davina McCall, the television host, spent much of her childhood in Limpsfield. Jeremy Thorpe, politician, lived in Limpsfield for part of his childhood, and attended Hazelwood School. Beatrice Cutler pioneering matron and Secretary to the National Council of Nurses of the United Kingdom lived here for many years.

== See also ==
- List of places of worship in Tandridge (district)
