= Cornwall Gardens =

Garden square in South Kensington, London

Coordinates: 51.4966°N 0.1853°W

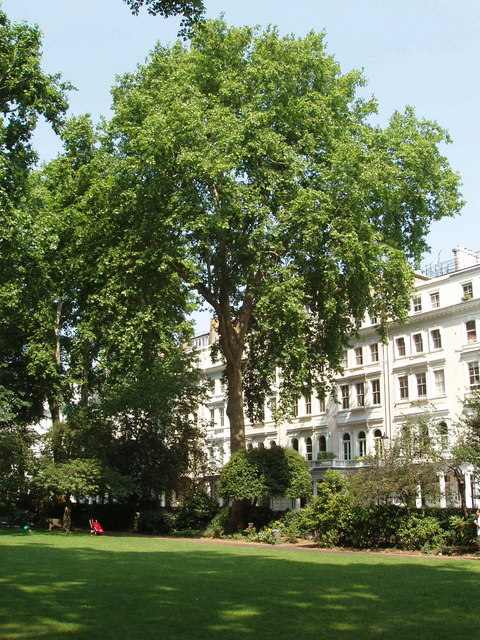
Cornwall Gardens

Cornwall Gardens is a long narrow garden square in South Kensington, London, England.

The street runs east–west off Gloucester Road and crosses Launceston Place.

The ownership of the holdings and land of what is now Cornwall gardens can be traced back to the sixteenth century, Anciently, the thin block of land stretching westwards from Gloucester Road to the Edwardes estate comprised two copyholds belonging to the manor of Earl's Court, amounting together to nearly eleven acres. The smaller portion next to Gloucester Road (formerly Hogmore or Hogmire Lane) was known as Church Close, the larger, more westerly portion as Long Mead, and the division between them was an old footpath, Love Lane, now represented by the line of Launceston Place and Grenville Place and its continuation through Cornwall Gardens. By 1680 they were in the same hands.

Purchased by John Broadwood in the early 1800s, it continued as a market garden until it came into possession of Thomas Broadwood Junior (1821-81) in 1844. Under the instruction of Broadwood, it was developed from 1862 to 1879 by (1862–76) Welchman and Gale from 1862 to 1876 and from 1876 to 1879 by William Willett.

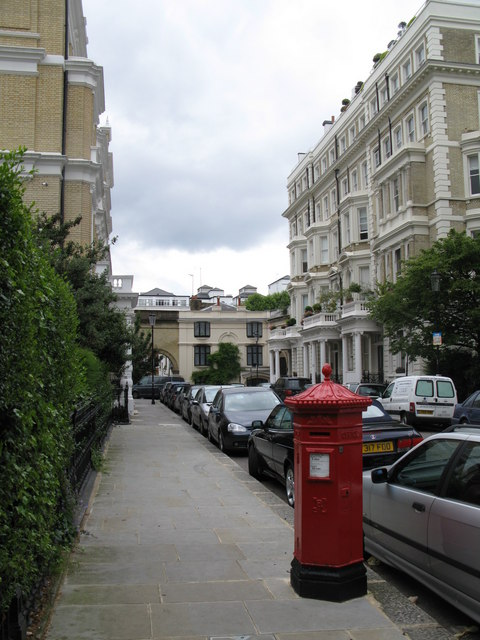
The Penfold pillar box on the north side of the gardens.

The buildings of Cornwall Gardens are listed Grade II on the National Heritage List for England in groups as 6–16, 17–44, 55–82, and 83–93. The pair of houses at the west end of the middle of the garden square, Cornwall House and Garden House, are jointly listed Grade II, as are the railings that surround the houses.

The 1860s Penfold pillar box on the north side of the gardens is listed Grade II.

Stanford Court, 45 is an elegant 1930s block home to several eminent residents.

Kynance Mews to the north of the square was originally built as stabling for the Cornwall Gardens development between 1862 and 1879.

== Notable residents ==
- Sir Hardy Amies, fashion designer (#29)
- Charles Bowen, Baron Bowen, judge (#1)
- Dame Ivy Compton-Burnett, novelist (5 Braemar Mansions, 1934 until her death in 1969)
- Sampson Lloyd, banker and politician (#3)
- Joaquim Nabuco, Brazilian ambassador and slavery abolitionist (#52)
- Sir Walter Joseph Sendall, British colonial governor (#91)
- Sir Terence Rattigan, playwright (born at #100)
- Dame Diana Rigg, actress
- Dame Iris Murdoch, novelist (#29)
- Dame Joan Sutherland, opera singer, and Richard Bonynge, conductor
- Sir James Fitzjames Stephen, judge and philosopher (#24)
- Sir Henry Maine, jurist, civil servant and historian (#27)
- Sir Polydore de Keyser, lawyer and Lord Mayor of London (Cornwall House)
- Robert Todd Lincoln, United States Minister to Great Britain (Cornwall House)
