= Epsom =

Town in Surrey, England

Coordinates: 51°19′59″N 00°16′07″W

- Town
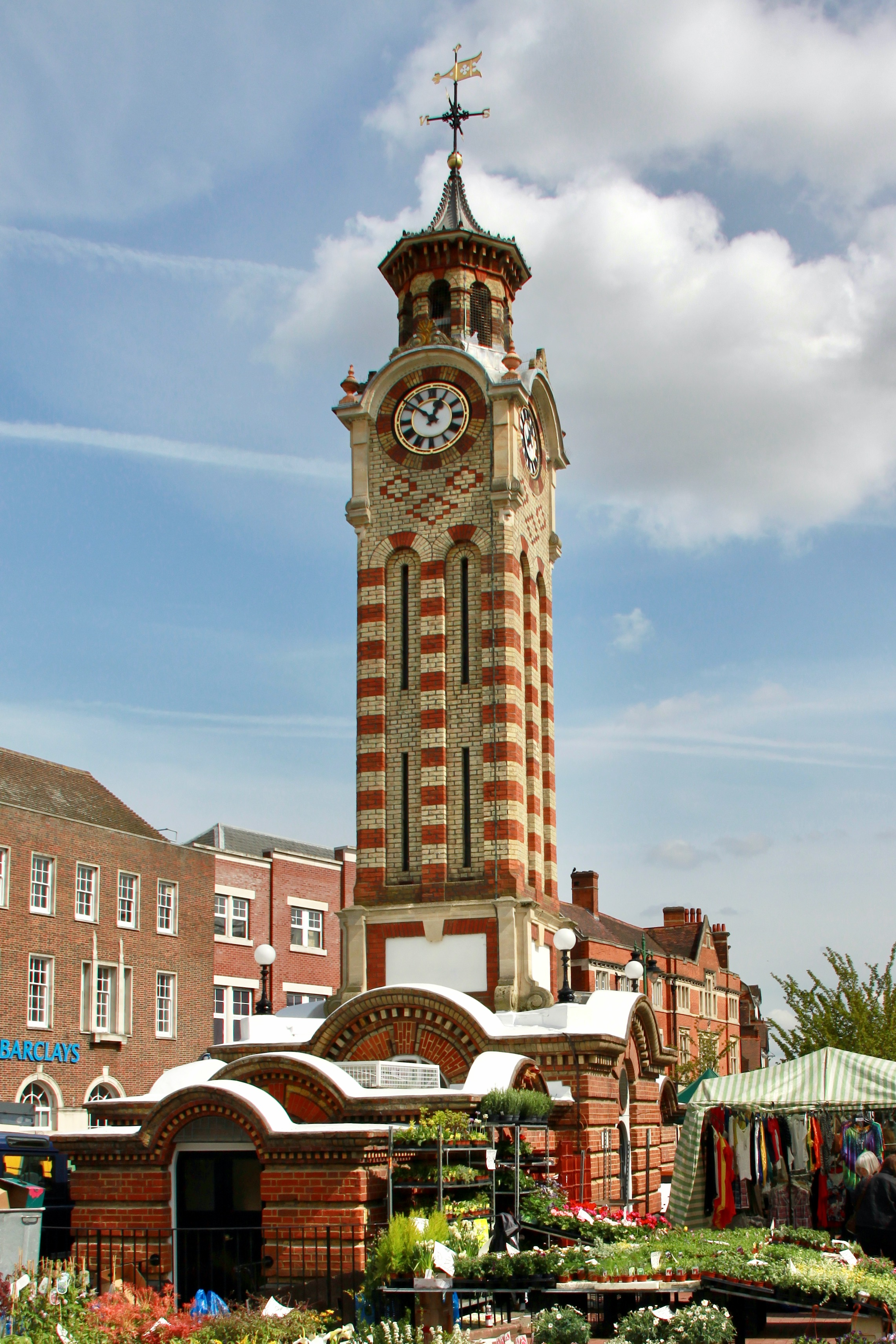
- Epsom Clock Tower, High Street

- Location within Surrey
- Area: 18.04 km^{2} (6.97 sq mi)
- Population: 31,489 (2011 census)
  - Density: 1,746/km^{2} (4,520/sq mi)
- OS grid reference: TQ2060
- District: Epsom and Ewell
- Shire county: Surrey
- Region: South East
- Country: England
- Sovereign state: United Kingdom
- Post town: Epsom
- Postcode district: KT17, KT18, KT19
- Dialling code: 01372
- Police: Surrey
- Fire: Surrey
- Ambulance: South East Coast
- UK Parliament: Epsom and Ewell

Epsom is a town in the borough of Epsom and Ewell in Surrey, England, about 14 miles (22 kilometres) south of central London. The town is first recorded as Ebesham in the 10th century and its name probably derives from that of a Saxon landowner. The earliest evidence of human activity is from the mid-Bronze Age, but the modern settlement probably grew up in the area surrounding St Martin's Church in the 6th or 7th centuries and the street pattern is thought to have become established in the Middle Ages. Today the High Street is dominated by the clock tower, which was erected in 1847–8.

Like other nearby settlements, Epsom is located on the spring line where the permeable chalk of the North Downs meets the impermeable London Clay. Several tributaries of the Hogsmill River rise in the town and in the 17th and early 18th centuries, the spring on Epsom Common was believed to have healing qualities. The mineral waters were found to be rich in Epsom salts, which were later identified as magnesium sulphate. Charles II was among those who regularly took the waters and several prominent writers, including John Aubrey, Samuel Pepys and Celia Fiennes recorded their visits. The popularity of the spa declined rapidly in the 1720s as a result of competition from other towns, including Bath and Tunbridge Wells.

Organised horse racing on Epsom Downs is believed to have taken place since the early 17th century. The popularity of Epsom grew as The Oaks and The Derby were established in 1779 and 1780 respectively. The first grandstand at the racecourse was constructed in 1829 and more than 127,000 people attended Derby Day in 1843. During the 1913 Derby the suffragette Emily Davison sustained fatal injuries after being hit by King George V's horse.

The opening of the first railway station in Epsom in 1847, coupled with the breakup of the Epsom Court estate, stimulated the development of the town. Today Epsom station is an important railway junction, where lines to London Victoria and London Waterloo diverge. Since 1946, the town has been surrounded on three sides by the Metropolitan Green Belt, which severely limits the potential for expansion. Two local nature reserves, Epsom Common and Horton Country Park, are to the west of the centre and Epsom Downs, to the south, is a Site of Nature Conservation Importance.

== Toponymy ==
The first written record of a settlement at Epsom dates from the 10th century, when its name is given as Ebesham. It appears in the Domesday Book of 1086 as Evesham and in subsequent surviving documents as Ebbesham and Ebesam (12th century), Epsam (15th century), Ebbisham and Epsham (16th century) and Epsome (17th century). The first known use of the modern spelling Epsom is from 1718.

The name "Epsom" is thought to derive from that of a Saxon landowner, either as Ebba's ham or Ebbi's ham (where ham means home or settlement). (Note: Although identity of the landowner is uncertain, it has been suggested that Ebba was a 7th-century South Saxon queen.) Alternatively the name may come from ebbe, the Old English word for "flow", which may reference an intermittent stream or spring in the area.

The first surviving record of land at Horton is from a charter of 1178, in which the modern spelling is used. It is also recorded as Hortune (1263) and Hortone (1325). The name is thought to derive from the Old English words horh and tun and is generally agreed to mean a "muddy farm".

== Geography ==
=== Location and topography ===
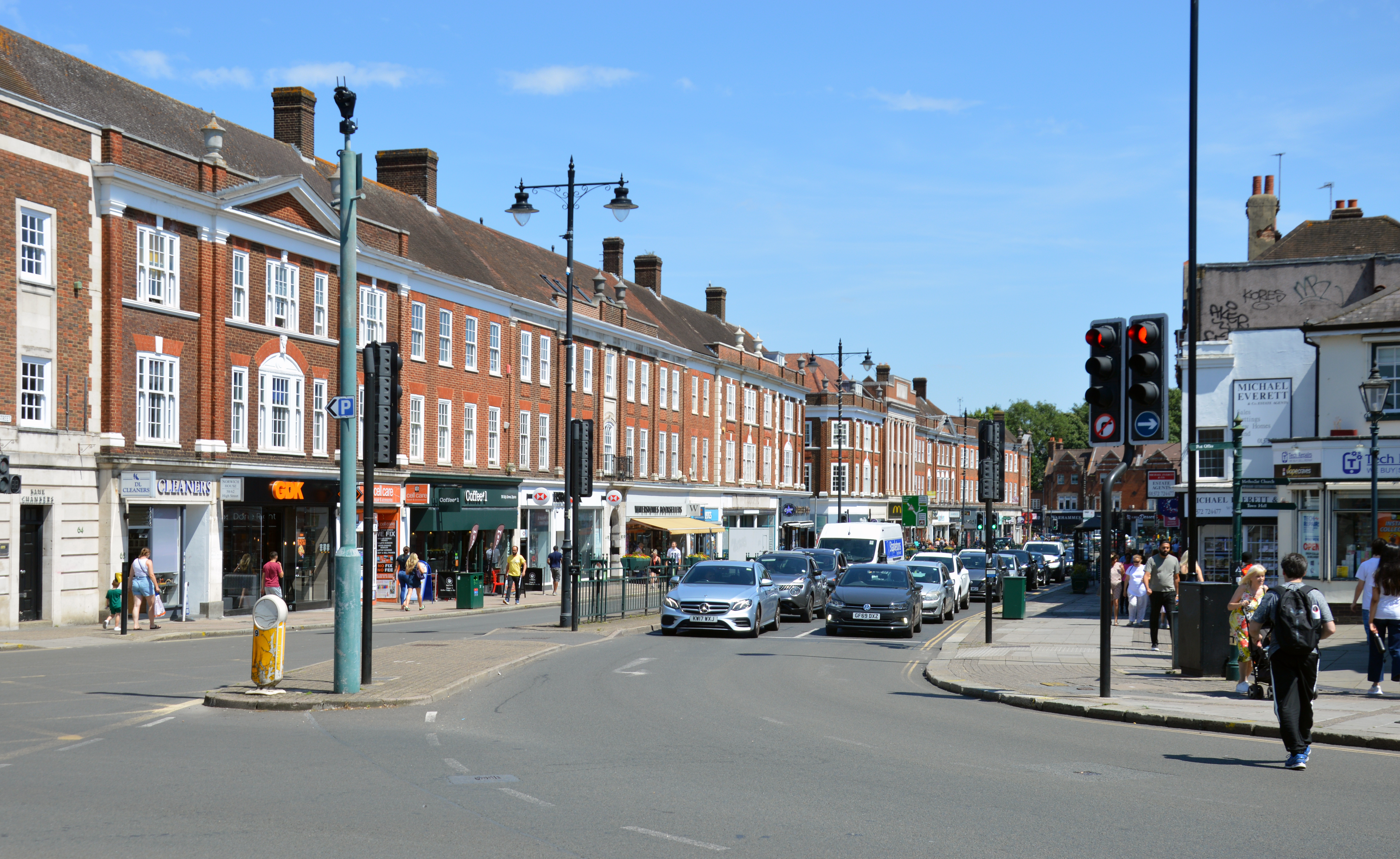
The town centre crossroads, where Ashley and Waterloo Roads meet the High Street

Epsom is a town in north Surrey, approximately 14 miles (22 km) south of central London. It lies on the southern edge of the London Basin and the highest point in the parish at Epsom Downs is 155 m (509 ft) above ordnance datum. The High Street defines the main west–east axis of the town and runs roughly parallel to the Leatherhead-Sutton railway line.

To the west of the town centre are two local nature reserves, Epsom Common and Horton Country Park, both of which are owned and managed by the borough council. Epsom Downs Racecourse is on Epsom Downs, an area of chalk downland to the south of the town.

Within the ancient parish boundaries are two settlements which were once part of Epsom. Horton, to the west of the centre, is the former location of five psychiatric hospitals, which were redeveloped to provide housing in the early 2000s. Langley Vale, a small village to the south of the racecourse, was predominantly developed in the first half of the 20th century.

=== Geology ===
Like many of the towns and villages between Croydon and Guildford, Epsom is a strip parish and spring line settlement. The areas to the south and east of the town lie on the chalk of the North Downs and the centre, north and west are on the London Clay. Separating the two, and running in parallel bands along a north–south axis, are narrow outcrops of Thanet Sands and the Lambeth Group. The chalk is a natural aquifer and tributaries of the Hogsmill River rise at several points along the boundary between the permeable and impermeable rock types. During the late 17th and early 18th century, the spring on Epsom Common was thought to have healing properties and the waters were later found to be rich in magnesium sulphate, which became known as "Epsom salts".

== History ==
=== Early history ===
The earliest evidence of human activity in Epsom is from the mid-Bronze Age. Remains of pits, ditches and post holes in Long Grove Road indicate that the area north of the town centre was used for agriculture in prehistoric times, which may suggest the presence of an established settlement nearby. Pottery sherds and worked flints, found on the site of the former Manor Hospital site in Horton, show that human activity continued into the early Iron Age and two staters (coins) from this period have been found in the area.

Although the route of Stane Street, the road between Londinium and Chichester, passes immediately to the east of St Martin's Church, there is not thought to have been a Roman settlement there. Archaeological evidence of Roman activity has been found to the north of the present town centre: A tile kiln, which may have been connected to the 1st- and 2nd-century brickworks on Ashtead Common, was discovered during the construction of the West Park Hospital in the 1920s. There may also have been a villa at Epsom Court.

The Anglo-Saxon settlement at Epsom was most likely established in the late 6th or early 7th century. It would have been administered as part of Copthorne Hundred and was probably located close to the site of the present St Martin's Church, which is built on a knoll of chalk at the base of the North Downs. (Note: The meeting place of Copthorne Hundred has been suggested to be marked by an earthwork and ancient hedge at the southern end of Woodcote Park, close to Langley Vale. The earthwork is denoted as the Nutshambles on a map of Ashtead dating from 1638.) Saxon burials have been excavated at two sites to the east of the modern town centre, close to the church. A garnet pendant, depicting a bearded male wearing a Phrygian cap, was discovered in the same area in the 1960s. The pendant is thought to have originated from the Mediterranean in the 7th century and its discovery suggests that high-status individuals were living in or travelling though Epsom in the Anglo-Saxon period.

The origins of the modern town centre are obscure, but the principal road pattern may have developed during the Middle Ages. In the 12th century, a nucleated village is thought to have been founded at the west end of the present High Street. The 1840 tithe map shows a series of narrow, regular plots along the north side of the High Street, which would be consistent with a planned, medieval settlement.

=== Governance ===
Epsom was held by Chertsey Abbey from Anglo-Saxon times until the first half of the 16th century. The earliest surviving charter confirming the ownership of the town is from 967, during the reign of King Edgar, although the settlement is thought to have been granted to the abbey in 727. (Note: There is some doubt as to the authenticity of the Anglo-Saxon charters of Chertsey Abbey, as many are only available as later medieval copies.) In Domesday Book, Epsom appears as Evesham and is listed as including two mills (valued at 10s), two churches, 24 acres (10 hectares) of meadow and sufficient woodland for 20 hogs. It rendered £17 per year in 1086. The residents included 34 villagers, 4 smallholders and 6 villeins.

The manor of Horton was also held by Chertsey Abbey during the medieval period. Although there are few surviving early documents relating to the settlement, an early 15th century charter indicates that it included 168 acres (68 hectares) of land, of which 60 acres (24 ha) was pasture. The Durdans estate may also have belonged to Horton. (Note: The manor of Horton was sold to the Trotter family in the 1780s and was later purchased by the Rev'd John Frederick Browning and his wife Ethelred. Their son, who had inherited the estate, died in 1842, and it was bought by Henry Willis. By 1896, a major part of the land had come into the ownership of Sir Thomas Fowell Buxton, who sold 1,000 acres (400 ha) to the London County Council for the construction of the group of psychiatric hospitals, known as the Epsom Cluster.) There are references in historical documents to a manor of Brettgrave, also held by the abbey, which appears to have been considered part of Horton by the early 16th century.

Following the dissolution of the monasteries, Henry VIII granted Epsom to Nicholas Carew in 1537, but two years later his property was forfeit when he was executed for his alleged involvement in the Exeter Conspiracy. The manor was part of the Honour of Hampton Court from 1597 until 1554, when it was granted to Francis Carew by Mary I. After 1611, Epsom was briefly held by the Darcy family and was then sold to Anne Mynne, the widow of George Mynne, who had bought the manor of Horton. Both manors were inherited by her daughter, Elizabeth, who in 1648 married Richard Evelyn, the brother of the diarist, John Evelyn. Richard Evelyn died in 1670, but Elizabeth ran the estate until her death in 1692, when the land was split up. For much of the 18th century, Epsom was held by the Parkhurst family and thereafter the lordship passed through a succession of owners before it was purchased by the borough council in 1955.

Reforms during the Tudor period reduced the importance of manorial courts and the day-to-day administration of towns became the responsibility of the vestry of the parish church. The Epsom Vestry appears to have operated as a select vestry, to which members of the gentry were appointed or co-opted. There was little change in local government structure over the subsequent three centuries, until the Poor Law Amendment Act 1834 transferred responsibility for poor relief to the Poor Law Commission, whose local powers were delegated to the newly formed poor law union in 1836. The Epsom Union was made responsible for workhouses in around a dozen parishes in the area, all of which were consolidated into a workhouse on the Dorking Road, now the site of Epsom Hospital. A Local Board of Health, with responsibility for sanitation, sewerage and drinking water supply, was formed in 1850.

The Local Government Act 1888 transferred many administrative responsibilities to the newly formed Surrey County Council and was followed by an 1894 Act that created the Epsom Urban District Council (UDC). The UDC area was expanded to include Ewell in 1933 and the enlarged authority was awarded borough status in 1937.

In 1951 the civil parish had a population of 30,860. On 1 April 1974 the parish was abolished.

=== Epsom spa ===
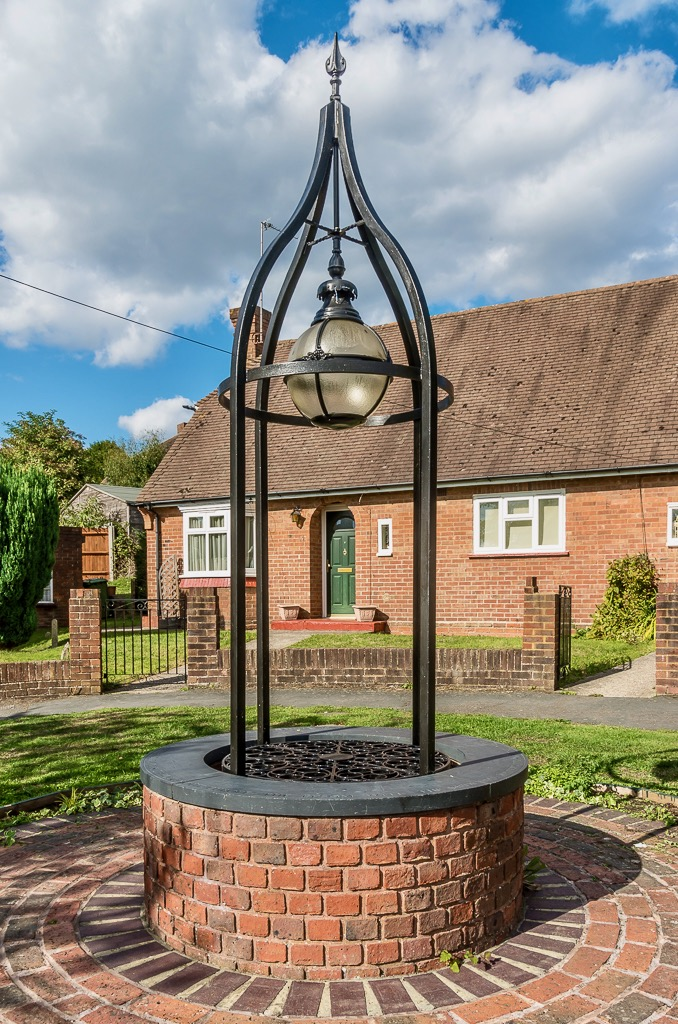
The wellhead marking the site of the original Epsom Well was constructed in 1989.

By tradition, the discovery of spa water is attributed to Henry Wicker, a farmer who, in 1618, noticed that his cows refused to drink from a slow spring on Epsom Common. However, the distinct chemical properties of the local water had already been recognised in the preceding decades: In 1603, local physicians had noted that the local water contained "bitter purging salt" and, in late-Elizabethan times, it was thought that bathing in a pond to the west of the town centre could cure ulcers and other disorders.

The first facilities for visitors were provided in 1621, when a wall was built around the spring and a shed erected for invalids. The first authentic account of the spa dates from 1629, when Abram Booth, of the Dutch East India Company, visited Epsom and described how "[p]eople coming there took a few glasses of the mentioned water – which has a taste different from ordinary water – after which walking up and down, these had in our opinion very good effect". During the mid-17th century, several prominent individuals travelled to the spring, including John Aubrey, who after his visit in 1654, boiled some of the water and noted that a "flakey" sediment, "the colour of bay-salt", was left behind. Samuel Pepys visited in both 1663 and 1667 (Note: Pepys records a first visit to Epsom on Sunday 26 July 1663 in his Diary: "Up and to the Wells, where great store of citizens, which was the greatest part of the company, though there were some others of better quality. I met many that I knew, and we drank each of us two pots and so walked away, it being very pleasant to see how everybody turns up his tail, here one and there another, in a bush, and the women in their quarters the like. Thence I walked with Creed to Mr. Minnes's house, which has now a very good way made to it, and thence to Durdans and walked round it and within the Court Yard and to the Bowling-green, where I have seen so much mirth in my time; but now no family in it (my Lord Barkeley, whose it is, being with his family at London), and so up and down by Minnes's wood, with great pleasure viewing my old walks, and where Mrs. Hely and I did use to walk and talk...") (Note: Pepys records a second visit to Epsom on Sunday 14 July 1667 in his Diary: "We got to Epsum by eight o'clock, to the well; where much company, and there we 'light, and I drank the water: they did not, but do go about and walk a little among the women, but I did drink four pints, and had some very good stools by it. Here I met with divers of our town, among others with several of the tradesmen of our office, but did talk but little with them, it growing hot in the sun, and so we took coach again and to the towne, to the King's Head, where our coachman carried us, and there had an ill room for us to go into, but the best in the house that was not taken up. Here we called for drink, and bespoke dinner; and hear that my Lord Buckhurst and Nelly are lodged at the next house, and Sir Charles Sidly with them and keep a merry house. Poor girl! I pity her; but more the loss of her at the King's house... By and by... we took coach and to take the ayre, there being a fine breeze abroad; and I went... to the well, and there filled some bottles of water to carry home with me; and there talked with the two women that farm the well, at 12l. per annum, of the lord of the manor, Mr. Evelyn... [So] the women and W. Hewer and I walked upon the Downes, where a flock of sheep was... So to our coach, and through Mr. Minnes's wood, and looked upon Mr. Evelyn's house; and so over the common, and through Epsum towne to our inne... [So] paid our reckoning, and took coach, it being about seven at night, and passed and saw the people walking with their wives and children to take the ayre, and we set out for home, the sun by and by going down, and we in the cool of the evening all the way with much pleasure home... Anon it grew dark, and as it grew dark we had the pleasure to see several glow-wormes, which was mighty pretty...") and the theologian, John Owen, took the waters in 1668.

Following the Restoration of the monarchy, Charles II was a regular visitor and it was at Epsom that he met the actress, Nell Gwyn, who became his mistress. Other royal patrons included Prince George, the prince consort of Queen Anne.

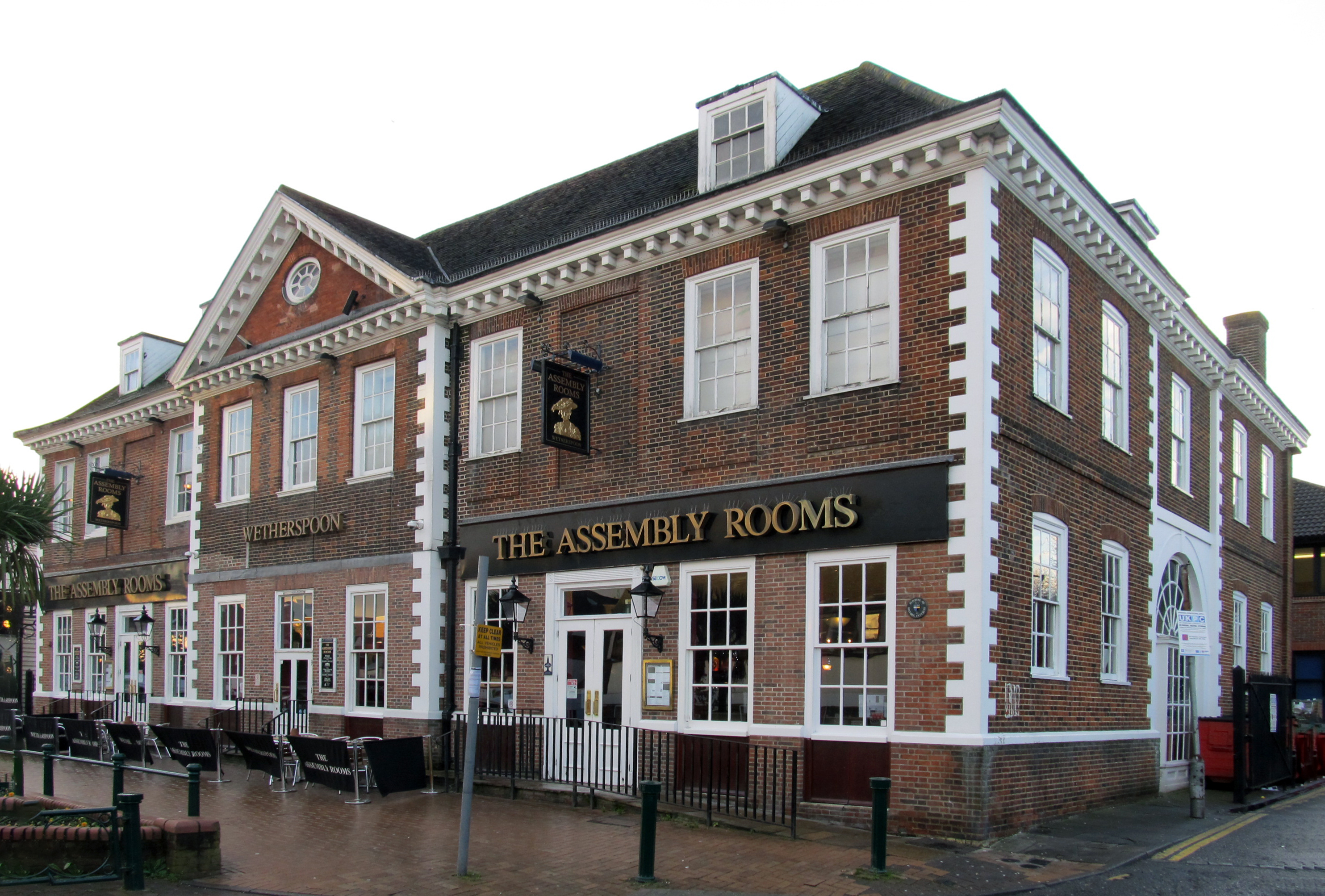
The Assembly Rooms, High Street

Despite the popularity of the spring on the Common, several early visitors were critical of their experience at Epsom. The writer, Dorothy Osborne, who visited in 1653, complained that the water had to stand overnight to allow the sediment to settle before drinking. Similarly, Celia Fiennes noted that Epsom was "not a quick spring", that it was often "drank drye" and to make up the deficiency, "the people do often carry water from the Common wells to fill this in a morning; this they have found out in which makes the water weake and of little operation - unless you can have it first from the well before they can have put in any other".

The popularity of Epsom continued to increase in the final decades of the 17th century and a regular coach service from London was established in 1684. In the 1690s, John Parkhurst, Lord of the Manor of Epsom, began to develop the town into a spa resort. The Assembly Rooms in the High Street were constructed in 1692 and a new well was sunk to the west of South Street. By 1707, a local businessman and apothecary, John Livingstone, had opened a bowling green, gaming rooms and a ballroom.

In the mid-1720s, the popularity of Epsom experienced a rapid decline, driven partly by the economic consequences of the bursting of the South Sea Bubble. There was also competition from other spa towns, including Bath and Tunbridge Wells, and, by the 1750s, synthetic Epsom salts were being manufactured commercially. (Note: The English scientist, Nehemiah Grew, published a method for making synthetic Epsom salts in 1695.) Attempts were made in the 1760s to revive the spa, but these efforts were unsuccessful.

=== Horse racing ===
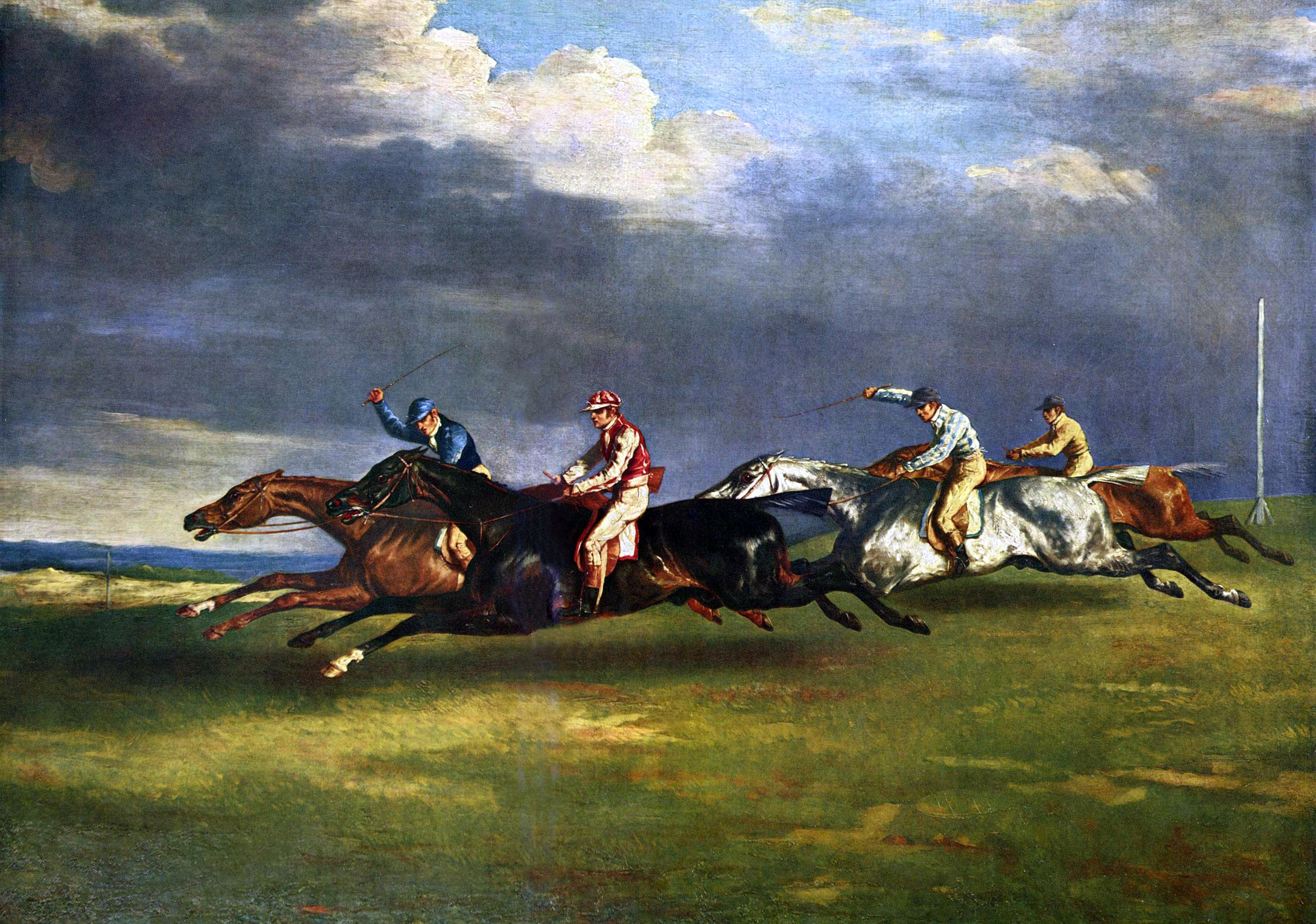
The 1821 Derby at Epsom (1821) by Théodore Géricault

The earliest horse races on Epsom Downs are thought to have been held in the early 17th century, during the reign of James I. By the time of the Civil War, the sport was sufficiently popular and well known that, in May 1648, royalist forces were able to assemble on the Downs under the pretence of organising a race, before marching together to Reigate. Following the Restoration of the monarchy, there was a further increase in the popularity of racing as Epsom became established as a spa town.

The Irish philosopher, John Toland, noted the suitability of the Downs for sport, writing in 1711 that the land was "covered with grass finer than Persian carpets… for sheep-walks, riding, hunting, racing, shooting, with games of most sorts for exercise of the body or recreation of the mind… they are no where else to be paralleled". The earliest formal races were run on an uphill course from Carshalton to Epsom and were primarily a test of stamina rather than speed. By the mid-18th century a four-mile (six-kilometre) straight course had been established, starting at Banstead and finishing at the top of the Downs at Epsom. Heats were run in the mornings, before a break for lunch, which was followed by the final run offs in the late afternoon.

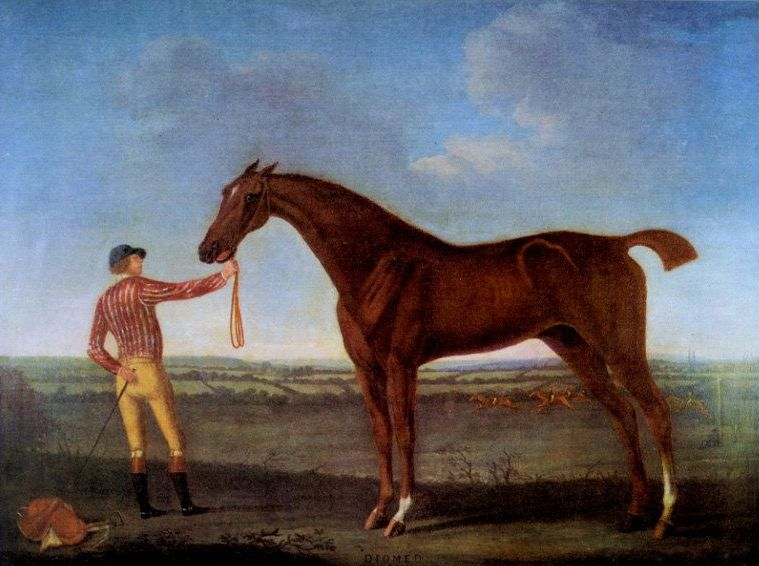
Diomed by John Nost Sartorius (1755–1828). Diomed was the winner of the first Derby in 1780.

The Oaks was established in 1779 and was named after the residence of the 12th Earl of Derby at Banstead. The race, for three-year-old fillies, was shorter than those that had taken place in previous years and was run over a 1 1/2-mile (2.4 km) course. The Derby was first run the following year, as a shorter race of 1 mi (1.6 km) for three-year-old colts, but was increased to 1 1/2 mi (2.4 km) in 1784. As early as 1793, the crowds associated with Derby Day were causing congestion on local roads and, in 1843, more than 127,000 people attended the race. Formal royal patronage began in 1840 with the visit of Queen Victoria and horses owned by her son, Edward VII, won the event in 1896, 1900 and 1909. The world's first live outside broadcast was filmed at the 1931 Derby by the Baird Television Company.

During the 1913 Derby, the suffragette, Emily Davison, sustained fatal injuries after being hit by King George V's horse, Anmer. The incident occurred at Tattenham Corner, the final curve before the finishing straight, after she ducked under the guard rail and ran onto the course. Davison was knocked unconscious and was taken to Epsom Cottage Hospital, where she died four days later on 8 June 1913. The inquest into her death took place at Epsom on 10 June. A road close to Tattenham Corner is named "Emily Davison Drive" in her honour and a statue of the suffragette was installed in Epsom High Street in June 2021.

The first permanent building on Epsom Downs is thought to have been a rubbing house, where horses could be brushed down and washed after racing. Parts of the Rubbing House pub, which now occupies the site, date from 1801. Until the early 19th century, facilities for race attendees were limited to temporary wood and canvas structures and construction of the first grandstand did not begin until 1829. The Queen's Stand, which incorporates a conference centre, was completed in 1992 and the current grandstand was opened in 2009.

=== Transport and communications ===
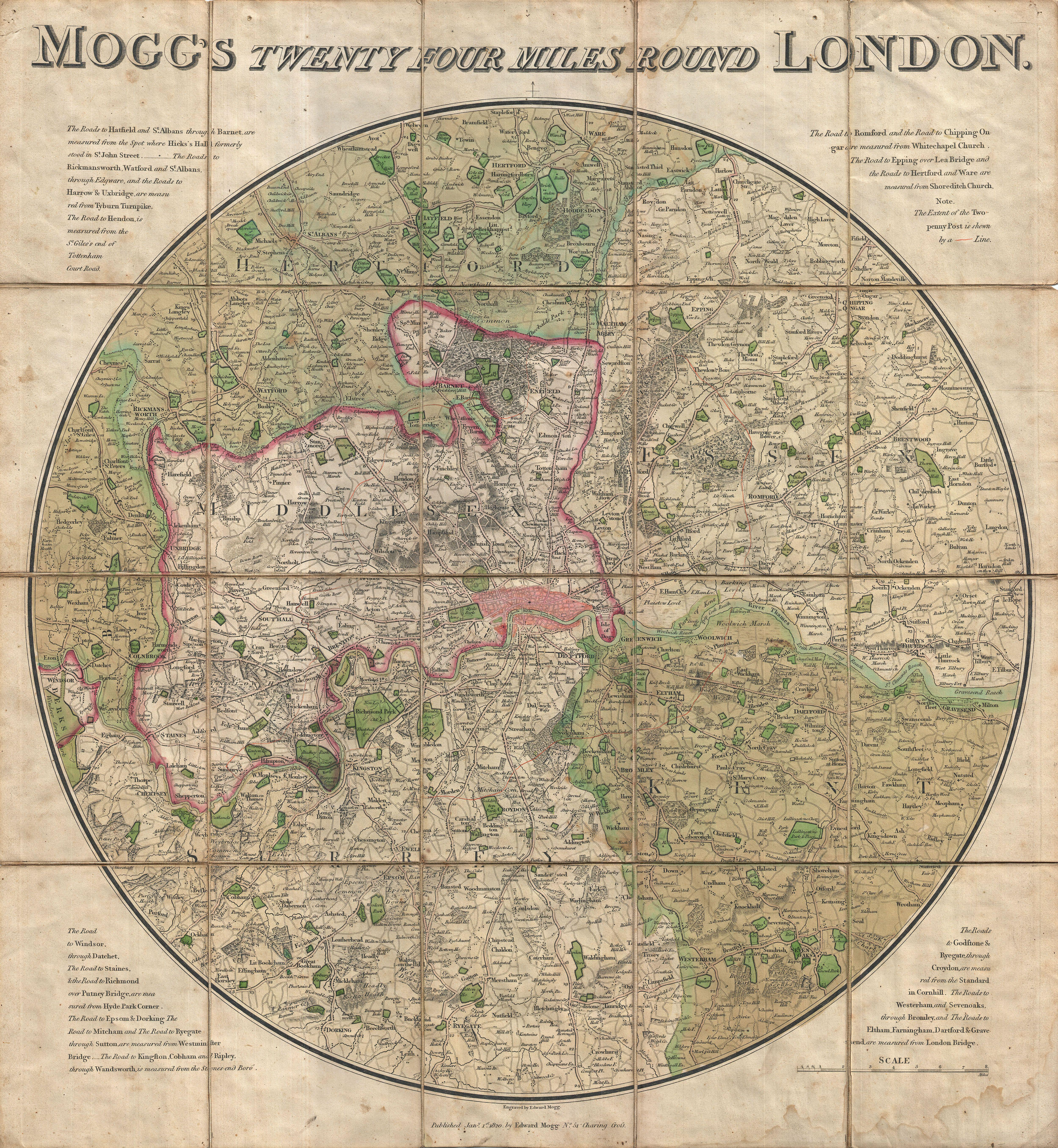
Extract from Mogg's Twenty Four Miles Round London, 1820 showing the turnpike road through Epsom

Following the end of Roman rule in Britain, there appears to have been no systematic planning of transport infrastructure in the local area for over a millennium. The section of Stane Street to the west of the modern town centre remained in use through the Anglo-Saxon period and is referred to as the Portway in the reign of Henry VII. The section of the Roman road to the south of Epsom is thought to have been blocked by the enclosure of Woodcote Park in the mid-12th century. Visitors to the spa were able to reach Epsom by carriage during the 17th century, although the turnpikes to London and Horsham were not constructed until 1755.

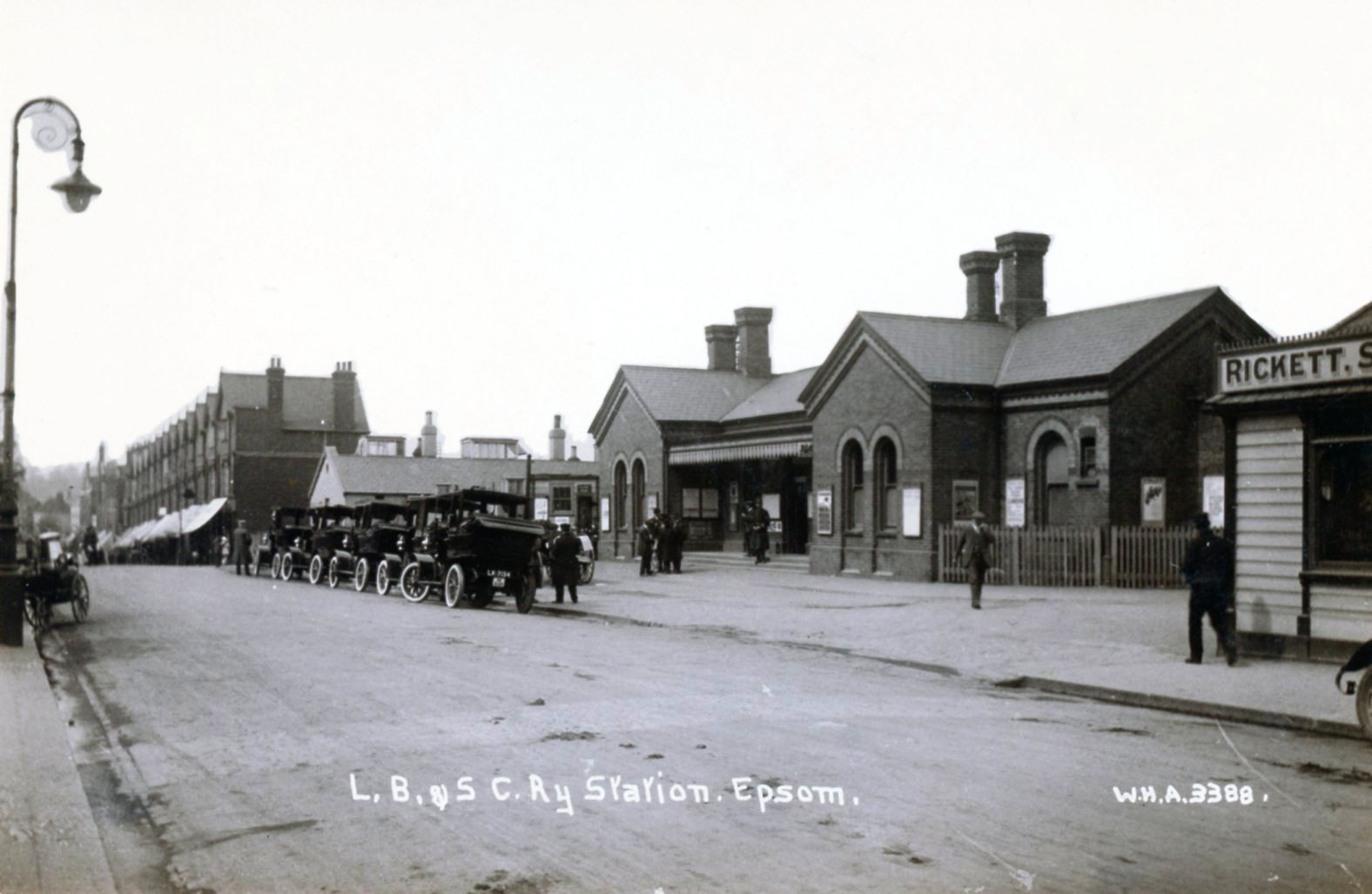
Epsom Town station building (LBSCR), photographed c. 1900

The first railway line to reach Epsom was the London, Brighton and South Coast Railway (LBSCR), which opened a railway station in the Upper High Street in 1847. Services initially ran to Croydon, where there was a junction with the Brighton Main Line. The line between Epsom and Leatherhead was opened by the independent Epsom and Leatherhead Railway Company on 1 February 1859. It was initially constructed as a single-track line and services were run by the London and South Western Railway (LSWR). The LSWR's own line via Worcester Park towards Wimbledon was completed two months later, allowing trains from Epsom to reach London Waterloo. The LBSCR extended its line westwards to meet that of the LSWR in August of the same year, allowing it to run services to Leatherhead. Two branch lines serving the race course opened to Epsom Downs and Tattenham Corner in 1865 and 1901 respectively.

Although both the LSWR and LBSCR ran services along the line to Leatherhead, the two companies maintained separate stations in Epsom for 70 years. Following the formation of the Southern Railway in 1923, a decision was taken to combine the two on a single site. The LBSCR station was closed in 1929 and the LSWR station was reconstructed to increase the number of platforms to four, so that all trains passing through the town could serve it. (Note: A similar process occurred at Leatherhead, where, in 1927, the LSWR station closed and the track layout was altered so that all trains could use the LSBCR-built station.) The changes coincided with the electrification of the lines to London Waterloo and London Victoria in 1925 and 1929 respectively. These improvements resulted in a dramatic increase in the number of season tickets sold and stimulated the growth of the town from a population of 18,804 in 1921 to 27,089 in 1931.

A regular postal service between Epsom and London was established in 1678. Initially the service ran three times per week, but ran daily from 1683. The current Post Office in the High Street opened in 1897 and a sorting office in East Street opened in 1956. The first automatic telephone exchange in the UK was opened in the town in May 1912, replacing a manual exchange dating from 1905. The system used switching equipment designed by the American inventor, Almon Brown Strowger, and had provision for a maximum of 500 lines.

=== Residential development ===
Epsom is unusual among Surrey towns, in that it underwent considerable expansion during the early modern period. As the spa developed in the 1670s, merchants from London started to construct their own mansions on the outskirts of the town. These baroque buildings were generally made from bricks produced at the brickfield on the Common. The demand for labourers brought incomers with new skills, who began to boost the local economy. The construction of a small row of shops at the junction of the High Street and South Street led to the establishment of a market in 1680 and, in 1692, two London goldsmiths developed the site further by building their own houses.

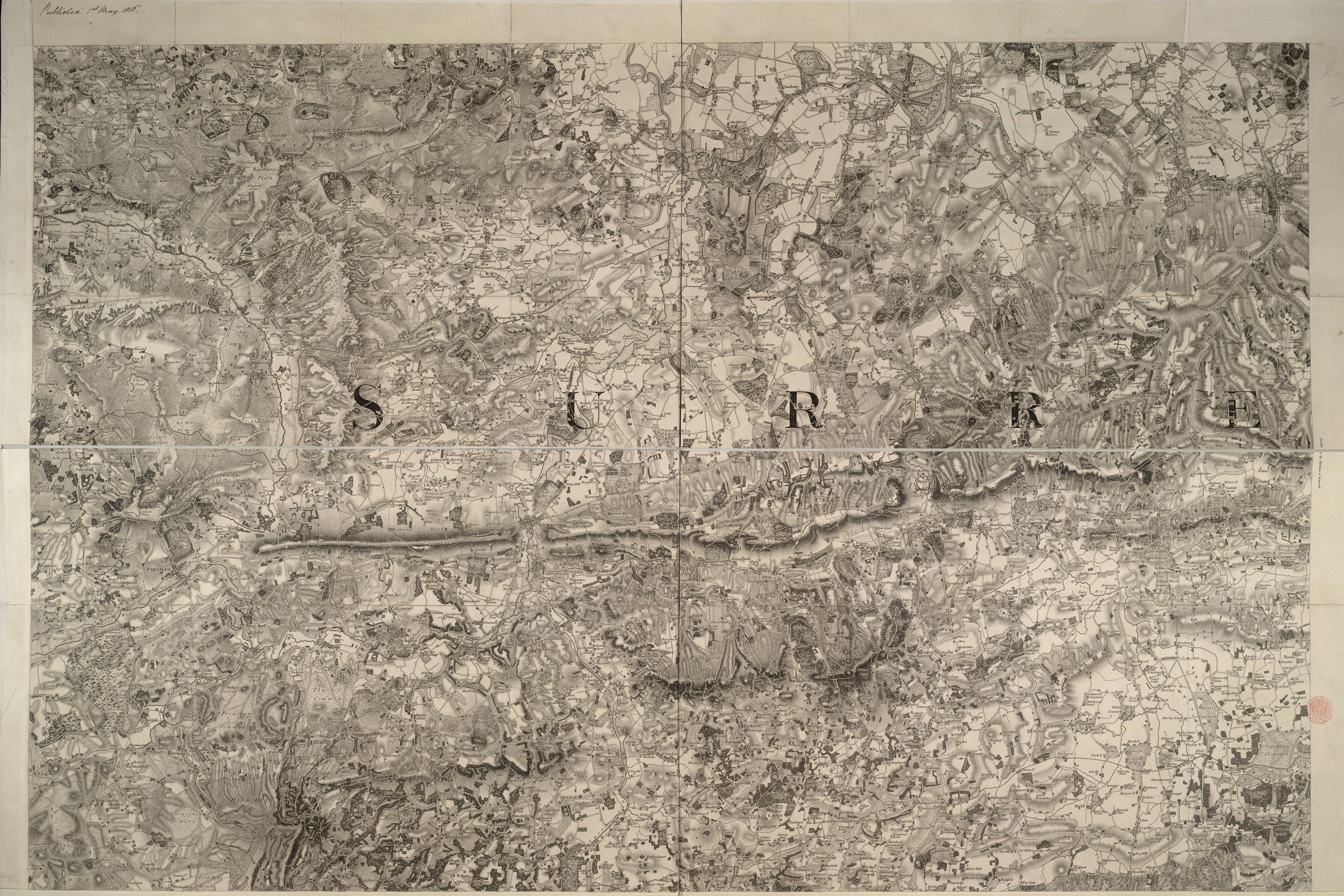
Epsom in 1816

By 1800, Epsom had over 400 houses and this number increased to 600 by the middle of the century. In the 1860s, plans were put forward to improve the drainage on the Common and to build houses on it, but were dropped due to local objections. Following the enclosure of the common fields to the south of the town centre in 1869, housebuilding commenced along Burgh Heath, College and Worple Roads. At around the same time, houses for the working classes were constructed in the area between the two railway lines to Sutton and Wimbledon.

In the final decade of the 19th century, Epsom Court, to the north of the town centre, was divided and sold for development and, over the next twenty years, terraced houses were built on the land. Shops on Waterloo Road and houses in Chase Road were built from 1928 and the Copse Edge Avenue estate was begun in the same year. The award of borough status to the council in 1937, allowed it to take over running of 1500 council houses that had been built between 1920 and 1939.

The 1944 Greater London Plan designated land on three sides of the town centre as part of the protected Metropolitan Green Belt, which severely limited the scope for urban expansion to the east, west and south. Since limited development of Langley Vale and the Epsom Wells estate had taken place in the early 1930s, these areas were not placed into the Green Belt and housebuilding continued into the 1950s. In the early 2000s, the Epsom Cluster of psychiatric hospitals in Horton was redeveloped to provide around 1850 new homes.

=== Commerce and industry ===
From much of its early history, Epsom was primarily an agricultural settlement. The two common fields attached to the medieval manor, Woodcote (350 acres (140 ha)) and Smith Hatch (500 acres (200 ha)), were divided into strips, which were assigned to residents of the town. In the 15th century, sheep farming became increasingly important and a wool fair was held in June each year until the 1870s. There was also an annual pleasure fair which took place in July. The right to hold a market at Epsom was granted to Elizabeth Evelyn by Charles II and the charter was renewed by James II in 1685. Enclosure of the common fields was completed in 1869, bringing to an end the open-field system in the town. (Note: Epsom was one of the last settlements in the country to have its common fields enclosed. In comparison, the common fields of Ewell and Ashtead were enclosed in 1802 and 1838 respectively.)

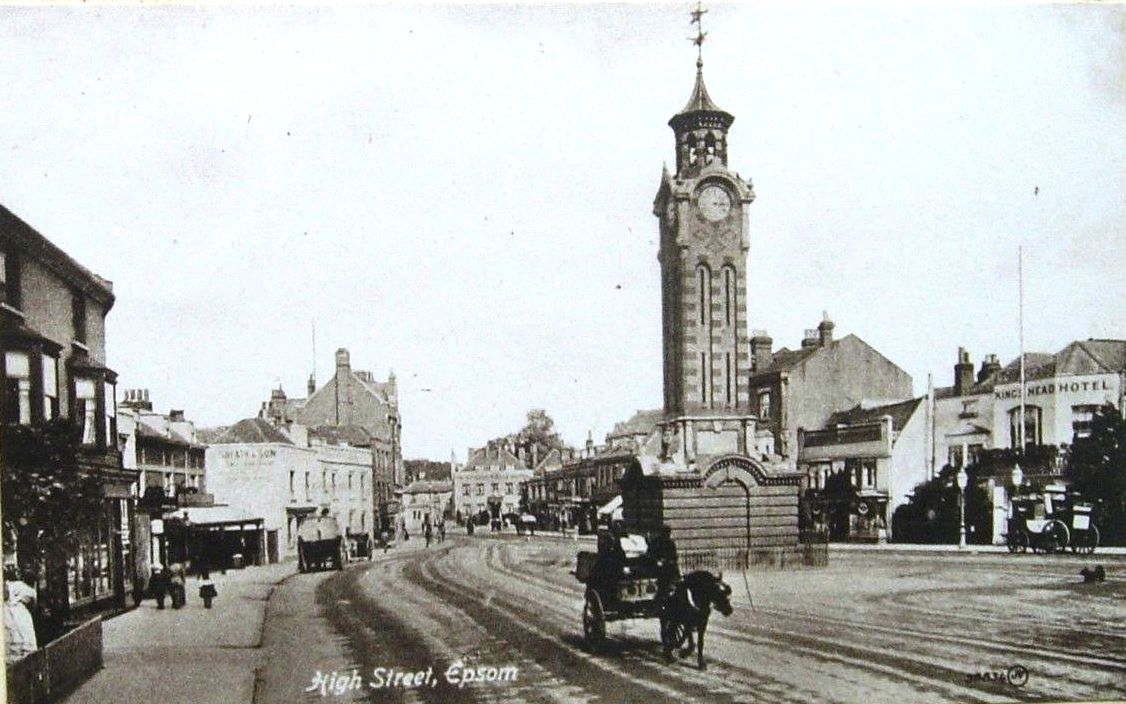
The High Street in the early 1900s

Brick and tile manufacturing took place on Epsom Common until the end of the 18th century and between 1830 and 1938 at a site on Kiln Lane. In the 19th century, chalk was quarried and converted to lime at a site in College Road. Mineral water and fruit juices were bottled in the town by the Randalls company from 1884, which traded from premises in South Street until the 1980s. In the 19th century, there were two breweries in Epsom - WG Bradley and Son in South Street and Pagden's in Church Street. Dorling's Printworks was established in the town in the 1820s and for many years printed racecards and brochures for the Derby, before its closure in 1979. Today, one of the largest private employers in the town is the engineering consultancy firm Atkins, which moved to Epsom in 1962.

=== Epsom in the world wars ===
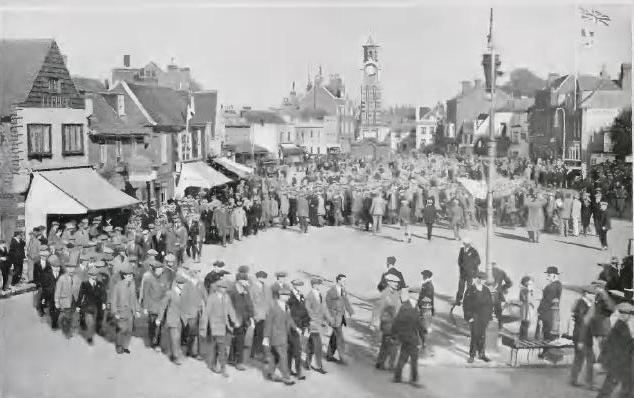
New recruits in Epsom High Street, 19 September 1914

In September 1914, Epsom became a garrison town. Two battalions of the University and Public Schools Brigade of the Royal Fusiliers were billeted in the town and underwent training in Rosebery Park and on Epsom Downs. Some of the racecourse buildings were converted to become a war hospital and, in January 1915, 20,000 soldiers were assembled on the Downs for an inspection by Lord Kitchener.

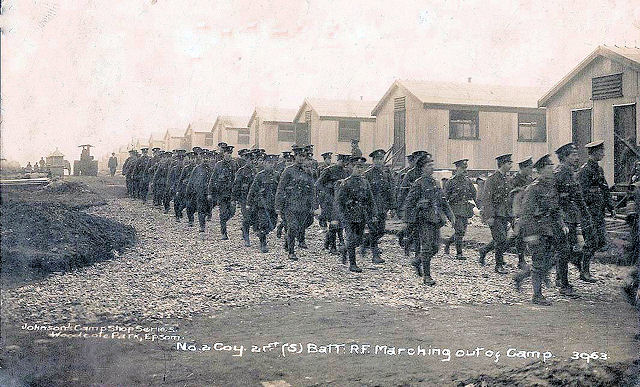
Soldiers from the Royal Fusiliers at Woodcote Park in 1915

Woodcote Park Camp was built to house the soldiers of the Royal Fusiliers in late 1914 and early 1915. The 350-acre (140 ha) site was considered suitable as it was close to London. The first soldiers took up residence in February 1915, but the camp was vacated by the Brigade when it was dispatched to the Western Front three months later. Between May 1915 and August 1916 the camp became a convalescent hospital for Commonwealth soldiers. It was handed over to Canadian Forces in July 1916 and remained under their control until the end of the war. Following the end of the First World War, the Canadian soldiers were slow to be repatriated. On 17 June 1919, a group of 400 attacked Epsom Police station, injuring Station Sergeant Thomas Green, who died the following day. At a trial in July 1919, five men were found guilty of riotous assembly and were imprisoned until November of the same year.

By the outbreak of the Second World War in September 1939, public air raid shelters had been constructed at Rosebery Park and Clay Hill Green. Later in the war, large shelters were provided at Ashley Road, to the south of the town centre, and at Epsom Downs. (Note: Although construction of the Ashley Road shelter is officially recorded as starting in 1941, it has been suggested that parts were built as early as 1937 and that it was originally intended for use as a necropolis.) Over the course of the war around 440 high-explosive bombs were dropped on the borough, 33 people were killed and nearly 200 houses were destroyed. Towards the end of the conflict, 30 V-1 flying bombs landed in the area, including one, in July 1944, which destroyed the Ashley Road Police Station.

During the Second World War, the defence of the town was largely in the hands of the 56th Surrey battalion of the Home Guard, who were trained by a company of Welsh Guards at Epsom Racecourse. Throughout the borough there were 55 Air Raid Precautions (ARP) posts, staffed by up to 140 paid air raid wardens and 560 volunteers. In mid-1940, the Outer London Defence Line A was constructed through Epsom, running along Christchurch Road, the High Street and Alexandra Road.

== National and local government ==
=== UK parliament ===
The town is in the parliamentary constituency of Epsom and Ewell and has been represented at Westminster since July 2024 by Liberal Democrat Helen Maguire.

=== County council ===
Councillors are elected to Surrey County Council every four years. The town is divided between two wards: "Epsom Town & Downs" and "Epsom West".

=== Borough council ===
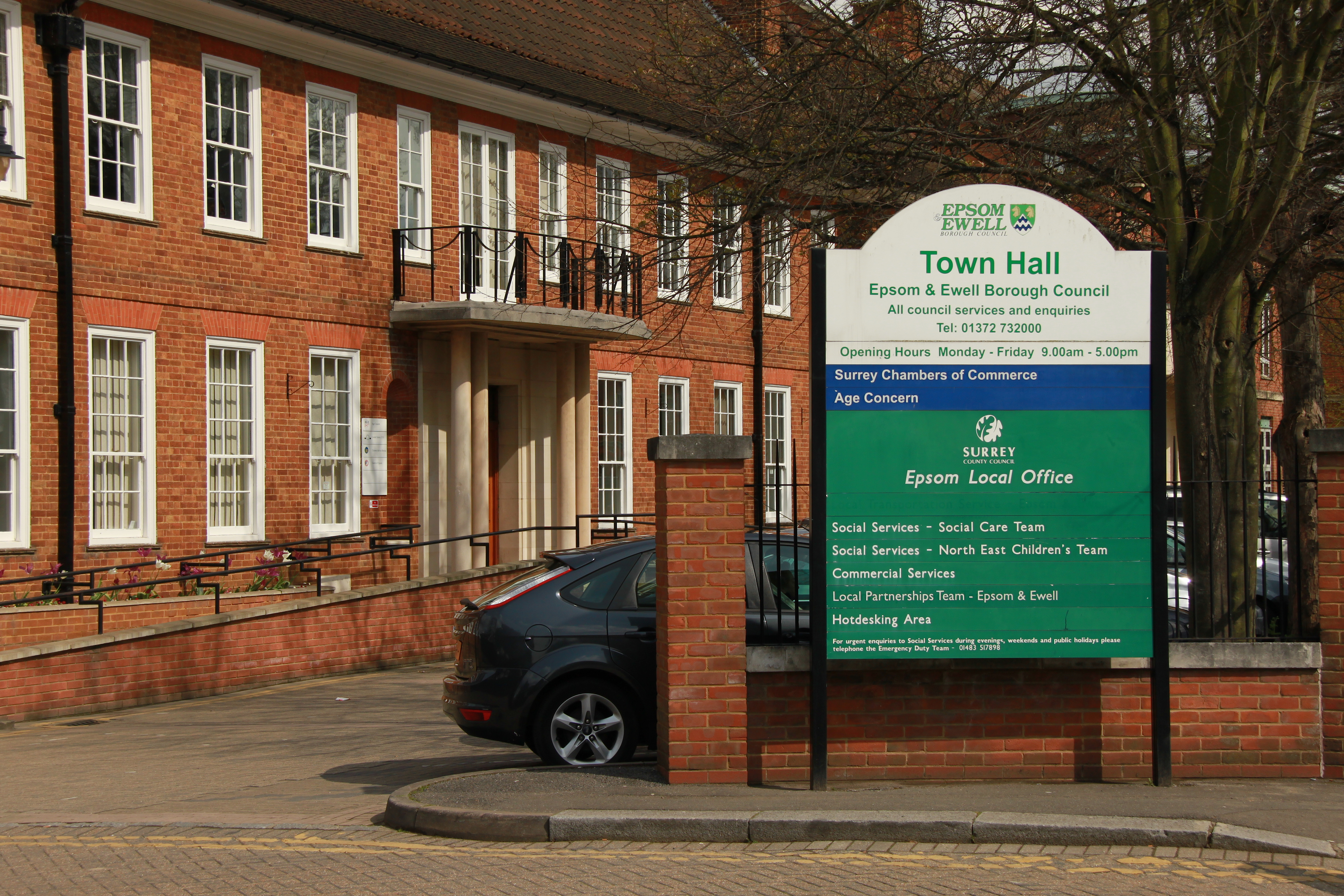
Epsom Town Hall

Epsom is divided between five wards, each of which elects three councillors to Epsom and Ewell Borough Council. The five wards are: "Stamford", "Court", "Town", "College" and "Woodcote".

Since 1995, the Borough of Epsom and Ewell has been twinned with Chantilly in northern France.

== Demography and housing ==
In the 2011 census, the combined population of the college, Court, Stamford, Town and Woodcote wards was 31,489.

2011 Census Households
| Ward | Population | Households | % Owned outright | % Owned with a loan | hectares |
|---|---|---|---|---|---|
| College | 5,873 | 2,248 | 41.1 | 35.9 | 316 |
| Court | 6,830 | 2,567 | 13.8 | 39.8 | 213 |
| Stamford | 6,088 | 2,348 | 38.5 | 43.7 | 436 |
| Town | 6,979 | 3,154 | 27 | 29.1 | 136 |
| Woodcote | 5,719 | 2,286 | 41.4 | 37.9 | 703 |
| Regional average | | | 35.1 | 32.5 | |

2011 Census Homes
| Ward | Detached | Semi-detached | Terraced | Flats and apartments | Caravans/temporary/mobile homes/houseboats | Shared between households |
|---|---|---|---|---|---|---|
| College | 1,040 | 425 | 144 | 622 | 0 | 17 |
| Court | 160 | 721 | 947 | 738 | 1 | 0 |
| Stamford | 707 | 995 | 300 | 346 | 0 | 0 |
| Town | 237 | 849 | 455 | 1,584 | 2 | 27 |
| Woodcote | 1,111 | 513 | 232 | 430 | 0 | 0 |

== Public services ==
=== Utilities ===
The public gas supply to Epsom began in 1839, when the Epsom and Ewell Gas Company purchased land on East Street for the town gasworks. Initially coal was transported by road from Battersea, but was delivered by train following the opening of the railway in 1847. Gas-powered street lighting was installed in the town centre by 1840. The Epsom and Ewell Gas Company was amalgamated with the Wandsworth and Putney Gas Light & Coke Company and the Mitcham and Wimbledon District Gas Light Company in 1912.

The Epsom waterworks were established on East Road in 1853. By 1870, there were at least two wells on the site, which supplied water to the town. Until the mid-19th century, sewage was disposed of in cesspits, however the high water table in the town often lead to drinking water becoming contaminated. The pond in the centre of High Street, which had become polluted with waste, was filled in 1854 under the direction of the newly formed local board of health. The first sewerage system was created the same year, which included the construction of a sewage farm on Hook Road (then known as Kingston Lane). A comprehensive drainage plan was produced in 1895, after the formation of Epsom UDC, and arrangements were made to share the Leatherhead sewage outfall. The site of the sewage farm was redeveloped and is now the Longmead Industrial Estate. Under the Water Act 1973, control of the water supply passed to the Thames Water Authority, which was privatised as Thames Water in 1989.

An electricity generating station was opened in 1902 in Depot Road. Initially it was capable of generating 220 kW of power, but by the time of its closure in 1939, its installed capacity was 2 MW. Under the Electricity (Supply) Act 1926, Epsom was connected to the National Grid, initially to a 33 kV supply ring, which linked the town to Croydon, Leatherhead, Dorking and Reigate. In 1939, the ring was connected to the Wimbledon-Woking main via a 132 kV substation at Leatherhead.

=== Emergency services and justice ===
Following the County Courts Act 1848, a courthouse was built in Epsom. The County and Magistrates' Courts closed in 2010. Epsom Police Station was opened in Church Street in July 1963. The Epsom force had been part of the Metropolitan Police since 1829, but was transferred to Surrey Police in April 2000.

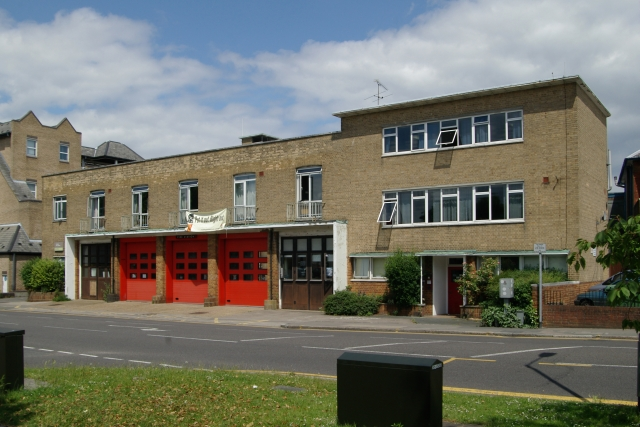
Epsom Fire Station, Church Street

Epsom is thought to have acquired a "manual" fire engine in around the 1760s. It was operated by volunteers and was kept at the clock tower in the High Street. The first full-time brigade was established in 1870 and, by the end of the century, was based on Waterloo Road. The current fire station in Church Street was opened in 1937. In 2021, the fire authority for Epsom is Surrey County Council and the statutory fire service is Surrey Fire and Rescue Service. Epsom Ambulance Station is run by the South East Coast Ambulance Service.

=== Healthcare ===
Epsom Cottage Hospital, the first hospital in Epsom, was opened in Pikes Hill in 1873. It moved to Hawthorne Place in 1877 and, in 1889, a new building was constructed in Alexandra Road to celebrate Queen Victoria's Diamond Jubilee. The suffragette, Emily Davison, died at the hospital after being hit by King George V's horse at the 1913 Derby. Epsom Cottage Hospital officially closed in 1988, however the premises are used today as a community hospital offering physiotherapy and rehabilitation services.

Epsom Hospital was built by the Poor Law Guardians adjacent to the workhouse on Dorking Road in 1890. It was made the responsibility of Surrey County Council in 1930 and became part of the NHS in 1948. Since April 1999, it has been run by Epsom and St Helier University Hospitals NHS Trust, following a merger between the Epsom Health Care and St Helier NHS Trusts. Epsom Hospital has an A&E department.

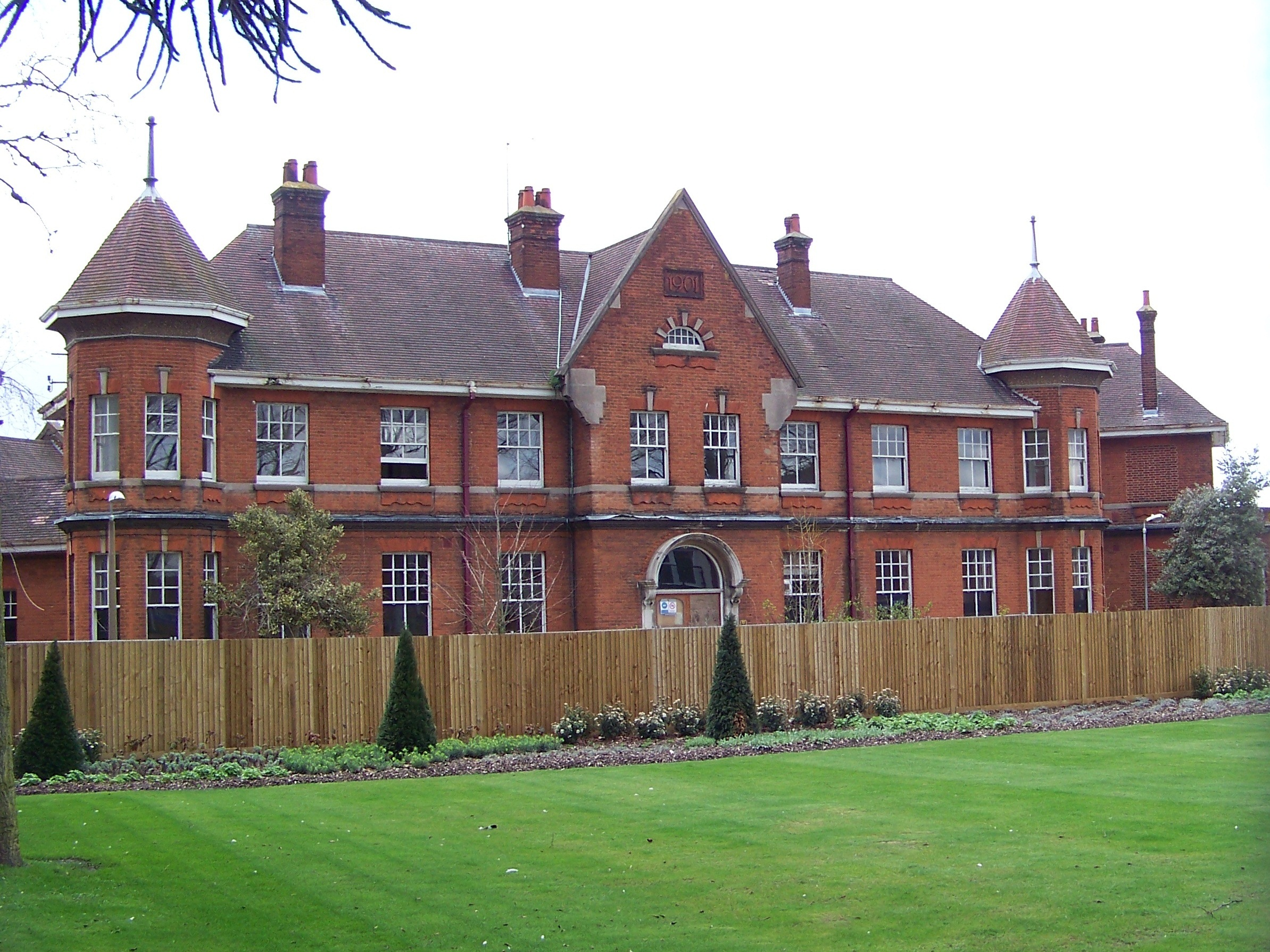
St Ebba's Hospital, designed by William Clifford Smith, was opened in 1903.

The Epsom Cluster was a group of five psychiatric hospitals, built to the west of Epsom on land purchased by London County Council in 1896. The Manor Asylum was the first to be opened in 1899 and the fifth, West Park Asylum, was fully completed in June 1924, having been used by the Canadian military during WWI. A light railway was constructed to deliver building materials and coal to the construction sites. Clean water was supplied from a borehole and a power station was constructed to provide electricity to the five institutions. All of the hospitals closed during the 1990s and 2000s and their sites have since been redeveloped for housing.

As of 2021, the town has three GP practices.

== Transport ==
=== Bus ===
Epsom is linked by a number of bus routes to surrounding towns and villages in north Surrey and south London. Operators serving the town include Falcon Buses, London United and Go-Ahead London.

=== Train ===
Epsom railway station is a short distance to the north of the town centre and is managed by Southern. The current station building was opened in 2013, following a three-year, £20 million redevelopment. It is served by trains to London Victoria and London Bridge via Sutton, to London Waterloo via Wimbledon, to Horsham via Dorking and to Guildford via Bookham. (Note: Epsom Downs racecourse is served by Epsom Downs and Tattenham Corner railway stations, both of which are in the Borough of Reigate and Banstead.)

=== Long-distance footpath ===
The Thames Down Link long-distance footpath between Kingston upon Thames and Box Hill runs through Horton Country Park and across Epsom Common.

== Education ==
=== Further and Higher Education ===
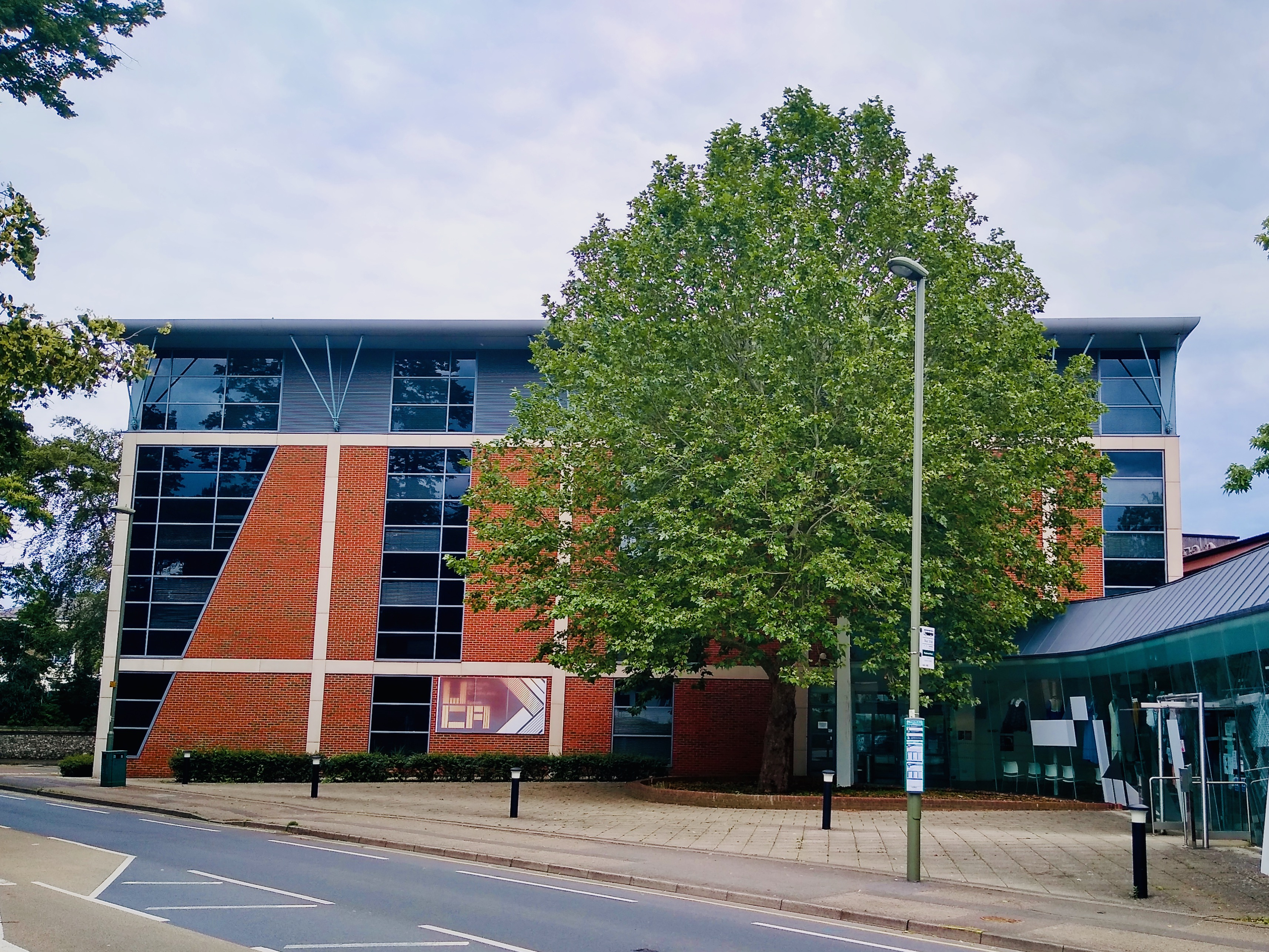
University for the Creative Arts, Epsom campus

The Epsom campus of the University for the Creative Arts was founded as the Epsom Technical Institute & School of Art in 1896. The original building in Church Street was designed by John Hatchard-Smith in the English Renaissance style and was financed by public subscription. It moved to new premises in Ashley Road in 1973 and merged with the West Surrey College of Art and Design to form the Surrey Institute of Art and Design in 1994. The combined institution was granted university college status in 1999. In 2005, it merged with the Kent Institute of Art and Design to become the University for the Creative Arts.

Laine Theatre Arts is an independent performing arts college, founded by Betty Laine in 1974. It prepares students for careers in professional musical theatre and teaches the core skills of dance, singing and acting. Alumni include Victoria Beckham, Kerry Ellis, Ben Richards and Sarah Hadland.

=== Maintained schools ===
Blenheim High School opened in 1997 and it became an academy in 2012.

Glyn School was founded as the Epsom County School in 1927 and became a boys' grammar school in 1944. It was renamed Glyn Grammar School in 1954, after Sir Arthur Glyn, the first chairman of the school Governing Body. It became a boys' comprehensive school in 1976 and its name changed again to Glyn/ADT School of Technology in 1994. The school gained academy status in 2011.

Rosebery School was opened in 1921 as the Epsom County Secondary School for Girls. In 1927, it moved to its current site on land donated by Lord Rosebery, acquiring its present name at the same time. It became an academy in 2011.

Both Glyn School and Rosebery School are part of the multi-academy trust GLF Schools

=== Independent schools ===
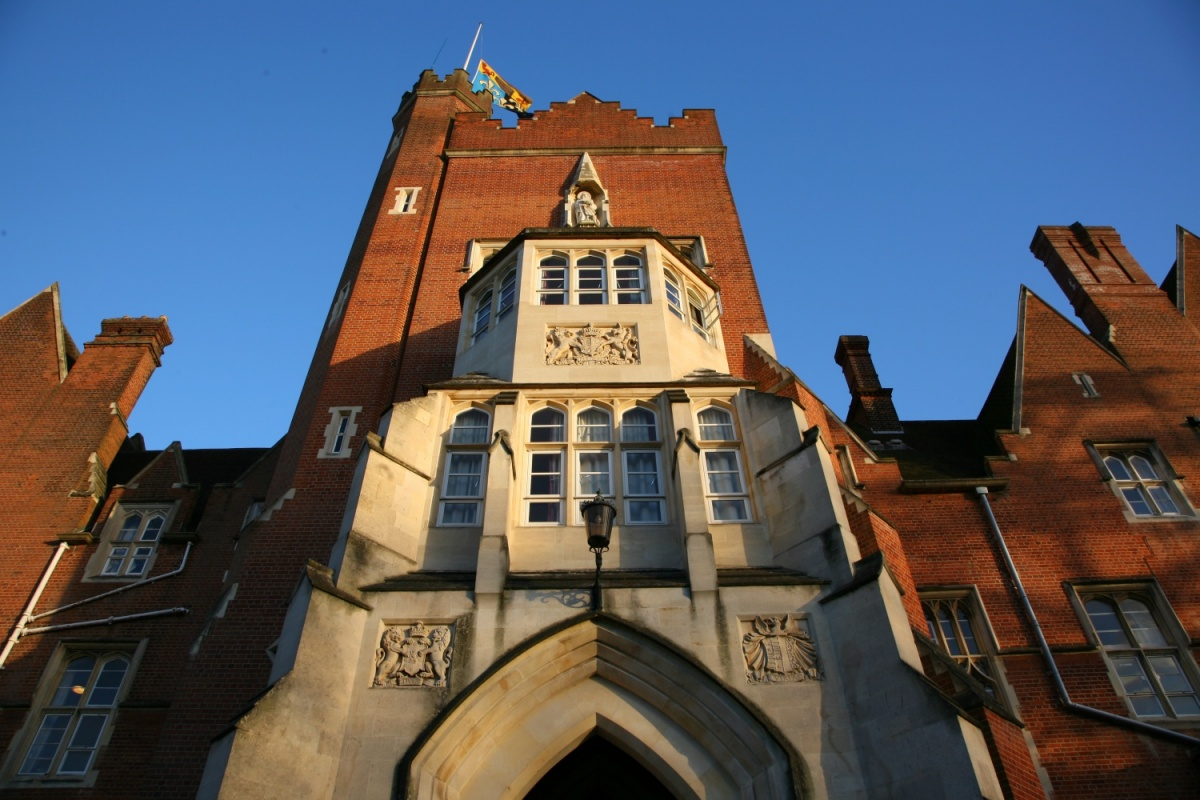
Epsom College

Epsom College was founded in 1851 as the Medical Benevolent College by the physician, John Propert. The school buildings were opened in 1855 by Prince Albert and the first cohort of 100 pupils were all sons of medics. By 1865, the school roll had grown to 300 and had been opened to those able to pay fees. The Grade II-listed chapel, dedicated to St Luke, was built in 1857 and was enlarged by Arthur Blomfield in 1895. Girls were first admitted to the school in 1976 and Epsom College became fully coeducational in 1996.

Kingswood House School is a preparatory school to the west of the town centre. It was founded in 1899 and moved to its present site on West Hill in 1920. Since the 1960s it has operated exclusively as a day school. Girls were admitted for the first time in September 2021.

== Places of worship ==
=== St Martin's Church ===
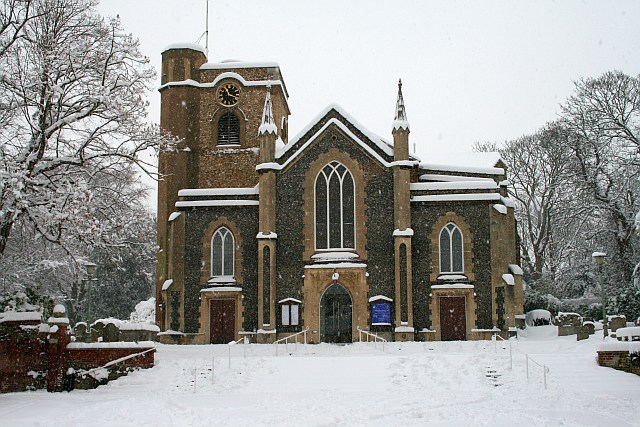
St Martin's Church, Epsom (Note: The church is dedicated to Martin of Tours.)

The Domesday Book entry for Epsom includes two churches, one of which is thought to have been on the site of the present St Martin's Church. The oldest part of the current building is the flint tower, which dates from around 1450. Much of the remainder of the church dates from a rebuilding in 1824, with the exception of the choir, chancel and transepts, which were added by Sir Charles Nicholson in 1908. The 15th century spire was damaged in a storm in 1947 and was subsequently demolished.

Following the 1824 rebuilding, many of the memorials from the medieval church were reinstalled in the new church, including several by the sculptor John Flaxman. The parish chest, made from carved Spanish mahogany, is reputed to contain wood recovered from ships of the Spanish Armada. The church also holds a copy of the so-called vinegar bible of 1717. The east window, by the local designer F.A. Oldaker, shows Christ the Light of the World, in the style of the painting by William Holman Hunt.

=== Christ Church ===
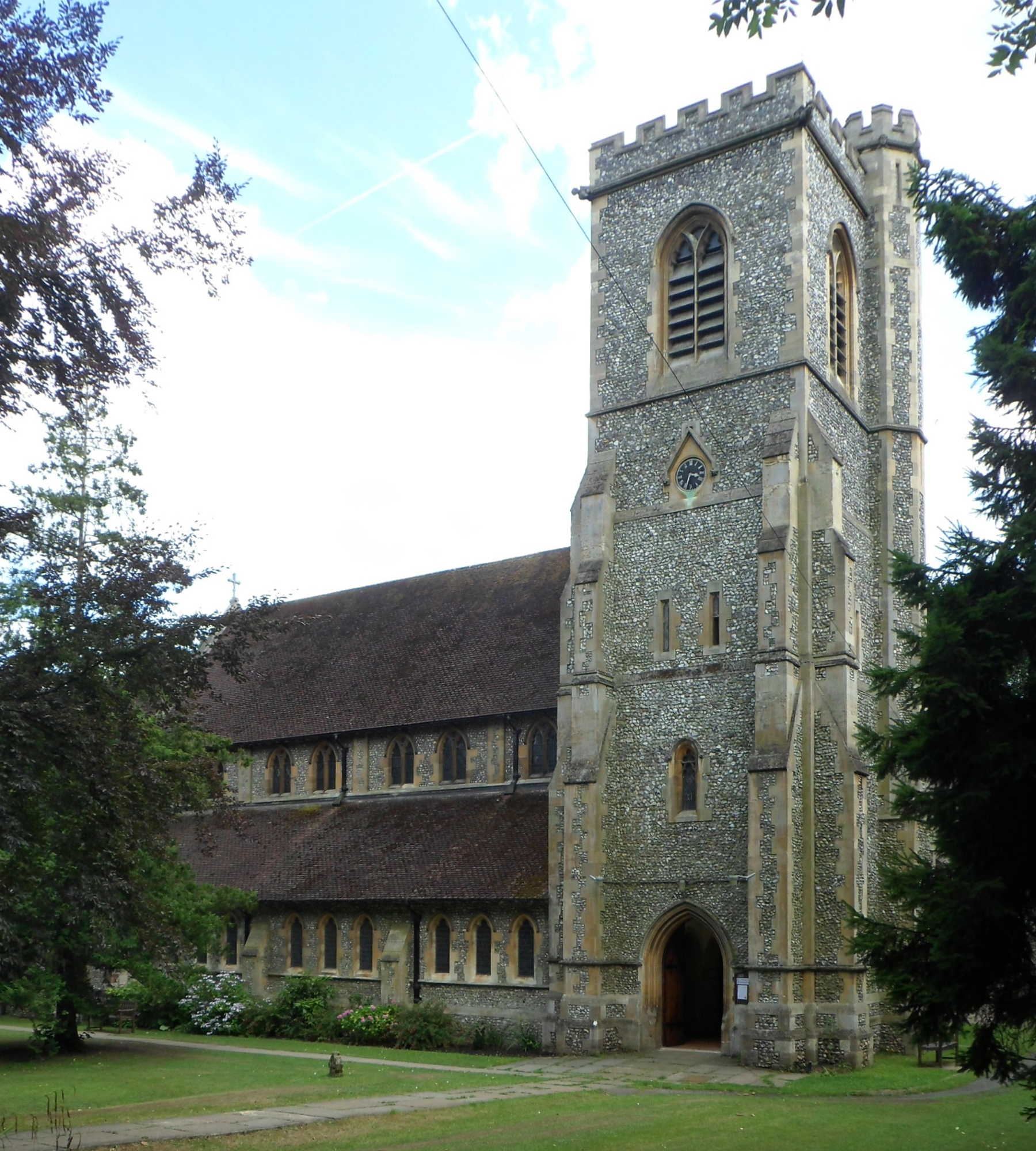
Christ Church, Epsom Common

Christ Church was founded as a chapel of ease to St Martin's in 1843. Initially a temporary structure was provided until the first permanent building was opened in 1845. In July 1874, Epsom parish was divided into two, with the western half becoming the new parish of Epsom Common. The chapel of ease became the parish church, but was considered too small for the congregation. Its replacement, the present church, was designed in the Gothic revival style by Arthur Blomfield and opened in 1876. It is constructed from flint with stone dressings and there is a clerestory above the nave. The tower and south aisle were added in 1879 and 1887 respectively.

The chancel arch is decorated with a mural of Christ flanked by angels, beneath which is the rood screen, made of wrought iron and bronze, which was erected 1909. The alabaster reredos, behind the altar, contains figurative scenes in mosaic and the east wall is decorated with panels depicting the four Evangelists. The pulpit dates from 1880 and was originally in St Andrew's Church, Surbiton. The interior of the church was reordered between 1987 and 1995 to increase the versatility of the nave.

=== United Reformed Church ===
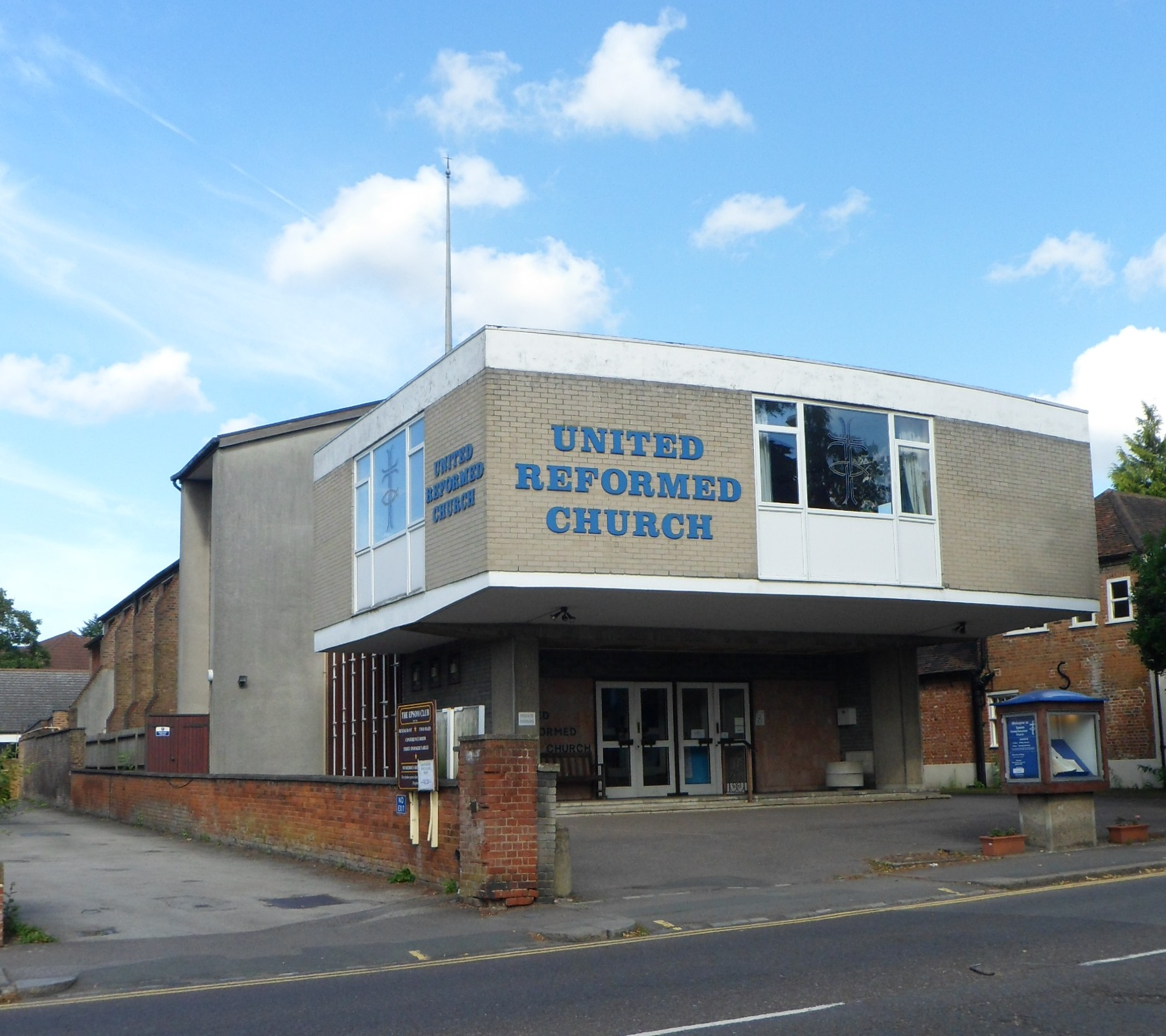
United Reformed Church, Church Road

Following the Act of Uniformity 1662, local nonconformists began meeting in small groups at Ewell, before establishing themselves at Epsom in around 1688. The Dissenting community flourished in the town in the late 17th and early 18th centuries and, in 1720, the first purpose-built meeting house was constructed on Church Street. As the population of the town decreased in the later 18th century, the congregation declined and the meeting house appears to have been sold by 1803, but remained in use for worship. A new, Gothic revival congregational church was opened in 1905 on the same site. Much of the church, including the roof and organ, was destroyed in fire in 1961, but the building was rebuilt two years later. It was renamed Epsom United Reformed Church in 1972.

=== St Joseph's Catholic Church ===
The Catholic parish of St Joseph, traces its origins to 1859, when the congregation began to meet regularly for mass in the parlour of a house in Stanley Villas. The first permanent church, in Heathcote Road, was completed in 1866 and was constructed of local red brick with Bath stone dressings. It was extended in 1930 and the west end was rebuilt between 1959 and 1961, but by 1996 it had become clear that it was inadequate for the size of the congregation. Land in St Margaret's Drive was purchased from the county council and construction of a new church began in 1999. The old church was demolished in 2000 and its replacement opened in April 2001. The new church was dedicated by Cormac Murphy-O'Connor in May 2001.

== Culture ==
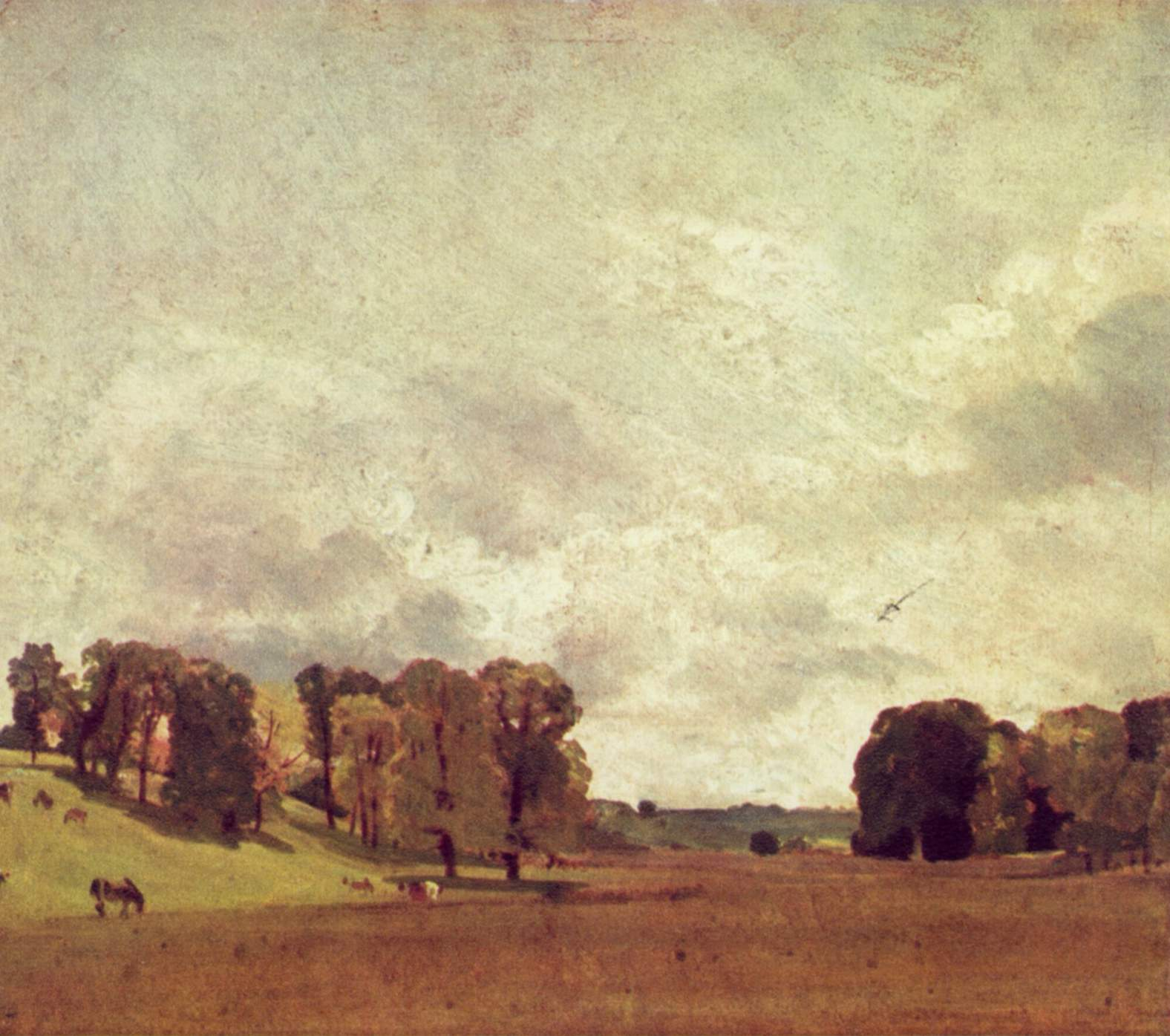
View at Epsom (1809) by John Constable

=== Literature ===
Epsom Wells, a restoration comedy written by Thomas Shadwell (c. 1642 – 1692), is one of a series of plays set in English spa towns. It received its first performance in 1673 at the Duke's Theatre in London. A revival of the play in the 1690s included new incidental music by the composer, Henry Purcell.

Epsom Downs, a comic play written by Howard Brenton (born 1942), is set at the 1977 Epsom Derby. It received its first performance in 1977 at The Roundhouse in London.

=== Music ===
Epsom Choral Society was founded in 1922 by the publisher, Humphrey Milford. His son, the composer Robin Milford was the first conductor. The choir has commissioned works from the British composers Cecilia McDowall and Jonathan Willcocks. Epsom Symphony Orchestra for amateur musicians was founded in 1951 and gives four concerts each year at the Epsom Playhouse. The Epsom & Ewell Silver Band is based in Epsom. It is a traditional British brass band and was founded in 1910 as the Banstead Silver Band.

=== Paintings ===
The landscape painter, John Constable (1776–1837), visited Epsom regularly between 1806 and 1812. His works include several depictions of the town, including View at Epsom (1809), held by The Tate. The gallery also owns paintings of horse racing taking place on the Downs, including works by Alfred Munnings (1878–1959) and William Powell Frith (1819–1909). The 1821 Derby at Epsom (1821) by Théodore Géricault (1791–1824) is held by The Louvre. Paintings of Nonsuch Palace, attributed to Hendrick Danckerts (c. 1625–1680), and of the view from Epsom Downs, by William Henry David Birch (1895–1968), are held by Epsom Town Hall.

=== Public art ===
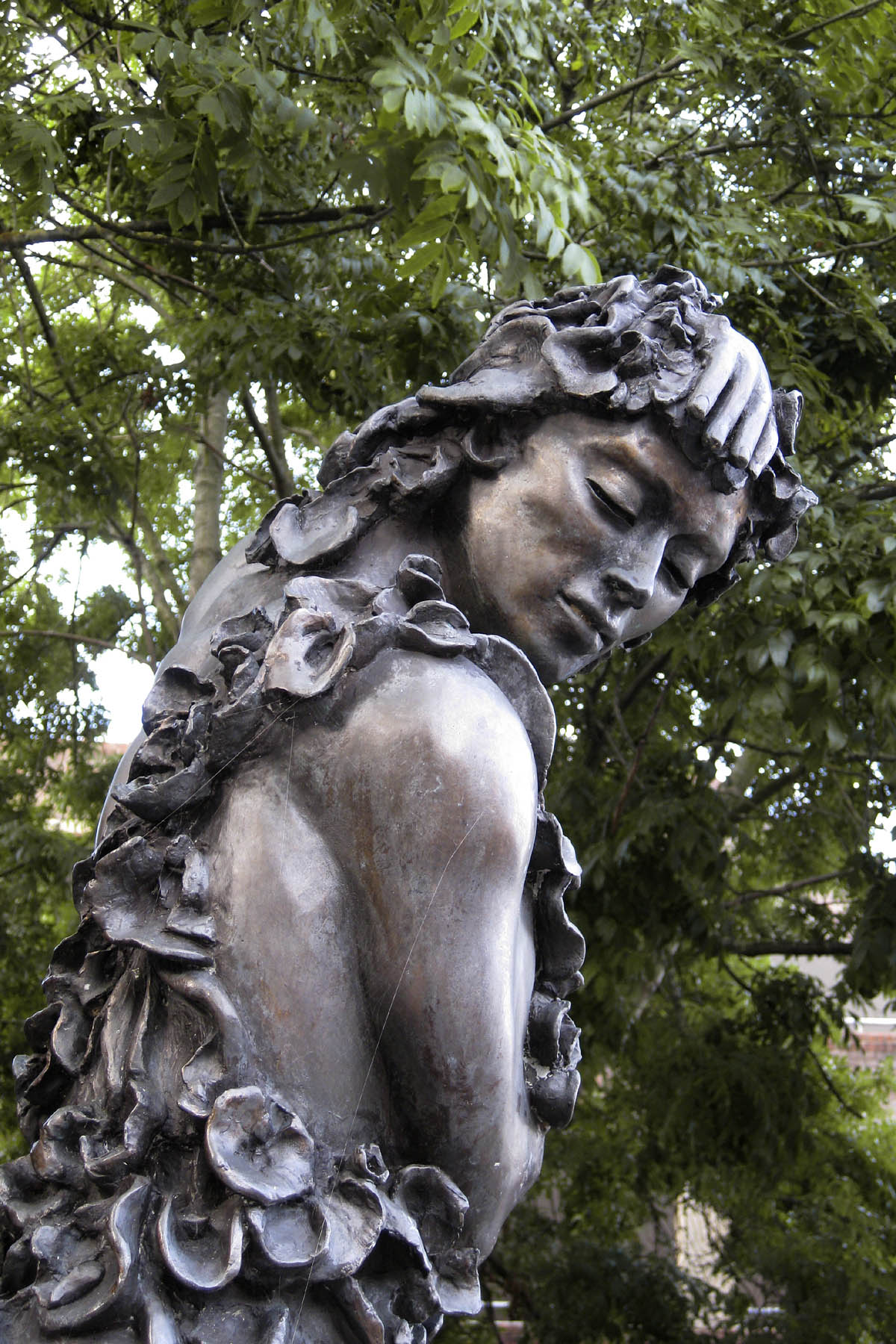
Spectre de la Rose by Tom Merrifield

A statuette by the Australian sculptor Tom Merrifield was erected outside the Playhouse in 1999. It depicts the dancer, John Gilpin, performing the title role of Le Spectre de la rose from the ballet by Jean-Louis Vaudoyer.

Evocation of Speed, a bronze sculpture by Judy Boyt, was installed at Epsom Square in 2002. It depicts two horses - Diomed, the winner of the first Derby in 1780 and Galileo, the winner of the 2001 race. The depictions of the two riders show how the clothing worn by jockeys has changed over time.

A statue of Emily Davison by the artist Christine Charlesworth, was installed in the marketplace in 2021, following a campaign by volunteers from the Emily Davison Memorial Project.

=== Theatre ===
Epsom Playhouse opened in 1984 as part of The Ashley Centre development. It has two performance spaces: The main auditorium seats a maximum of 450. The Myers Studio, which has an octagonal floor plan, seats 80 and is suited to smaller-scale drama, comedy and jazz performances.

=== Podcasts ===
British comedy podcast My Dad Wrote a Porno sets the second episode of its third season, Epsom Hall, in the eponymous building.

== Sport ==
=== Rainbow Leisure Centre ===
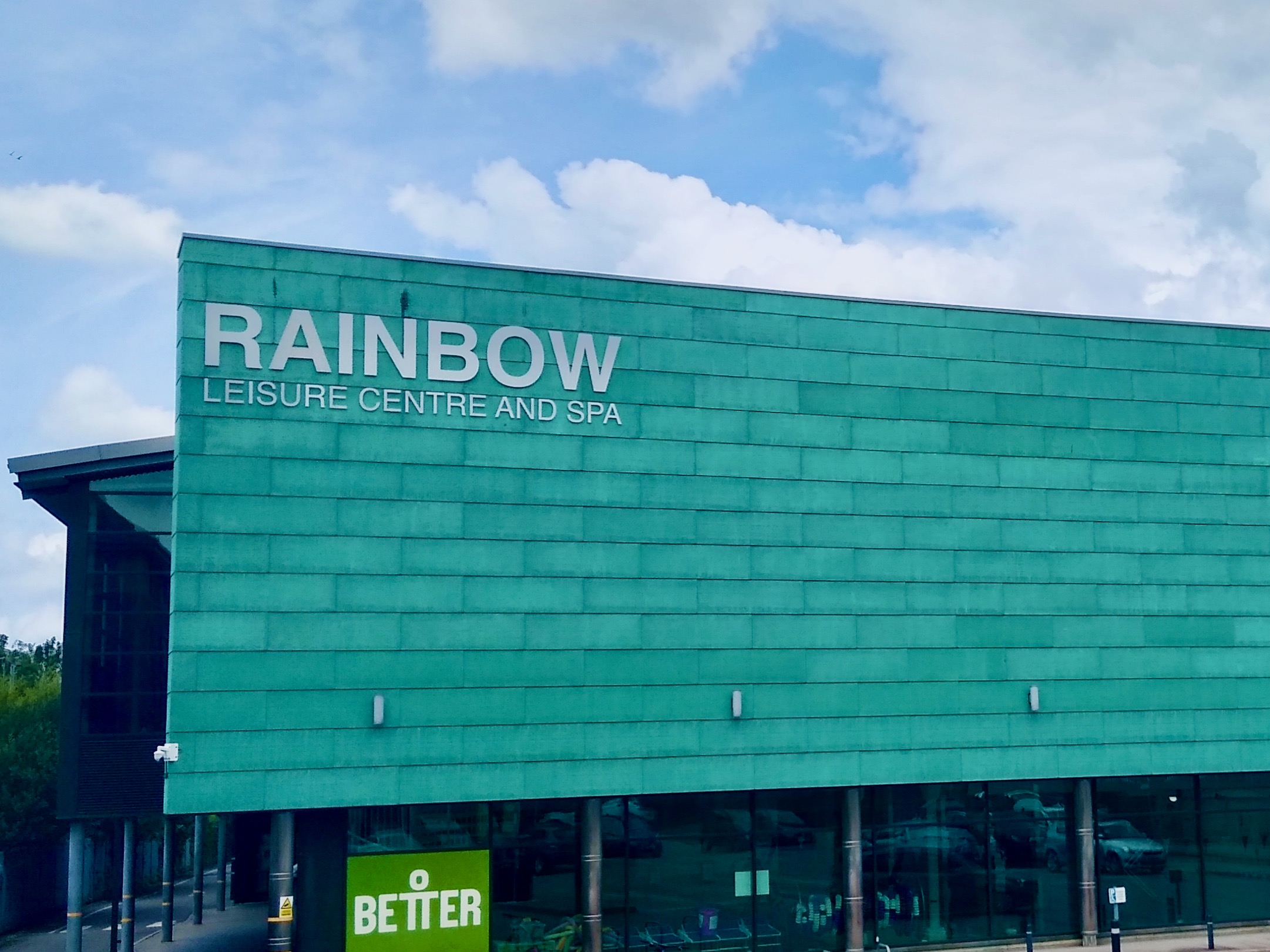
Rainbow Leisure Centre

The current Rainbow Leisure Centre opened in 2003, replacing the original facility which dated from the 1930s. The centre includes swimming pools, two dance studios and a sports hall with four badminton courts. In 2011, a spa facility was added as part of an extensive refurbishment, during which the gym equipment was also upgraded. The centre is managed by Greenwich Leisure Limited (GLL) under their "Better" brand.

=== Association Football ===
Epsom & Ewell F.C. traces its origins to the Epsom Juniors Cricket Club, founded in March 1918. A year later the team began to play football and was a founder member of the Sutton & District League in 1920. The team changed its name to Epsom Town F.C. in 1922 and played its home games at the Horton Hospital Sports Ground. The club became Epsom F.C. in 1934 and adopted its current name in 1960. Since the start of the 2020/21 season, the club has been based at Fetcham Grove, the Leatherhead F.C. stadium.

=== Cricket ===
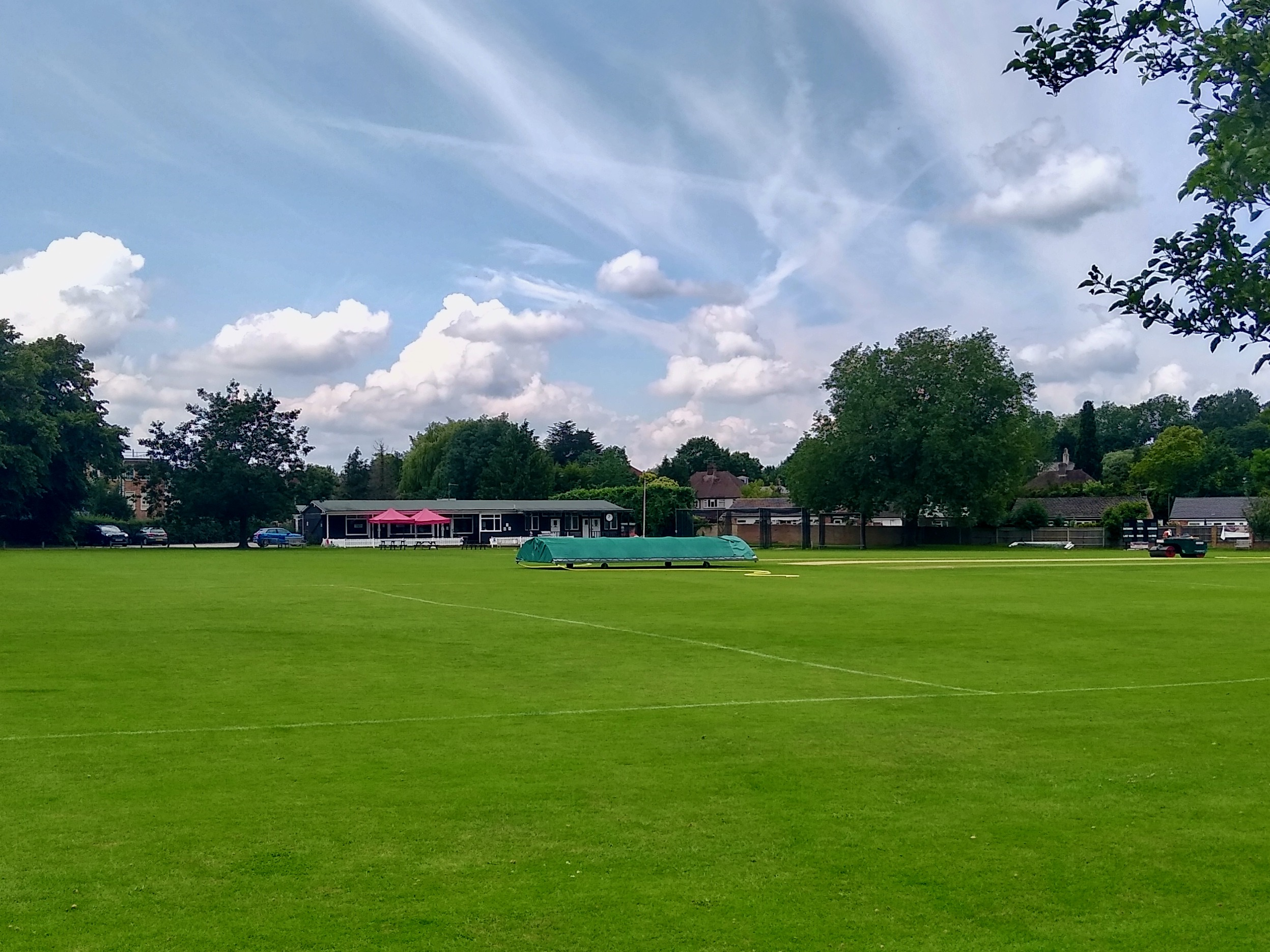
Epsom Cricket Club ground

The earliest reference to cricket being played in the town is from 1711 and Epsom Cricket Club is thought to have been founded in around 1800. During the early 19th century, matches appear to have taken place on the Downs and also at Stamford Green on Epsom Common. By 1860, the club had established a new ground on Woodcote Road, on land belonging to Edward Richard Northey, and plays its home games there today.

=== Hockey ===
Epsom Hockey Club is a field hockey club that competes in the London Hockey League and the South East Hockey League. It is thought to have been founded in around 1900 and was well established by the 1909/10 season. Initially, home games were played at the Court Recreation Ground, but the club established a permanent base in Woodcote Road after the Second World War.

=== Tennis ===
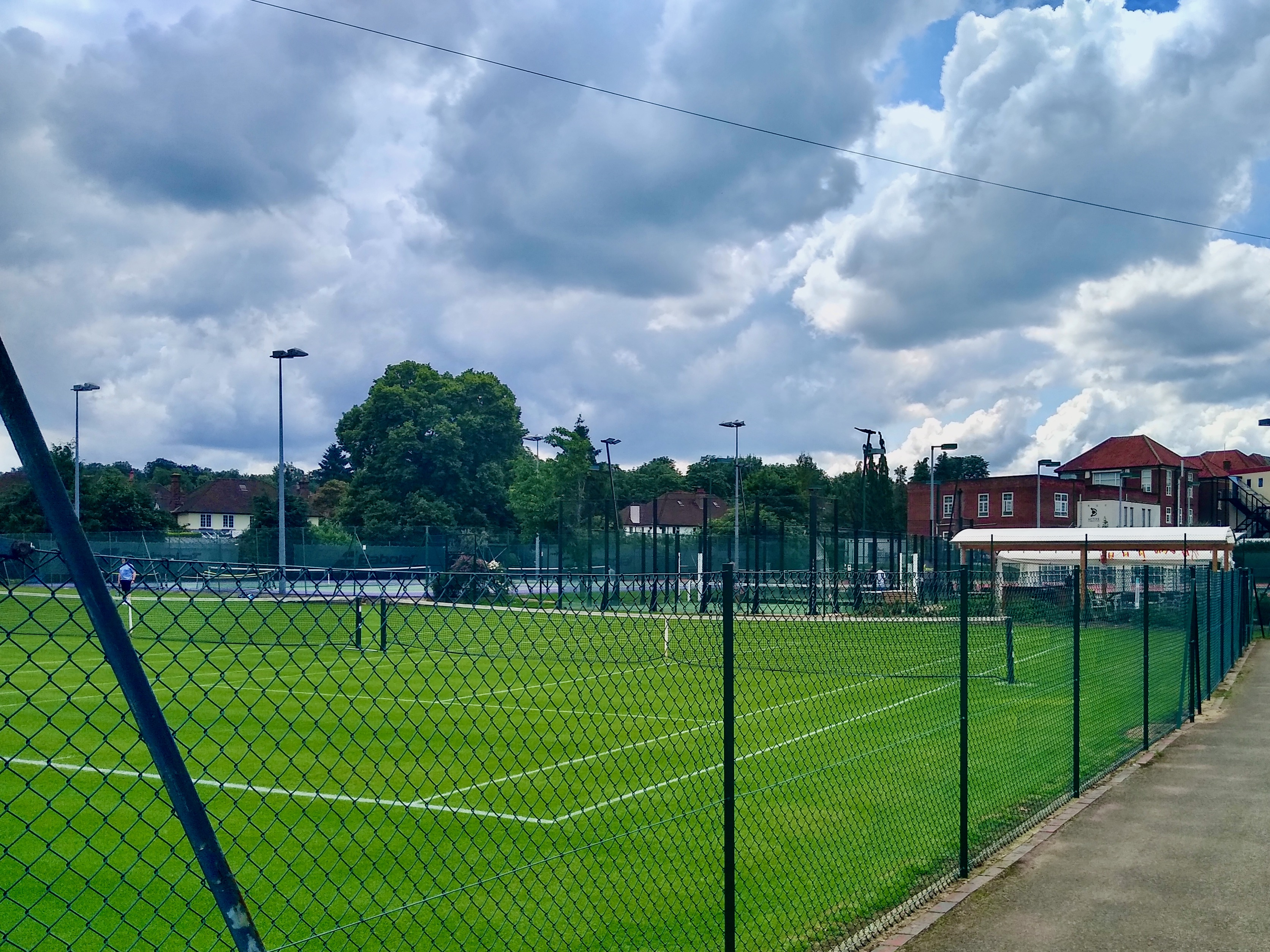
Epsom Tennis Club

Epsom Lawn Tennis Club was founded as a croquet club in the 1850s, based at Woodcote House. By the 1870s, tennis became the more important sport and in 1913 the club had five tennis courts and three croquet courts. The last remaining croquet court was converted to a grass tennis court in 1923.

=== Other sports ===
Epsom and Ewell Harriers is a club for track and field athletes, based at the Poole Road Track in Ewell. Epsom Cycling Club was founded in 1891 and is one of the oldest in the country. The club arranges organised rides and regular time trials in the local area. Sutton and Epsom Rugby Football Club was founded in 1881 and their main ground is at Rugby Lane, Cheam.

== Notable buildings and landmarks ==
=== The Ashley Centre ===
Construction of The Ashley Centre was proposed in the late 1970s, following concerns that the retail sector of the local economy was in decline. The shopping centre was designed by Humphrey Wood and the building makes extensive use of steel, glass and marble. A multistorey car park and an office block were included in the scheme, in addition to 23,000 m^{2} (250,000 ft^{2}) of retail space. The centre was opened by Queen Elizabeth II on 24 October 1984 and is named after the adjacent Ashley Road.

=== Ashley House ===
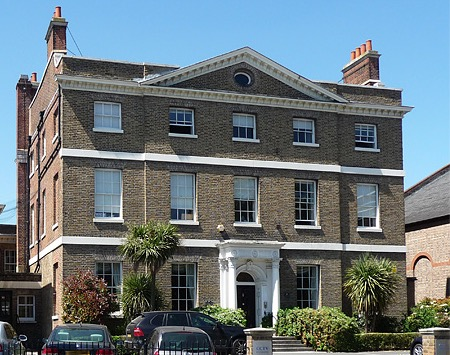
Ashley House

Ashley House is named after Mary Ashley, a former resident who lived at the property until 1849. The three-storey, brick townhouse was constructed in the late 1760s and is protected by a Grade II* listing. It features an Adam-style central doorcase with a composite Tower of the Winds and Ionic columns.

=== Assembly Rooms ===
The Assembly Rooms building was constructed in around 1692, when the spa was at the height of it popularity. It functioned as a meeting place and included a tavern, coffee house and billiard room. A bowling green and a cockpit, in which fighting cocks were set against each other for sport, were also part of the same complex. Following the decline of the spa in the first half of the 18th century, much of the building was converted to shops and to housing for private families. Since April 2002, the Assembly Rooms has operated as a public house, owned by Wetherspoons.

=== Clock Tower ===
The foundation stone for the Clock Tower was laid in November 1847, following the demolition of the watch house which had stood on the site since the 17th century. The 70-foot-tall (21-metre) tower, designed by James Butler and Henry Hodge, is constructed from red and grey brick with ashlar dressings. Initially four lion sculptures made of Caen stone were positioned at each corner of the base, however by 1902 they had been replaced by electric lanterns, which were replaced, in 1920, by the current globe lights. In the same year, the base of the tower was extended to the east and west to provide toilet facilities. Several public events and civic ceremonies have taken place in the area at the base of the tower, including the official granting of the foundation charter of the Borough of Epsom and Ewell in September 1937. In March 2023, following many discussions, the clock tower received a full LED lighting upgrade allowing the tower to change colour.

=== Spread Eagle Walk ===
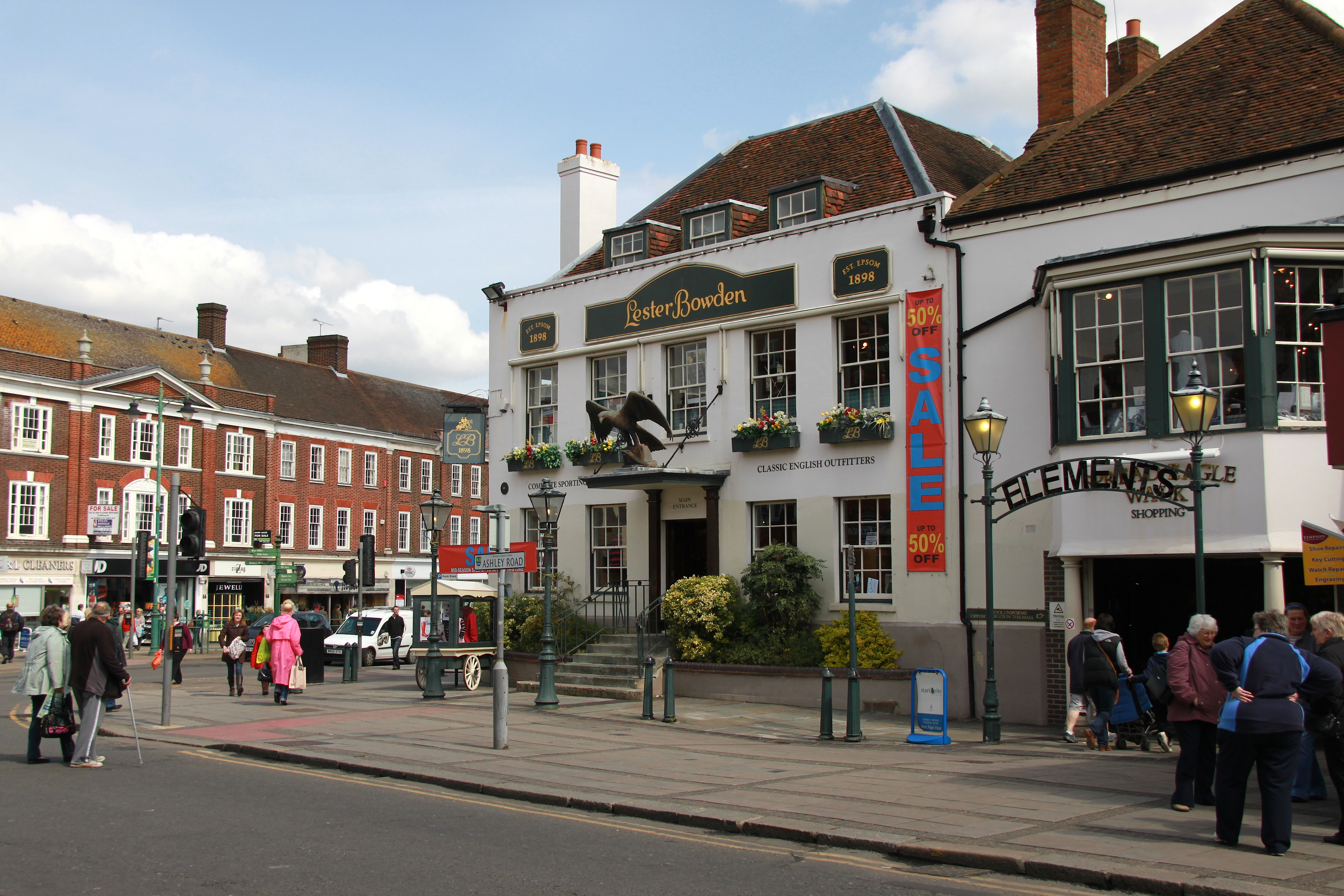
Spread Eagle Walk

The Spread Eagle Walk shopping centre was constructed as a coaching inn in the late 17th century. The main hotel building has two storeys with an attic and basement. The external stucco finish and sash windows are later additions. The distinctive black eagle sculptures above the two porticos are thought to date from the mid-late 19th century. The inn traded as a public house until around 1990, when it closed for renovation. The driveway into the former stables was converted into the main entrance to the shopping centre and in 1994 the main building was occupied by Lester Bowden outfitters, which had been founded by Arthur Bowden at start of the 20th century.

=== Town Hall ===
The neo-Georgian Epsom Town Hall, designed by Hubert Moore Fairweather and William Alfred Pite, was opened in March 1934. The building has served as the headquarters of Epsom UDC, Epsom Borough Council and, since 1974, Epsom and Ewell Borough Council. The New Town Hall was opened in 1992 and is connected to the older building by covered walkways.

=== War memorials ===
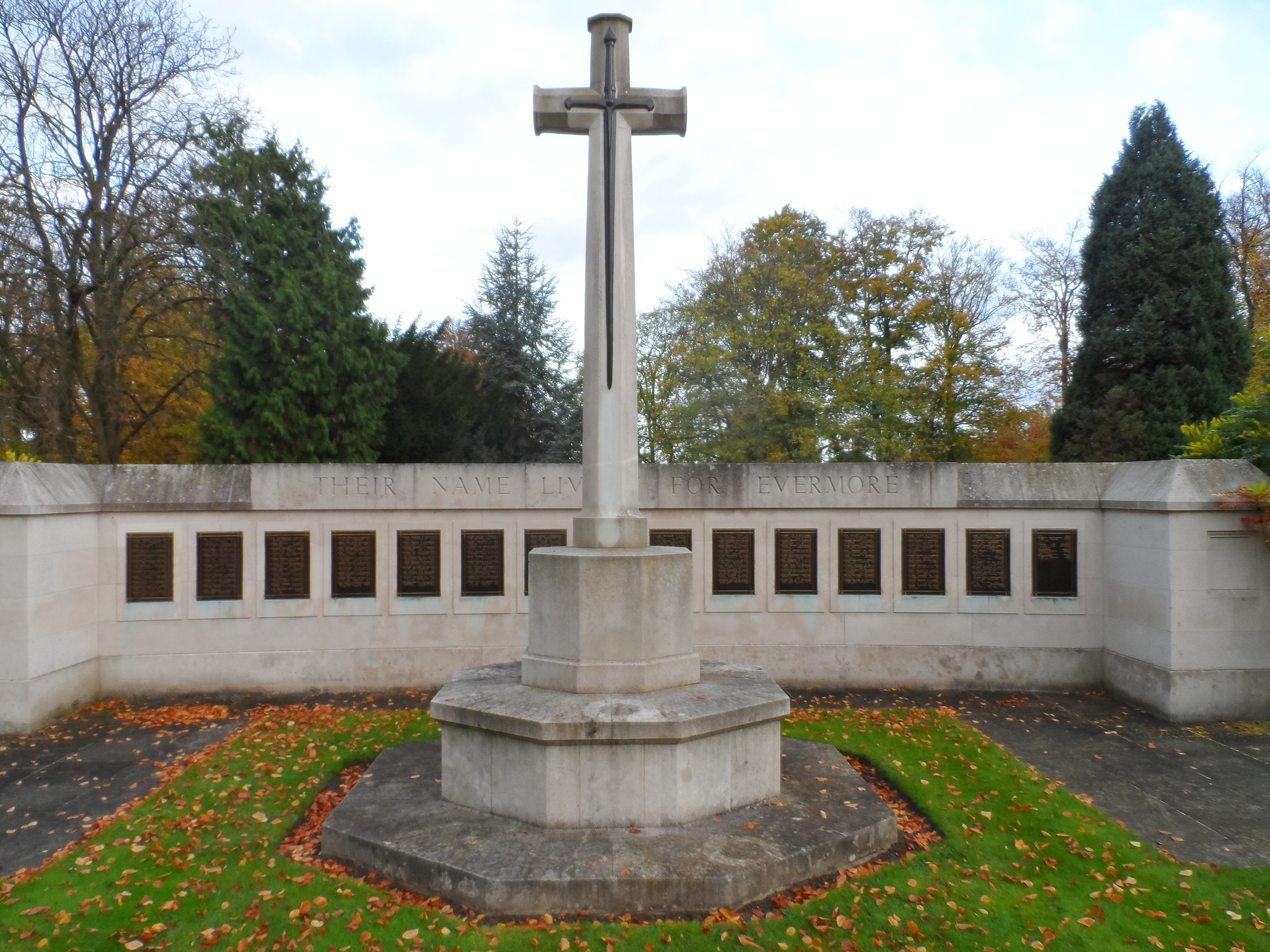
Commonwealth War Graves Memorial, Epsom Cemetery

Epsom War Memorial at Epsom Cemetery was erected in 1921 to commemorate the 256 residents of Epsom and Ewell who had died in the First World War. The memorial consists of a Celtic cross in granite and the gates are dedicated to the 18th, 19th, 20th and 21st Battalions of the Royal Fusiliers, who were billeted in Epsom before the opening of the Woodcote Park camp. Following the end of the Second World War, an additional inscription was added to commemorate those who had died between 1939 and 1945.

The Commonwealth War Graves Memorial was erected in Epsom Cemetery in 1925. It consists of a cross, behind which is a screen wall on which names of 148 Commonwealth soldiers are inscribed. The majority of those commemorated died in the hospitals of the Epsom Cluster.

=== Woodcote Park ===
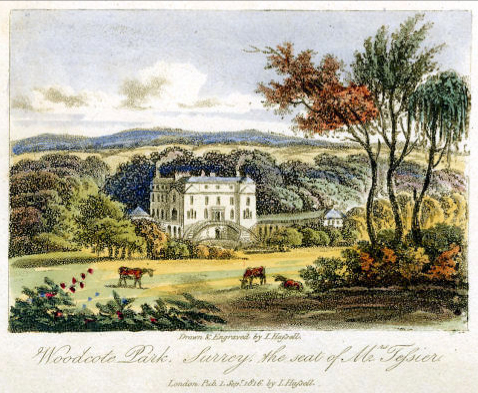
Woodcote Park (c. 1816) engraving by John Hassell

Woodcote Park was created as a hunting park in the mid-12th century by the abbot of Chertsey Abbey. Following the dissolution of the monasteries in the mid-16th century, the park was briefly held by Sir Nicholas Carew, before being annexed to the Honour of Hampton Court. In the mid-17th century, the land was inherited by Elizabeth Mynne, wife of Richard Evelyn, for whom the first mansion house was constructed. The building included decorative features by the sculptor, Grinling Gibbons, and a ceiling by the painter, Antonio Verrio. In 1715, the estate was inherited by Charles Calvert, 5th Baron Baltimore, who commissioned Isaac Ware to rebuild the mansion in the French Rococo Revival style. Some of the features of the original house were reused, including the Verrio ceiling. Shortly before his death, Calvert engaged John Vardy to design a Palladian stone frontage.

Following long periods of ownership by the Tessier and Brooks families during the 19th century, the Royal Automobile Club (R.A.C.) purchased Woodcote Park in 1913. Many of the historic interiors were not required by the R.A.C. and were removed and sold at auction. In 1927, wood panelling and other decorations in the style of Thomas Chippendale, from one of the drawing rooms, were installed in the Museum of Fine Arts at Boston, Massachusetts. The mansion was destroyed by fire in August 1934, but within two years had been rebuilt with an identical exterior appearance. Today the 350-acre (140 ha) site features two 18-hole golf courses, sports and spa facilities, as well as restaurants and guest accommodation. The club also houses a fleet of heritage motor vehicles, owned by the R.A.C.

== Parks and open spaces ==
=== Epsom Common ===
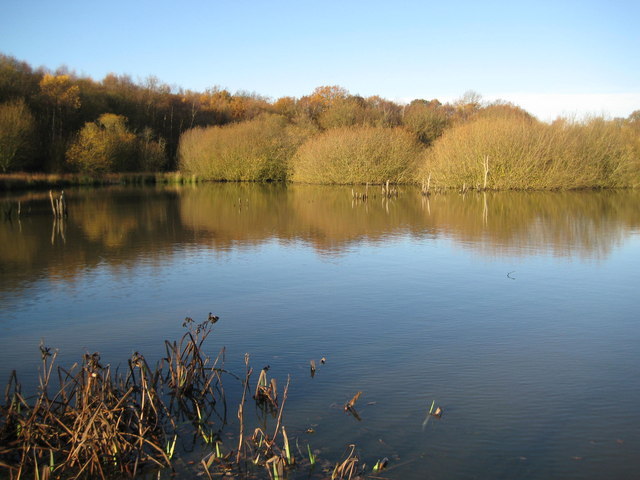
The Great Pond, Epsom Common

During the medieval period, Epsom Common was the manorial waste land and, in the 12th century, the monks of Chertsey Abbey built the Great Pond to rear fish. The first cottages had been built around the edges of the common by 1679 and by the mid-18th century there were over 30, mostly on the land around Stamford Green. The Common was purchased by Epsom Urban District Council (UDC) in 1935 and its successor body, the Borough Council, continues to own and manage it today. Together with the adjacent Ashtead Common, Epsom Common comprises a Site of Special Scientific Interest and is a Local Nature Reserve. The 176-hectare (430-acre) site has a range of distinctive habitats and is a breeding ground for 59 bird species.

=== Epsom Downs ===
Epsom Downs and the neighbouring Walton Downs are to the south east of the town and together comprise 240 hectares (600 acres) of chalk downland. The Downs are owned by Epsom Racecourse and are managed by a board of Conservators under the framework of the Epsom and Walton Downs Regulation Act 1984. A number of rare plants are present, including round-headed rampion, bastard-toadflax and chalk hill eyebright. The area provides a habitat for bird species including the Eurasian skylark. Since 2013, Epsom Downs has been a Site of Nature Conservation Importance.

=== Horton Country Park ===
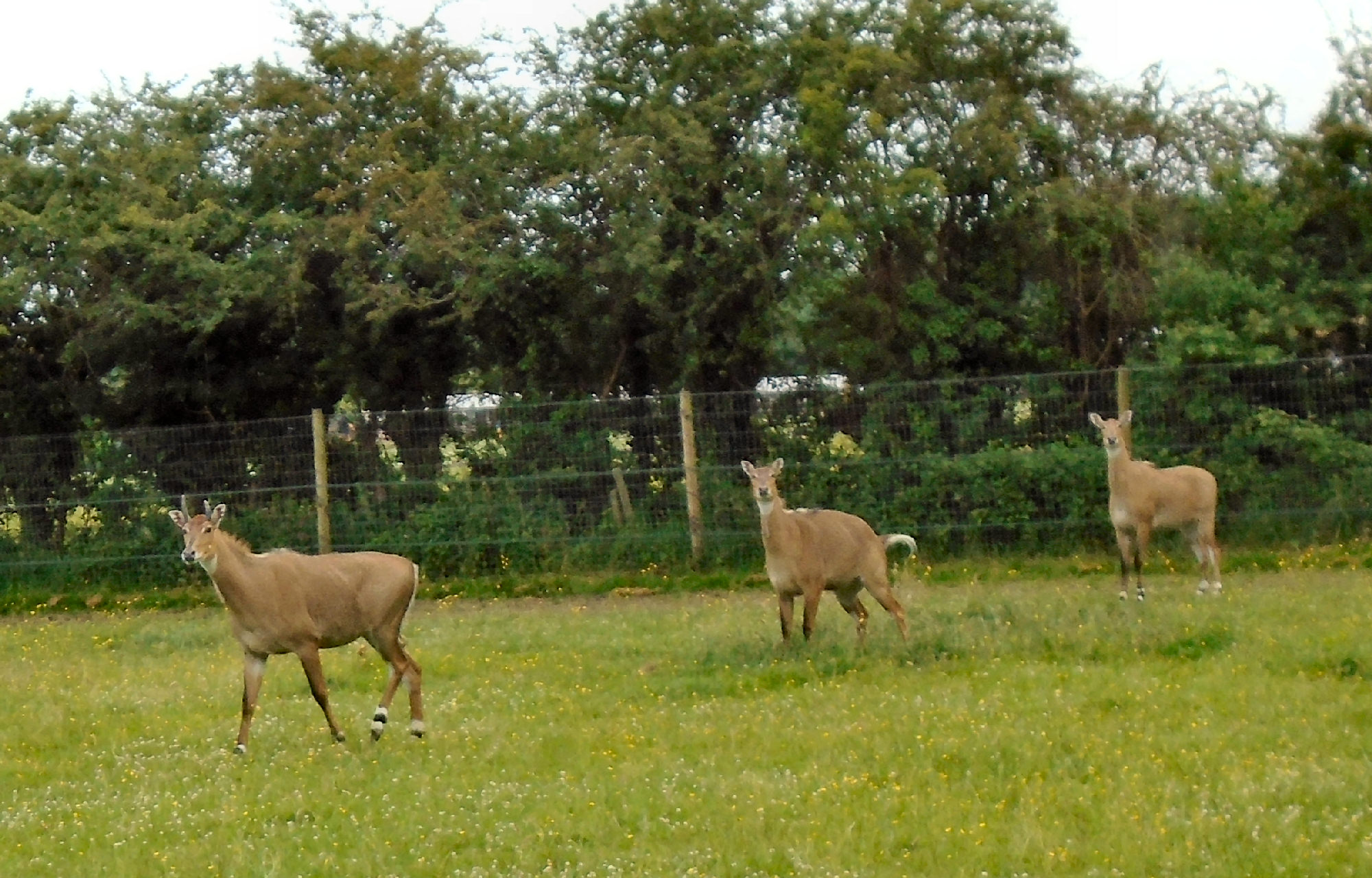
Nilgai at Hobbledown Children's Farm, Horton Country Park

Horton Country Park was created in 1973 from two farms belonging to the Epsom Cluster of psychiatric hospitals and is owned and managed by the Borough Council. Around 152 hectares (380 acres) have been designated a Local Nature Reserve in 2004. The country park includes areas of ancient woodland and provides a habitat for a wide range of mammal, bird and insect species including the green woodpecker and roe deer. It also contains a golf course, equestrian centre and a children's farm.

=== Mounthill Gardens and Rosebery Park ===
Mounthill Gardens, south west of the town centre, was formed from the grounds of two adjacent houses, both purchased by Epsom UDC in 1950. The smaller house, Rosebank, had been bombed during the Second World War and was subsequently demolished by the council. The larger house, Mounthill, was used as offices for a time, before it too was demolished. (Note: The Sadlers Court retirement apartments opened in 1998 on the site of the former Mounthill House.) The two hectares (5 acres) of steeply sloping land surrounding the two buildings was converted into a public park that opened in 1965.

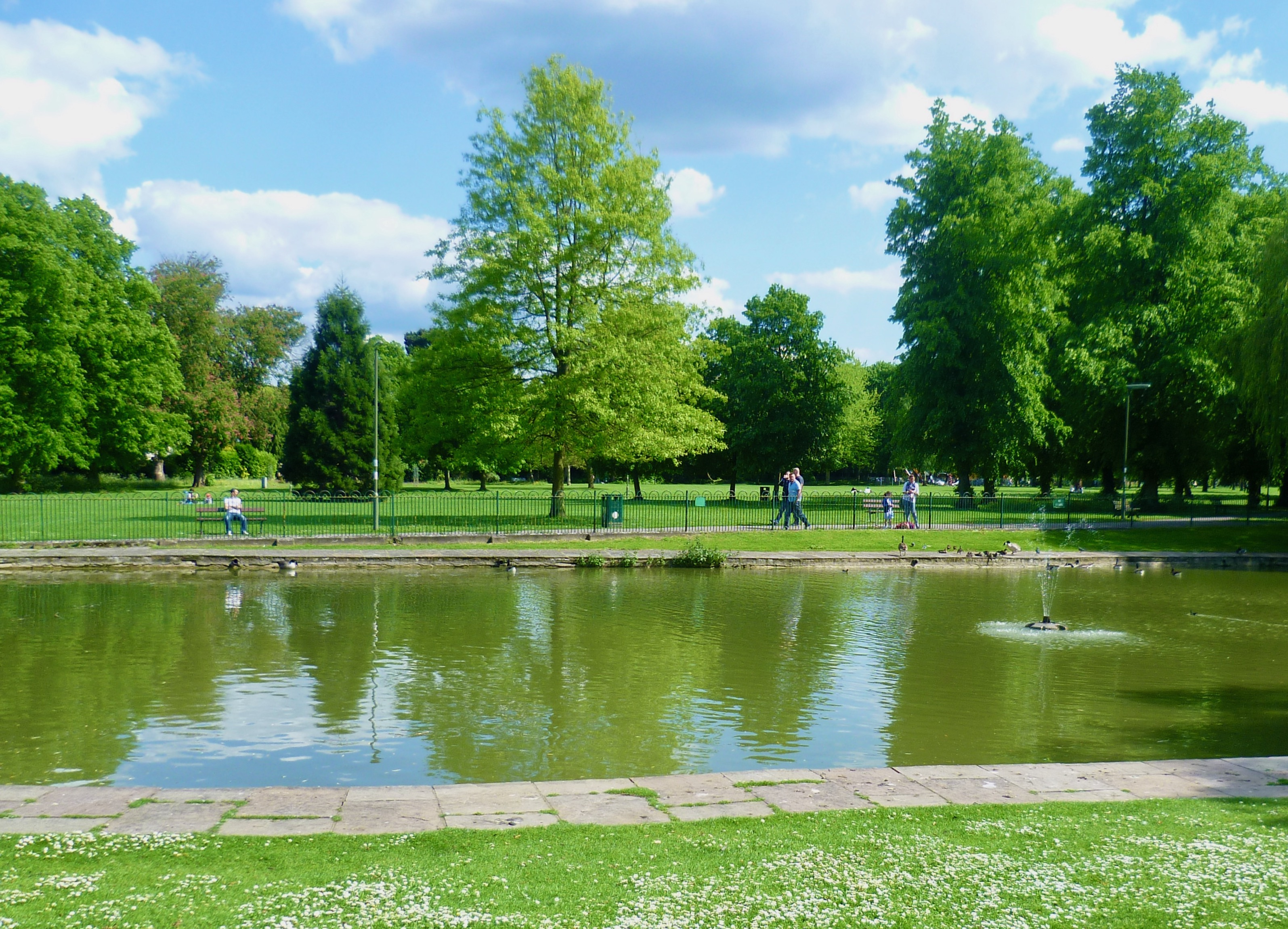
The lake in Rosebery Park

Rosebery Park, to the south of the town centre, was presented to Epsom UDC in 1913 by Lord Rosebery as "proof of [his] deep and abiding affection" for the town. Rosebery's wish was for the creation of "a public pleasure ground for the resort and recreation of the inhabitants of Epsom." Work to create the formal areas of the park had begun by the outbreak of the First World War, including the enlargement of an existing pond to create the lake. Non-landscaped areas were converted into allotments during the two world wars. Today the 4.5-hectare (11-acre) park is owned and managed by the Borough Council.

=== Recreation grounds ===
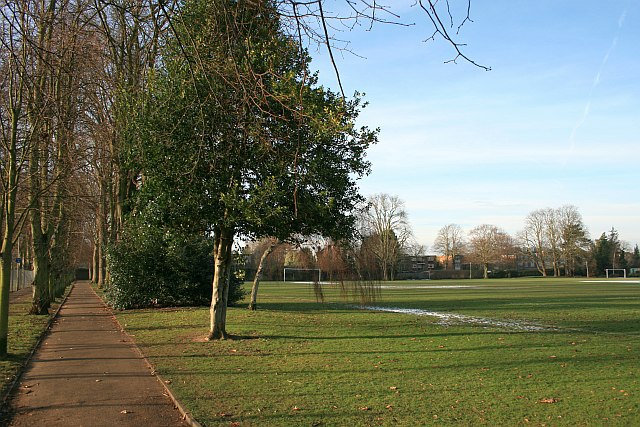
Alexandra Recreation Ground

Alexandra Recreation Ground was opened in 1901 on land previously owned by Chertsey Abbey. The land was purchased by Epsom UDC in response to a public petition and was intended for local residents to use for sporting activities. During WWI, the football pitches were ploughed and the land was used to grow potatoes. An adjacent chalk pit was filled in 1933 and is now the site of the children's playground.

The Court Recreation Ground, to the north of the town centre, is the largest recreation ground in the borough. The land was acquired between 1924 and 1926 and a bowling green was created in 1934. The ground has an artificial turf sports pitch, five football pitches and three tennis courts.

== Notable residents ==
- Sally Mapp (c. 1706–1737) bonesetter
- John Parkhurst (1728–1797) academic, clergyman and lexicographer – lived in Epsom and is commemorated in a memorial by John Flaxman in St Martin's Church.
- Jonathan Boucher (1738–1804) clergyman, teacher, philologist – was vicar of Epsom from 1784 until his death.
- Isabella Beeton (1836–1865) (Mrs Beeton) journalist, editor, writer - lived in Epsom for much of her childhood.
- Archibald Primrose, 5th Earl of Rosebery (1847–1929) Prime Minister and Liberal Party MP – lived at The Durdans to the south of the town.
- General Sir Charles Grant (1877–1950), senior military officer, son-in-law of Lord Rosebery – died at The Durdans.
- James Chuter Ede (1882–1965) Home Secretary and Labour Party MP – was the first mayor of the Borough of Epsom and Ewell.
- Norman Wisdom (1915–2010) actor, comedian, singer-songwriter
- Frank Hampson (1918–1985) cartoonist and illustrator – worked at studios in College Road.
- John Challis (1942–2021) actor, most famous for portraying Terrance Aubrey "Boycie" Boyce in the long-running BBC Television sitcom Only Fools and Horses, was raised in Epsom.
- Jimmy Page (b. 1944) musician and record producer – spent his formative years at Epsom, where he learned to play the guitar.
- Dame Cheryl Gillan (1952–2021), Conservative politician, Secretary of State for Wales 2010–2012, lived in Epsom shortly before her death.
- Jimmy White (b. 1962) snooker player
- Warwick Davis (b. 1970) actor, comedian – born in Epsom and attended Laine Theatre Arts
- Andrew Garfield (b. 1983) actor
- Joe Wicks (b. 1985) fitness coach, TV presenter, social media personality and author – born and educated in Epsom.
- Lexi Potter (b. 2006) footballer

== See also ==
- Epsom salt
- Grade II* listed buildings in Epsom and Ewell
- List of public art in Surrey

== Bibliography ==
- Abdy, Charles (2001). Epsom Past. Bognor Regis: Phillimore. ISBN 978-18-6-077180-4.
- Aubrey, John (1718). The natural history and antiquities of the county of Surrey: Begun in the year 1673, and continued to the present time. Vol. 2. London: E. Curll.
- Berry, Patricia, ed. (1992). Around Epsom in old photographs. Stroud: Alan Sutton Publishing Ltd. ISBN 0-7509-0122-5.
- Brannan, Laurie, ed. (2004). The Vodafone Book of Derby Quotations. Crowthorne: Sportsguide Press. ISBN 0-954-47102-4.
- Carre, A (2003). Epsom Catholic Churches Past and Present in Pictures. Epsom: John St Joseph's Church.
- Cary, Phyllis; Cary, Winifred (1988). Into the fourth century: History of Epsom United Reformed Church. Epsom: Epsom.
- Cockman, George; Marshall, John, eds. (1988). Old views of Epsom town. Steyning: West Printing.
- Crocker, Glenys (1999). Surrey's Industrial Past (PDF). Guildford: Surrey Industrial History Group. ISBN 978-0-95-239188-3. Archived (PDF) from the original on 9 August 2020.
- Crook, Paul (2000). Surrey Home Guard. Midhurst: Middleton Press. ISBN 1-901-70657-5.
- Essen, R.I. (1991). Epsom's Military Camp. Epsom: Pullingers Ltd. ISBN 0-902424-05-X.
- Essen, R.I. (1992). Thirties Epsom. Epsom: Pullingers Ltd. ISBN 0-902-42406-8.
- Fiennes, Celia (1888). Through England on a Side Saddle in the Time of William and Mary. London: Leadenhall Press.
- Fisher, Lucy (2018). Emily Wilding Davison: The Martyr Suffragette. London: Biteback Publishing. ISBN 978-1-78-590413-4.
- Freeman, Sarah (1977). Isabella and Sam: The Story of Mrs. Beeton. London: Victor Gollancz Ltd. ISBN 978-0-575-01835-8.
- Gover, J.E.B; Mawer, A.; Stenton, F.M. (1969). The place-names of Surrey. Cambridge: Cambridge University Press.
- Harte, Jeremy (2005). Epsom: A History and Celebration. Salisbury: Francis Frith. ISBN 1-845-89201-1.
- Harte, Jeremy (2017). Epsom & Ewell at work. Stroud: Amberley Publishing. ISBN 978-1-4456-7258-8.
- Home, Gordon (1901). Epsom: Its history and surroundings. Epsom: S.R. Publishers Ltd.
- Hughes, Kathryn (2006). The Short Life and Long Times of Mrs Beeton. London: HarperCollins Publishers. ISBN 978-0-7524-6122-9. Archived from the original on 3 November 2020.
- Hunn, David (1973). Epsom Racecourse. London: Davis-Poynter Ltd. ISBN 0-706-70099-6.
- Kümin, Beat A (1996). The shaping of a community : the rise and reformation of the English parish, c. 1400-1560. Aldershot: Scholar. ISBN 978-1-85-928164-2.
- Lambert, Richard (2007). Two legs not four. Taunton: Tony Williams Publications Ltd. ISBN 978-1-869833-58-9.
- Latham, Robert; Matthews, William, eds. (1971a). The Diary of Samuel Pepys. Vol. 4. London: Harper Collins. doi:10.1093/actrade/9780004990248.book.1. ISBN 978-0-00-499024-8.
- Latham, Robert; Matthews, William, eds. (1971b). The Diary of Samuel Pepys. Vol. 8. London: Harper Collins. doi:10.1093/actrade/9780004990286.book.1. ISBN 978-0-00-499028-6.
- Malden, H.E., ed. (1911). A History of the County of Surrey. Vol. 3. London: Victoria County History. Archived from the original on 28 January 2021.
- McInally, Mary (1998). A history of the parish of St Joseph, Epsom. Ewell: Bourne Hall Museum.
- Morley, Ann; Stanley, Liz (1988). The Life and Death of Emily Wilding Davison. London: The Women's Press. ISBN 978-0-7043-4133-3.
- Orr, Bridget (2020). British Enlightenment Theatre: Dramatizing Difference. Cambridge: Cambridge University Press. ISBN 978-1-10-849971-2.
- Osbourne, Bruce; Weaver, Cora (1996). Rediscovering 17th century springs and spas. Malvern: Aldine Press.
- Scadding, Alan (2004). Benevolence and excellence: 150 years of The Royal Medical Foundation of Epsom College. Epsom: Epsom College.
- Shortland, Edward (1998). The murder of Station Sergeant Thomas Green at Epsom Police Station 17 June 1919. Chessington: Actel.
- Stuttard, J.C., ed. (1995). A History of Ashtead. Leatherhead: Leatherhead & District Local History Society. ISBN 978-0-95-060092-5.
- Swete, C.J. (1860). A handbook of Epsom. Epsom: J.N. Collingwood.
- Tanner, Michael (2013). The Suffragette Derby. London: The Robson Press. ISBN 978-1-8495-4518-1.
- Van Lennep, William, ed. (1965). The London Stage, 1660-1800: Volume One, 1660-1700. Southern Illinois University Press. ISBN 978-0-80-930171-3.
- Vardey, Edwina, ed. (1988). History of Leatherhead: a town at the crossroads. Leatherhead: Leatherhead & District Local History Society. ISBN 978-0-95-060091-8.
- Wakefield, Peter (1997). Industrial History of Epsom and Ewell. Guildford: Surrey Industrial History Group. ISBN 0-952-39185-6.
- White, Reginald (1928). Ancient Epsom: The common fields and ancient roads. Sutton: W. Pile.
- White, Trevor; Harte, Jeremy (1992). Epsom, a pictorial history. Bognor Regis: Phillimore. ISBN 978-08-5-033841-6.
