= Commissioners in Lunacy =

Public body established by the Lunacy Act 1845

The Commissioners in Lunacy, alternatively the Lunacy Commission, was a public body which was established by the Lunacy Act 1845 to oversee asylums and the welfare of mentally ill people in England and Wales. Its origin comprises the County Asylums Act 1808 (48 Geo. 3. c. 96), which was alternatively called the 'Lunatic Paupers' or the 'Criminals Act 1808' or, after its promoter Charles Williams-Wynn (1775–1850), 'Wynn's Act'. This Act was replaced by the County Lunatic Asylums (England) Act 1828, informally the Madhouse Act 1828, which introduced the 'Metropolitan Commissioners in Lunacy'. By 1842 the scope of the 'Metropolitan Commissioners in Lunacy' had been enlarged from London to cover the whole country. And the jurisdiction of the Lord Chancellor over lunatics, so found by writ of De Lunatico Inquirendo, had been delegated to two Masters-in-Chancery. The 'Lunacy Act 1842' (5 & 6 Vict. c. 64) established the 'Commissioners in Lunacy', and was repealed by the Lunacy Act 1845, by which the Commissioners were retitled 'Masters in Lunacy'.

== The structure of the Lunacy Commission ==
The Lunacy Commission comprised eleven Metropolitan Commissioners: five lay, three medical and three legal, and constituted 'a permanent inspectorate for all asylums and houses licensed for the care of the insane in the country (with the single exception of Bethlem Hospital in London).' The five lay members were all honorary and solely had to attend board meetings. However, the medical members and the legal members and its Secretary were full-time and salaried. The Commissioners were required to 'visit gaols, workhouses and other institutions where the mentally afflicted might be found and, in the case of the workhouses they were to report their findings to the Poor Law commissioners and to the Lord Chancellor.'

The first Chairman of the Commissioners was Lord Shaftesbury, who remained in post until he died in 1885. The first Secretary was Robert Wilfred Skeffington Lutwidge, a barrister and uncle of Lewis Carroll. He had previously been one of the 'Metropolitan Commissioners', and later become an 'Inspector' of the Commission. In the order of precedence, the post of 'Master in Lunacy' ranked next after that of a Master in Chancery.

== The asylums which were commissioned ==
The following asylums were commissioned under the auspices of the 'Commissioners in Lunacy' (or their predecessors).

English county asylums

- First Bedford County Asylum (Bedford), 1812
- Second Bedfordshire County Asylum (Fairfield), 1860
- Berkshire County Asylum (Moulsford), 1870
- Buckinghamshire County Asylum (Stone), 1853
- Cambridgeshire County Asylum (Fulbourn), 1858
- First Cheshire County Asylum (Chester), 1829
- Second Cheshire County Asylum (Macclesfield), 1871
- Cornwall County Asylum (Bodmin), 1818
- Cumberland and Westmorland County Asylum (Carleton), 1862
- Derbyshire County Asylum (Mickleover), 1851
- Devon County Asylum (Exminster), 1845
- Dorset County Asylum (Charminster), 1863
- Durham County Asylum (Sedgefield), 1858
- East Riding County Asylum (Walkington), 1871
- East Sussex County Asylum (Hellingly), 1898
- First Essex County Asylum (Brentwood), 1853
- Second Essex County Asylum (Colchester), 1913
- First Gloucestershire County Asylum (Gloucester), 1823
- Second Gloucestershire County Asylum (Gloucester), 1883
- First Hampshire County Asylum (Knowle), 1852
- Second Hampshire County Asylum (Basingstoke), 1917
- Herefordshire County Asylum (Burghill), 1868
- Hertfordshire County Asylum (St Albans), 1899
- Isle of Wight County Asylum (Gatcombe), 1896
- First Kent County Asylum (Barming Heath), 1833
- Second Kent County Asylum (Chartham), 1875
- Kesteven County Asylum (Quarrington, 1897
- First Lancashire County Asylum (Lancaster), 1816
- Second Lancashire County Asylum (Prestwich), 1851
- Third Lancashire County Asylum (Rainhill), 1851
- Fourth Lancashire County Asylum (Whittingham), 1873
- Fifth Lancashire County Asylum (Winwick), 1897
- Sixth Lancashire County Asylum (Whalley), 1915
- Leicestershire County Asylum (Leicester), 1837
- Lincolnshire County Asylum (Bracebridge Heath), 1852
- First London County Asylum (Hanwell), 1831
- Second London County Asylum (Colney Hatch), 1849
- Third London County Asylum (Belmont), 1877
- Fourth London County Asylum (Coulsdon), 1882
- Fifth London County Asylum (Woodford Bridge), 1893
- Sixth London County Asylum (Epsom), 1899
- Seventh London County Asylum (Dartford Heath), 1898
- Eighth London County Asylum (Epsom), 1902
- Ninth London County Asylum (Epsom), 1904
- Tenth London County Asylum (Epsom), 1907
- Eleventh London County Asylum (Epsom), 1921
- Norfolk County Asylum (Norwich), 1814
- Northamptonshire County Asylum (Duston), 1876
- Northumberland County Asylum (Morpeth), 1859
- North Riding County Asylum (Clifton), 1847
- First Nottinghamshire County Asylum (Sneinton), 1812
- Second Nottinghamshire County Asylum (Radcliffe-on-Trent), 1902
- Oxfordshire County Asylum (Littlemore), 1846
- Shropshire County Asylum (Shelton), 1845
- First Somerset County Asylum (Horrington), 1848
- Second Somerset County Asylum (Norton Fitzwarren), 1897
- First Staffordshire County Asylum (Stafford), 1818
- Second Staffordshire County Asylum (Cheddleton), 1892
- Suffolk County Asylum (Melton), 1827
- First Surrey County Asylum (Tooting), 1840
- Second Surrey County Asylum (Woking), 1867
- Third Surrey County Asylum (Hooley), 1905
- Sussex County Asylum (Haywards Heath), 1859
- Warwickshire County Asylum (Hatton), 1852
- First West Riding County Asylum (Wakefield), 1818
- Second West Riding County Asylum (Middlewood), 1872
- Third West Riding County Asylum (Menston), 1885
- Fourth West Riding County Asylum (Storthes Hall), 1904
- Fifth West Riding County Asylum (Burley in Wharfedale), 1902
- West Sussex County Asylum (Chichester), 1894
- Wiltshire County Asylum (Devizes), 1849
- First Worcestershire County Asylum (Powick), 1847
- Second Worcestershire County Asylum (Bromsgrove), 1907

"New" mental hospitals established later by Middlesex County Council

Note: The 'First Surrey County Asylum' at Tooting (see above) was transferred to Middlesex County Council in 1888 and became the 'First Middlesex County Mental Hospital' in the early 20th century

- Second Middlesex County Mental Hospital (London Colney), 1905
- Third Middlesex County Mental Hospital (Shenley), 1934

English borough asylums

- Croydon Borough Asylum, 1903
- First Birmingham City Asylum, 1850
- Second Birmingham City Asylum, 1882
- Third Birmingham City Asylum, 1905
- Bristol City Asylum, 1861
- Canterbury Borough Asylum, 1902
- Derby Borough Asylum, 1888
- East Ham Borough Asylum, 1937
- Exeter City Asylum, 1886
- Gateshead Borough Asylum, 1914
- Ipswich Borough Asylum, 1870
- Kingston upon Hull Borough Asylum, 1883
- Leicester Borough Asylum, 1869
- Lincoln Borough Asylum, 1817
- Middlesbrough Borough Asylum, 1898
- Newcastle upon Tyne Borough Asylum, 1869
- City of London Asylum, 1866
- Norwich Borough Asylum, 1828
- Nottingham Borough Asylum, 1880
- Plymouth Borough Asylum, 1891
- Portsmouth Borough Asylum, 1879
- Sunderland Borough Asylum, 1895
- West Ham Borough Asylum, 1901
- York Borough Asylum, 1906

Metropolitan Asylums Board asylums (established for chronic cases)

- Caterham Asylum, 1870
- Darenth Asylum, 1878
- Leavesden Asylum, 1870
- Tooting Bec Asylum, 1903

Welsh county asylums

- Brecon and Radnor County Asylum (Talgarth), 1903
- Carmarthenshire, Cardigan and Pembrokeshire County Asylum (Carmarthen), 1865
- Denbighshire County Asylum (Denbigh), 1844
- First Glamorgan County Asylum (Pen-y-fai), 1864
- Second Glamorgan County Asylum (Bridgend), 1886
- Monmouthshire County Asylum (Abergavenny), 1851

Welsh borough asylums

- Cardiff City Asylum, 1908
- Newport Borough Asylum, 1906
- Swansea Borough Mental Hospital, 1932

== The Commissioners ==
Incomplete list:

- Thomas Turner, Medical (1845–1854)
- Henry Herbert Southey, Medical (1845–1848)
- Bryan Procter, Legal (1845–1860)
- Anthony Ashley-Cooper, 7th Earl of Shaftesbury, Lay, chair (1845–1885)
- Robert Vernon, 1st Baron Lyveden, Lay (1845–1860)
- Edward Seymour, 12th Duke of Somerset, Lay (1845–1852)
- Robert Gordon, Lay (1845)
- Francis Barlow, Lay (1845)
- J. R. Southey, Medical (1845)
- James Cowles Prichard (1845–1848), Medical, in place of Southey who resigned
- James Mylne, Legal (1845)
- John Hancock Hall (1845)
- Robert Wilfred Skeffington Lutwidge (appointed 1855)
- John Davies Cleaton
- Harry Davenport (appointed 1889)
- Edward Nugent, Earl of Milltown (appointed 1889)
- Henry Morgan-Clifford
- Sir Marriott Cooke (1898–1914)

== The replacement of the Commission ==
The Mental Deficiency Act 1913 replaced the Commission with the Board of Control for Lunacy and Mental Deficiency.

== See also ==
- Court of Protection
- Alleged Lunatics' Friend Society
- Psychiatric survivors movement
- Commissioners in Lunacy for Scotland
- Commissioners in Lunacy for Ireland
