= George Thomas Hine =

English architect

George Thomas Hine FRIBA (1842–25 April 1916) was an English architect. His prolific output included new county asylums for Hertfordshire, Lincolnshire, Surrey, East Sussex and Worcestershire, as well as extensive additions to many others.

== Biography ==
Son of Thomas Chambers Hine of Nottingham, with whom he studied from 1858, and was in partnership from 1867 to 1891. He married in 1870 and had two children, Dr. Thomas Guy Macaulay Hine, and Muriel Hine the novelist.

Hine specialised in asylum architecture, and his paper to the RIBA in 1901 still provides a valuable review of asylum design and planning. In 1887, after winning the competition for the enormous new LCC (London County Council) asylum at Claybury, Essex, he established his practice in London. This was strengthened by his experience as Consulting Architect to the Commissioners in Lunacy, a post which he held from 1897, succeeding Charles Henry Howell. He was a frequent entrant for asylum competitions, winning his first, for Nottingham Asylum, in 1875. He competed in ten asylum competitions during the 1880s and 1890s, winning five of them, and served as assessor for four more. He designed and saw completed four major LCC asylums housing over 2,000 patients each (Claybury, Bexley, Horton and Long Grove), and his prolific output included new county asylums for Hertfordshire, Lincolnshire, Surrey, East Sussex and Worcestershire, as well as extensive additions to many others.

== Architectural style ==
Hine's asylum designs had several distinguishing features that can be used to identify any of his many projects. All were built in red brick and had grey stonework. His later designs often feature a polychrome white/red brick pattern, especially for window mullions, although this was a relatively common architectural detail at the time and not exclusive to Hine. Hine was an early exponent of the 'echelon' design of asylums which he deployed at Claybury.

== Works ==
Works included:

- Nottingham Borough Asylum, Mapperley, 1875–80; extended 1889–90
- The Towers Hospital, Leicester, extensions 1883–90
- 4th Middlesex County Asylum, Claybury, 1887–93
- 2nd Dorset County Asylum, Herrison extensions, 1890
- Sunderland Borough Asylum, Cherry Knowle, 1891–95
- 3rd Middlesex County Asylum, Banstead, additions, 1893
- Isle of Wight County Asylum, Whitecroft completion, 1893
- Kesteven County Asylum, Rauceby, 1897-1902
- London County Asylum, Bexley, 1898
- Berkshire County Asylum, Fairmile extensions, 1898
- Hertfordshire County Asylum, Hill End, 1900
- Belfast Asylum for the Lunatic Poor, Purdysburn, 1900
- London County Asylum, Horton, 1901–02
- Cuckfield Isolation Hospital, Sussex 1902
- East Sussex County Asylum, Hellingly, 1901–03
- 2nd Worcestershire County Asylum, Barnsley Hall, 1901–07
- Surrey County Asylum, Netherne, 1901–09
- London County Asylum, Long Grove, 1903–07
- 2nd Hampshire County Asylum, Park Prewett, 1912
- Gateshead Borough Asylum, St. Mary's, 1910-14
