= Lutwidge =

Lutwidge is a surname. Notable people with the surname include:

- Robert Wilfred Skeffington Lutwidge (1802–1873), English barrister and early photographer
- Skeffington Lutwidge (1737–1814), Royal Navy officer
- Charles Lutwidge Dodgson, English mathematician, logician, clergyman, photographer and author, better known by his pen name of Lewis Carroll
