= Llanbedr (disambiguation) =

Llanbedr is a village in Gwynedd, northwest Wales.

Llanbedr may also refer to other Welsh settlements:

== North Wales ==
- Llanbedr-y-Cennin, Caerhun, Conwy valley
- Llanbedr Dyffryn Clwyd, near Ruthin, Denbighshire

== South Wales ==
- Llanbedr Painscastle, a settlement in Powys
- Llanbedr, Vale of Grwyney, near Crickhowell, Powys
- Llanbedr, Newport, a hamlet in Langstone
- Lampeter (Welsh: Llanbedr Pont Steffan), Ceredigion

== See also ==
- Llanbedr Airport, Gwynedd
