= HM Prison Parc =

Men's prison in Bridgend, Wales

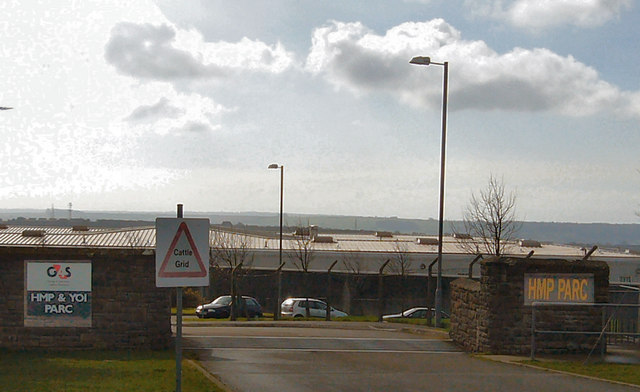
- Interactive map of HM Prison Parc
- Location: Bridgend, Mid Glamorgan; 51°31′51″N 3°33′39″W
- Status: Operational
- Security class: Category B Adult Males/Young Offenders/Juveniles
- Capacity: 1652 (June 2016)
- Opened: 1997
- Managed by: G4S
- Director: Will Styles

HM Prison Parc (Welsh: Carchar Parc EF) is a Category B men's private prison and Young Offenders Institution in Bridgend, Mid Glamorgan, Wales. It is operated by G4S, and is the only privately operated prison in Wales.

== History ==
The site was previously occupied by Parc Hospital, a psychiatric hospital. Parc Prison was developed via a Private Finance Initiative contract in January 1996 and built by Costain Group at a cost of £82 million, opening in November 1997. Alongside HMP Altcourse, Parc was one of the first UK prisons to be financed, designed and owned by the private sector. When it first opened, Parc Prison had around 800 prisoners, accommodated in two-bed cells across four blocks.

From its opening, Parc Prison was beset with problems. Failures in the security technology, anti-English racism from Welsh inmates, and a high number of suicides were highlighted as concerns by Her Majesty's Chief Inspector of Prisons in a 1999 report. However, in March 2001, a report from the Chief Inspector noted a major improvement.

In August 2004, an Independent Monitoring Board report stated that Parc Prison was the worst-performing of all ten privately run prisons in Wales and England. The report criticised the lack of separate healthcare facilities for juveniles, the inadequate level of dental provision, and poor staff morale.

In January 2013, the Ministry of Justice announced that an additional houseblock would be constructed.

In 2024, the governance of the prison came under scrutiny again following a series of deaths in a short period of time. Ten inmates died within 3 months, prompting protests outside the prison and calls for the government to take over the running of Parc from G4S.

In 2025, leaked social media messages revealed that staff at HMP Parc had made inappropriate comments about inmates, including jokes about self-harm and violent incidents. One message stated that prisoners should be "broken mentally and physically." The revelations came amid reports of 17 inmate deaths at the prison that year—the highest in the UK. Multiple staff members were arrested on suspicion of assault and misconduct, with further arrests in early 2025. G4S, which operates the prison, stated it had dismissed three individuals, suspended another, and maintained a zero tolerance approach to misconduct as investigations by South Wales Police and the prison service's corruption unit continue.

== Current state ==
Parc has 23 wings consisting of 21 adult and 2 YPU wings, holding Remand and Sentenced Category B Adult males, juveniles and young offenders. Accommodation is a mix of single and double cells. All cells are equipped with sanitation, natural and forced ventilation, and electrics. All wings are equipped with hot-water boilers, PIN telephones, pool and table tennis tables, showers, laundry facilities, and association areas. Other facilities at the prison include a library, gym, fitness room, and a multi-faith chaplaincy. The prison's visits hall has a canteen and crèche.

Education is provided by an in-house education department. A range of subjects are offered including English, maths, information technology, art, music, hospitality, languages and a range of vocational qualifications. Qualifications up to and including Open University courses are available. The prison's industries complex comprises nine workshops including carpentry, metalwork, graphic design and print, and industrial cleaning. All other workshops are dedicated to manufacturing contracts with local companies.

== Notable inmates ==
- Mark Aizlewood
- Ian Watkins (while on remand)
