= Charlton Down =

Village in Dorset, England

Coordinates: 50.7522°N 2.4563°W

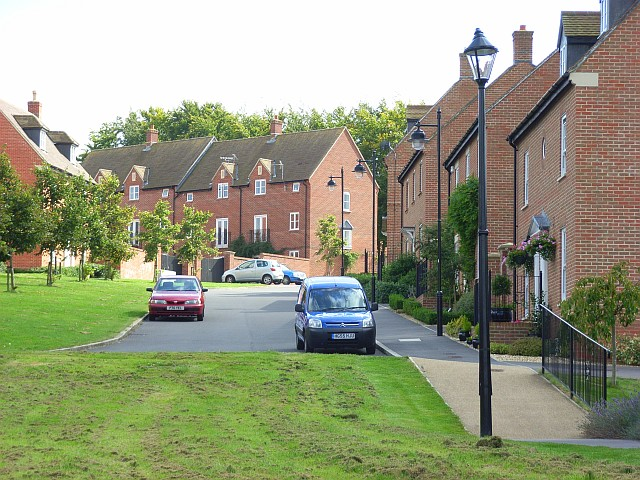
- Charlton Down

- Location within Dorset
- Population: 1,459
- OS grid reference: SY679948
- Civil parish: Charminster
- Unitary authority: Dorset
- Ceremonial county: Dorset
- Region: South West
- Country: England
- Sovereign state: United Kingdom
- Postcode district: DT
- Dialling code: 01305
- Police: Dorset
- Fire: Dorset and Wiltshire
- Ambulance: South Western
- UK Parliament: West Dorset

Charlton Down is a new village in Dorset, England, situated approximately 4 miles (6.4 km) north of the county town Dorchester. It lies within the civil parish of Charminster.

== History ==
The village of Charlton Down developed from the site of the old Dorset County Asylum. In 1920 it became the Dorset County Mental Hospital, and in 1940 was renamed Herrison Hospital. The hospital closed in 1992 and three of the larger buildings — Redwood (built in 1863), Greenwood (1896) and Herrison House (1904) — have been converted into apartments.

== Facilities ==
Cottage style terrace houses, semi-detached and detached 3, 4, and 5 bed roomed house with all modern services fill the old site. The original cricket ground has a new pavilion and there is a thriving cricket club in the summer with one large and one small park serving to the village the village has a shop which contains a post office and a cash dispensary. It is one of the few in the area without a church or pub. The village hall is used regularly for various social events.

== Toponymy ==
After the closure of Herrison Hospital in 1991 the area became known as charlton down. The new name of Charlton Down was chosen to honour a medieval epithet for the hill on which it was built.
