= Llanbedr Dyffryn Clwyd =

Village in Denbighshire, Wales

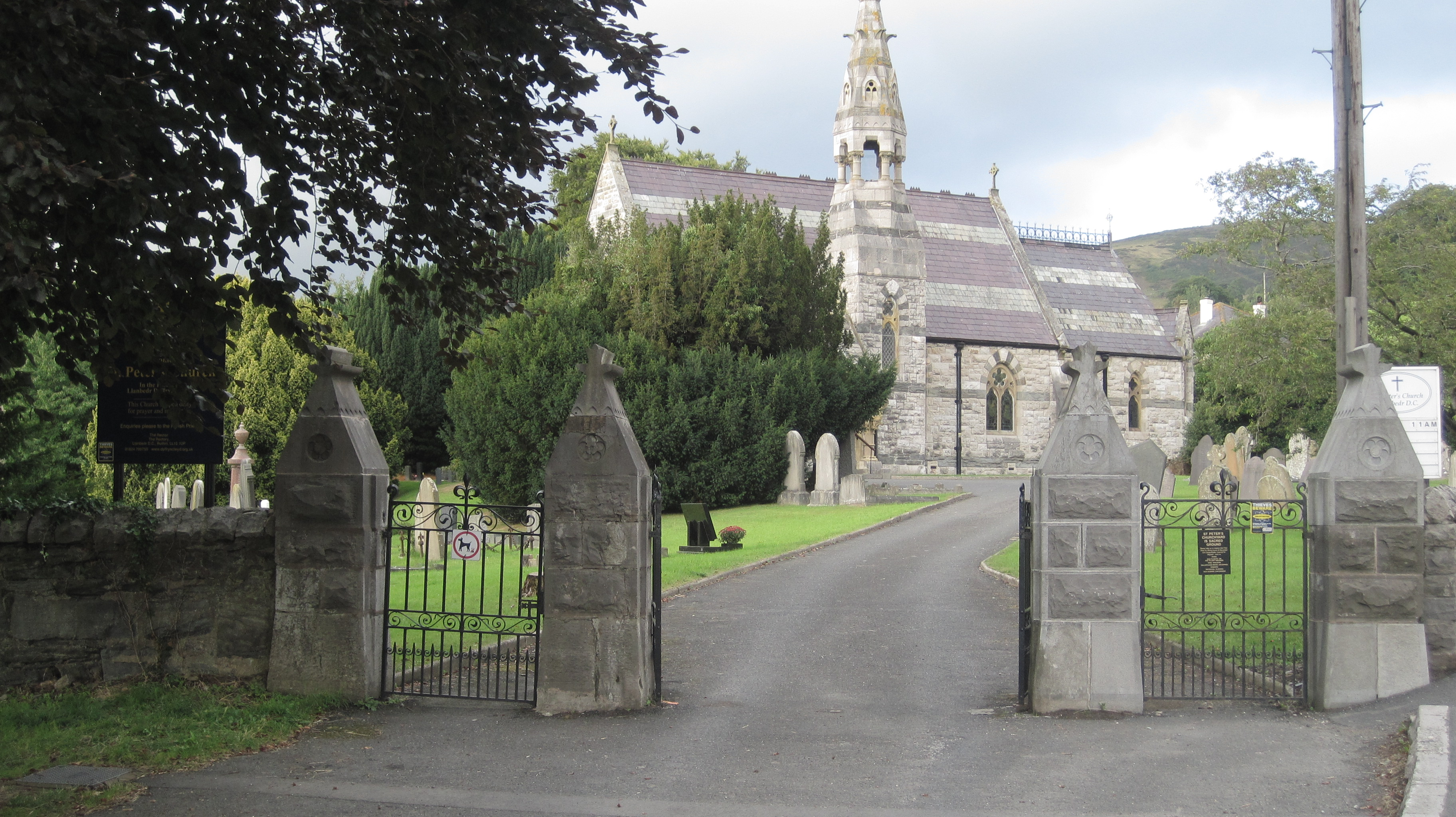
- St Peter's Church, Llanbedr Dyffryn Clwyd

- Location within Denbighshire
- Population: 787 (2011)
- OS grid reference: SJ145595
- Community: Llanbedr Dyffryn Clwyd
- Principal area: Denbighshire
- Preserved county: Clwyd
- Country: Wales
- Sovereign state: United Kingdom
- Post town: RUTHIN
- Postcode district: LL15
- Dialling code: 01824
- Police: North Wales
- Fire: North Wales
- Ambulance: Welsh
- UK Parliament: Clwyd East
- Senedd Cymru – Welsh Parliament: Clwyd West
- Website: http://www.llanbedrdyffrynclwyd.org.uk/
- List of places UK Wales Denbighshire 53.124°N 3.280°W Map of the community

Llanbedr Dyffryn Clwyd is a small village and community in Denbighshire in Wales, approximately 2 miles north-east of the town of Ruthin on the main A494 road towards Chester.

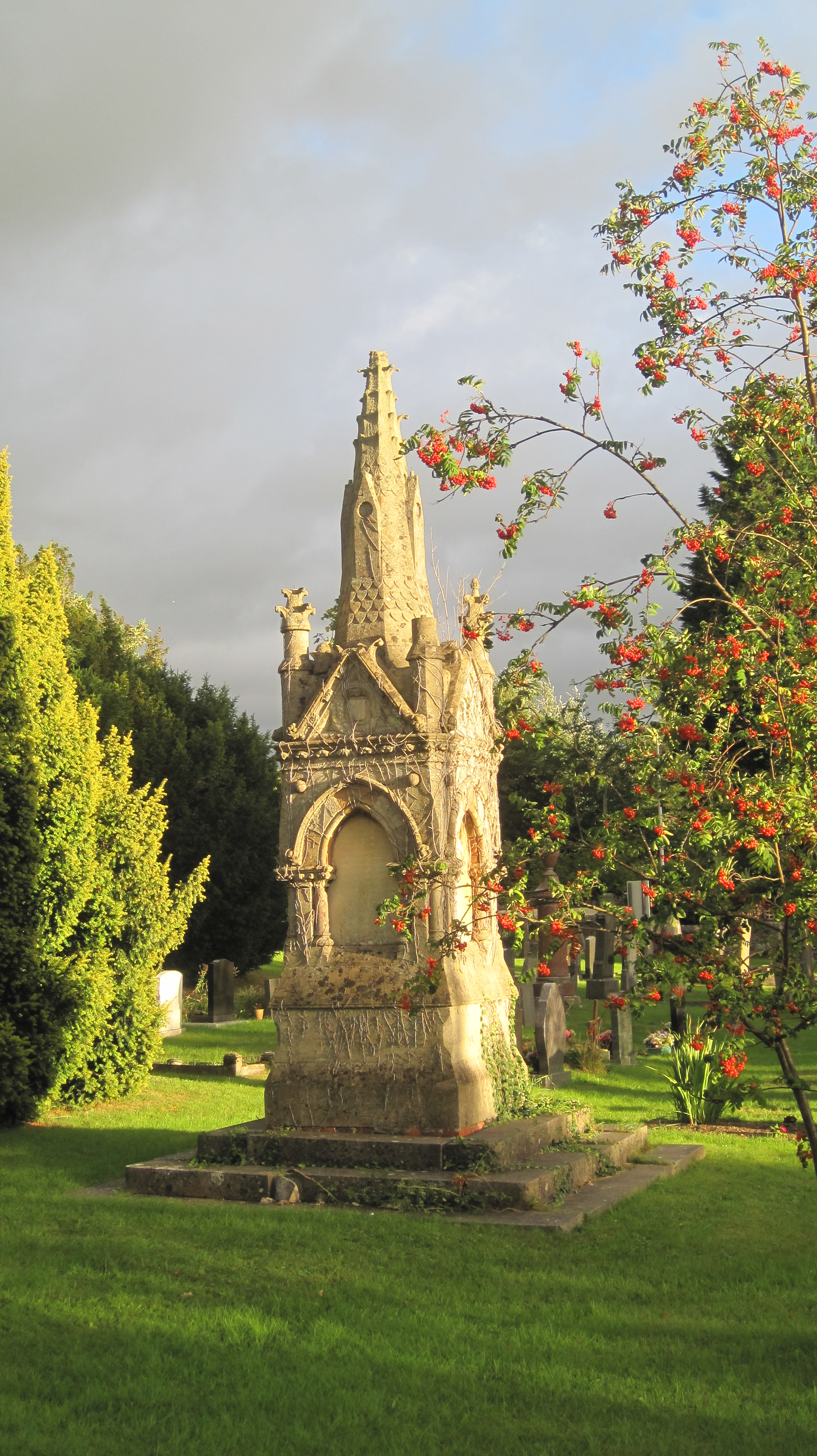
St Peter's Church, memorial

There are several places called Llanbedr in Wales, as the word literally translates to 'church of St. Peter' in English. There are two churches called St Peter's in Llanbedr D.C. (as it is sometimes abbreviated to), the original medieval church of St. Peter and still stands as a Grade II listed ruin near Llanbedr Hall, and the present parish church of St. Peter, also Grade II listed, is alongside the A494 dedicated in 1864, part of the Deanery of Dyffryn Clwyd in the Diocese of St. Asaph.

In 1831 the parish had a population of 527, a number which fell to 285 by the time of the 1901 census. In the 2011 census the population of Llanbedr was 787.

== Notable residents ==
- Eifion Lewis-Roberts
- Joseph Ablett

== Governance ==
Llanbedr Dyffryn Clwyd is part of the electoral ward called Llanbedr Dyffryn Clwyd/Llangynhafal. This ward had a total population in the 2011 census of 1,421.
