= Richard Rougier =

Sir Richard George Rougier (12 February 1932 – 25 October 2007) was a judge of the High Court of England and Wales for 15 years. He was the son of the famous historical romance novelist Georgette Heyer.

== Early years ==
Rougier was the only child of novelist Georgette Heyer and her husband, George Ronald Rougier CBE QC, a mining engineer who later became a barrister. His mother, a successful published author by the time of his birth, referred to Rougier as her "most notable (indeed peerless) work." In 1939, his father was called to the Bar, and the family moved first to Brighton, then to Hove, so that Ronald Rougier could easily commute to London. The following year, Rougier was sent to prep school. The Blitz made train travel uncertain at times, making it difficult for Rougier's father to commute. In 1942, the family moved to London.

He was educated at Marlborough College, and read classics and law at Pembroke College, Cambridge from 1952 to 1955. He did National Service in the Rifle Brigade.

== Career ==
He followed his father into the law, and was called to the Bar at Inner Temple in 1956. He practised as a barrister on the South Eastern Circuit, specialising in medical insurance and pharmaceutical cases. He became a QC in 1972 and a recorder in 1973.

He was appointed as a High Court judge in 1986, in the Queen's Bench Division, receiving the customary knighthood. He was the presiding judge of the Midland circuit from 1990 to 1994. He sat in a number of controversial cases.

He presided at the trial of Iorworth Hoare in 1989, sentencing him to life imprisonment for the attempted rape of a 60-year-old.

In a civil case in 1991, he ruled that the family of Lynn Siddons, who had been stabbed to death in 1977, was entitled to damages from her suspected murderer Michael Brookes. Although Brookes had not been tried in a criminal court, Rougier ruled that it was beyond reasonable doubt that Brookes was her killer. Brookes was later sentenced to life imprisonment in 1996.

He presided at the murder trial of Jonathan Jones, accused of killing Harry and Megan Tooze, the parents of his girlfriend, at their farmhouse in Llanharry in mid-Glamorgan in 1993. Rougier was clearly surprised when Jones was convicted by the jury. Although he sentenced Jones to the mandatory term of life imprisonment, he set no minimum term, and wrote privately to the Home Secretary, Michael Howard, and defence counsel, John Rees QC, to express his doubts over the verdict. Jones was later released and his conviction was quashed in May 1996.

He also sat in the case of Revill v. Newbery in 1994, in which burglar Mark Revill sued pensioner Ted Newbery, the occupant of the shed that Revill was trying to break into. Rougier ordered Newbery to pay Revill £4,000 damages for the injuries he sustained when Newbery fired a shotgun blind, through the shed door.

He retired in 2002, but presided at an inquiry in 2005 into the deaths of 11 men at Kingsway Hospital in Derby. He retired to Somerset, where he enjoyed playing contract bridge, fly fishing and golf. He was also a member of the Garrick Club.

== Family ==
In 1960, Rougier fell in love with the estranged wife of one of his acquaintances. He assisted the woman, Susanna Flint, in leaving her husband, and, after her divorce was final, the couple married. Together they raised her two sons from her first marriage as well as their own son, Nicholas, born in 1966.

They were divorced in 1996, and he remarried later that year, to Judy Williams. He died of lung cancer on 25 October 2007 aged 75.
