= Joseph Ablett =

British philanthropist

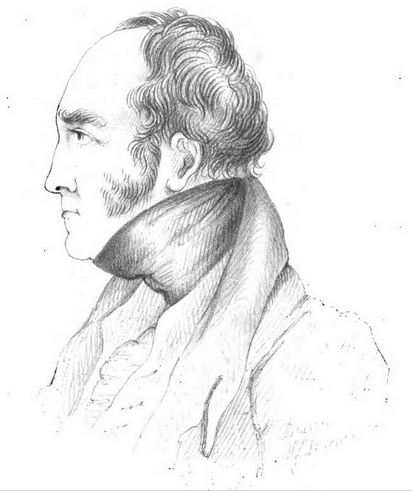
Joseph Ablett, 1773–1848

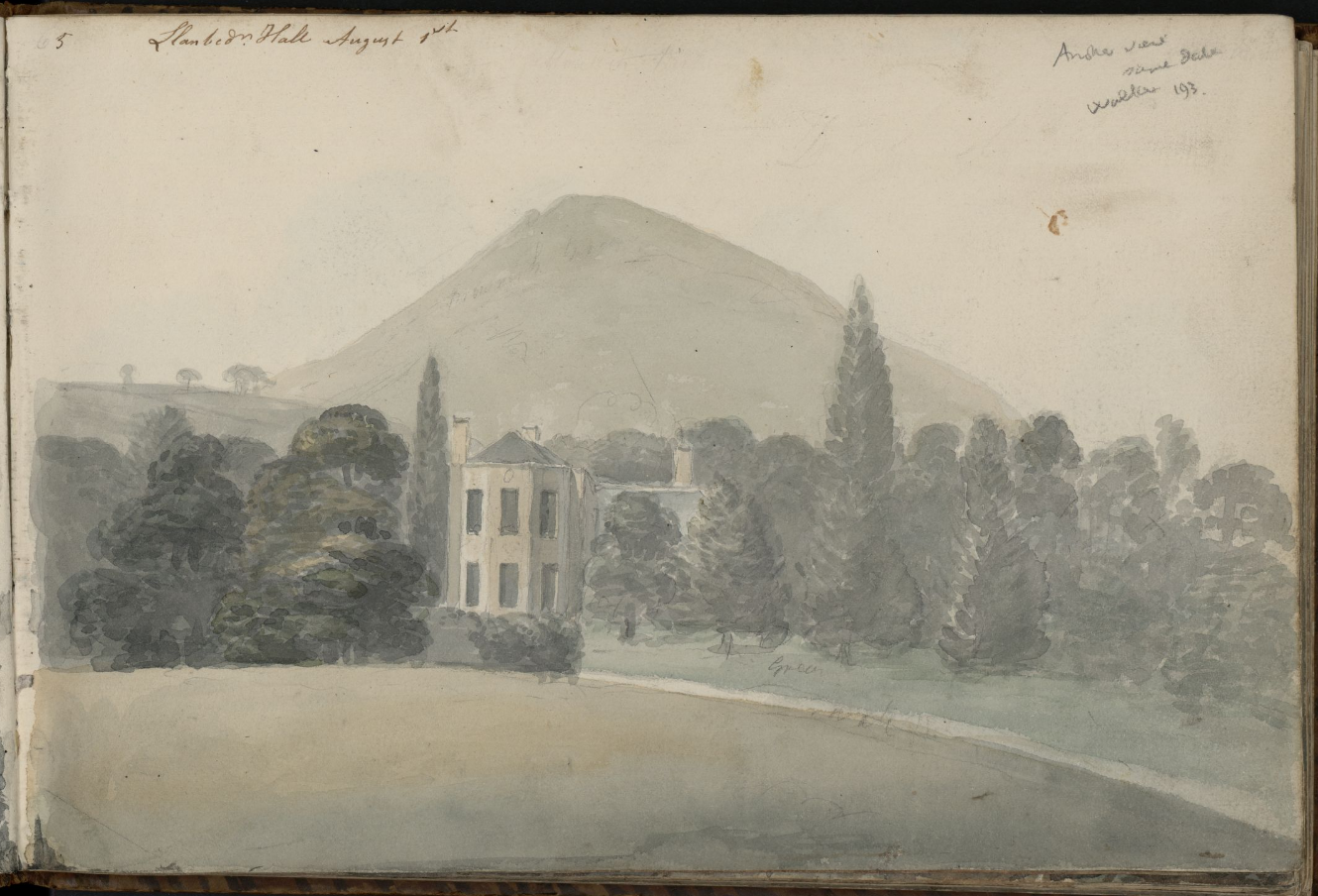
Llanbedr Hall in 1805, the home of Joseph Ablett

Joseph Ablett (29 January 1773 – 9 January 1848) was a philanthropist and High Sheriff of Denbighshire, a county in Wales, in 1809.

== Life ==
Joseph Ablett was born on 29 January 1773. He bore the same name as his father, who was involved in the threadmaking business of Ablett and Jesse in Manchester. He attended Manchester Grammar School from 1783 and in 1804 purchased Llanbedr Hall in Llanbedr-Dyffryn-Clwyd, near Ruthin, from Rev. Edward Thelwall. He became a magistrate for the county of Denbighshire and, in 1809, High Sheriff. His father also acquired an estate near Ruthin, at Ffynogion, giving rise to some confusion in sources regarding which events related to the father and which to the son.

In 1826, Ablett stood for election to the House of Commons as a Whig. He polled the same number of votes - 273 - as Frederick Richard West of Ruthin Castle, who was also contesting the Denbigh Boroughs constituency. West was assigned the seat under the rules governing double returns.

Ablett extended his lands in 1833 with the purchase of Bathafarn Hall, a building in Llanbedr that is now listed. He donated the land at Denbigh upon which North Wales Hospital was constructed between 1844 and 1848 and also constructed almshouses in Llanrhydd Street, Ruthin. His correspondence, some of which survives at Denbighshire Archive Service, included dealings with the antiquary William Owen Pughe and the sculptor John Gibson.

Ablett died on 9 January 1848 (Note: A newspaper report of Ablett's funeral says that his coffin plate bore 7 January at the date of death but this is contradicted by the memorial stone in the church and by an earlier report of his death in the same newspaper.) and was buried at the churchyard in Llanbedr. A monument there describes him as

a pious and just man, of cultivated manners and refined taste, and great benevolence. He went about doing good, offering consolation to the weary, and relieving the sufferings of his fellow men. To want and misery his purse was always open, and he ever strove to keep secret his acts of mercy.

His wife, Ann, died in 1854 at the age of 80. The couple had been childless and Llanbedr Hall passed to John Jesse, a relative who himself became High Sheriff of Denbighshire in 1856.

== Publication ==
In 1837, Ablett edited and privately published a compilation of writings by friends titled Literary Hours.
