= Benjamin Broadbent (builder) =

Benjamin Broadbent Sr. (1813–1862) was a prominent English master builder, stonemason, architect, businessman and civic benefactor. In 1840 in Leicester, he established his firm that would later become a renowned family enterprise, Broadbents Ltd. The firm was first established in partnership as Broadbents & Hawley, a Leicestershire building and masonry firm which specialised in stone and marble masonry, gravestone cutting, ecclesiastical restoration, Gothic Revival design, monumental masonry and architectural carving. The partnership was dissolved in 1854, after which Broadbent carried the business forward independently and later as Broadbent & Son, which serviced builders' merchants and roofing contractors and secured major commissions including Overstone Hall. By 1861 Broadbents' company was regarded "as one of the acknowledged best and most liberal provincial firms."

Broadbent built his home, Victoria House, in 1861 in Humberstone. The large estate included a mansion house, stables, coach house, winery, orchard, conservatories and outbuildings. His first wife was the daughter of a farmer from Dodleston, Cheshire called Anne Wright and they had four children. The eldest, also Benjamin, inherited the family business. His second wife was Mary Geary and they had six children. Three years after his death, Victoria House was purchased by the Leicester Corporation to establish the Leicester Borough Asylum, which became the Towers Hospital.

== Selected works ==
His work includes a marble tablet of commemoration in All Saints Church, Thurcaston. Pevsner attributes Victorian ceilings in Althorp's Billiard Room (formerly the Yellow Drawing Room or Rubens Room) and South Drawing Room to the firm under Benjamin Broadbent Jr.

Broadbent erected a plaque on a gable end next to Leicester's old Bow Bridge in 1856, which remains part of the 17th century legend of the fate of Richard III’s body.

When the old Bow Bridge at Leicester was demolished to make way for a new and more serviceable structure, a very good engraving of it appeared in The Illustrated London News of February 9, 1861. It was an old bridge when King Richard III passed over it en route for Bosworth Field. The article read in part: —

"For many years, there was a spot pointed out by visitors as King Richard’s grave, and an old stone inserted in a neighbouring wall bore testimony to the fact. In the course of events, however, it became necessary to pull down the wall, and build over the spot; and it seemed as if the place of King Richard’s burial would be forgotten altogether, and so it probably would have been but for the enterprise and public spirit of a Leicester townsman, Mr. Benjamin Broadbent, a master builder, and one well known for his many acts of munificence. This gentleman, unwilling that the remains of a King of England should lie without a stone to mark the place, obtained permission of Mr. A Turner, the owner of the estate, and at his own sole cost inserted a massive stone in the building about to be erected recording the event... The visitor to Leicester (thanks to Mr. Broadbent), may still go to the place of King Richard's last interment, and may read there that ‘Near this spot lie the remains of Richard III, the last of the Plantagenets, 1485.' "
