= The Dene Hospital =

- The Priory Group
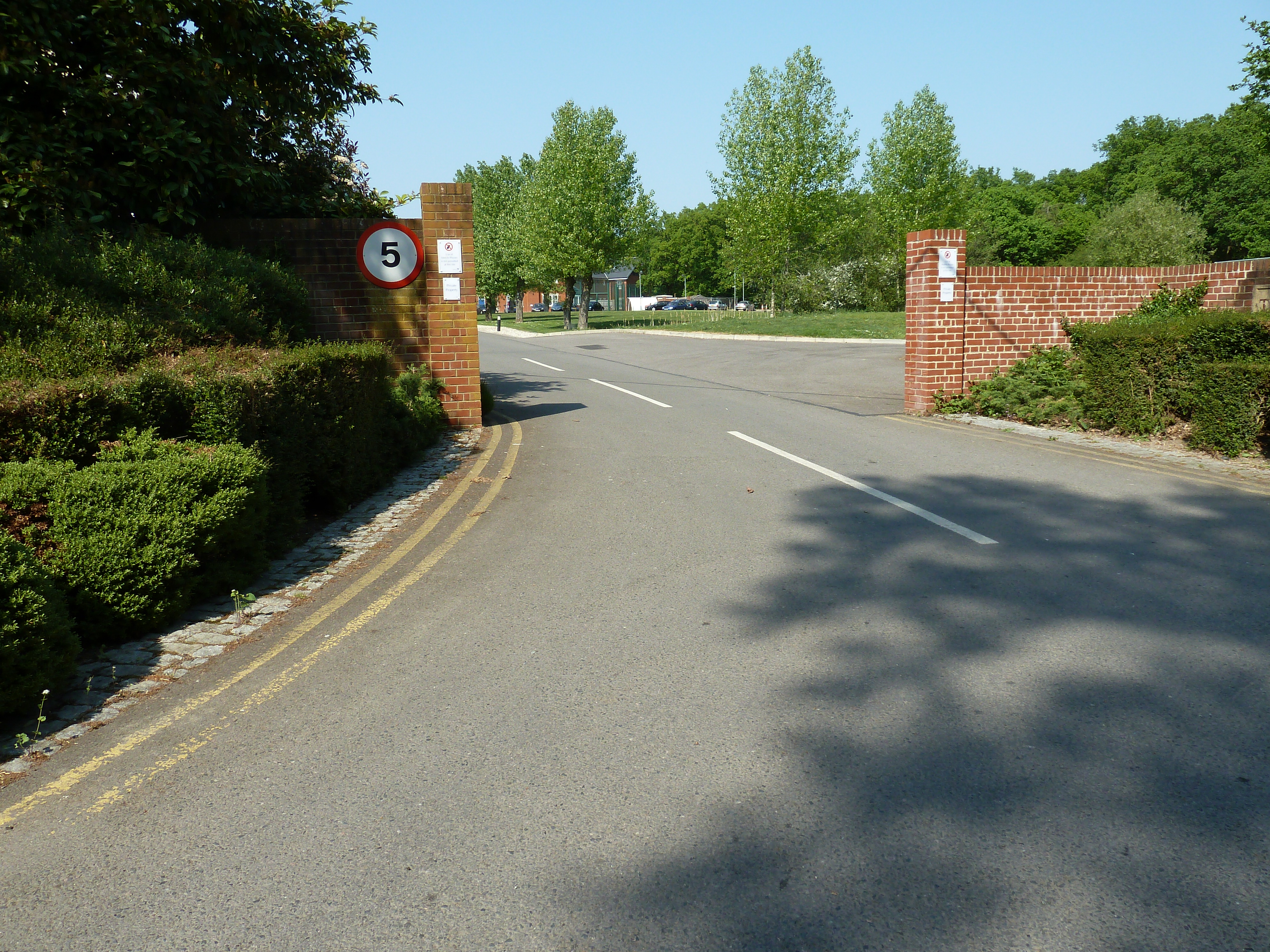
- Main Entrance to The Dene Hospital

- Shown in West Sussex

Geography
- Location: Gatehouse Lane, Goddards Green, West Sussex, England, United Kingdom
- Coordinates: 50.9656°N 0.1651°W

Organisation
- Care system: National Health Service
- Type: Private

Services
- Emergency department: No Accident & Emergency

History
- Founded: 1902

Links
- Lists: Hospitals in England

The Dene Hospital is a private hospital in Gatehouse Lane, Goddards Green, West Sussex, England. It is managed by the Priory Group.

== History ==
The original facility on the site, which was designed by George Thomas Hine, opened as the Cuckfield Isolation Hospital in May 1902. It joined the National Health Service as the Mid-Sussex Isolation Hospital in 1948 and became Goddards Green Hospital in 1960. After the Goddards Green Hospital closed in the 1990s, the site was acquired by the Priory Group, which established a mental health unit there, initially known as The Dene, and, from 2018, branded as the "Priory Hospital Burgess Hill".
