= St Andrew's Hospital, Norwich =

Defunct mental health facility

St Andrew's Hospital
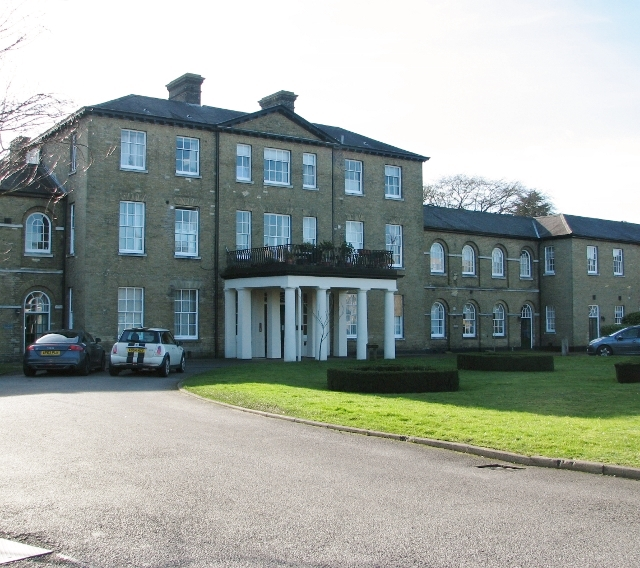
- St Andrew's Hospital

- Shown in Norfolk

Geography
- Location: Norwich, England
- Coordinates: 52.6276°N 1.3668°E

Organisation
- Care system: NHS
- Type: Specialist

Services
- Speciality: Mental health

History
- Founded: 1814
- Closed: 1998

Links
- Lists: Hospitals in England

St Andrew's Hospital was a mental health facility in Thorpe St Andrew, Norwich, Norfolk, England. The main building survives and it is a Grade II listed building.

== History ==
The hospital, which was designed by Francis Stone using an early corridor layout, opened as the Norfolk County Asylum in May 1814. Wings to the ward blocks, designed by John Brown, were added in 1849 and a large auxiliary building for chronic patients, designed by Robinson Cornish and Gaymer, was completed in 1881. The hospital was requisitioned for military use as the Norfolk War Hospital during the First World War and was then renamed the Norfolk County Mental Hospital in 1919.

The hospital joined the National Health Service as St Andrew's Hospital in 1948. After the introduction of Care in the Community in the early 1980s, the hospital went into a period of decline and closed in April 1998. The main buildings were subsequently converted into apartments as St Andrew's Park.

== Northside ==
Northside is unlisted and was designed in 1881; in 2012, two thirds of it were demolished but the clock tower, two ranges on either side, the former mortuary and pavilion were kept. In October 2023 there was a fire which was believed to be arson.
