= Rubery Hill Hospital =

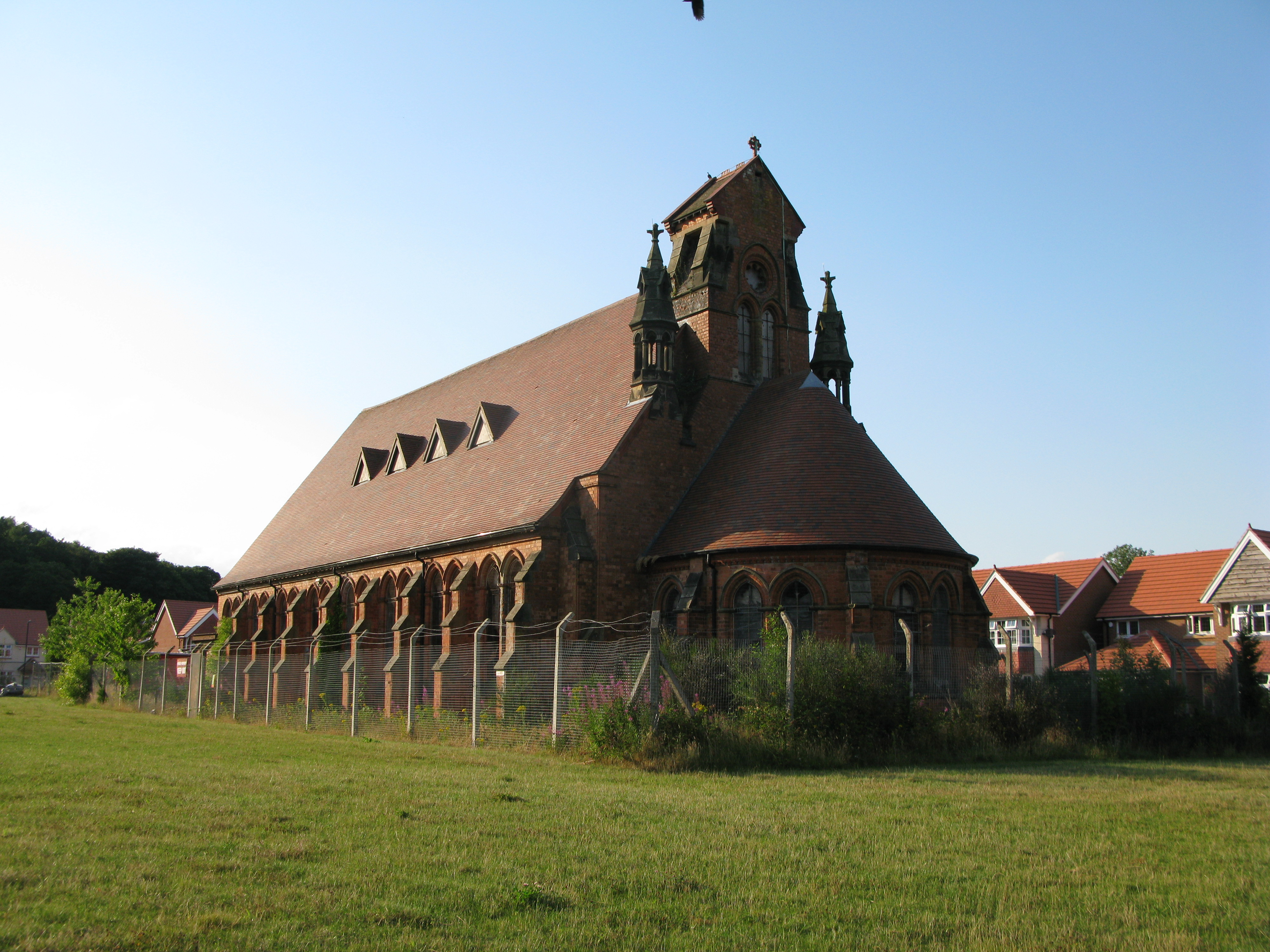
- The former hospital chapel

- Shown in West Midlands

Geography
- Location: Nightingale Grove, Birmingham, West Midlands, England
- Coordinates: 52.3982°N 2.0143°W

Organisation
- Care system: NHS
- Type: Specialist

Services
- Emergency department: N/A
- Speciality: Psychiatric Hospital

History
- Founded: 1882
- Closed: 1993

Links
- Lists: Hospitals in England

Rubery Hill Hospital was a mental health facility in Birmingham, England. The chapel, which still survives, is a Grade II listed building.

== History ==
The hospital, which was designed by William Martin and John Henry Chamberlain using a Standard Pavilion layout, opened as the Second Birmingham City Asylum in January 1882. Additional ward pavilions were completed in 1897. It became the 1st Birmingham War Hospital during the First World War and then became Rubery Hill Mental Hospital in 1919. During the Second World War it remained a civilian establishment. It joined the National Health Service as Rubery Hill Hospital in 1948. Patient numbers peaked in the 1950s.

After the introduction of Care in the Community in the early 1980s, the hospital went into a period of decline and closed in 1993. Most of the buildings were subsequently demolished and have been replaced by housing.
