= St Clement's Hospital, Ipswich =

St Clement's Hospital
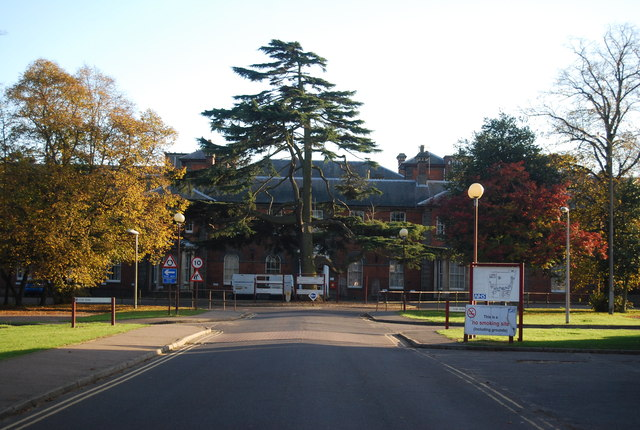
- Entrance to St Clement's Hospital

- Shown in Suffolk

Geography
- Location: Ipswich, England
- Coordinates: 52.0509°N 1.1930°E

Organisation
- Care system: NHS
- Type: Specialist

Services
- Speciality: Mental health

History
- Founded: 1870
- Closed: 2002

Links
- Lists: Hospitals in England

St Clement's Hospital was a mental health facility at Foxhall Road in Ipswich, Suffolk, England.

== History ==
The hospital, which was designed by William Ribbans in the Italianate style using a single linear corridor layout, opened as the Ipswich Borough Lunatic Asylum in 1870. An extra story was added to the building in the 1890s and it became Ipswich Mental Hospital in 1908. The hospital joined the National Health Service as St Clement's Hospital in 1948.

After the introduction of Care in the Community in the early 1980s, the hospital went into a period of decline and closed in 2002. The main buildings were subsequently converted into offices for administrative use by Norfolk and Suffolk NHS Foundation Trust. This use continued until early 2017 when the buildings were converted into apartments as Belgrove Place.
