= Towers Hospital =

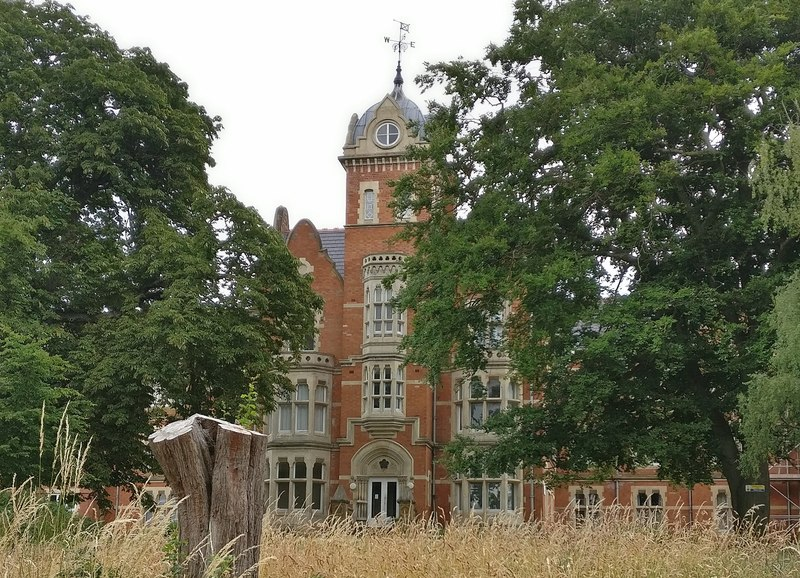
- Original main block with superintendent's residence above, Towers Hospital

- Shown in Leicestershire

Geography
- Location: Humberstone, Leicestershire, England
- Coordinates: 52.6498°N 1.0911°W

Organisation
- Care system: NHS
- Type: Specialist

Services
- Emergency department: N/A
- Speciality: Psychiatric Hospital

History
- Former names: Victoria House, George Hine House
- Founded: 1869
- Closed: 2013

Links
- Lists: Hospitals in England
- Other links: https://www.youtube.com/watch?v=pIvozSRZA3c

The Towers Hospital was a mental health facility in Humberstone, Leicestershire, England. The administration building, which became known as George Hine House, is a Grade II listed building. The property, which was originally a home on a family estate owned by the Broadbent family was transformed into what would become the hospital after being sold to the Leicester Borough Council in 1862. Adjacent to the main building is Benjamin Court which is named after the original owner, Benjamin Broadbent.

== History ==
=== Broadbent ownership ===
The site chosen for the hospital had previously been occupied by Victoria House (of which the main block still remains), the former home of Benjamin Broadbent, a leading businessman, master builder, and architect, whose works were well renowned across the Midlands at the time. He built a house on the site in the late 1850s, and moved in during early 1860. Following his death in 1862, his son Benjamin Jr. sold the house and 30 acres of land to the Leicester Borough Council for £8,000. The house had to be demolished due to dry rot, and the grounds were used for the Leicester Towers Hospital.

=== The Hospital ===
The hospital, which was designed by Edward Loney Stephens using a corridor layout with compact arrow additions, opened as the Leicester Borough Lunatic Asylum in September 1869. An extension to the male ward, designed by George Thomas Hine, was completed in 1883 and a corresponding extension to the female ward, also designed by Hine, was completed in 1890. A bath house, also designed by Hine, was added in 1913. The facility became the Leicester City Mental Hospital in the 1920s. Three detached villa properties, built in the 1930s, were made available to the Emergency Medical Service during the Second World War. The facility joined the National Health Service as the Towers Hospital in 1948.

After the introduction of Care in the Community in the early 1980s, the hospital went into a period of decline and closed in April 2013. Inpatient wards were closed in 2000 after which outpatients were treated in the former male wards, a facility now named the Daisy Peake Building. The administration building, which became known as George Hine House, was converted for use as a Sikh free school in 2014. Several of the other buildings, including the original main block with superintendent's residence above, have been redeveloped for residential use.
