= Mid Wales Hospital =

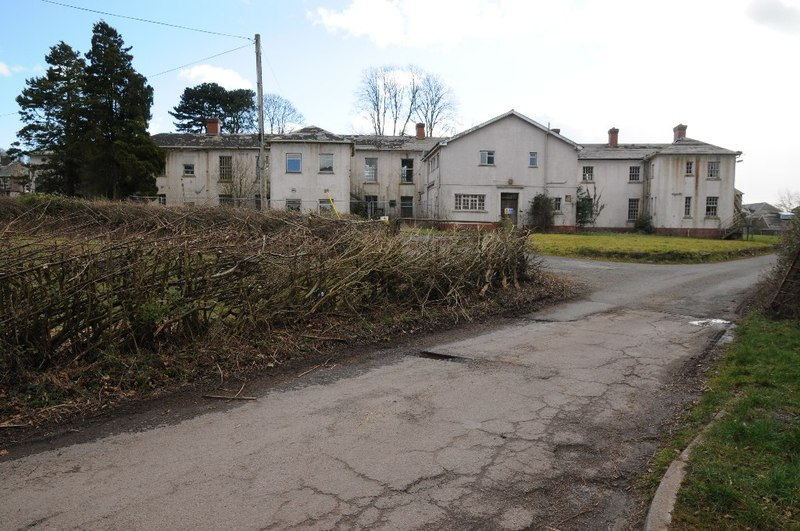
- Mid Wales Hospital

- Shown in Powys

Geography
- Location: Talgarth, Powys, Wales
- Coordinates: 51.9904°N 3.2198°W

Organisation
- Care system: NHS
- Type: Specialist

Services
- Speciality: Mental health

History
- Founded: 1903
- Closed: 1999

Links
- Lists: Hospitals in Wales

The Mid Wales Hospital (Welsh: Ysbyty Canolbarth Cymru) was a psychiatric hospital in Talgarth, Wales.

== History ==
=== Early years ===
The building, designed by Messrs Giles, Gough and Trollope of London followed the compact arrow plan and was built at a cost of £126,000. Originally named the Brecon and Radnor Joint Counties Lunatic Asylum, it was opened amid public ceremony on 18 March 1903, by Lord Glanusk who said of it "everything has been done that human ingenuity could devise for the happiness and safety of the inmates, and under the blessing of God, for their speedy restoration to health."

Like other contemporary institutions, the asylum was designed to be self-sufficient, and had its own private water, electricity, heating and sewerage systems as well as a considerable agricultural estate on which able-bodied patients worked to produce food for the hospital. As well as residential wards, the hospital had a large recreation and dining hall, kitchens, workshops "in which the patients [were] encouraged to spend their time profitably", a tailor, bakery, shoe-maker and printing shops as well as 8 acres of market gardens.

Initially dedicated to treating patients from the counties of Brecknockshire and Radnorshire, after the First World War, patients from Montgomeryshire were also admitted, and the asylum was extended and renamed the Mid-Wales Counties Mental Hospital.

During the Second World War the hospital took in 67 male and 48 female patients from Cardiff City Mental Hospital which had been requisitioned as a war hospital. In July 1940 it was agreed that most of the hospital should be given over to military use and most of the patients were transferred to other Welsh mental hospitals. The hospital was returned to civilian use in 1947.

In 1948 the hospital became part of the National Health Service. NHS management brought a number of innovations, including art and occupational therapy and the integration of the sexes, who had previously occupied opposite sides of the hospital. The site also became home to the Mid and West Wales College of Nursing and Midwifery and the Powys Drugs & Alcohol Council for substance misuse. Other services included treatments for the elderly mentally ill, rehabilitation and continuing care, day care, reflexology, physiotherapy, electro-convulsive therapy; chiropody and psychiatry.

=== Decline and sale ===
After the introduction of Care in the Community in the early 1980s the hospital went into a period of decline and it finally closed in 1999. Some facilities moved into nearby Bronllys Hospital (formerly the South Wales Sanitorium).

Following closure, the buildings and surrounding estate were sold to the former Chief Medical Officer for just £227,000. Plans were subsequently made to redevelop the site as business park, and indeed several buildings were converted and occupied by local companies as part of the Black Mountains Business Park. However, due to the site's isolated location and the global recession, the venture failed and only one or two businesses remained on the site by early 2009.

In 2009 the site was offered for sale. By this time, several properties that once belonged to the hospital, such as the gatehouse, had been sold off and the buildings were becoming derelict. It featured in Season 1 of the BBC series Hidden Wales where its plight was brought to attention. There are signs of demolition throughout the site and many of the original slates (believed to be worth in excess of £1 million) were stripped from the roofs. The large derelict site has become an attraction to many urban explorers despite improved security measures.

== See also ==
- North Wales Hospital
