= Claybury Hospital =

- Forest Healthcare (NHS) Trust
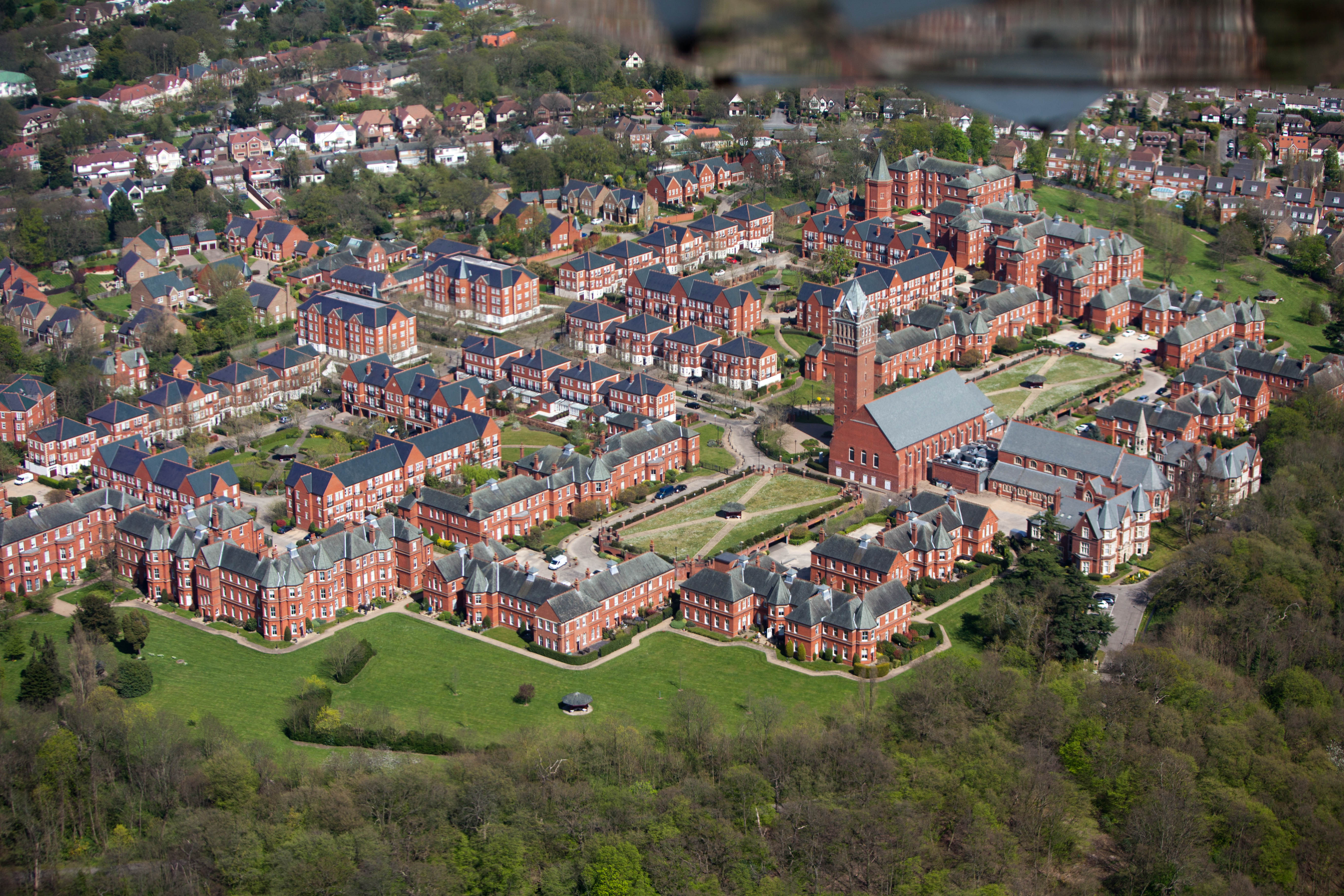
- Claybury Hospital

- Location within Redbridge

Geography
- Location: Woodford Bridge, Redbridge, England, United Kingdom
- Coordinates: 51.6031°N 0.0687°E

Organisation
- Care system: NHS England
- Type: Psychiatric hospital

Services
- Beds: 2,500

History
- Founded: 1893
- Closed: 1997

Links
- Lists: Hospitals in England

Claybury Hospital was a psychiatric hospital in Woodford Bridge, London. It was built to a design by the English architect George Thomas Hine who was a prolific Victorian architect of hospital buildings. It was opened in 1893 making it the Fifth Middlesex County Asylum. Historic England identified the hospital as being "the most important asylum built in England after 1875".

Since the closure of the hospital, the site was redeveloped as housing and a gymnasium under the name Repton Park. The hospital block, tower, and chapel, which is now a swimming complex, were designated as a Grade II listed building in 1990.

== History ==
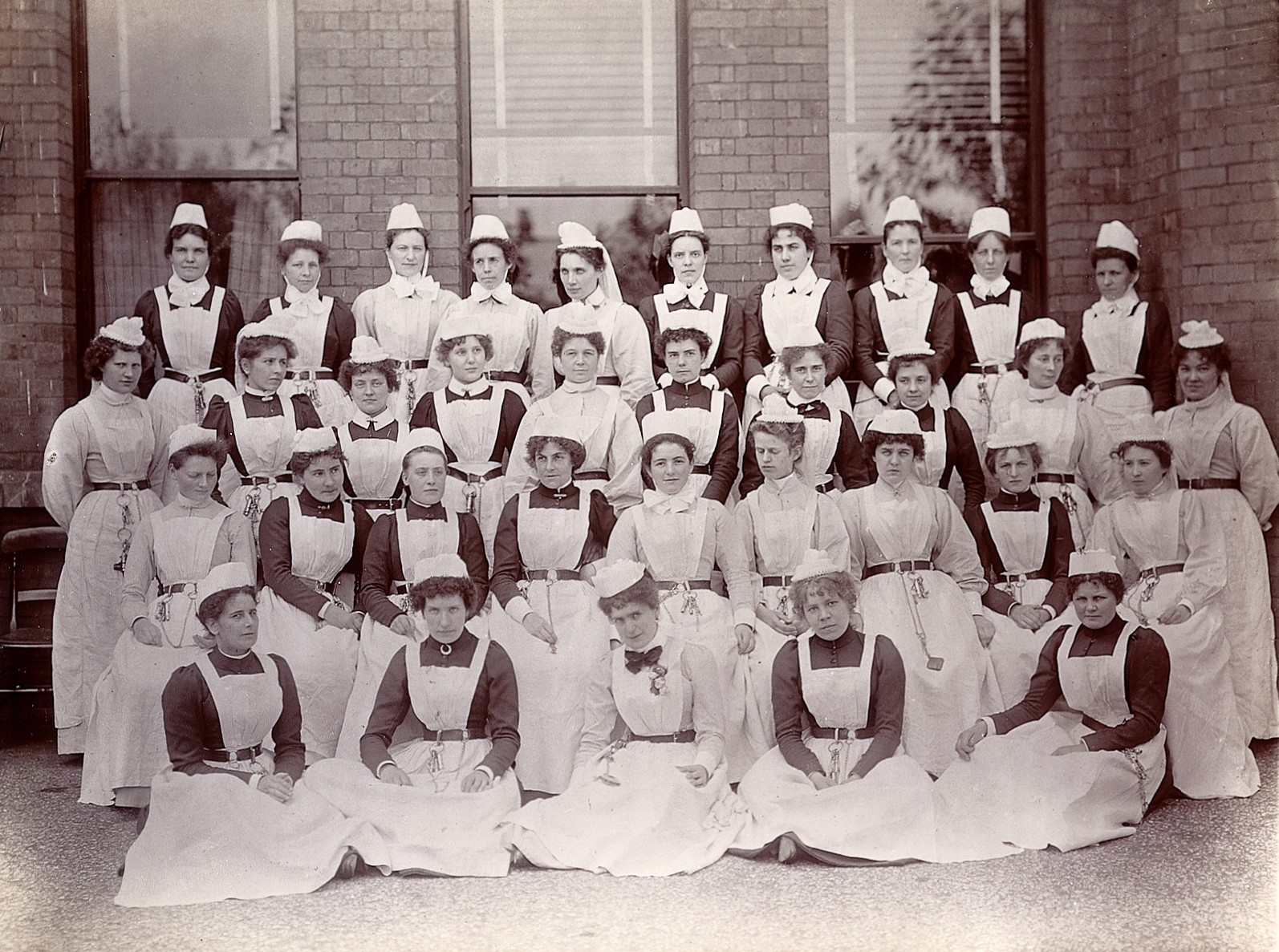
34 nurses at the Claybury Asylum, possibly 1893

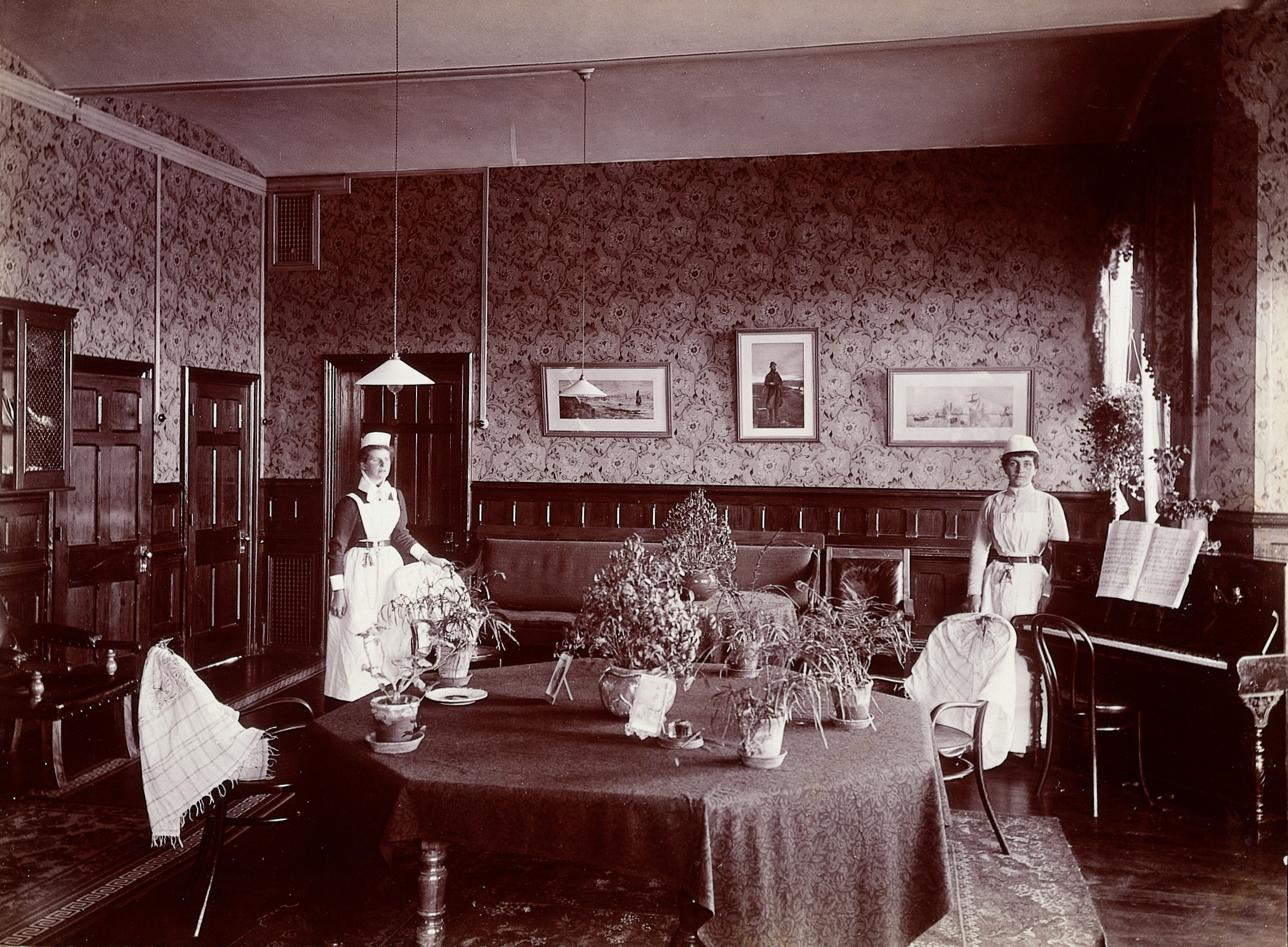
A social room at Claybury Asylum. Photograph by the London & County Photographic Company from 1893.

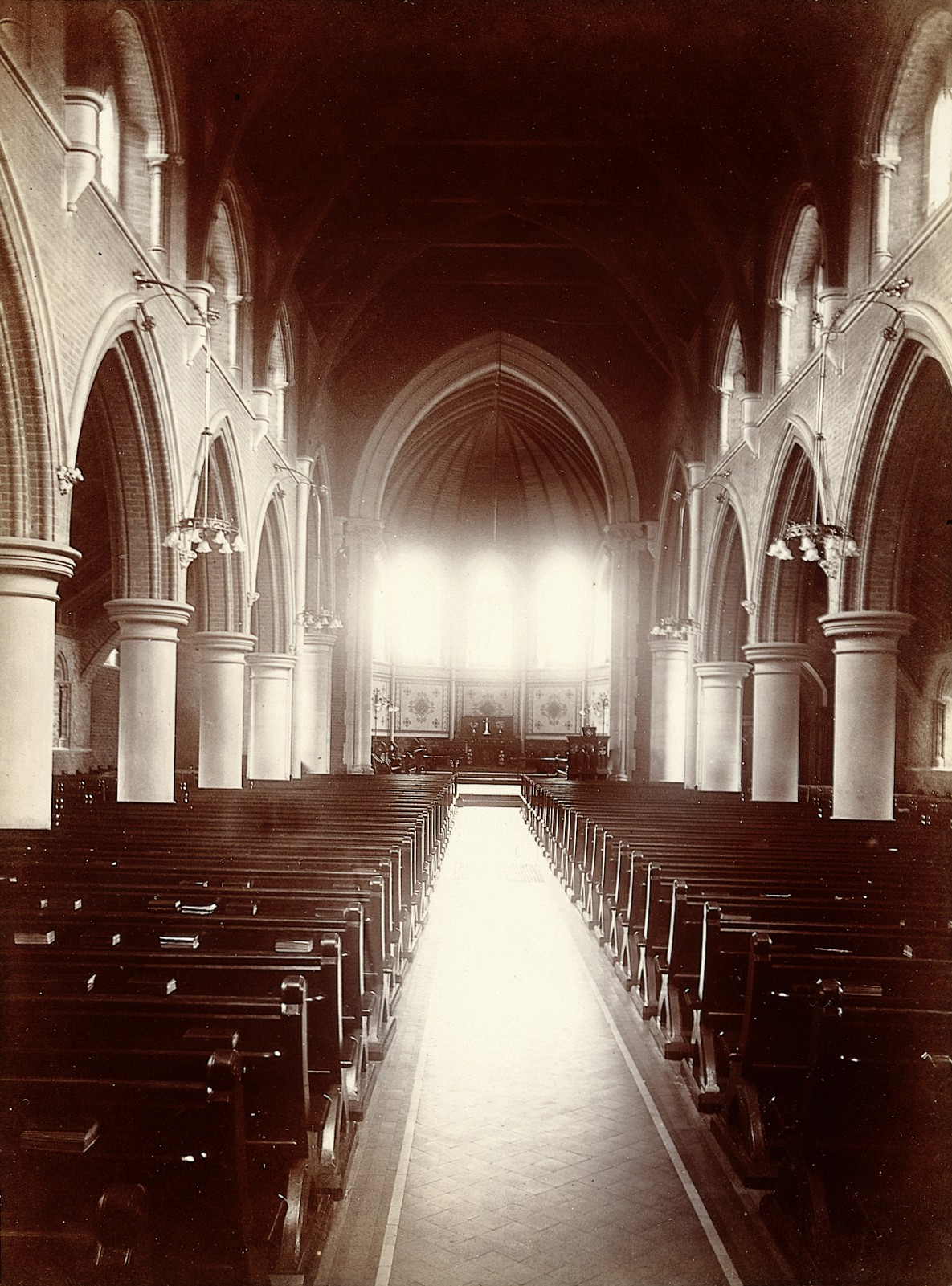
The Chapel at Claybury Asylum. Photograph by the London & County Photographic Company, possibly 1893, but virtually unchanged throughout its working life.

=== The project ===
The building of Claybury Hospital was commissioned by the Middlesex Court of Magistrates in 1887 and would eventually become the fifth Middlesex County Asylum. It was built to a design by the English architect George Thomas Hine who was a prolific, late-Victorian architect of mainly hospital buildings and asylums for the mentally insane. It was the first asylum to successfully use the echelon plan upon which all later asylums were based.

The site was situated on the brow of a hill and was surrounded by 50 acres (200,000 m^{2}) of ancient woodland and 95 acres (380,000 m^{2}) of open parkland, ponds, pasture and historic gardens. These had been designed in 1789 by the landscape architect Humphry Repton.

=== Early years ===
In 1889 the uncompleted building passed to the newly created London County Council which opened it in 1893 as the Claybury Lunatic Asylum.

By 1896, the hospital had 2,500 patients. The first Medical Superintendent and directing genius was Robert Armstrong-Jones. By the first decade of the twentieth century, Claybury had become a major centre of psychiatric learning. It was internationally admired for its research, its pioneering work in introducing new forms of treatment and the high standard of care provided for the mentally ill. Armstrong-Jones was knighted in 1917 for his exceptional work at Claybury and his general service to psychiatry.

Armstrong-Jones held progressive views on community care, advocating in 1906 that city hospitals should have out-patient departments where patients could seek help for mental symptoms without loss of liberty. Each asylum should be a centre for clinical instruction where all medical practitioners could refresh their understanding of insanity. People showing early signs of insanity should be free to seek advice and if necessary be admitted on a voluntary basis and not have to wait until they became certifiable. The first voluntary patients could not admitted until 1930 when the Mental Treatment Act was passed.

In 1895, the London County Council appointed Frederick Mott as director for their new research laboratory at Claybury. Over the next 19 years he carried out vast research, documented in his Archives of Neurology and Psychiatry published between 1903 and 1922. He was knighted in 1919 and is particularly remembered for helping to establish that 'general paralysis of the insane (GPI) was due to syphilis.

Helen Boyle was appointed as an Assistant Medical Officer in 1895, one of the first women to be employed as a doctor in an asylum. She became a pioneer of early treatment for the mentally ill and went on to found the Lady Chichester Hospital. In 1939 she became the first female president of the Royal Medico-Psychological Association (now the Royal College of Psychiatrists). In Pryor's words: "The work of this 'lady doctor' formed part of the pale new dawn of community care for the mentally ill."

The asylum was renamed Claybury Mental Hospital in 1930 and simplified to Claybury Hospital in 1959.

=== A patient experience in the 1930s ===
The English artist, Thomas Hennell, published an account of his personal experience of schizophrenia in his book, The Witnesses, in 1938. Sectioned and detained at St John's Hospital, Stone, Buckinghamshire in 1935, he was then moved to the Maudsley Hospital in London, and finally, to Claybury. He disliked his treatment at the first two, and satirised the Maudsley psychiatrists, but he enjoyed the humane therapy at Claybury (though there is a signed drawing by him in the Tate of staff stealing from a patient in Claybury). In the course of his illness he produced several pictures that depicted his mental state. Before leaving Claybury in 1938, the medical superintendent, Guy Barham, agreed to him painting a large mural covering three walls of the canteen. A photograph of this painting was rediscovered circa 2015. He became an official war artist during World War II.

=== Post-war years ===
Claybury became part of the National Health Service in 1948. The introduction of new drugs, the phenothiazines in 1955 and 1956, and the anti-depressant drugs in 1959, dramatically altered the treatment of the major psychoses, reducing the severity and duration of many conditions and creating a setting where normalisation could flourish.

From the mid-1950s Claybury again attracted widespread attention as, led by consultants Denis Martin and John Pippard, it pioneered a controversial therapeutic community approach to an entire institution of over 2,700 people. In 1968, Martin described the development of Claybury's therapeutic community in Adventure in Psychiatry. In 1972 a collection of essays by staff members and edited by Elizabeth Shoenberg were published under the title, A Hospital Looks at Itself:

The three pronged attack of therapeutic community techniques, use of new drugs and minimal use of the physical treatments, led to a reduction of the patient population from 2,332 in 1950 to 1,537 in 1970. However, lack of community care resulted in the 'revolving door syndrome' with over half admissions being re-admissions.

From the late 1940s it became increasingly difficult to recruit student nurses and other support staff from the UK. Many, with little English, were recruited from Europe and given English language tuition. In 1962, Enoch Powell, then Minister of Health, proposed that hospitals should seek recruits from the West Indies and Pakistan. By 1968 there were 47 nationalities represented at Claybury with different ethnic, religious and linguistic backgrounds, all part of the therapeutic community diversity.

=== Developments in community care ===
Enoch Powell had predicted in 1961 that all psychiatric hospitals would be closed within 15 years. In reality, the first, Banstead, closed in 1986. In 1983 the North East Thames Regional Health Authority (NETRHA) committed itself to a 10-year plan for the re-provision of care currently provided by Friern and Claybury hospitals. The number of patients on Claybury's statuary books at the year end in 1980 was 1,057 and in 1990 was 429.

For some long-stay patients, thoroughly institutionalised, Claybury had been both home and local village for decades, in some cases for over 40 years. The challenge to manage their rehabilitation in a new environment, that they had never experienced and might well treat them with suspicion, was immense. In 1988 the Health and Social Services Research Unit at South Bank Polytechnic published a research paper detailing the post-discharge experience of a group of former long-stay Claybury patients.

=== Closure ===
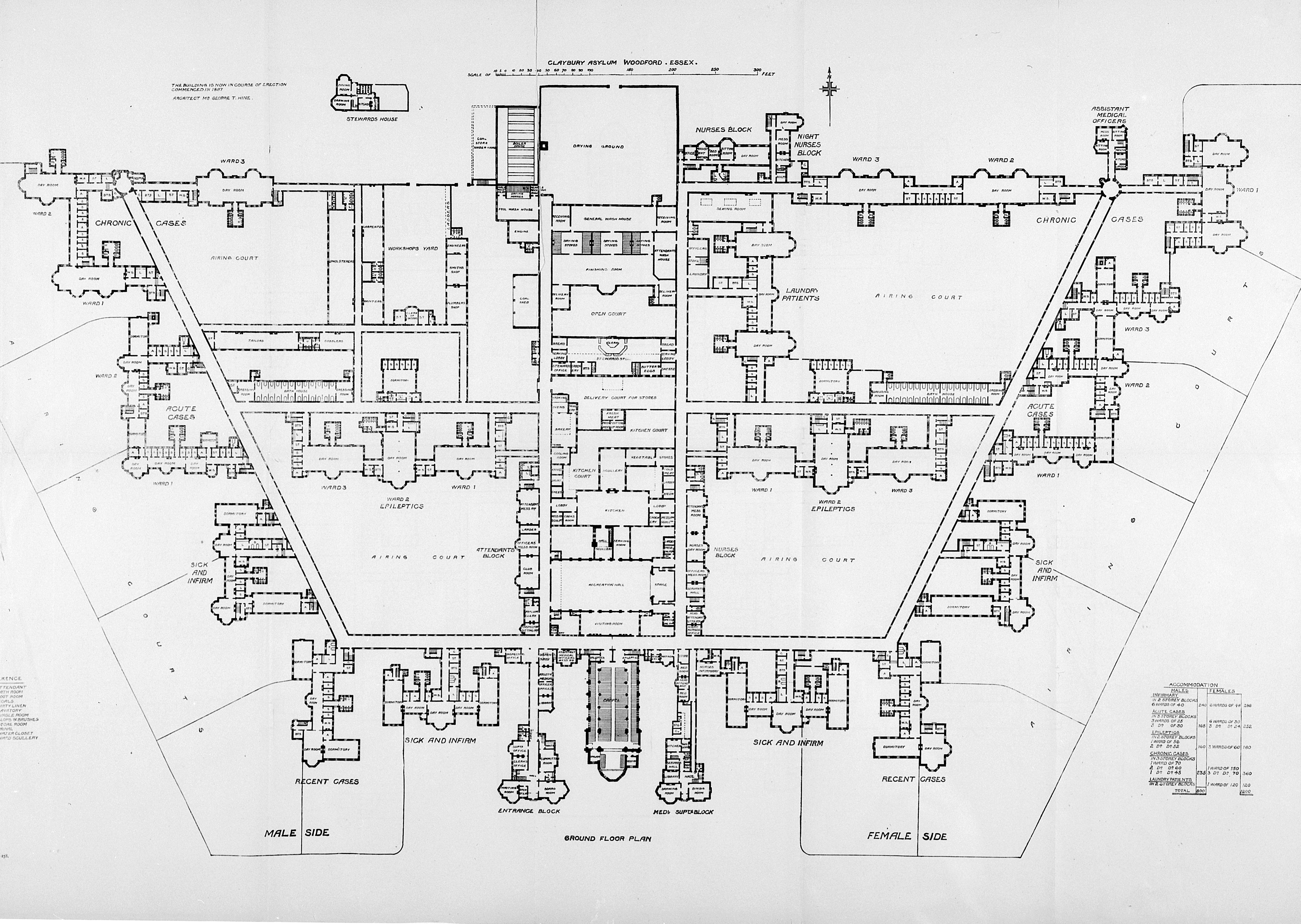
Claybury Asylum, ground floor plan

To mark its centenary in 1993, the Forest Healthcare Trust published a comprehensive and well documented history of the hospital entitled, Claybury, A Century of Caring, written by Eric Pryor who had been a member of the nursing staff since 1948.

With the Care in the Community Programme and the planned decline in patient numbers, the Claybury site faced a difficult future. The NHS pressed for extensive demolition and maximum new build, whereas the Local Planning Authority and English Heritage argued for maximum retention of the historic buildings and restriction of new build to the existing footprint, in accordance with the Green Belt allocation in the Unitary Development Plan. The hospital was closed in 1997.

Historic England identified the hospital as being "the most important asylum built in England after 1875... [it was] the first asylum to successfully use the echelon plan, upon which all later asylums were based." The hospital block was designated as a Grade II listed building in 1990, as was the stable block, which is located to the north west of the main building.

=== Repton Park ===
After the hospital was shut down in 1997 it was converted into gated housing by Crest Nicholson (working closely with English Heritage and the London Wildlife Trust) and renamed Repton Park.

The hospital chapel was converted into a swimming pool and health centre for the use of Repton Park residents. Former residents of Repton Park include singers V V Brown and Simon Webbe and actress Patsy Palmer. Properties have also attracted professional footballers from Arsenal and Spurs.

== See also ==
- Healthcare in London

== Sources ==
- Shepherd, Robert (1997). Enoch Powell: A Biography. Pimlico. ISBN 978-0712673259.
