= Burghill =

Village and civil parish in Herefordshire, England

Coordinates: 52.1°N 2.7666°W

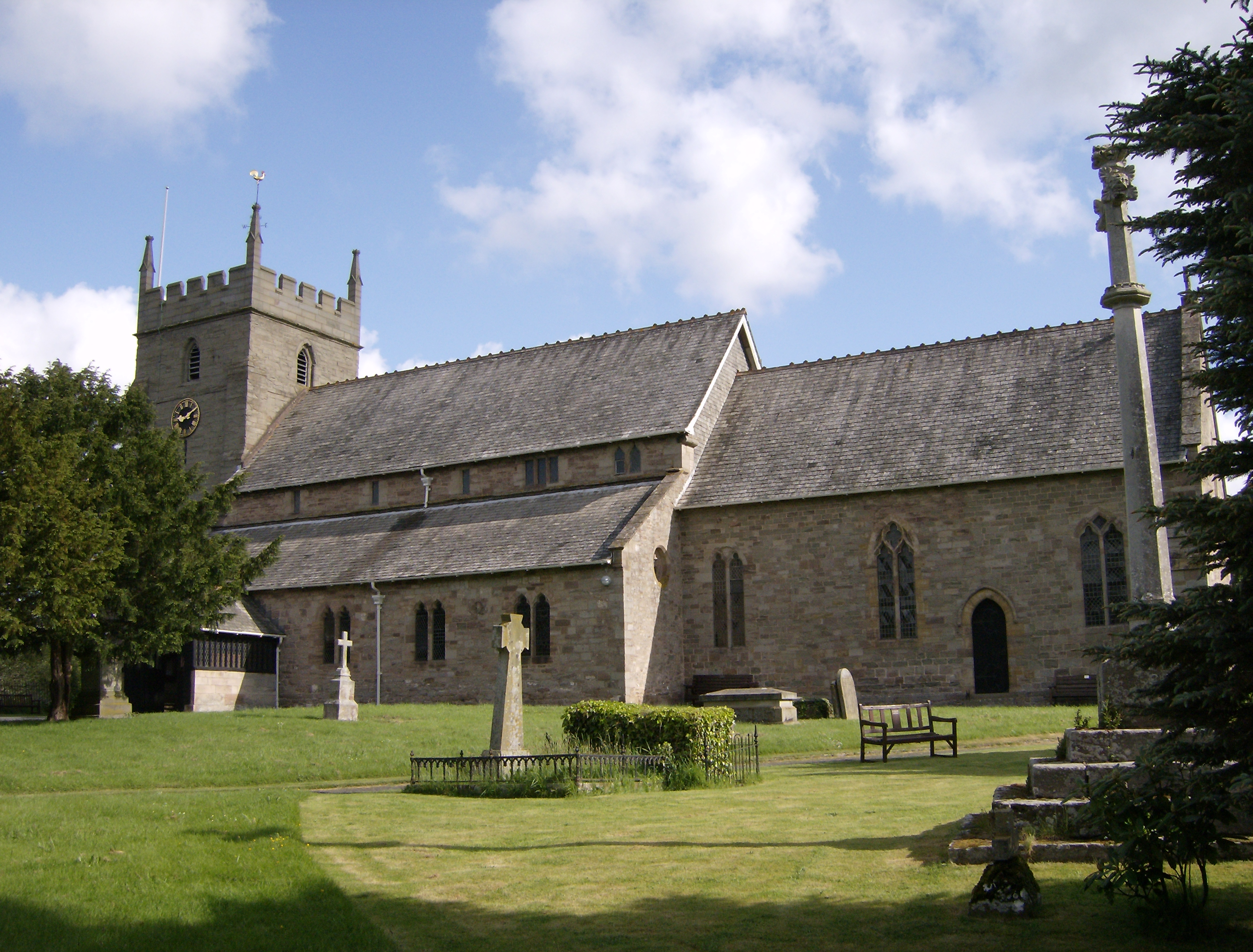
- St Mary the Virgin Church, Burghill

- Location within Herefordshire
- Population: 3,309 (2011)
- OS grid reference: SO474449
  - London: 140m
- Civil parish: Burghill
- Unitary authority: Herefordshire
- Ceremonial county: Herefordshire
- Region: West Midlands
- Country: England
- Sovereign state: United Kingdom
- Post town: HEREFORD
- Postcode district: HR4
- Dialling code: 01432
- Police: West Mercia
- Fire: Hereford and Worcester
- Ambulance: West Midlands
- UK Parliament: North Herefordshire

Burghill is a village and civil parish in Herefordshire, England, north-west of Hereford. The parish includes the villages of Burghill, Tillington, Portway and Eltons Marsh. It was originally a small village of farms and orchards situated on the road from Moreton-on-Lugg.

== History ==
There was originally an iron hill fort in prehistory on the hill north of Hereford. One of the earliest settlements in the shire it stood on a Roman road from Kenchester; it was probably recognised by Alfred the Great's 'burghal hidage'. Burghill was called Burgelle in the Domesday Book, and in Pipe Rolls, 1169, Burchil. By 1212 the Red Book of Exchequer used the name Burghulle. It has been Burghill for the last eight centuries. The village of Burghill was a feudal manor with a strip field system of villein cultivation. Its true significance however was as a nobleman's manor owned first by Bernard de Neumarch, William de Braose, and thence to Humphrey de Bohun, Earl of Hereford. It was connected to the manor of Tillington in the 13th century until Roger de Burghill sold it to Earl Berkeley of Berkeley Castle, Gloucestershire.

The manor of Burghill passed through various scions of the de Burghill family until 1303 when the de Mynors share past to Godfrey de Gamage; both families renowned locally. In the early modern period the estate was split up when Griffin Barton bought in part before in 17th century Richard Witherstone built The Lodge.

It has been suggested that Burghill may have been the site of the first castle to have been built in England. It would have been built before the Norman Conquest, about the year 1051, by Normans in the service of Osbern Pentecost, a follower of Ralph de Mantes and supporter of Edward the Confessor.

The Hereford County and City Lunatic Asylum, later known as St Mary's Hospital after the church, was erected in the village in 1868. It closed in the 20th century after use as a psychiatric hospital, and was demolished to make way for a housing estate in 1994.

== Church ==
A Norman church, St Mary the Virgin was graced with a visitation from the romantic poets William Wordsworth, who frequented the county often, S.T. Coleridge, and Robert Southey, a poet laureate. In the churchyard stood an ancient Yew tree, that can live for a 1,000 years, the trunk in the early 1800s measured 25 ft (10 m) girth. A dozen such trees were known as the Twelve Apostles. The disciples were used to decorate around the font inside the church, which was rare as a lead covered example around its base. In about 1838 a large oak tree fell on the church and crushed the font.

The church dates from the 13th century in the north aisle of clerestory nave, and the south aisle is 14th century. The chancel was also 14th century: despite the imposition of modern "bays" to the identification, the arcades were perfect in the 20th century.

The churchyard contains two war graves of World War I British Army soldiers.

The Rector of the church is the Reverend Dr Phillip Brown.

== Other facilities ==
The village hall, the Simpson Hall, has been modernised. There is a golf club, Burghill Valley Golf Club, in the heart of the village. The whole area is surrounded by apple and pear orchards and is a centre for tourism. The local pub is the Bell Inn, situated between Burghill and Tillington.

== Governance ==
Burghill falls within the electoral ward of Burghill, Holmer and Lyde. At the 2011 census the population of this ward was 3,309.
