= Kingsway Hospital =

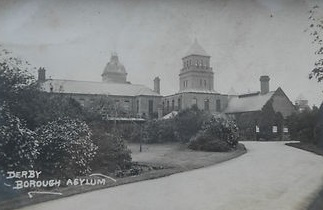
- Kingsway Hospital

- Shown in Derbyshire

Geography
- Location: Derby, Derbyshire, England
- Coordinates: 52.9186°N 1.5134°W

Organisation
- Care system: NHS
- Type: Specialist

Services
- Emergency department: N/A
- Speciality: Psychiatric Hospital

History
- Founded: 1888
- Closed: 2009

Links
- Lists: Hospitals in England

Kingsway Hospital was a mental health facility in Derby, England.

== History ==
The hospital, which was designed by Benjamin Jacobs using a dual courtyard layout, opened as the Derby Borough Asylum in November 1888. An additional block was completed in 1891, a private annex for fee-paying patients, known as Albany House, was added in 1903 and a nurses' home, known as Bramble House, was completed in 1931. It became Derby Mental Hospital in 1912 and Kingsway Hospital in 1938 before joining the National Health Service in 1948.

After the introduction of Care in the Community in the early 1980s, the hospital went into a period of decline and patient numbers reduced significantly. In the late 1990s eleven men died in unusual circumstances at the hospital: an inquiry led by Sir Richard Rougier found that food and drink had been deliberately withheld. The hospital finally closed in December 2009. Most of the buildings have since been demolished and the site redeveloped by Kier Group as Manor Kingsway. Bramble House, one of the few surviving buildings, was sold for commercial development in 2018.
