= St Mary's Hospital, Burghill =

St. Mary's Hospital
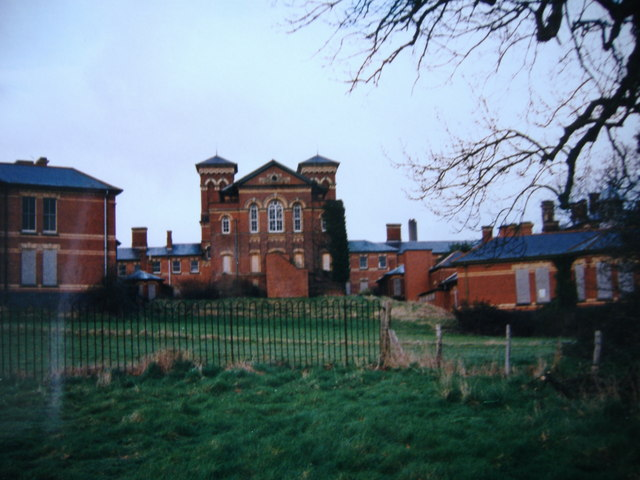
- St.Mary's Hospital, Burghill

- Shown in Herefordshire

Geography
- Location: Burghill, Herefordshire, England
- Coordinates: 52.0863°N 2.7554°W

Organisation
- Type: Specialist

Services
- Speciality: Psychiatric

Helipads
- Helipad: No

History
- Founded: 1868
- Closed: 1994

Links
- Lists: Hospitals in England

St. Mary's Hospital was a psychiatric facility located in the village of Burghill, Herefordshire.

== History ==
Herefordshire initially utilised subscription asylum premises within the Hereford General Infirmary site and following the 1845 act entered into agreement with the Welsh counties of Monmouthshire, Radnorshire and Breconshire to construct the joint counties premises at Abergavenny. Breakdown of the union led to Herefordshire providing its own asylum located close to the County Town of Hereford. The facility was designed by architect Robert Griffiths, County Surveyor of Staffordshire, and the construction, which cost £87,873, started in 1868. It opened as the Hereford County and City Lunatic Asylum in August 1871.

There were a further 100 acres of gardens, a farm and several cottages. The main asylum was divided into a block for men and one for women, each wing constructed to house 200 patients. The 1881 census reveals that few were under 20 years of age and again few were over 70. The head attendant, a 61-year old male, had become a private patient himself.

The asylum appears to have been a well-run establishment and seems to have met with the approval of the Committee of Visitors in the years leading up to 1889. The chairman, B.L.S. Stanhope, expressed his satisfaction that "since the Asylum was opened, there is no record of any death of a homicidal or suicidal character; a fact testifying to the careful supervision exercised over the patients."

The facility was extended to a design by John Giles, Gough and Trollope in the early 20th century. It was renamed Burghill Mental Hospital in the 1930s. It joined the National Health Service in 1948 and was subsequently renamed St. Mary's Hospital, taking its name from the local parish church, in the 1930s. The hospital closed in 1994 and main building was subsequently demolished.
