= Rauceby Hospital =

- Lincolnshire Partnership NHS Foundation Trust
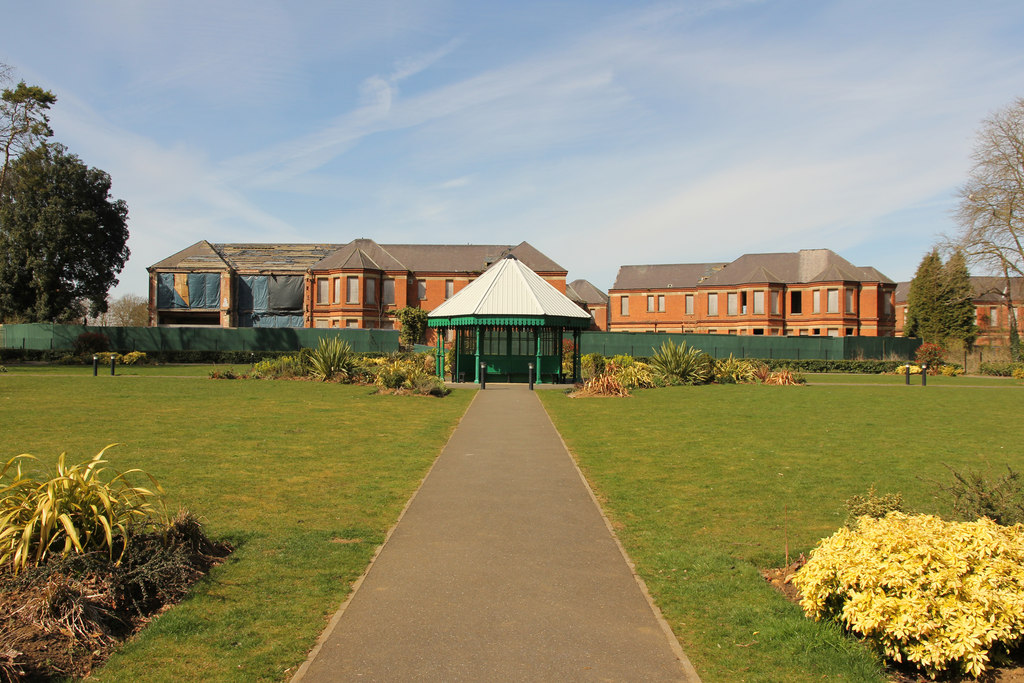
- Rauceby Hospital

- Shown in Lincolnshire

Geography
- Location: Sleaford, Lincolnshire, England
- Coordinates: 52.9839°N 0.4509°W

Organisation
- Care system: NHS
- Type: Mental health

History
- Founded: 1897
- Closed: 1997

Links
- Lists: Hospitals in England

Rauceby Hospital, originally called Kesteven County Asylum, is a now-defunct mental institution in the parish of Quarrington, Lincolnshire, England. Originally opened in 1902, the main hospital building was closed in 1997 and the site has since been redeveloped as Greylees.

== History ==
The hospital was designed by George Thomas Hine using an "echelon layout". Construction began in 1897 and it was officially opened as Kesteven County Asylum on 20 June 1902. The gardens were designed under a separate contract by William Goldring.

An isolation unit, built in 1919 on the western edge of the site was never used as such; instead it housed those residents working on the farm. The facility became Kesteven Mental Hospital in 1924 and Rauceby Mental Hospital in 1933.

In 1940 the building was taken over by the Royal Air Force; renamed as No.4 RAF Hospital Rauceby, it became a crash and burns unit under the control of nearby RAF Cranwell. During its tenure as a burns unit plastic surgeon Archibald McIndoe worked at the facility, along with other members of the "Guinea Pig Club". The wartime Burns Unit was situated in Orchard House, built alongside the hospital orchard.

There was a major fire in the hall in 1945 and it was badly damaged although it was subsequently restored. The RAF handed the hospital back for civilian use in 1947 and it joined the National Health Service as Rauceby Hospital in 1948 although patients did not actually return until 1949.

After the introduction of Care in the Community in the early 1980s, the hospital went through a period of decline and finally closed in December 1997. The site was subsequently developed for residential use by David Wilson Homes as "Greylees".

The former isolation unit, now known as Ash Villa, functions as a 12-bedded in-patient unit for age 12–18 years within the child and adolescent mental health services under the control of the Lincolnshire Partnership NHS Foundation Trust.
