= Parc Hospital =

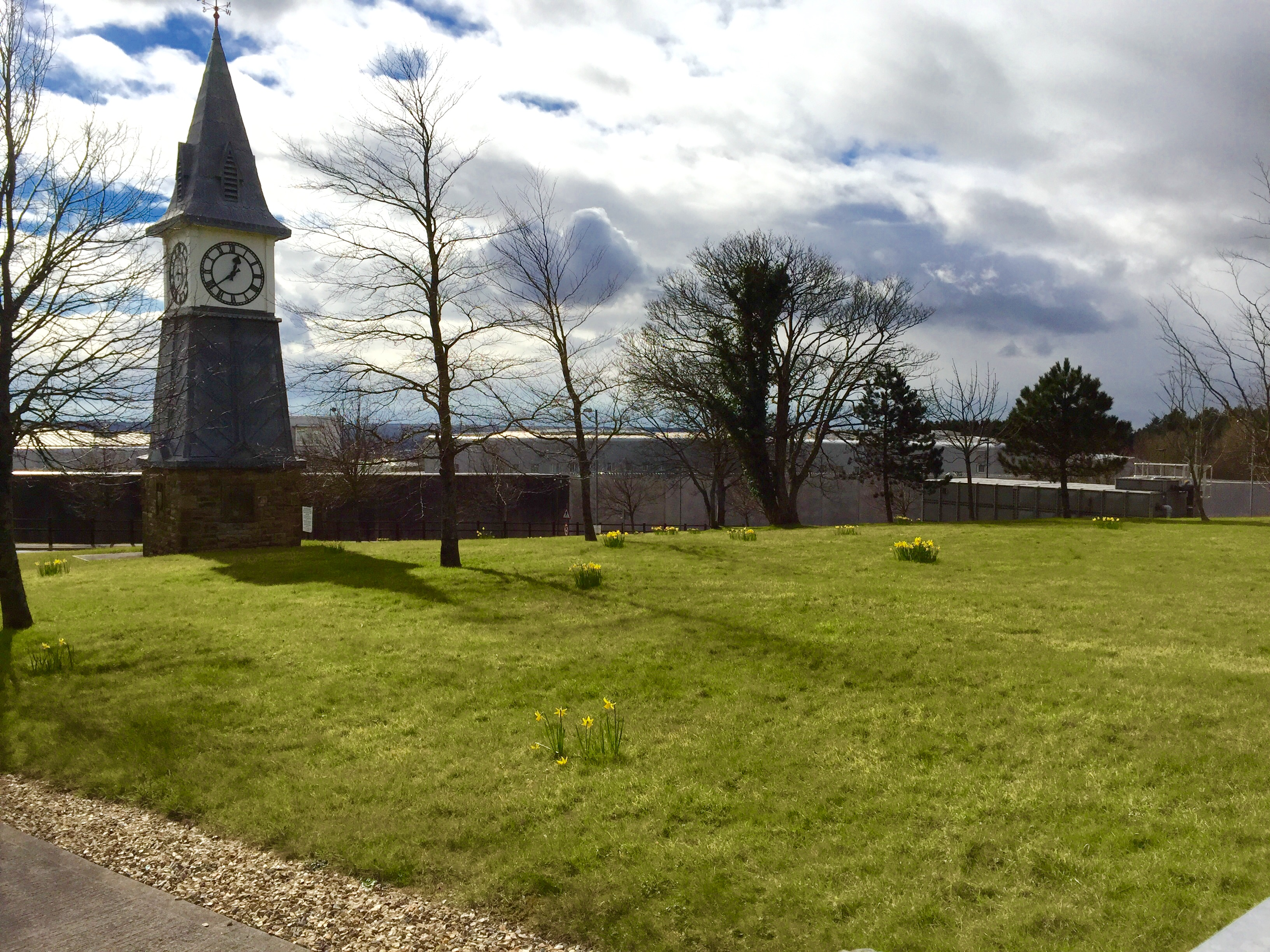
- Clocktower from Parc Hospital

- Shown in Bridgend County Borough

Geography
- Location: Bridgend, Wales
- Coordinates: 51.5320°N 3.5646°W

Organisation
- Care system: NHS
- Type: Specialist

Services
- Speciality: Mental health

History
- Founded: 1886
- Closed: 1996

Links
- Lists: Hospitals in Wales

Parc Hospital (Welsh: Ysbyty Parc) was a mental health facility at Bridgend in Wales.

== History ==
Parc Gwyllt Farm and Gelliau Farm were identified in 1880 as forming a site suitable for the purposes of building an asylum. The hospital, which was designed by Giles, Gough and Trollope using a compact arrow layout, opened as the Second Glamorgan County Lunatic Asylum in 1886. It became Parc Gwyllt County Mental Hospital in the 1920s and joined the National Health Service as Parc Hospital in 1948.

After the introduction of Care in the Community in the early 1980s, the hospital went into a period of decline and closed in 1996. The hospital was subsequently demolished and the site redeveloped as Parc Prison in 1997. The old clocktower from Park Hospital has been restored and remains visible to the public on the Parc Prison site.
