= Robert Wilfred Skeffington Lutwidge =

Robert Wilfred Skeffington Lutwidge (17 January 1802 – 28 May 1873) was an English barrister, Commissioner in Lunacy and early photographer. He was the uncle of Charles Lutwidge Dodgson, better known as Lewis Carroll.

He joined the Photographic Society of London, later the Royal Photographic Society, in the 1850s. He passed this interest on to his nephew Charles.

He was one of the Metropolitan Commissioners in Lunacy from 1842 to 1845 and was then appointed the first Secretary to the successor body, the Commissioners in Lunacy, in 1845: he became one of the three Legal Commissioners in 1855. He died in May 1873 from injuries inflicted by a patient in Fisherton House Asylum, Salisbury, during an inspection.
