= Barnsley Hall Hospital =

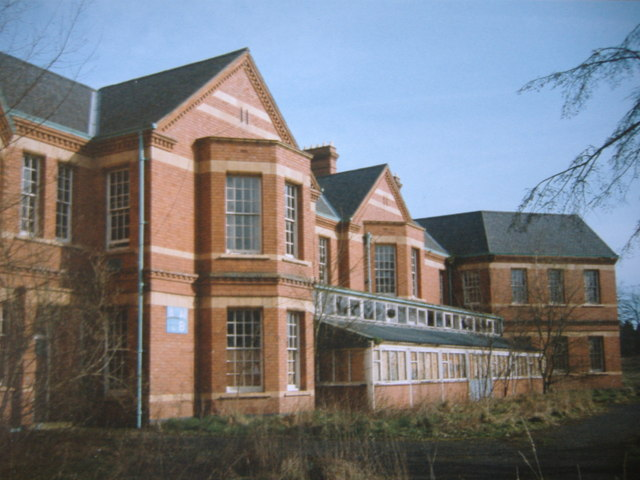
- Barnsley Hall Hospital in 1999 before demolition

- Shown in Worcestershire

Geography
- Location: Bromsgrove, Worcestershire, England, United Kingdom
- Coordinates: 52.351676°N 2.05888°W

Organisation
- Care system: Public NHS
- Type: Psychiatric

Services
- Beds: 1,200 (approx.)

History
- Founded: 1907
- Closed: 1996

Links
- Lists: Hospitals in England

Barnsley Hall Hospital was a psychiatric facility located in Bromsgrove, Worcestershire.

== History ==
The hospital was based on a 324-acre (131 ha) site purchased by the County Council in 1899. It was designed by George Thomas Hine and opened in 1907, to relieve pressure on the county's only existing asylum, Powick Hospital near Malvern and to serve the northern part of the county. It was used as a military hospital during the First World War. By 1929, it had become known as Worcestershire Mental Hospital and had reached its capacity of around 720 patients. It was used as a military hospital again during the Second World War. It joined the National Health Service as Barnsley Hall Mental Hospital in 1948 and became Barnsley Hall Hospital for Nervous and Mental Diseases in 1949. Additional buildings increased its capacity to about 1,200. It provided a continuation of psychiatric care after the Powick Hospital closed in 1989 and closed itself in 1996.

Originally reserved as an Area of Development Restraint following the closure of the hospital, the land has been replaced by residential development as part of a drive to sell off NHS property in order to increase national housing stock in conjunction with a government plan to construct housing at affordable rents, while the sale would boost the NHS funds. After closure, only the administration block, part of the original complex designed by architect George Thomas Hine, an airing court shelter, and the porter's lodge, were retained. Attempts to get its landmark water tower listed failed and it was finally demolished in 2000. The airing court shelter was moved to Avoncroft Museum in 2012.

== See also ==
- Healthcare in Worcestershire
- List of hospitals in England
