= Cherry Knowle Hospital =

- South of Tyne and Wearside Mental Health NHS Trust
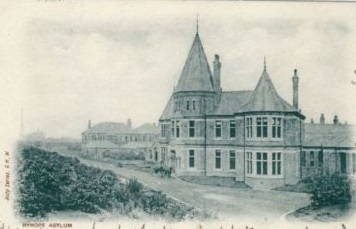
- Cherry Knowle Hospital

- Shown in Tyne and Wear

Geography
- Location: Ryhope, Tyne and Wear, England
- Coordinates: 54.8603°N 1.3732°W

Organisation
- Care system: NHS
- Type: Specialist

Services
- Emergency department: N/A
- Speciality: Psychiatric Hospital

History
- Founded: 1895
- Closed: 1998

Links
- Lists: Hospitals in England

Cherry Knowle Hospital was a mental health facility in Ryhope, Tyne and Wear, England. It was managed by the South of Tyne and Wearside Mental Health NHS Trust.

== History ==
The hospital was designed by George Thomas Hine using a Compact Arrow layout and construction began in 1893. It was opened as the Sunderland Borough Asylum in 1895. A villa block was added in 1902. Further development took place in the 1930s when an admissions hospital and convalescent villas were built.

During the Second World War emergency medical service huts were established on the site: these were later developed to create Ryhope General hospital.

The asylum joined the National Health Service as Cherry Knowle Hospital in 1948. After the introduction of Care in the Community in the early 1980s, the hospital went into a period of decline and closed in 1998. The buildings were largely demolished in 2011 and the site is being redeveloped for residential use.

The Hopewood Park mental health campus opened on the site in 2014.
