= Moorhaven Hospital =

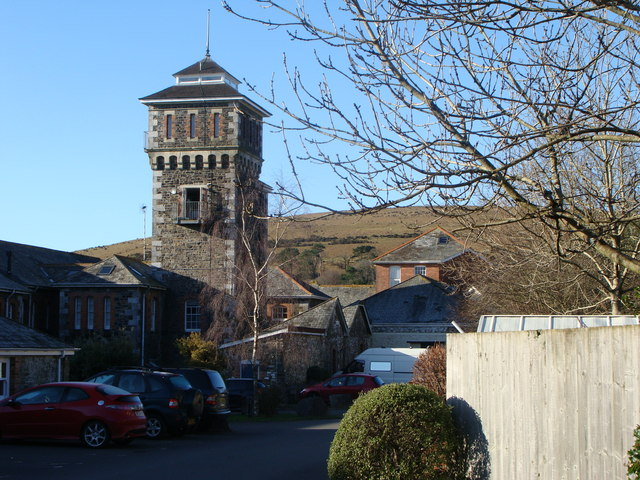
- Moorhaven Hospital

- Shown in Devon

Geography
- Location: Ivybridge, Devon, England
- Coordinates: 50.4013°N 3.8806°W

Organisation
- Care system: NHS
- Type: Specialist

Services
- Emergency department: N/A
- Speciality: Psychiatric Hospital

History
- Founded: 1891
- Closed: 1993

Links
- Lists: Hospitals in England

Moorhaven Hospital, built as Plymouth Asylum and initially named the Plymouth Borough Asylum, was a mental health facility in Ivybridge, Devon, England.

== History ==
Work on Plymouth Asylum was commenced in 1888, to a design by James Hine and Odgers of Plymouth using a stepped corridor layout. The asylum was designed to cater for 200 patients, although in anticipation of future extension the administrative portion of the building was adapted for a larger number. It was erected on a commanding site in the parish of Ugborough, on the borders of Dartmoor. Stone for the building was quarried on the estate, and the masonry dressings are of limestone, brick, Portland and Bath stone. The chapel is in the Early Englishstyle. The contracted price for the asylum was £34,514; Pethick Brothers, of Plymouth acted as contractors. The Mayor, Alderman Waring, Chairman of the Plymouth Justices, laid the foundation stone in 1888. The hospital was opened as the Plymouth Borough Asylum in October 1891.

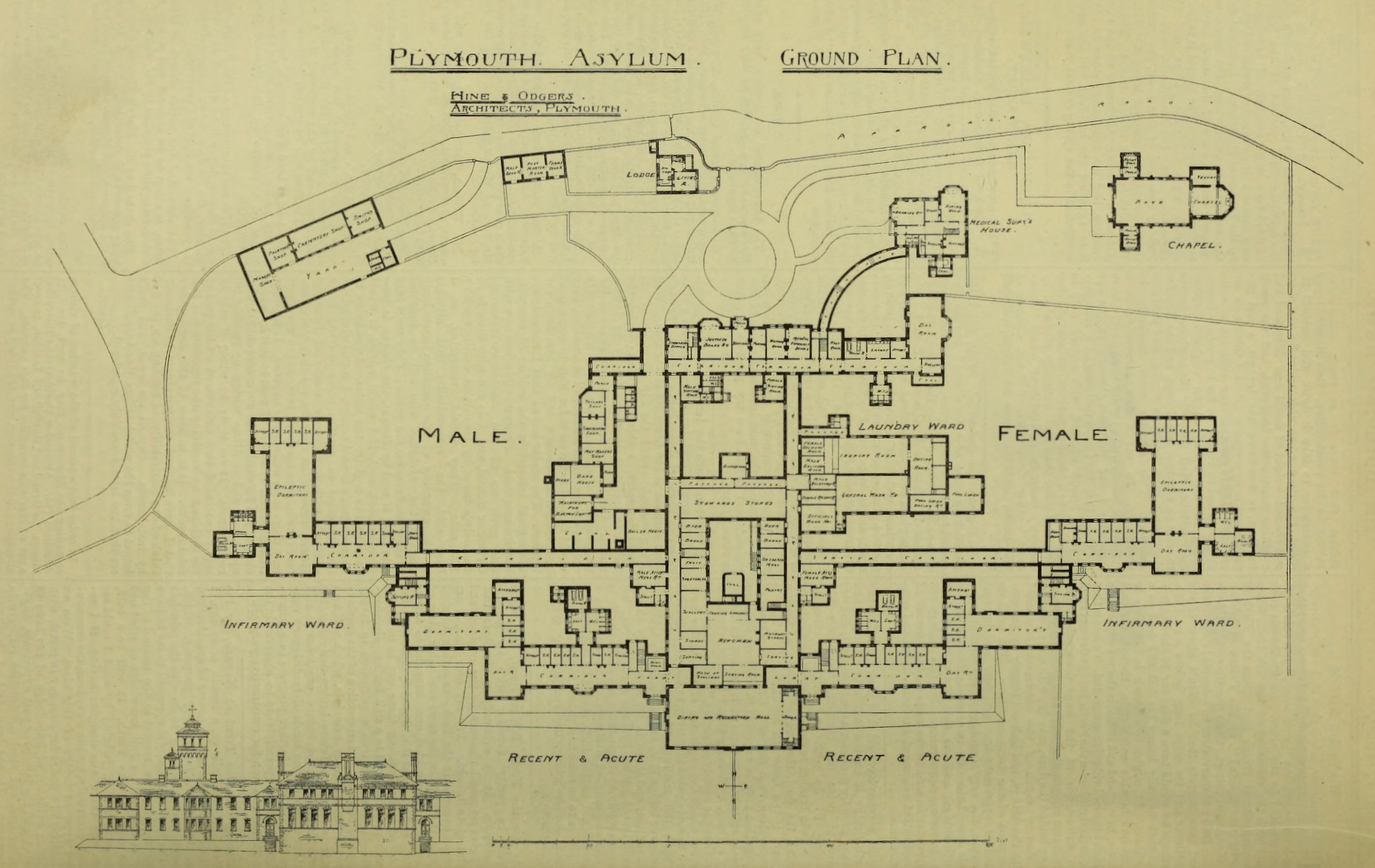
Plymouth Asylum floor plan in 1890

Situated at 650 feet (200 m) above sea level, its patients enjoyed excellent views down to the sea below. An additional storey was added to the building in 1908. It became Plymouth Mental Hospital in 1918 and joined the National Health Service as Moorhaven Hospital in 1948.

After the introduction of Care in the Community in the early 1980s, the hospital went into a period of decline and closed in February 1993. The buildings were subsequently converted into residential accommodation as Moorhaven Village.
