= Herrison Hospital =

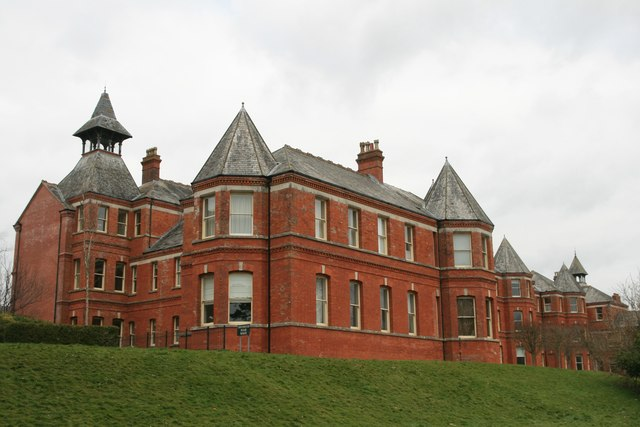
- Herrison House (previously a private asylum for fee paying patients)

- Shown in Dorset

Geography
- Location: Charlton Down, Dorset, England
- Coordinates: 50.7511°N 2.4590°W

Organisation
- Care system: NHS
- Type: Specialist

Services
- Emergency department: N/A
- Speciality: Psychiatric Hospital

History
- Founded: 1863
- Closed: 1992

Links
- Lists: Hospitals in England

Herrison Hospital was a mental health facility in Charlton Down, Dorset.

== History ==
The hospital, which was designed by Henry Edward Kendall Jr. using a Corridor Plan layout, opened as the Dorset County Asylum in 1863. From 1870 to 1880 further wards were added; named the Toller, Radipole, Bourne and Hillfield Wards these made up the Bourne Unit. The fireplaces in these wards were decorated with Minton Hollins picture tiles designed by artist John Moyr Smith. The tiles depict nursery rhymes, farmyard scenes, Shakespearean scenes, Aesop’s fables, animals, birds, flowers, hunting and racing scenes and flowers.

A female annex, designed by George Thomas Hine, was added in 1896 and a private asylum for fee paying patients, known as Herrison House and also designed by Hine, was added in 1904. The facility became the Dorset County Mental Hospital in 1920 and Herrison Hospital in 1940 before joining the National Health Service in 1948.

After the introduction of Care in the Community in the early 1980s, the hospital went into a period of decline and closed in January 1992. The site was subsequently developed for residential use as Charlton Down. Three of the larger buildings — Redwood (the main structure built in 1863), Greenwood (the female annex built in 1896) and Herrison House (the private asylum built in 1904) — have been converted into apartments.

== Notable staff ==
- John Greene, nurse
