= Whitecroft Hospital =

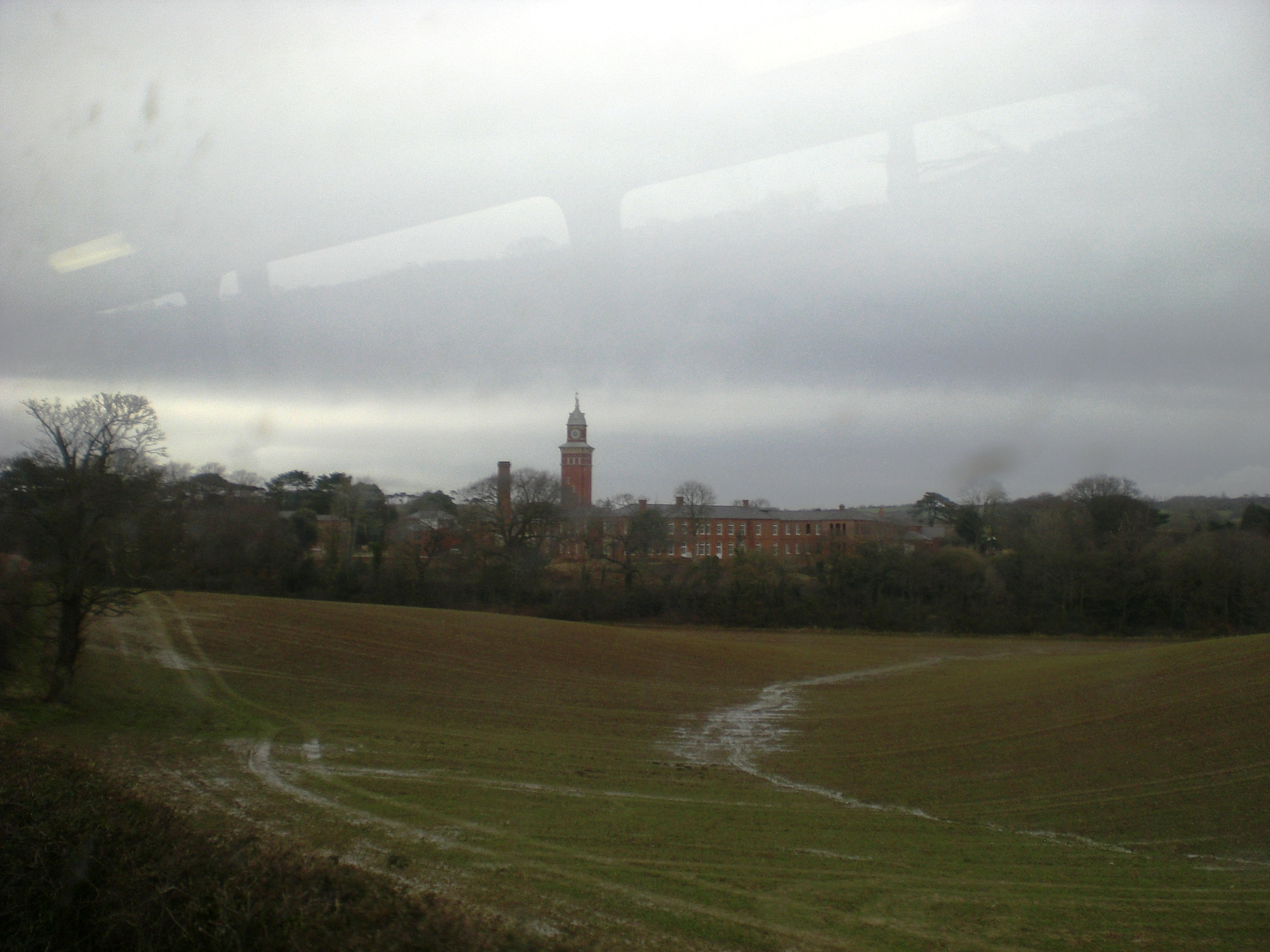
- Whitecroft Hospital

- Shown on the Isle of Wight

Geography
- Location: Gatcombe, Isle of Wight, England
- Coordinates: 50.6723°N 1.3023°W

Organisation
- Care system: National Health Service
- Type: Psychiatric

History
- Founded: 3 July 1896
- Closed: 1992

Whitecroft Hospital was a mental health facility near to Gatcombe on the Isle of Wight, England. The clock tower is a Grade II listed building.

== History ==
The hospital, which was designed by Benjamin Jacobs using a compact arrow layout, opened as the Isle of Wight County Asylum in July 1896. It became the Isle of Wight Mental Hospital in the 1920s and joined the National Health Service as Whitecroft Hospital in 1948. After the introduction of Care in the Community in the early 1980s, the hospital went into a period of decline and closed in 1992. The site was subsequently redeveloped for residential use as "Gatcombe Manor".

== Reported Hauntings ==
Whitecroft Hospital, like many other locations on the Isle of Wight, is said to be haunted by a number of ghosts. This includes former doctors and nurses who are said to wander around the property as if the hospital is still open for business. The former hospital is considered one of the most haunted hospitals in the country.
