= Horton =

Horton may refer to:

== Places ==
=== Antarctica ===
- Horton Glacier, Adelaide Island, Antarctica
- Horton Ledge, Queen Elizabeth Land, Antarctica

=== Australia ===
- Horton, Queensland, a town and locality in the Bundaberg Region
- Horton River (Australia), in northern New South Wales

=== Canada ===
- Horton, Ontario, a township
- Horton River (Canada), a tributary of the Beaufort Sea
- Horton Township, Nova Scotia, an 18th-century township - see Wolfville

=== United Kingdom ===
- Horton Beach, Port Eynon Bay, Wales
- Horton, Berkshire, a village and civil parish
- Horton, Buckinghamshire, a hamlet of Ivinghoe
- Horton, Cheshire, a village and former civil parish
- Horton, Dorset, a village and civil parish
- Horton, Gloucestershire, a village
- Horton, Lancashire, a village and civil parish
- Horton, Northamptonshire, a village
- Horton, Blyth, Northumberland, a village
- Horton, Chatton, a pair of small settlements: West Horton and East Horton, Northumberland
  - Horton Moor, located north of the settlements
- Horton, Hadley, a location in Shropshire
- Horton, Wem, a location in Shropshire
- Horton, Somerset, a village and civil parish
- Horton, Staffordshire, a village and civil parish
- Horton, Swansea, a village
- Horton, Wiltshire, a hamlet/locality in Bishops Cannings
- Horton, Surrey, a semi-rural area in the west of Epsom, Surrey
  - Horton Country Park, a local nature reserve
- Horton in Ribblesdale, North Yorkshire
- Horton Park, Bradford, West Yorkshire, a public park
- Horton-cum-Studley, Oxfordshire, near Oakley, Buckinghamshire

=== United States ===
- Horton, Alabama, an unincorporated town
- Horton, Iowa, an unincorporated community
- Horton, Kansas, a city
- Horton, Minnesota, an unincorporated community
- Horton, Oregon, an unincorporated community
- Horton, Howell County, Missouri, an unincorporated community
- Horton, Vernon County, Missouri, an unincorporated community
- Horton, West Virginia, an unincorporated community
- Horton Creek (Arizona)
- Horton Park (Saint Paul, Minnesota), a small arboretum
- Horton Peak, White Cloud Mountains, Idaho
- Horton Town, Missouri, an unincorporated community in Washington County
- Horton Township (disambiguation)

=== Elsewhere ===
- 21527 Horton, an asteroid
- Horton Plains, Sri Lanka, see Horton Plains National Park

== People and fictional characters ==
- Horton (given name)
- Horton (surname)

== Historic structures ==
- Horton Gristmill, Malone, New York, on the National Register of Historic Places
- Horton House, Jekyll Island, Georgia, on the US National Register of Historic Places
- Horton Priory, Horton, Dorset, England

== Hospitals ==
- Horton General Hospital, a National Health Service-run hospital, Banbury, Oxfordshire, England
- Horton Hospital, a large psychiatric hospital in Epsom, Surrey, England, which closed in 1997

== Other uses ==
- Horton baronets, an extinct title in the Baronetage of Great Britain
- Horton Fieldhouse, an indoor athletics facility on the campus of Illinois State University in Normal, Illinois
- Horton Light Railway, Surrey, England

== See also ==
- Great Horton, Bradford, West Yorkshire
- Little Horton, Bradford, West Yorkshire
- Horton's syndrome, also known as cluster headache
- Horten (disambiguation)
- Hortonia (disambiguation)
- Hortonville (disambiguation)
