= Horten (disambiguation) =

Horten is a municipality in Norway. Horten may also refer to:

== Places ==
- Horten (town), a town within Horten Municipality
- Horten Church, a church in Horten Municipality
- Horten Peak, a small rock peak in Queen Maud Land, Antarctica

== People ==
- Horten brothers, Walter (1913–1998) and Reimar (1915–1994), German aircraft designers and World War II pilots
- Heidi Horten (1941–2022), Austrian billionaire art collector and wife of Helmut Horten
- Helmut Horten (1909–1987), German entrepreneur
- Sofie Horten (1848–1927), Danish journalist

== Ships ==
- HNoMS Horten (1965), formerly HMCS Prestonian, a Canadian frigate transferred to the Royal Norwegian Navy and renamed
- HNoMS Horten (A530), a Royal Norwegian Navy support vessel
- HMT Horten, a trawler - see List of requisitioned trawlers of the Royal Navy (WWII)

== Railway-related ==
- Horten Line, a former railway line connecting Skoppum to Horten, Norway
- Horten Station (1881), a former railway station in Horten, Norway (closed 1967)
- Horten Station, a railway station under construction in Horten, Norway (planned to open in 2025)

== Fictional characters ==
- Odd Horten, protagonist of the 2007 film O' Horten
- Horten Spence, a DC Comics character
- Horten, a starship's artificial intelligence in Hypernauts, an American children's television series

== Other uses ==
- Horten AG, a German department store chain founded by Helmut Horten

== See also ==
- Horton (disambiguation)
- Battle of Horten Harbour
