= Hortonia =

Hortonia may refer to:

== Places ==
=== United States ===
- Hortonia, Vermont
- Hortonia, Wisconsin

== Plants ==
- Hortonia, a genus including the following species:
  - H. angustifolia
  - H. floribunda
  - H. ovalifolia

== See also ==
- Horton (disambiguation)
- Hortonville (disambiguation)
