= Horton Light Railway =

Railway line in Surrey, England

Coordinates: 51.3479°N 0.2964°W

The Horton Light Railway had its origins in a contractor's line (the Ewell and Long Grove Railway) built in 1905 to transport building materials, coal and other supplies for London County Council's Epsom Cluster of psychiatric hospitals in the Horton area to the North-West of the town of Epsom. The authorisation of the railway did not permit the carriage of passengers. The railway connected with the mainline network just south of Ewell West railway station.

== Hospital construction ==
London County Council (LCC) bought the Horton Estate in November 1896 to build a cluster of new psychiatric hospitals. It was realised that getting the building materials to the sites from Epsom railway station would damage the roads, and so a light railway was proposed. After protracted negotiations the line was approved by the London County Council (General Powers) Act 1899 (62 & 63 Vict. c. ccxxxvii) which received royal assent in August 1899. Meanwhile, contractors were charged a levy for loads, with a higher charge for traction engine than for horse and cart, but the traction engine was still favoured and road damage ensued. The railway was held back by the available budget, and by 1903 Manor Asylum, Horton Asylum, the associated power station and the Ewell Epileptic Colony (later known as St Ebba's) had all been completed. Work was about to begin on the large Long Grove Hospital, and the issue of road damage got worse. In 1904 LCC decided to issue an umbrella contract, and this enabled the contractor to lay a railway. When the contract was given to Foster & Dicksee of Rugby in October 1904, the way was clear to build the railway, which was to be known as the Ewell and Long Grove Railway.

== Ewell and Long Grove Railway (1905-1907) ==
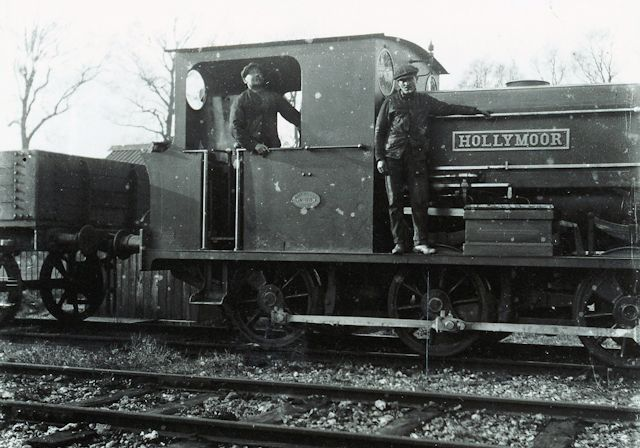
Manning Wardle 0-6-0 saddle tank locomotive "Hollymoor"

The required 41 acres (17 hectares) of land were bought in late 1904, and work started on the railway in January 1905. The connection and exchange sidings with the London and South Western Railway (LSWR) were completed in April 1905. Locomotive "Hollymoor" was delivered and using materials delivered by rail and a very large workforce, the railway was completed by June 1905. As a freight only railway, light gauge rails and permanent way were adopted, and rather than have run round loops (except at the exchange sidings) the locomotives would propel the loaded wagons. With the completion of the railway a second locomotive arrived, No 947, and work commenced on Long Grove Asylum.

In 1906, a local woman, Mary Tobin, was run down and killed on a level crossing. The loco was propelling 12 trucks, and the lookout who should have been on the first truck, was on the fifth as the first four were sheeted over. The gates had been left open. Foster & Dicksee were found guilty of neglect. This resulted in a modification being made to the railway crossing gate, it also required a lookout to stand in the road with a red flag from that point onwards, and 4 mph (6.4 km/h) limit on crossings, with the police to ensure the regulations were obeyed.

The Long Grove Asylum was completed on time and was opened in mid-1907, after which the line was not used, and under the terms imposed by the local authority the lines were to be lifted at the three level crossings by 24 July 1908. Foster & Dicksee were in discussions with London County Council about retaining the line, but the local authority was not happy with Foster & Dicksee operating it, and eventually lifted the rails at the level crossings and sent Foster & Dicksee the bill.

=== Locomotives ===
Name/Number	Type	Maker	Dates	Notes
Hollymoor	0-6-0ST	Manning Wardle 1519 of 1901	1905-1908	Had worked on building Hollymoor Hospital near Birmingham. May have returned 1918-1919
No 947	0-4-0ST	Peckett and Sons, 947 of 1902	1905-1909	Ex Stirchley Iron Co Ltd, then Peckett. Sold by auction from the site 1909, later at Rugby Portland Cement Company

== The Horton Light Railway (1913-1950) ==
The construction of the fifth institution, "West Park" was planned in October 1908, but Foster & Dicksee was blocked by the local authority from operating the railway. The solution was that the railway was sold to London County Council so that they could build a permanent line allowing coal to be hauled to the power station at a considerable saving and benefit to the local roads. The line was sold to LCC "as is", and they inserted a clause in the London County Council (General Powers) Act 1909 (9 Edw. 7. c. cxxx) allowing them to build the line, which included an extension to West Park, a siding to the power station, re-routing in various places, and the elimination of all level crossings by footbridges, and by a cutting under Hook Road. Work was delayed by budgetary constraints, but eventually started in early 1912. Other changes to the original contractor's railway included extra exchange sidings with a weighbridge, relocation of the engine shed nearer to the power station, and run-round loops just before each branch (as there was insufficient space at the end of the branches). The new light railway was completed in May 1913 (including removal of the remains of the Ewell & Long Grove Railway).

When war broke out, West Park had not been completed, and work on it was suspended. It was finally completed in 1921 along with the branch line serving it, complete with water tower and goods shed. West Park was officially opened in 1924.

The end of the 1920s was peak time for the railway, which moved 15,000 tons of coal and 4,000 tons of general goods per year. In the 1930s road transport was improving for general deliveries, and the connection of Epsom to the National Grid meant the power station which needed maintenance was no longer needed; it was closed down in 1935. During the Second World War, a rail-mounted anti-aircraft gun was used on the line and the track was damaged in three places by bombing. On its formation in 1948, the National Health Service took over the railway. The line closed in 1950. The track was lifted and shipped to Lagos for reuse on a railway in Nigeria. The connection between the Raynes Park-Epsom line and the Horton Light Railway was removed in September 1953.

=== Locomotives ===
Name	Type	Maker	Dates	Notes
Crossness	0-4-0ST	Andrew Barclay 994 of 1904	1913–35	From Southern Outfall improvement scheme based at Abbey Wood, cut up 1935
Hendon	0-6-0ST	Manning Wardle 2046 of 1926	1935–47	Sold after the war
Sherwood	0-4-0ST	Robert Stephenson and Hawthorns Limited 7349 of 1947	1947–50	A poor steamer. Sold to Fred Watkins Engineering 1950

Once or twice locomotives were borrowed from the LSWR (and later the Southern Railway) when the local engine was under repair.

== The site today ==
The hospitals were shut down one by one, Long Grove closed in 1992, Manor Hospital was closed in 1994, Horton Hospital closed in 1997, West Park Hospital in 2002, St Ebba's Hospital is largely closed but retains a small therapy suite. Most of the buildings have either been demolished, or in some cases converted to modern accommodation. The trackbed is now used as a walking and riding path through Horton Country Park.

== Bibliography ==
- Essen, R.I. (1991). Epsom's Hospital Railway. Epsom: Pullingers. ISBN 978-0-90-242403-6.
- Jackson, Alan A. (1999). The railway in Surrey. Penryn: Atlantic Transport Publishers. ISBN 978-0-90-689990-8.
- Mitchell, Vic; Smith, Keith (1995). Wimbledon to Epsom : including the Chessington branch. Midhurst: Middleton Press. ISBN 978-1-87-379362-6.
