= Manor Hospital =

Manor Hospital my refer to:

- Manor Hospital, Epsom
- Acland Hospital, Oxford
- Walsall Manor Hospital
