= Long Grove Hospital =

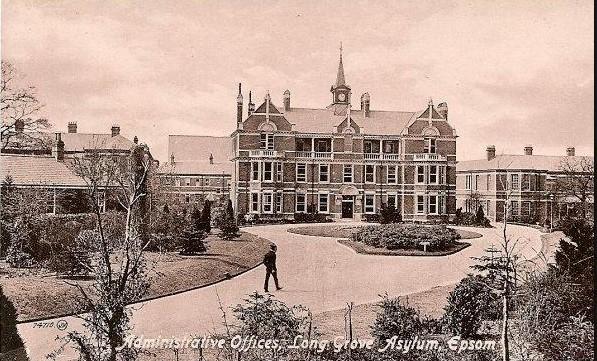
- Long Grove Asylum

- Shown in Surrey

Geography
- Location: Epsom
- Coordinates: 51.3494°N 0.2901°W

Organisation
- Care system: Public NHS
- Type: Mental health

History
- Founded: 1907
- Closed: 1992

Long Grove Hospital, formerly Long Grove Asylum, was a mental hospital, part of the Epsom Cluster of hospitals in the Horton area of Epsom, Surrey in the United Kingdom.

== History ==
=== Construction ===
The hospital was commissioned by the London County Council and was the fourth institution of the Epsom Cluster of Hospitals. It was designed by George Thomas Hine; re-use of existing plans from other asylums allowed the council to pass the plans through the development stage and approval by the Commissioners in Lunacy faster than a new plan.

At the peak of construction activity on the Long Grove site in 1905 the building contractor, Forster & Dicksee, employed about 1,100 men, around 900 of them recruited from the London unemployed and brought down from Waterloo daily in special trains, half their 4 shilling (20 pence) return fare being at the contractor's expense. The Horton Light Railway was constructed to transport building materials to the site and was later used to transport hospital supplies to Long Grove and the other hospitals on the estate. The facility opened as Long Grove Asylum in 1907.

The central axis of service buildings included the administration block, recreation hall with flanking male and female staff blocks, kitchens and main store. As usual for the time, gender-specific workplaces such as the laundry, workshops and boiler house were located on the side corresponding to their respective workforces. A large arc of corridor linked all wards, with radiating corridors making the entire main complex easily accessible. Parole and infirmary blocks were situated within the grounds, as was a detached chapel, senior staff and official's housing and an isolation hospital.

=== Mental health facility ===
Between 1907 and 1992 at least 43 female typhoid carriers were held at Long Grove in a secure isolation unit without parole. All of the women came from the London area and despite having recovered from the disease were deemed a public health risk as they still hosted and excreted the bacteria. Hospital staff were made to undergo decontamination on entering and leaving the ward and wore masks and surgical gowns at all times. All toilets in the unit were flushed using boiling water to minimise the risk of infection. It is believed that the women were detained even after the advent of antibiotic treatments in the 1950s, due to the state of their mental health, which may have deteriorated partly as a result of their incarceration. The unit was the subject of a BBC investigation in 2008 which alleged that carriers were kept unnecessarily in "prison-like conditions".

The facility became Long Grove Mental Hospital in 1918 and Long Grove Hospital in 1937. It joined the National Health Service in 1948.

Former patients of the hospital include George Pelham (a man who survived the sinking of two ships, including the RMS Titanic) in 1939, Josef Hassid (a Polish violin prodigy) in 1943 and Ronnie Kray (one of the Kray twins) in 1957.

=== Decline and redevelopment ===
After the introduction of Care in the Community in the 1980s the hospital reduced in size and closed in 1992. Most of the buildings were subsequently demolished. Those which were retained were converted into apartments and incorporated into Clarendon Park, a new development of houses and flats. Parts of the surrounding landscaped grounds have been preserved and now form part of Horton Country Park.

== See also ==
- Horton, Surrey
- Horton Light Railway
- Epsom Cluster
