= Horton Park =

Horton Park may refer to:

- Horton Park, Blenheim, a cricket ground in Blenheim, New Zealand
- Horton Park, Bradford, a park in Bradford, West Yorkshire
  - Horton Park Avenue, a street in Bradford, West Yorkshire, the location of the Park Avenue ground
  - Horton Park railway station, a former station in Bradford, West Yorkshire
- Horton Park Golf Club, a golf club on the Sunshine Coast, Queensland
- Horton Park (Saint Paul, Minnesota), an arboretum in Saint Paul, Minnesota
