= St Ebba's Hospital =

St. Ebba's Hospital
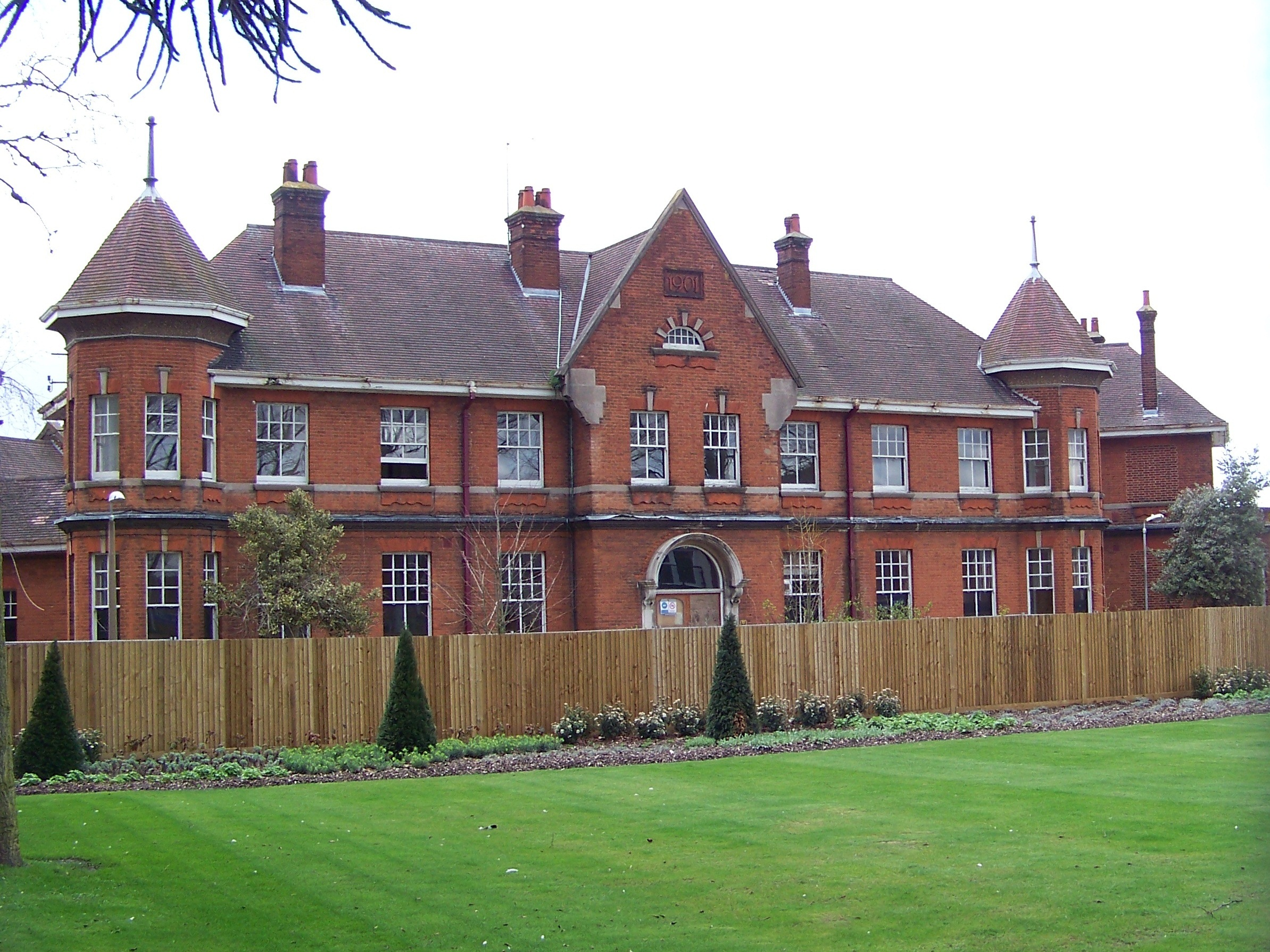
- St. Ebba's former administration block standing empty awaiting conversion in 2010

- Shown in Surrey

Geography
- Location: Epsom
- Coordinates: 51.349°N 0.274°W

Organisation
- Care system: Public NHS
- Type: Mental health

History
- Founded: 1904

St Ebba's Hospital formerly Ewell Epileptic Colony (1904–1918) and later Ewell Mental Hospital (1927–1938) is a mental handicap and former psychiatric hospital near Epsom in the county of Surrey, England.

== History ==
=== Construction ===
St. Ebba's was the third hospital to be built within the Epsom Cluster, opening in 1904. The colony was designed for the London County Council by William C. Clifford Smith and constructed at a cost of £98,000 to house a total of 326 epileptic patients, 60 of whom were female. The hospital consisted of eight free-standing villas housing 38 patients each centred on a central block containing administrative offices, a recreation hall and other hospital services as well as a 32-bed admission ward for female patients.

=== Epileptic colony ===
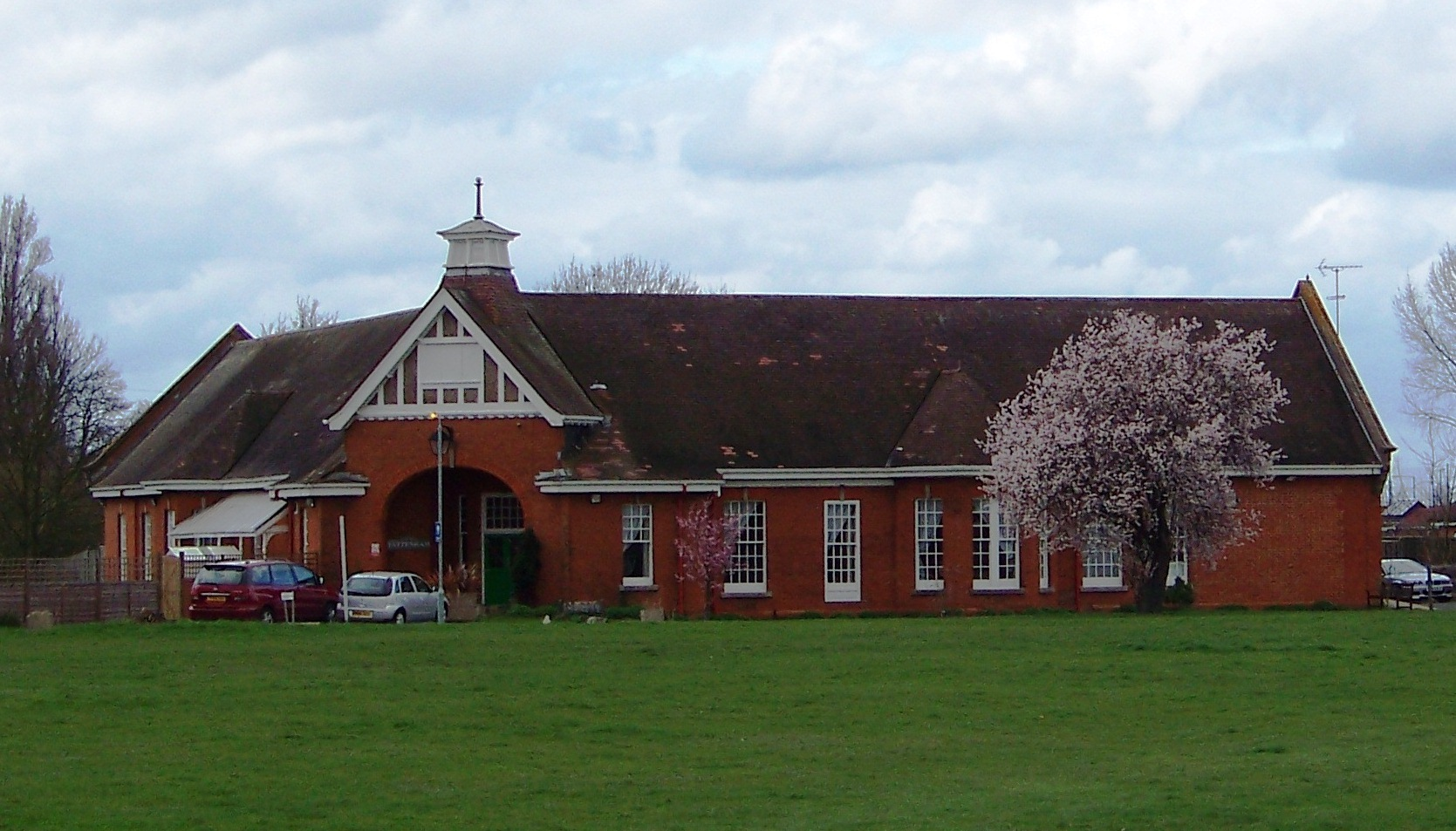
Thorn Villa, one of the wards remaining open in 2010.

In the hospital's first year 315 patients were admitted, 25% of whom had attempted suicide at one time. Nearly 50% were regarded as of faulty heredity. A well-defined history of head injury or severe falls was found in 14% and a further 14% had arteriosclerosis. Patients received regular treatment including doses of bromide of strontium and a specially regulated diet. By the end of the year 17 of the 315 patients had died.

In 1918 the hospital became the Ewell War Hospital for treating neurasthenic ex-servicemen returning from the First World War, administered by the Ministry of Pensions.

=== Psychiatric hospital ===
In 1927 the hospital was returned to the LCC for use as a mental hospital. It was renamed the Ewell Mental Hospital and under the Mental Treatment Act 1930, became one of the first ever voluntary admission public mental hospitals. The LCC made special provision for patients with acute or recent illnesses to be admitted on a voluntary basis for no more than two years before being transferred elsewhere. Medical students from various London teaching hospitals attended the hospital on rotation, while consultant staff from the hospital held out-patient clinics in London. The Hospital also established a working relationship with nearby HMP Wandsworth, providing treatment to prisoners with mental health problems when necessary.

Between 1935 and 1938 the hospital was expanded to provide 933 beds and in 1938 it was renamed St. Ebba's Hospital. By the late 1940s, some 95–97% of patients at the hospital had been admitted voluntarily and in 1948 the Hospital joined the National Health Service as part of the South West Metropolitan Regional Board. Unlike the other hospitals in the Epsom Cluster, patients continued to be admitted from all of the London Metropolitan Regions, except for the North West. In 1949 an adolescent unit was established for patients aged between 12–17 years and at the same time an occupational therapy department opened: Able-bodied patients worked in the laundry and workshops, while those too ill to leave the wards practised handicrafts. Patients could also attend discussion groups and classes in music appreciation, art, drama, dancing and dress-making or produce plays, make use of the social club or even contribute to 'Trees' the hospital's own weekly magazine.

=== Mental handicap hospital ===
In 1962, the hospital changed use to cater for intellectually disabled patients. Most of the psychiatric patients were sent to hospitals nearer their homes and the wards were renovated to provide 470 beds: 183 for the mentally ill and 287 for the mentally disabled. Later the remaining psychiatric patients were transferred to other hospitals and the Adolescent Unit moved to Long Grove Hospital. In 1969 an Industrial Training Unit opened in one of the villas which provided training in skills and handicrafts for 200 patients. A cement products factory opened in 1971 which employed patients to produce paving slabs in a variety of sizes and colours. By 1979 St. Ebba's Hospital had 629 beds, making it the largest hospital for the mentally handicapped in the district.

=== Decline and redevelopment ===
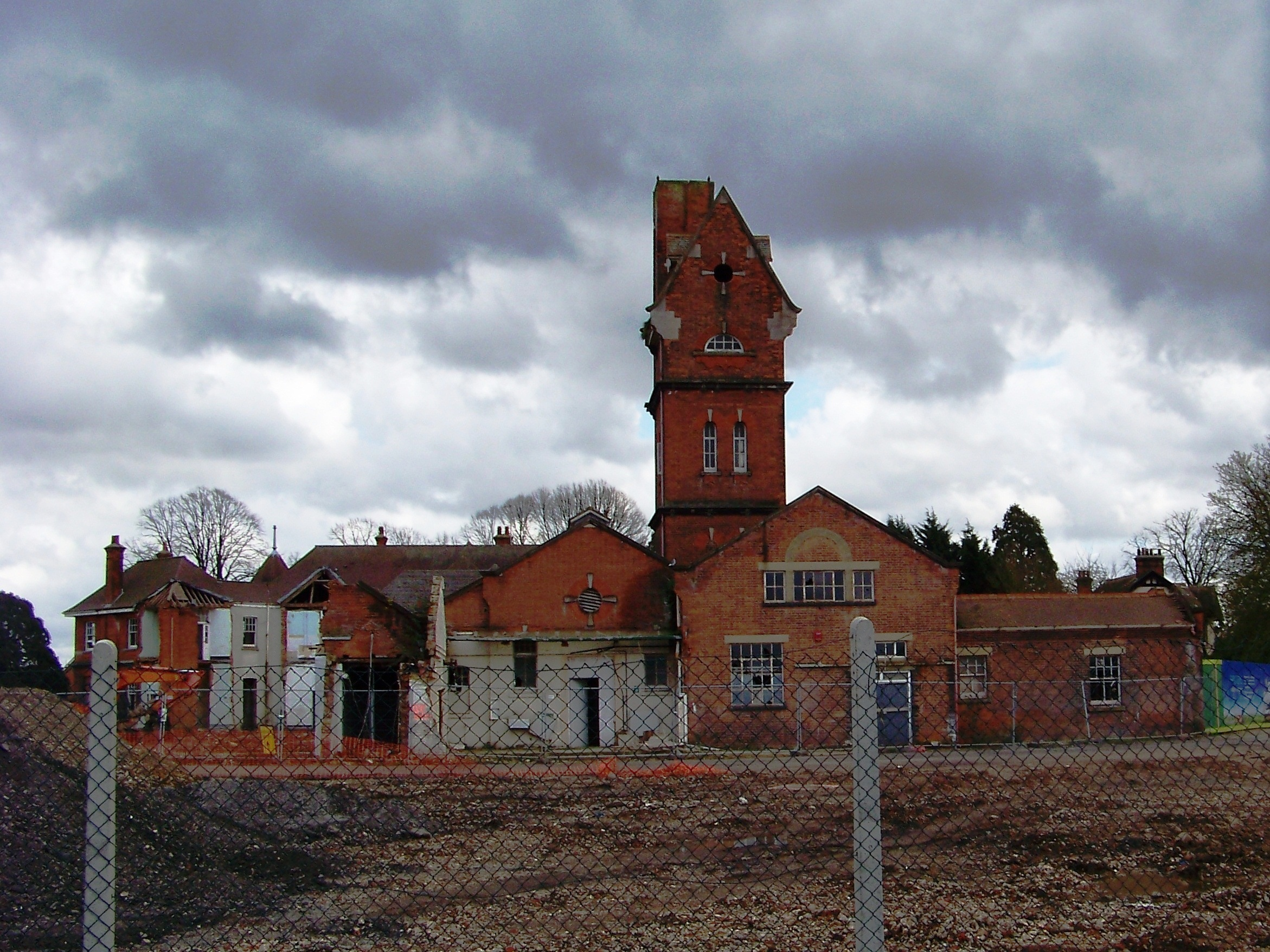
Service block and water tower during redevelopment in 2010.

By 1987 patient numbers were declining and a Parents and Relatives Group was formed to campaign for the retention of the site as a village for people with learning disabilities. By 1995 the Hospital had 484 beds and patients were being rehoused in community homes. In 2004 work began to convert and upgrade some of the old buildings for 55 long-stay handicapped patients. In 2008 a purpose-built Therapy Suite with a new hydrotherapy pool was opened by the Mayor of Epsom and Ewell. As of 2011, most of the hospital buildings were being redeveloped with only a small number of patients remaining on site.

== See also ==
- Horton, Surrey
- Epsom Cluster
