= Hortonville =

Hortonville may refer to:

- Hortonville, Nova Scotia
- Hortonville, Indiana
- Hortonville, Massachusetts
- Hortonville Historic District, Massachusetts
- Hortonville, New Mexico
- Hortonville, New York
- Hortonville, Vermont
- Hortonville, Wisconsin
- Hortonville Area School District, Wisconsin

== See also ==
- Horton (disambiguation)
- Hortonia (disambiguation)
