= Carinthia VII =

Lürssen Built Super Yacht

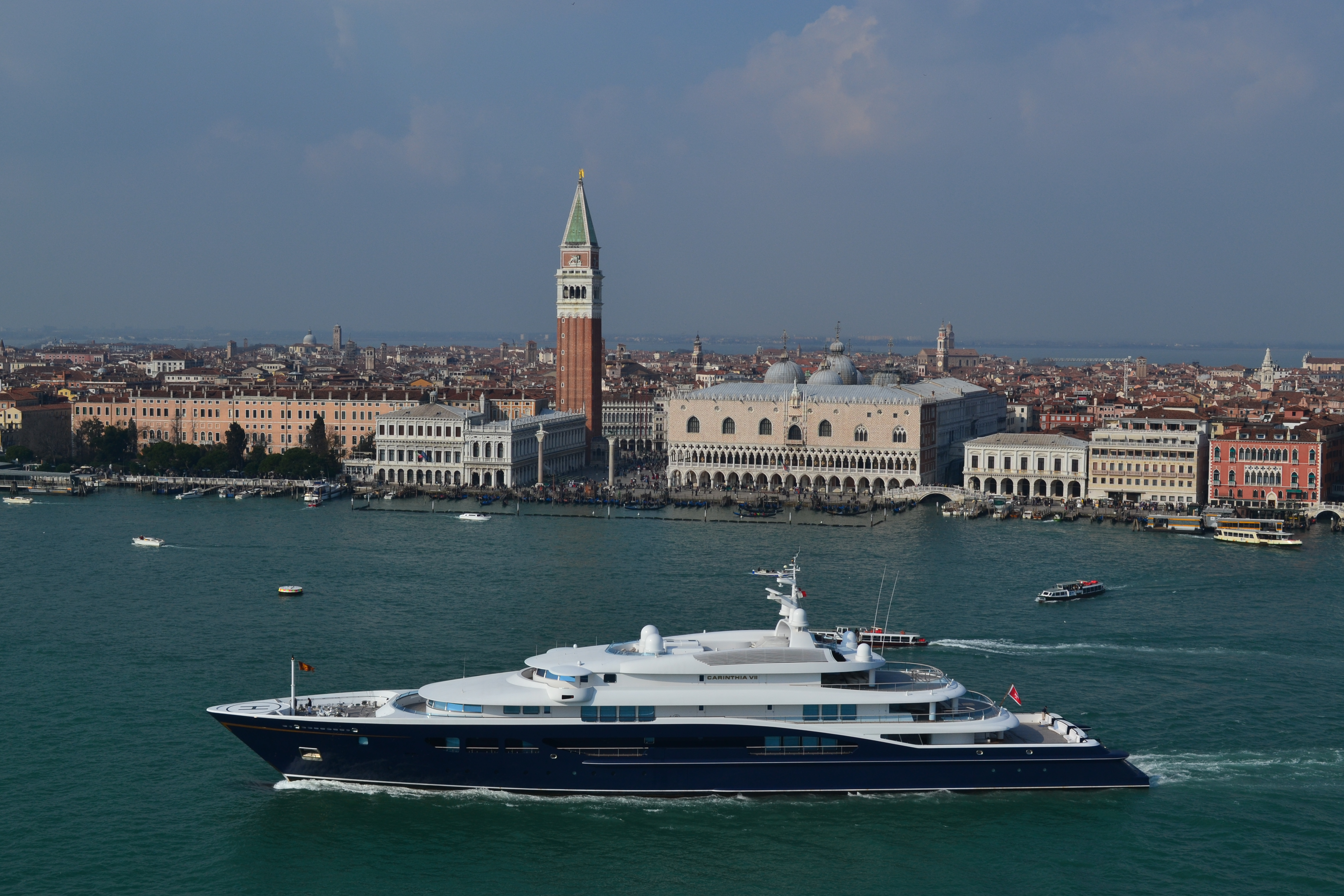
- Carinthia VII

History
- Name: Carinthia VII
- Owner: Rubén Cherñajovsky
- Port of registry: Marshall Islands
- Builder: Lürssen Yachts
- Yard number: 13618
- Launched: 21 November 2000
- Completed: 2002
- Identification: Call sign: 9HB3158; IMO number: 8994001; MMSI number: 229413000
- Status: Currently in service

General characteristics
- Class & type: yacht
- Tonnage: 3,643 GT
- Length: 318.25 ft (97.00 m)
- Beam: 52.50 ft (16.00 m)
- Draft: 15.75 ft (4.80 m)
- Propulsion: 4 × MTU 20V 1163 TB93 each 7.400kW (10.064 mHP) Diesels
- Speed: 26 knots (48 km/h; 30 mph) (maximum); 22 knots (cruising)
- Capacity: 12 passengers
- Crew: 32 crew members

The yacht Carinthia VII was built in the Lürssen Yachts yard in 2002 and refurbished in 2005. The vessel also underwent a major refit in 2023 which included multiple aesthetic and technical modernisations and was fully converted from private to charter.

One of the largest motor yachts in the world, it was owned by Heidi Horten, widow of the German entrepreneur Helmut Horten.

== Description ==
Manufactured with a steel superstructure, Carinthia VII has a length of 318.25 ft (97.20 m), beam of 52.50 ft (16.00 m), draft of 15.75 ft (4.80 m), and a tonnage of 3,643 GT. The twin screws are driven by four MTU 1163 diesel main engines, generating 39,700 bhp in total, enabling Carinthia VII to reach a maximum speed of 26 knots.

== History ==
Carinthia VII was commissioned from the Bremen shipyard Lürssen Yachts and designer Tim Heywood under the name "Project Fabergé" by the Austrian billionaire Heidi Horten. It initially sailed under the flag of Austria with a home port of Venice.

In April 2022, the yacht was put up for sale by Frasers for €120 million.

== Refit 2023 ==
After the sale in 2022, Carinthia VII underwent a 10-month refit at Lürssen's Blöhm + Voss refit facility in Hamburg, Germany in 2023.

The refit team included Bizzozero Cassina Architects who spearheaded the interior design and RYacht Management who oversaw project management.

The key alterations include the addition of a 11-metre pool on the aft deck and a brand new 85-square-metre gym on the bridge deck, which is half-encased by six tonnes of sliding glass panels that can be completely removed when required. In addition, the interior was completely modernised, the AV/IT system was fully upgraded and the yacht was equipped with zero-speed stabilisers. An 18.15 meter Windy SR60 2023 chase boat, T2 Carinthia VII, was also added alongside.

Carinthia VII also underwent technical modifications to convert her use from private to commercial and registered under the Marshall Islands flag.

== Charter ==
Carinthia VII is available for charter and is advertised at a rate of €1,500,000 per week by Fraser.

== Awards ==
Carinthia VII won Refit Yacht of the Year for 2023 in the Boat International Superyacht Awards in Venice, Italy.
