= West Park Hospital, Epsom =

West Park Hospital
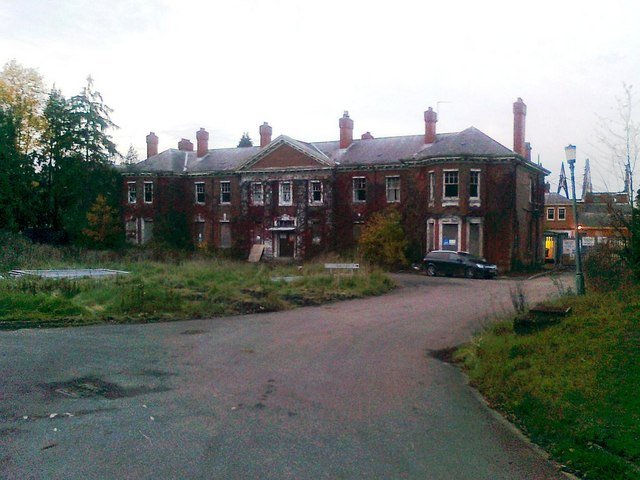
- Derelict Administration Building, West Park Hospital

- Shown in Surrey

Geography
- Location: Epsom
- Coordinates: 51.3388°N 0.3000°W

Organisation
- Care system: Public NHS
- Type: Mental health

History
- Founded: 1921
- Closed: 2003

West Park Hospital (sometimes erroneously referred to as West Park Asylum) was a large psychiatric hospital in Epsom, Surrey.

== History ==
=== Origins ===
The hospital seems to have been so-called because of its location to the west of the landscaped parkland formerly associated with Horton Manor (later the Manor Hospital). Although sometimes called an 'asylum' by urban explorers and the media, West Park was never officially termed as such, having opened as West Park Mental Hospital in 1923. The term had largely fallen out of favour by the 1920s and was made obsolete in law by the Mental Treatment Act 1930.

=== Design and construction ===
The hospital was designed by William C. Clifford-Smith (architect to the London County Council), who was also involved in the design of nearby St Ebba's and The Manor Hospitals. The hospital had been in planning since 1906, and by 1917 it was largely complete; however, the outbreak of war postponed opening until 1921. The hospital was the last great London mental hospital, and the last of the Epsom Cluster.

=== Operation ===
When complete the hospital could cater for around 2,000 patients of mixed class. The site had extensive boiler houses and plant rooms, a large laundry and a substantial water tower. There were also large kitchens located behind the canteen and a substantial recreation hall or ballroom (the latter suffered an arson attack on 30 September 2003 and is now a burnt out shell). The hospital was also once served by the Horton Estate's own railway but this was removed in 1950 and no trace remains except around the central engineering block.

=== Decline and redevelopment ===
The hospital was slowly run down from the mid-1990s, and by 2003 most of the hospital was closed and derelict, although some buildings, including the New Epsom and Ewell Cottage Hospital remain in use by NHS healthcare services. Because of its derelict state, it came to be of interest to urban explorers who were attracted by the sheer size of the buildings and also the many hospital items still in situ, such as beds, kitchen equipment and personal items. A padded cell also remained in-situ and was of considerable interest to explorers.

In November 2010, demolition began of the former hospital buildings. As of April 2011, most of the central buildings had been cleared with only a limited number of wards, the water tower and administration building being retained for conversion to apartments. These were retained in the Noble Park housing development which was completed in April 2012.

== Gallery ==
The burnt out remains of the Main Hall.

Honiton and Hereford ward, the upper floor gutted by a fire in 2003 which destroyed the roof.

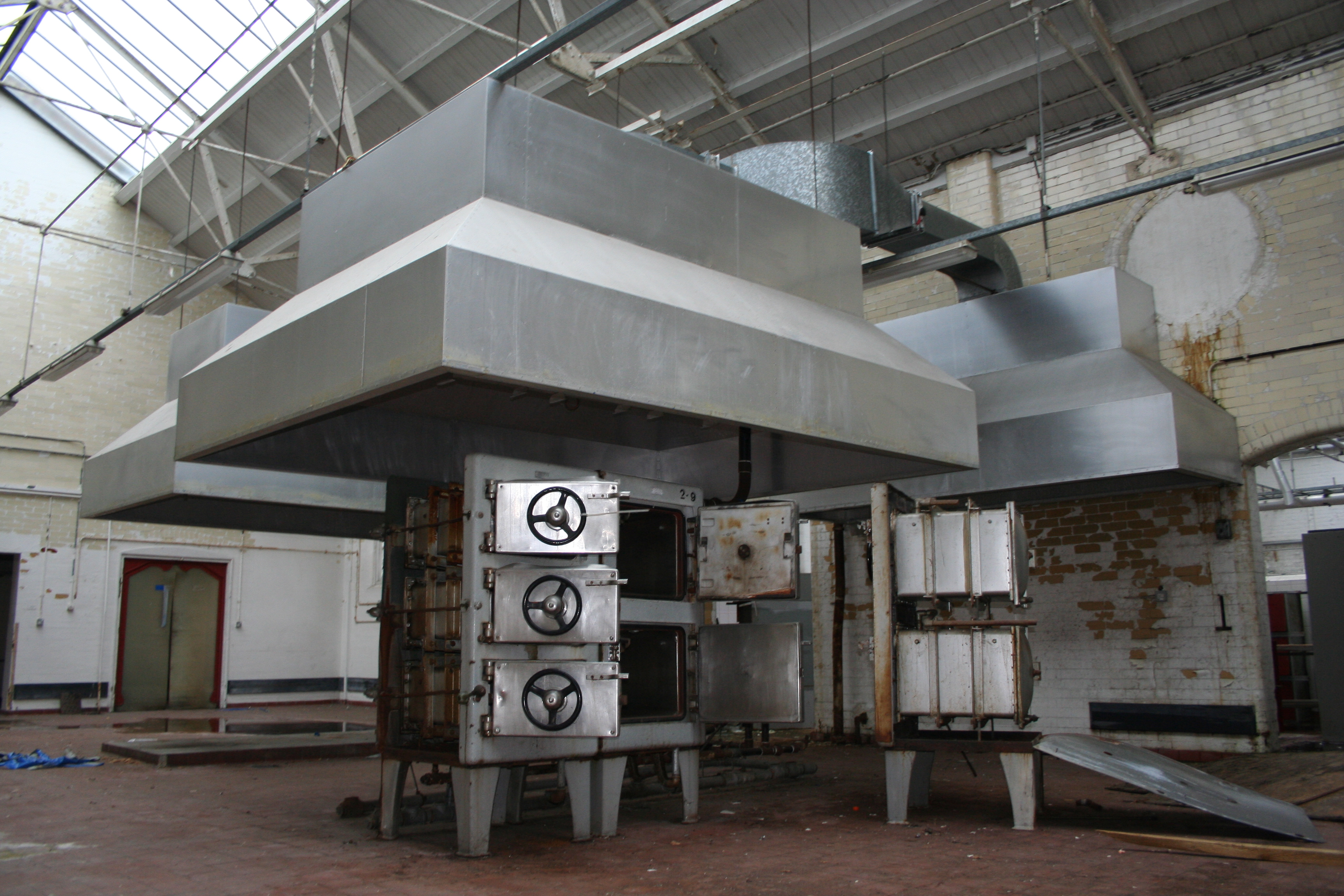
One of the large stainless-steel ovens in the hospital kitchens, still in-situ.

A chair in the dental clinic - the hospital had many clinics, including an opticians.

A bathroom within one of the wards close to the main hall, which is in a poor state.

A much-photographed store room in one of the older wards which contains hundreds of personal items.

Part of the extensive network of corridors and covered ways which connects wards to services.

The "Pocock Brothers" padded cell within an older ward is the hospital's most iconic feature.

A typical day room within one of the wards, with large bay windows make good use of the sunlight.

A bedroom within a ward, with beds still remaining.

== See also ==
- Horton Light Railway
- Epsom Cluster
