= Ewell West railway station =

Railway station in Surrey, England

Ewell West
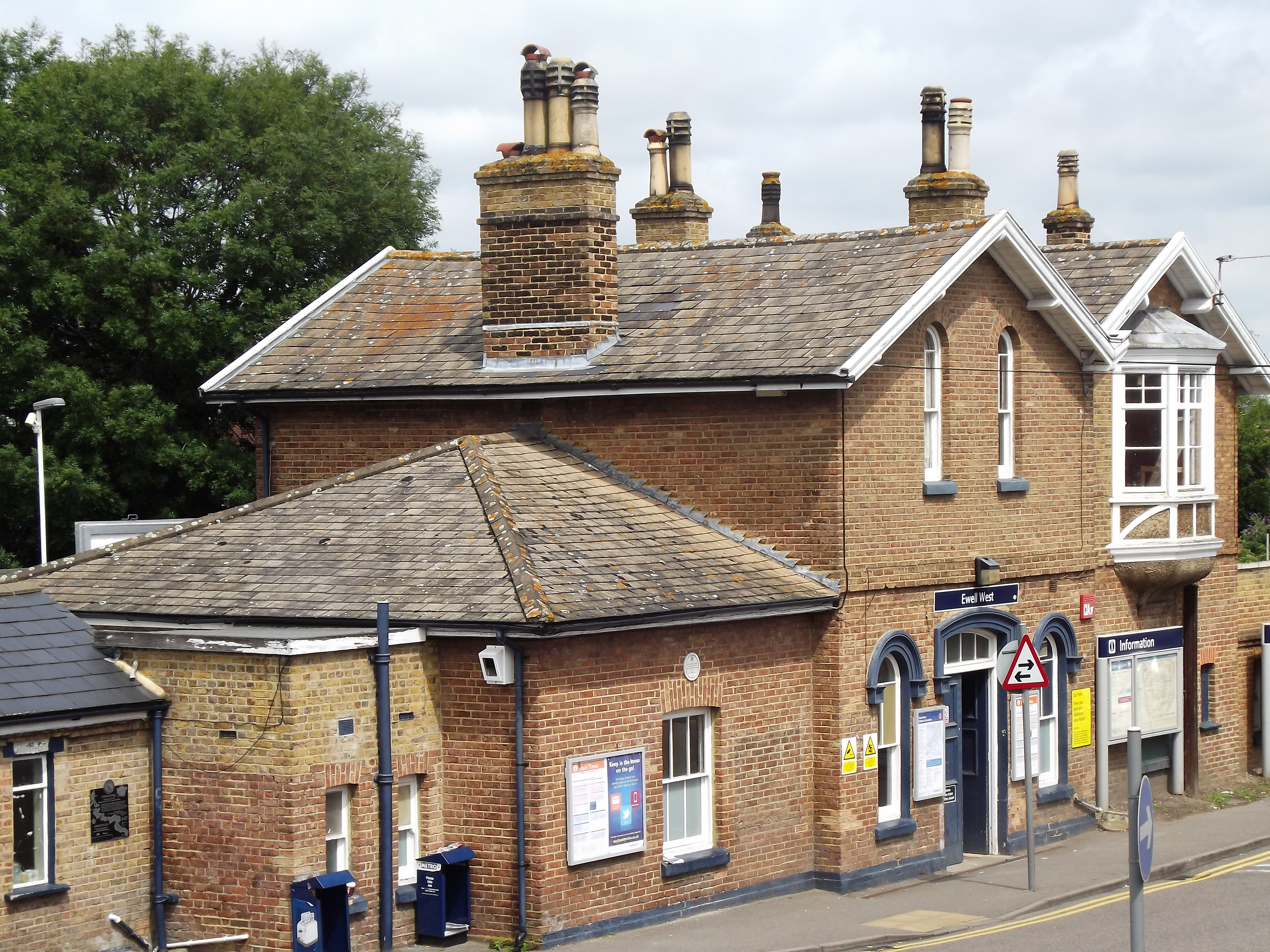
- Interactive map of Ewell West

General information
- Location: Ewell
- Local authority: Borough of Epsom and Ewell
- Managed by: South Western Railway
- Station code: EWW
- DfT category: C2
- Number of platforms: 2
- Accessible: Yes
- Fare zone: 6

National Rail annual entry and exit
- 2020–21: ▼0.254 million
- 2021–22: ▲0.663 million
- 2022–23: ▲0.808 million
- 2023–24: ▲0.921 million
- 2024–25: ▲0.971 million

Key dates
- 4 April 1859: Opened

Other information
- External links: Departures; Facilities
- Coordinates: 51°21′01″N 0°15′25″W

Ewell West railway station is one of two stations serving the town of Ewell in Surrey, England. The station is served by South Western Railway. It is 12 miles 78 chains (20.9 km) down the line from London Waterloo.

From 1905 to 1950 there was a connection to the Horton Light Railway which had been built to transport building materials to the cluster of hospitals in the Horton Lane area.

Ewell West has been in London fare zone 6 since 2007.

In 2019, a new upgraded footbridge opened providing step free access.

== Services ==
All services at Ewell West are operated by South Western Railway.

The typical off-peak service in trains per hour is:

- 2 tph to London Waterloo via Wimbledon
- 1 tph to Dorking
- 1 tph to Guildford

Additional services call at the station during the peak hours.

Preceding station	National Rail	Following station
Stoneleigh	South Western Railway Mole Valley Line	Epsom

== See also ==
- Ewell East railway station
