= Heidi Horten =

Austrian billionaire and art collector (1941–2022)

- Born: Heidi Jelinek; 13 February 1941; Vienna, Ostmark, Germany
- Died: 12 June 2022 (aged 81); Klagenfurt, Carinthia, Austria
- Known for: Philanthropy, art collector, and billionaire
- Spouses: Helmut Horten (m. 1966; died 1987) Jean-Marc Charmat (m. 1994; div. 1998) Karl Anton Goëss (m. 2015)

Heidi Horten (née Jelinek; 13 February 1941 – 12 June 2022) was an Austrian billionaire and art collector. She was the widow of businessman Helmut Horten, whose wealth was famously rooted in Nazi profiteering. In May 2020 Forbes estimated her net worth at US$3.0 billion.

== Biography ==
Horten inherited her wealth upon the death of her husband, the founder of the German department store business Horten AG. Horten met her husband when she was 19; he was 32 years older than her. Horten was part of the board of Helmut Horten Stiftung, a charitable foundation that supports various healthcare related institutions, funds medical research, and helps individuals in need.

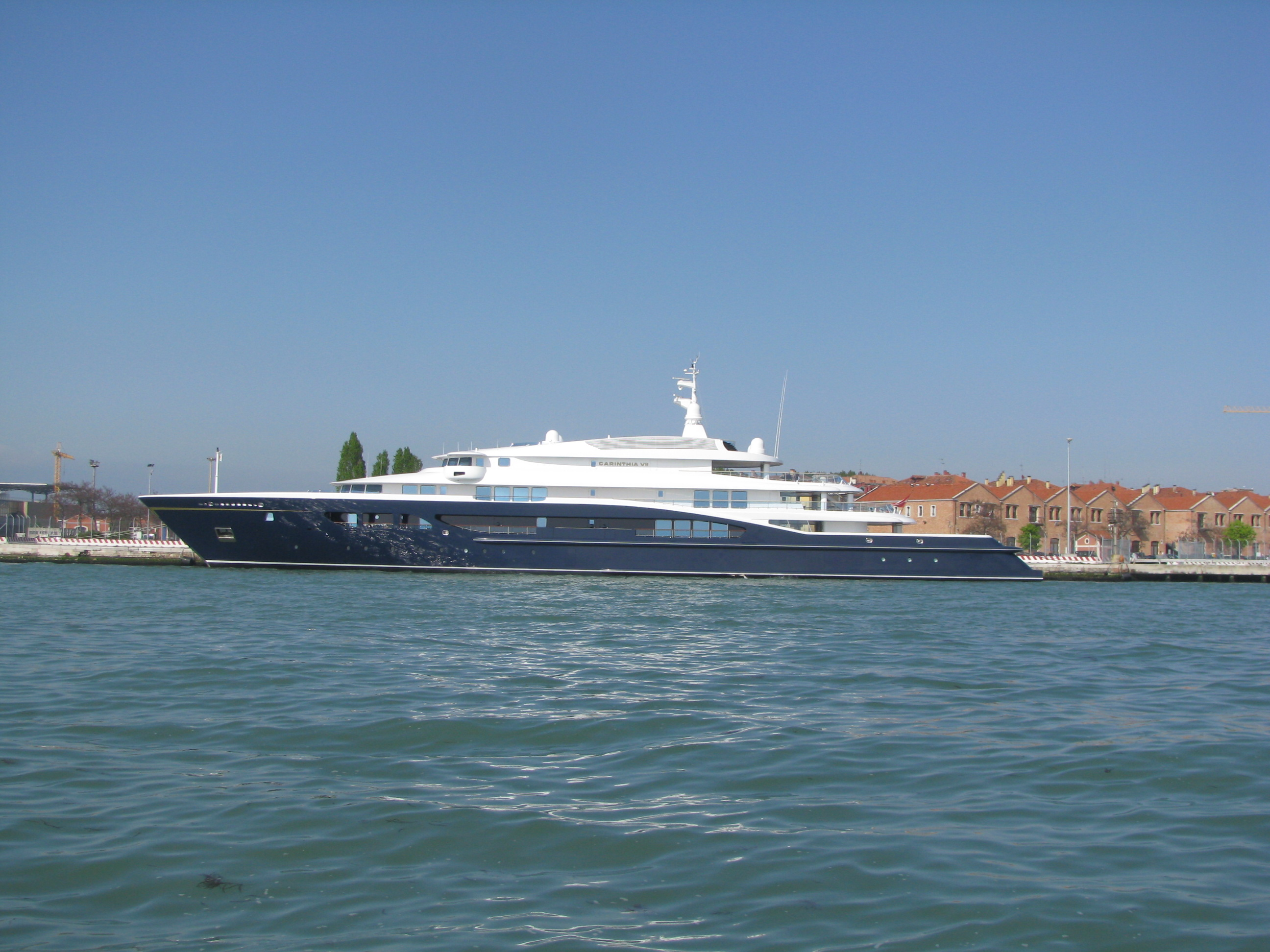
Luxury yacht Carinthia VII (owned by Heidi Horten, Austria) in Venice

Horten divided her time between Vienna, Austria, and Ticino, Switzerland, when in Europe, and Lyford Cay in the Bahamas. Horten owned the Carinthia VII, a 315-foot yacht. She enjoyed hunting and art collecting. Horten sold the 35.56 carat Wittelsbach Diamond, formerly part of the Crown Jewels of Bavaria, for $24 million in 2008.

In August 2019, it emerged that Horten had donated almost one million euros in 2018 and in 2019 to the Austrian People's Party (ÖVP).

== Art collection ==
Horten amassed an art collection of over 500 works, which included paintings by Pablo Picasso, Marc Chagall, Jean-Michel Basquiat, Andy Warhol, Gerhard Richter, Georg Baselitz, and Yves Klein. In 2018, 170 works from the Heidi Horten Collection were exhibited at Leopold Museum in Vienna.

In 2019, Horten announced plans to open a private museum, having bought a 155-year-old, 2,000 m^{2} (22,000 sq ft) mansion in Vienna to house the collection. Designed by architects Marie-Therese Harnoncourt-Fuchs and Ernst Fuchs, the museum opened to the public in 2022.

Following Horten's death, her jewellery collection was auctioned by Christie's in May 2023. The auction set a record for the most valuable single collection of jewels, fetching CHF 180 million (US$201 million). Following controversy over the source of the Horten fortune, Christie's announced that a portion of the proceeds would be contributed to Holocaust education and related causes. On 31 August 2023, Christie's cancelled the auction entirely after Jewish charities and organizations refused to accept any moneys related to the sale.
