= Horton, Minnesota =

Unincorporated community in Minnesota, United States

Horton
- Unincorporated community
- Location within Minnesota Location within the United States
- Coordinates: 46°48′40″N 95°05′50″W
- Country: United States
- State: Minnesota
- County: Hubbard
- Elevation: 1,414 ft (431 m)
- Time zone: UTC-6 (Central (CST))
  - Summer (DST): UTC-5 (CDT)
- Area code: 218
- GNIS feature ID: 654759

Horton is an unincorporated community in Hubbard County, in the U.S. state of Minnesota.

== History ==
The community was named for Edward H. Horton, a lumberman.
