= Hortonia floribunda =

Scientific classification
- Kingdom: Plantae
- Clade: Tracheophytes
- Clade: Angiosperms
- Clade: Magnoliids
- Order: Laurales
- Family: Monimiaceae
- Genus: Hortonia
- Species: H. floribunda

Binomial name
- Hortonia floribunda Wight ex Arnott

Species of flowering plant

Hortonia floribunda is a species of plant in the Monimiaceae family. It is endemic to Sri Lanka.

== Culture ==
Known as "වෑවිය - wewiya" in Sinhala.
