= Horton Country Park =

Nature reserve in Epsom and Ewell, Surrey, England

Coordinates: 51.351°N 0.290°W

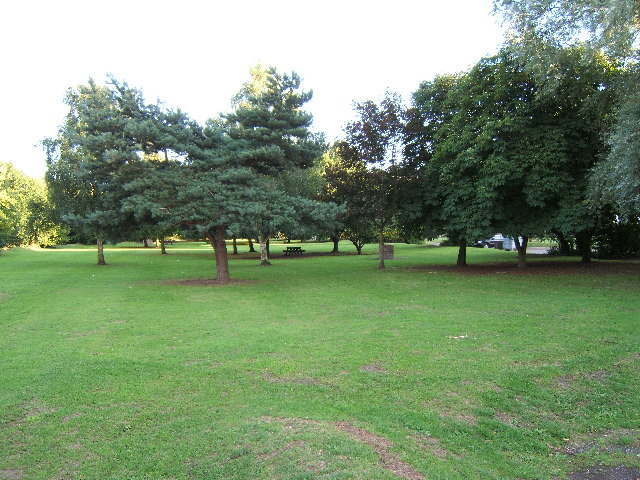
- Interactive map of Horton Country Park
- Type: Local Nature Reserve
- Location: Epsom, Surrey
- OS grid: TQ 192 627
- Area: 152.3 hectares (376 acres)
- Manager: Epsom and Ewell Borough Council

Horton Country Park is a 152.3-hectare (376-acre) Local Nature Reserve north-west of Epsom in Surrey. It is owned and managed by Epsom and Ewell Borough Council.

The park is a wooded recreation and amenities area occupying the east of a narrow upland watershed between two tributaries. As such, the summit being the parish divide, it is in traditional terms, within Epsom parish and occupies land due west of the town, and due east of the semi-rural, semi-urban London district of Chessington.

Part of the area is occupied by Hobbledown Children's Farm, which contains various folkloric themed adventure playgrounds and a small zoo hosting domestic farm animals, and exotics such as meerkat, nilgai, emu and Bactrian camel. The farm is not open to adults without children. The Horton Light Railway used to run through this land from Ewell West railway station to the five psychiatric hospitals owned by the London County Council, known as the Epsom Cluster. Parts of the landscaped grounds of these hospitals have now been incorporated into the country park.

The Thames Down Link long-distance footpath from Kingston upon Thames to Box Hill & Westhumble station passes through the park.
