= Helmut Horten =

German retailing entrepreneur (1909–1987)

- Born: 8 January 1909; Bonn, Kingdom of Prussia, German Empire
- Died: 30 November 1987 (aged 78); Croglio, Ticino, Switzerland
- Occupation: Businessman
- Known for: Department stores and supermarkets
- Spouse: Heidi Jelinek (m. 1966)

Helmut Horten (8 January 1909 – 30 November 1987) was a German entrepreneur who built up and owned the fourth-largest chain of department stores in Germany, Horten AG. The business practices of Mr. Horten flourished during the Nazi era, when he purchased Jewish businesses sold under duress. His practices are well documented.

== Early life ==
Helmut Horten was born on January 8, 1909, in Bonn, Kingdom of Prussia. His father was a judge.

== Career ==
Horten built his vast fortune by forcefully buying Jewish businesses as part of Hitler’s Aryanization process.

Horten was apprenticed in a Düsseldorf department store belonging to Leonhard Tietz before working for the Duisburg department store of the Gebrüder Alsberg (Alsberg brothers) company. When the Nazis came to power in 1933, Horten was able to acquire the company from the Jewish owners, Strauß and Lauter, who fled to the United States. He was aided in this transaction by the banker Wilhelm Reinhold of the Commerz- and Disconto-Bank. The bank was to become a partner in the newly formed Horten & Co.

Until 1939, Horten acquired several other department stores and enjoyed a good relationship with the Nazi government despite that his uncle, the (later) Catholic saint Titus Maria Horten died in custody in 1936. Horten was able to acquire the distribution rights to certain goods which were scarce due to the Second World War.

After the Second World War, Horten was interned by the British Army in 1947 in Recklinghausen. Following a hunger strike he was released in 1948. He soon continued with the consolidation and expansion of his company, which he still owned. Horten introduced Germany's first supermarket after a visit to the United States, the copying of this business model expanding the group quickly.

In 1968, with 25,000 staff and turnover of the equivalent of €1 billion in West German marks, he floated the group on the Frankfurt Stock Exchange.

In 1972, Horten sold his majority stake and retired from the business, which controversially lost a great deal of value soon afterwards. In 1994 the chain was bought by Kaufhof Holding AG, merged into the German retail group METRO AG in 1996.

== Personal life ==
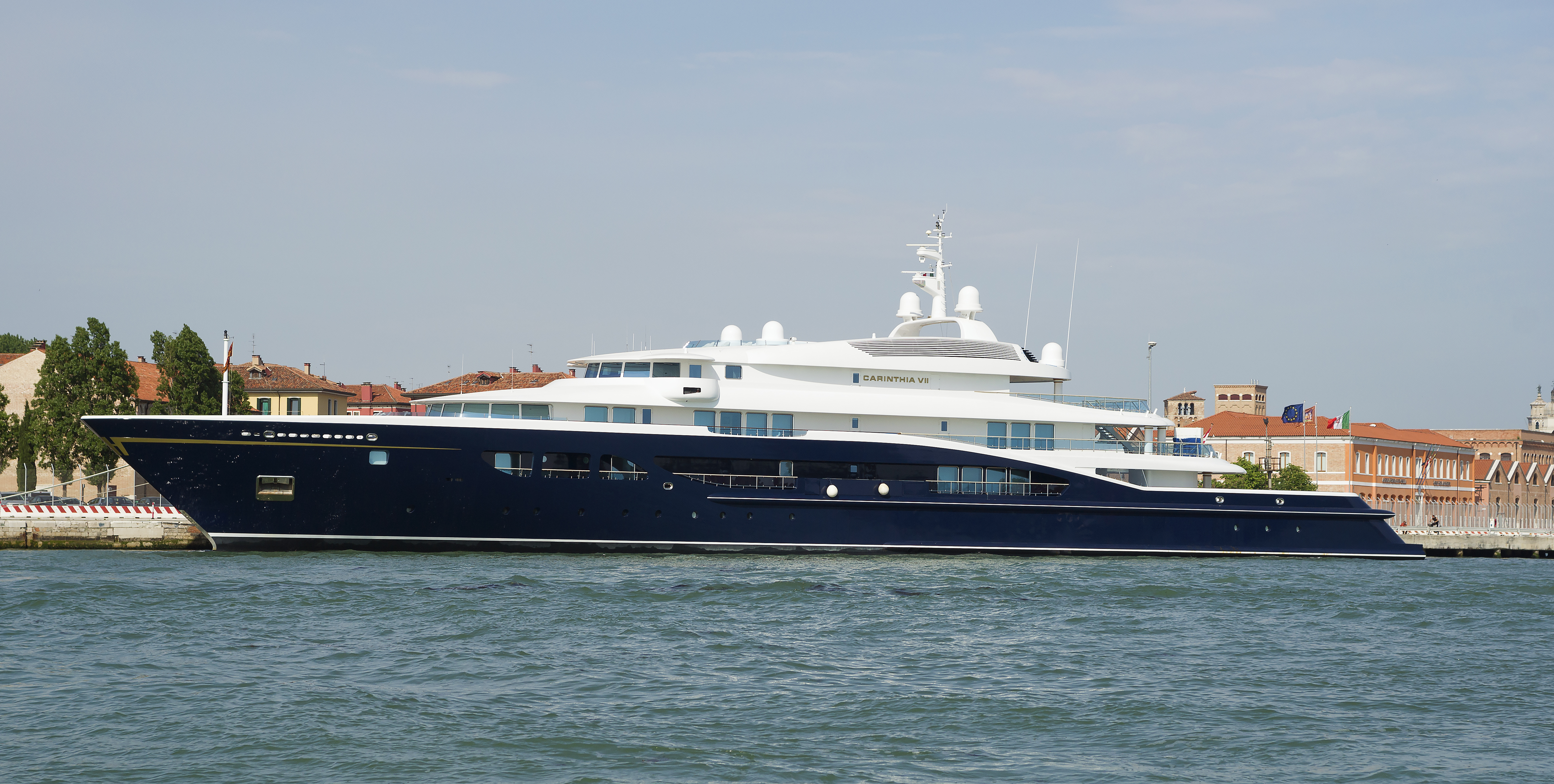
Carinthia VII, the personal yacht of Heidi Horten

In 1960, Horten met 19-year-old Austrian Heidi Jelinek, a woman 32 years his junior, in a hotel bar in Velden am Wörthersee. The couple married on 23 July 1966 in Düsseldorf-Lohausen and moved to Croglio in the Swiss canton of Ticino at the end of 1968. Horten owned a BAC 1-11 as a private jet, a series of private yachts named after Carinthia, and a villa in Mülheim an der Ruhr. In Duisburg, the centre of his business activities, he made donations to the tennis club, the carnival and the zoo. The Helmut Horten Stiftung promotes medical research.

His widow inherited his $1 billion fortune and lived between homes in Croglio, Lyford Cay, by the Wörthersee in Austria and a penthouse in Vienna. Considered one of the world's 500 richest people by Forbes, she also commissioned and owned one of the world's largest yachts, the Carinthia VII. Due to controversy over the source of the Horten fortune, Christie's committed to contributing a portion of the profits from Heidi Horten's posthumous jewellery sale to Holocaust education and related causes. On 31 August 2023, Christie's cancelled the auction entirely after Jewish charities and organizations refused to accept any monies related to the sale.
