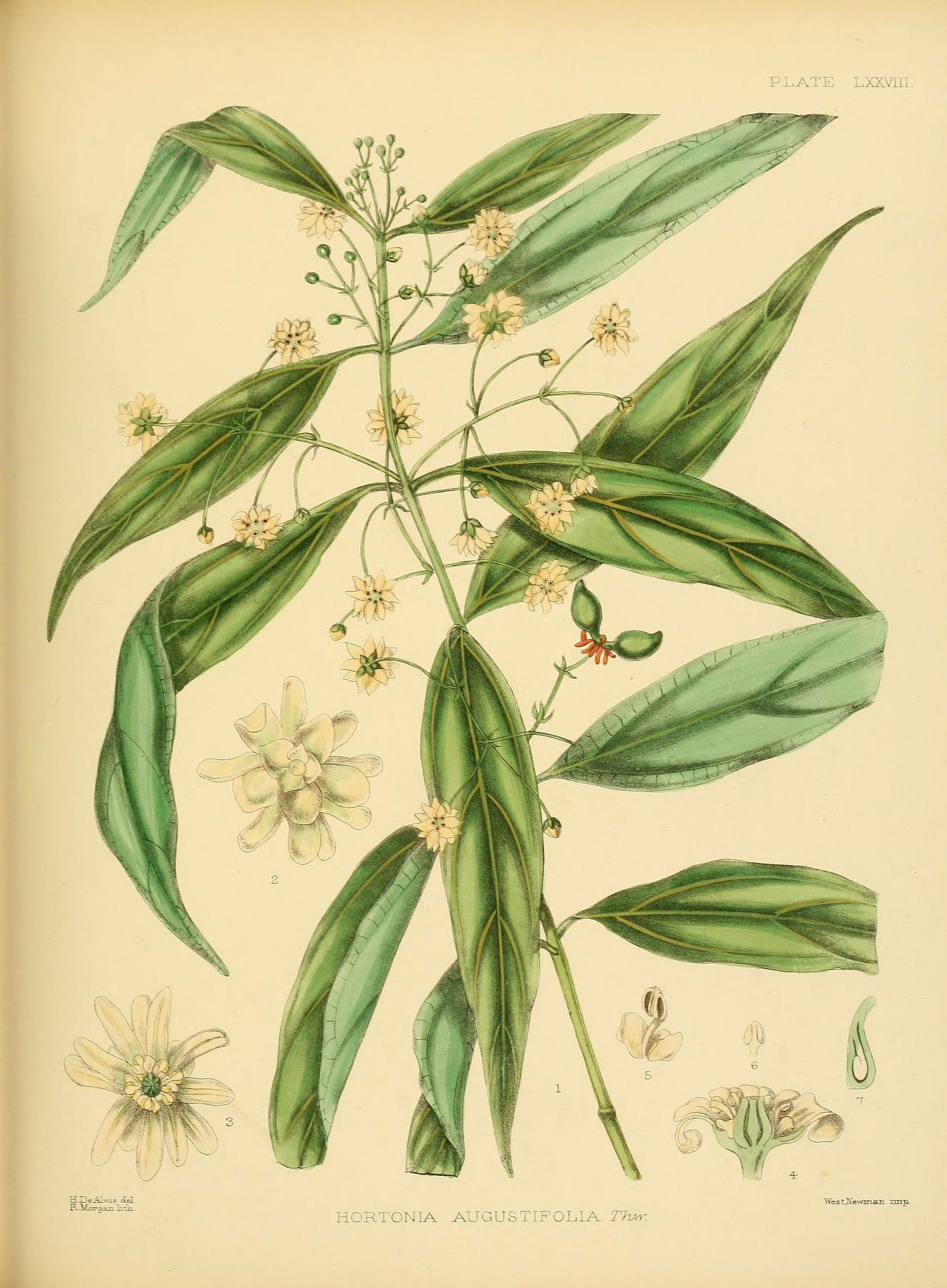
- Hortonia angustifolia

Scientific classification
- Kingdom: Plantae
- Clade: Tracheophytes
- Clade: Angiosperms
- Clade: Magnoliids
- Order: Laurales
- Family: Monimiaceae
- Genus: Hortonia; Wight ex Arnott, 1838

= Hortonia (plant) =

Genus of flowering plants

Hortonia is a genus of trees and shrubs of the family Monimiaceae. It is endemic to Sri Lanka and comprises three species.

== Species ==
Three species are accepted.

- Hortonia angustifolia (Thwaites) Trimen
- Hortonia floribunda Wight ex Arn.
- Hortonia ovalifolia Wight
