= Horton Township =

Horton Township may refer to:

== In Canada ==
- Horton Township, Nova Scotia

== In the United States ==
- Horton Township, Osceola County, Iowa
- Horton Township, Michigan
- Horton Township, Stevens County, Minnesota
- Horton Township, Elk County, Pennsylvania
