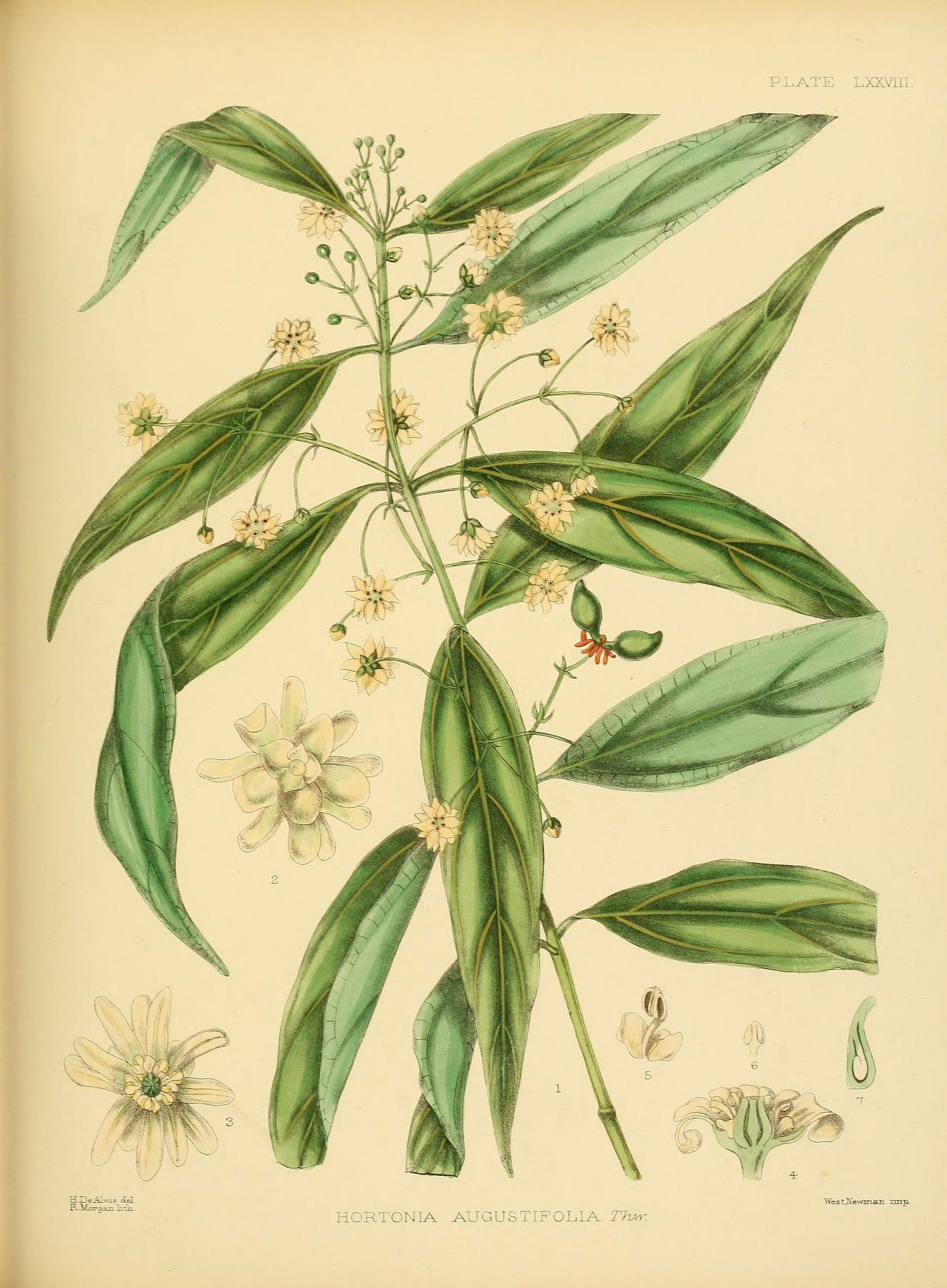

Conservation status
- Critically Endangered (IUCN 2.3)

Scientific classification
- Kingdom: Plantae
- Clade: Tracheophytes
- Clade: Angiosperms
- Clade: Magnoliids
- Order: Laurales
- Family: Monimiaceae
- Genus: Hortonia
- Species: H. angustifolia

Binomial name
- Hortonia angustifolia Trimen

= Hortonia angustifolia =

Species of flowering plant

Hortonia angustifolia is a species of plant in the Monimiaceae family. It is endemic to Sri Lanka.

== Leaves ==
Linear-lanceolate, pointed ends, faintly 3-veined at base.

== Trunk ==
Branches slender.

== Flowers ==
Pale yellow, slender, drooping; Inflorescence - racemes with few flowers.

== Fruits ==
Dark crimson, ovoid, compressed, obliquely pointed, pulpy.

== Ecology ==
Rain forests near waterways.
