= Horton Hospital =

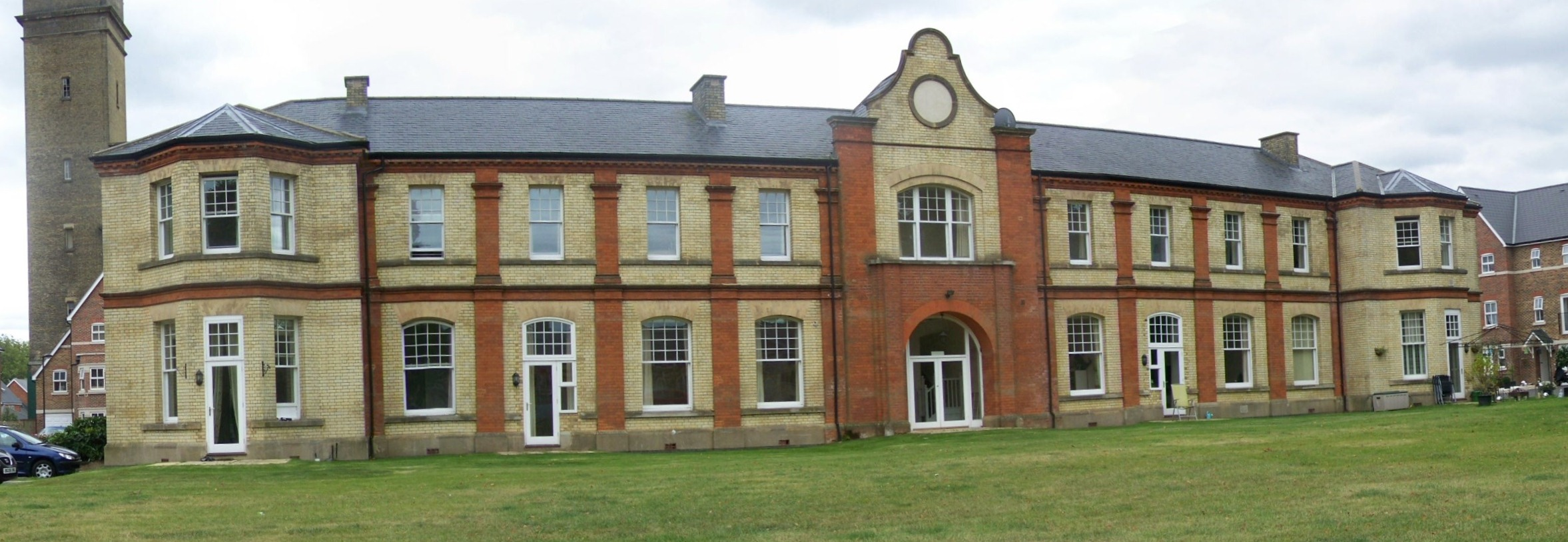
- Former administration block in use as private apartments in 2009

- Location within Surrey

Geography
- Location: Epsom, Surrey, England
- Coordinates: 51°20′36.99″N 0°16′56.89″W

Organisation
- Care system: NHS
- Type: Mental health

History
- Founded: 1902
- Closed: 1997

Links
- Lists: Hospitals in England

Horton Hospital, formerly called Horton Asylum, was a large psychiatric hospital in the Horton area of Epsom, Surrey.

== History ==
=== Origins ===
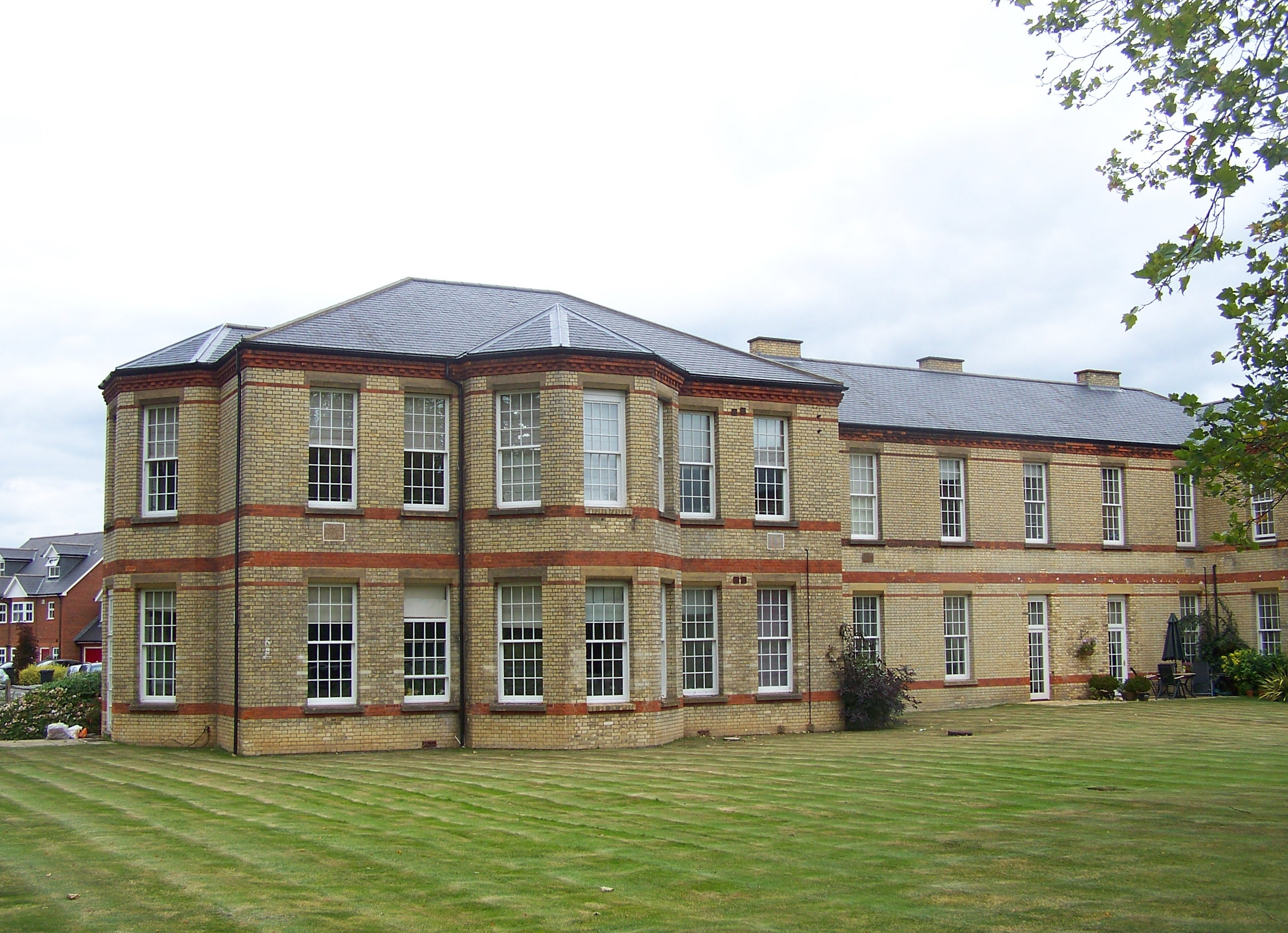
A former ward block now converted to residential use seen in 2009

The hospital was designed for the London County Council by George Thomas Hine, consultant architect to the Commissioners in Lunacy to the London County Council), following a Compact Arrow plan first used at Bexley Asylum at Bexley in Kent. It was opened in 1902 and was the second hospital in the Epsom Cluster, a group of five mental institutions on the Horton Estate to the west of Epsom.

During the two World Wars the hospital was commandeered as a military hospital and the existing patients were transferred elsewhere.

=== Malaria research ===
For much of the 20th century the hospital played an important role in the development of induced malaria treatment as cure for general paralysis of the insane, a form of advanced syphilis. The treatment involved infecting patients with malaria which caused a high fever meant to kill the spirochetes which caused the disease. A laboratory based in the 14-bed isolation unit became a national centre for mosquito breeding and sent infected mosquitoes to all British hospitals which used the treatment. By the 1970s the unit had become the World Health Organization's Regional Malarial Centre for Europe but was rendered obsolete in 1975 by the increasing use of penicillin to treat syphilitic symptoms. The hospital was also notable for its pioneering work in music therapy in the 1960s.

=== Wolvercote Clinic ===
In 1995 the hospital was chosen as the site of a pioneering treatment centre for sex-offenders. The Wolvercote Clinic specialised in the intensive treatment of convicted child sex offenders and gained an international reputation for effective treatment with non-reoffending rates estimated at 80%. Treatment was carried out in secure accommodation for up to 12 months at a time and involved teaching patients to acknowledge their sexual responses to children and to take control of their own behaviour. The clinic closed in 2002 following news that the Hospital site was to be sold for redevelopment.

=== Decline and redevelopment ===
At its peak in 1971, the hospital had 1,587 beds and treated 1,438 patients. By 1975, however, the number of beds had fallen to 1,200 and patient numbers continued to decline until closure. The hospital officially closed in 1997, although the Wolvercote Clinic and a small psychiatric unit known as Horton Haven remained open. The hospital was sold for development in 2002 and most of the buildings were subsequently demolished. The chapel, administration block, water tower and some wards and villas were retained for conversion and incorporation into a new village development on the site.

As of 2009 most of the site had been redeveloped as housing and apartments. The water tower, chapel and former superintendent's residence were empty awaiting conversion while the Horton Haven and original gate lodge remained in use for psychiatric treatment. By October 2012, the water tower had been demolished and a small commemorative plaque stood on the site. The superintendent's residence had become dangerously derelict and the chapel was empty but kept maintained and secured by its owners Epsom and Ewell Borough Council. The Horton Haven continues to provide psychiatric services on the site.
