= Sofie Horten =

Danish journalist

Sofie Horten (1848-1927) was a Danish journalist.

She was employed as the correspondent in the capital for the provincial newspaper Sorø Amtstidende from 1888, and was later employed also by Morgenbladet and Dagbladet. She has been referred to as the first Danish woman to support herself solely as a journalist.
