= Manor Hospital, Epsom =

Manor Hospital
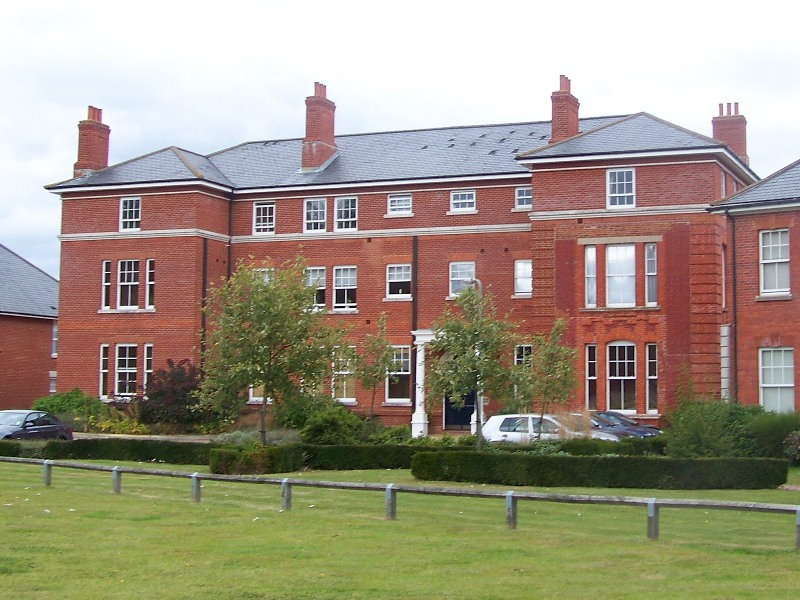
- The refurbished Horton Manor House in use as private apartments in 2009.

- Shown in Surrey

Geography
- Location: Epsom
- Coordinates: 51°20′20.2″N 0°17′16.66″W

Organisation
- Care system: Public NHS
- Type: Mental health

History
- Founded: 1899
- Closed: 1996

The Manor Hospital, formerly The Manor Asylum and The Manor Certified Institution was a mental handicap and psychiatric hospital in Horton, near Epsom, Surrey, United Kingdom

== History ==
=== Ancient use of the site ===
Pottery sherds and worked flints, found on the site of Manor Hospital, show that human activity occurred the early Iron Age and two staters (coins) from this period have been found in the area. This is further to Bronze Age remains which were discovered on nearby Long Grove Road.

=== Construction and development ===
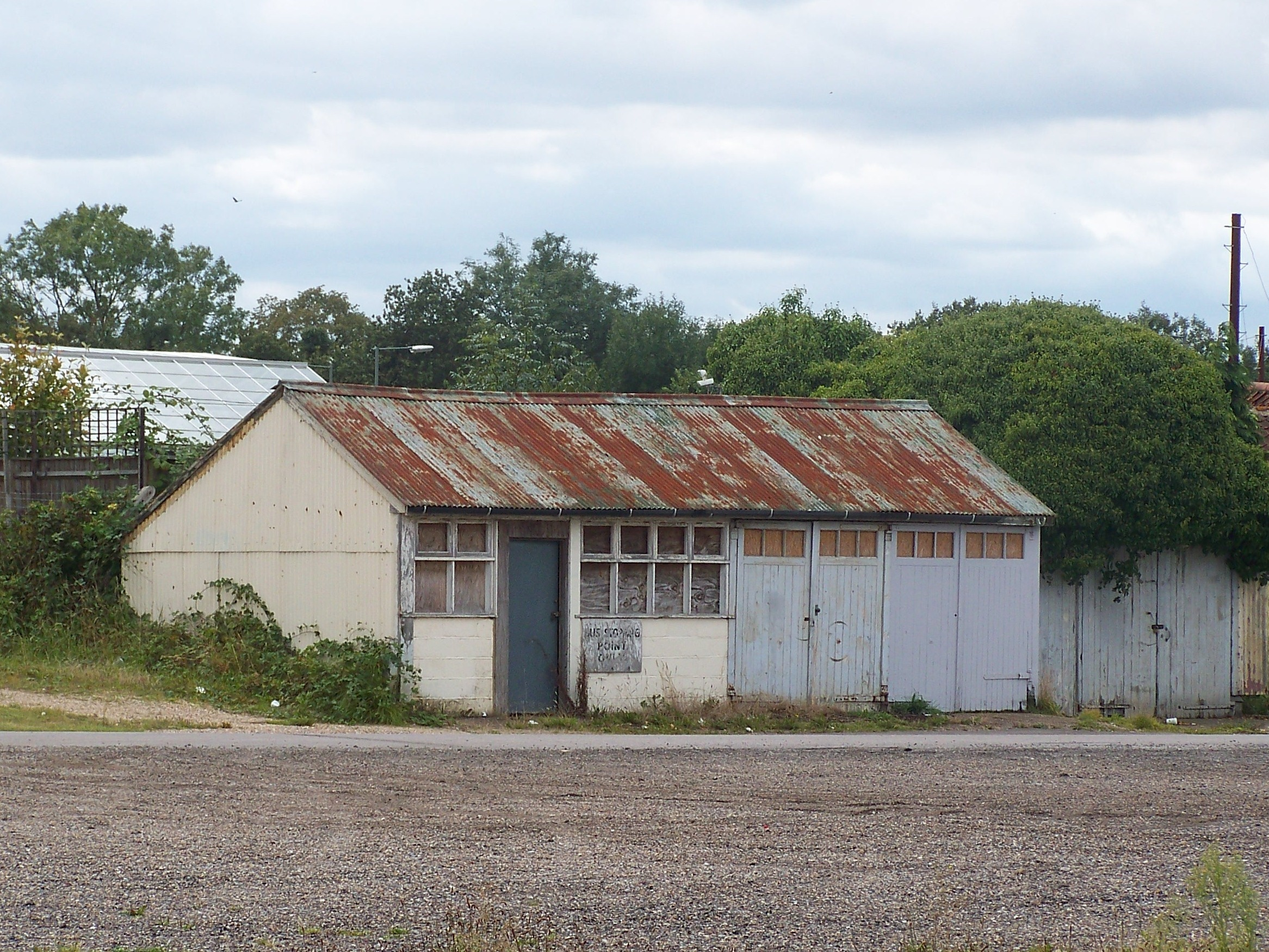
The only surviving part of the original temporary ward buildings, photographed in 2009.

The first of the Epsom Cluster to open on the Horton Manor estate, the Manor Hospital was developed around the existing Horton Manor House between 1896 and 1899 to the design of William C. Clifford-Smith, Architect to the London County Council.

The redbrick manor house was used for the administration offices, with similarly styled buildings built for staff quarters. The storerooms, kitchens and laundry were also built from red brick, with curved gables and slate roofs. Porter's lodges were built at the entrances on Horton Lane and Christchurch Road.

Initially, 700 harmless chronic female patients lived in single-storey pavilions of wood and corrugated iron radiating from the main corridor. Further pavilions were built to the north of the manor house, one of which served as a chapel. An isolation hospital was built in the southwest part of the site and an existing farm bordering Horton Lane provided work for the patients and helped the asylum to maintain self-sufficiency.

In 1901 accommodation was added to the site for 100 male patients who were to provide labour for the Horton Estate's Central Pumping and Power Station. By 1909 ten permanent brick buildings had been added.

=== Wartime use ===
In 1916, the asylum was requisitioned by the Army Council and became the Manor War Hospital. All mental patients were transferred to other institutions and the hospital used to treat soldiers wounded in the First World War.

=== Mental handicap hospital ===
After West Park Hospital opened in 1921, the hospital was redesignated as a Certified Institution for Mental Defectives. The new patients continued to provide labour in the workshops making brushes, shoes, baskets and clothing and learning carpentry and sewing.

In the 1930s Horton Lodge, a large Georgian era mansion on Christchurch Road, was purchased by the LCC as an annexe for the Manor and West Park Hospitals. It was renamed Hollywood Lodge, to avoid confusion with Horton Hospital. The hospital joined the National Health Service in 1948, and continued to care for moderately mentally handicapped young adults and disturbed adolescents. The hospital gained an international reputation for industrial and behavioural therapy and by 1951 it had 1417 beds.

In 1971 there were 1067 beds, 25 of which were in locked wards. By this time the state of the pavilions was causing concern: despite having been built with a life expectancy of 15 years, they were still in use 70 years later. Subsequently, the hospital was redeveloped with large single-storey redbrick bungalows units with flat roofs replacing the old huts. In 1973 the Queen Elizabeth Hospital in Banstead Woods, formerly a children's hospital, became a satellite of the hospital. The hospital by this time had 1042 beds, including those in Hollywood Lodge, Aldingbourne House (a 60-bed unit near Chichester where patients would be sent for seaside holidays) and the Queen Elizabeth Hospital.

=== Decline and redevelopment ===
Following the introduction of Care in the Community, the hospital was gradually reduced in size as patients were moved into alternative accommodation: by 1990 only 454 beds remained. The hospital closed in 1996 although the garden centre and Pine Lodge, a community-based day centre for adults with learning disabilities remained open.

Hollywood Lodge was used as a care home after the closure of Manor Hospital. The care home itself closed in 2003 before being partially destroyed in an arson attack in February 2005.

The bungalow villas have since been demolished and replaced by a new housing estate called 'Manor Park'. The Manor House, Medical Superintendent's house, three of the service blocks and both porter's lodges have been converted to residential use.

== See also ==
- Epsom Cluster
- List of hospitals in England
