= Horten AG =

German department store chain

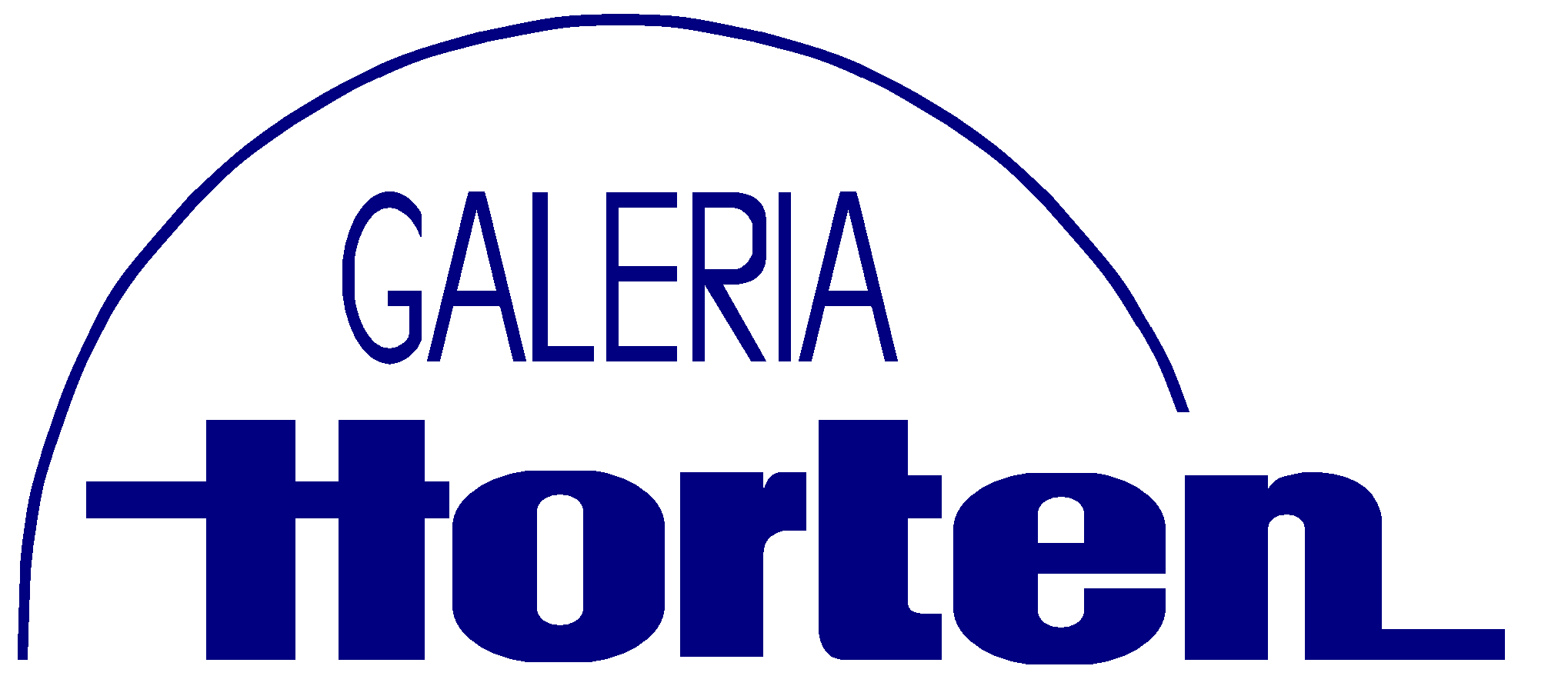
- Company type: joint-stock company
- Industry: Retail
- Founded: Duisburg (1936)
- Founder: Helmut Horten
- Headquarters: Düsseldorf, Germany
- Divisions: department stores (Horten (1936-2004)/ GALERIA Horten (1988-2003) / MERKUR (1945-1988)) smaller department stores (DeFaKa (1936-1973) / Horten extra (1988-1993)) discount department stores (Hanse-SB 1974-1989) restaurants (bon appetite / KUPFERSPIESS); Own Brands (Horten, Miss H.)

Horten AG (Aktiengesellschaft) was a German department store chain founded by Helmut Horten in 1936 and headquartered in Düsseldorf, Germany.

With up to 80 stores throughout Germany, Horten ranked fourth-largest among German department store chains, after Karstadt, Kaufhof and Hertie.

== History ==
Horten company was established buying out Jewish businesses through Nazi "Aryanisation" programme. As a member of the Nazi party, he was able to profit from his connections.

Horten was one of the most modern German department store companies in the 1960s and 1970s. The stores' facades, completely decorated with the so-called 'horten tiles', designed by famous architect Egon Eiermann were typical landmarks within the post-war German pedestrian zones ("Fußgängerzonen"). Many new stores were built and the traditional, long-established high street stores were renovated, modernized, and in some cases, expanded. Horten built the first department stores that included car parks and petrol stations. Horten wanted to be the department store of choice for customers from the suburbs who had their first cars and did not want to travel into the cities by bus or tram. In addition to their high-end downtown department stores, Horten built new "edge of downtown stores." Every department store featured a restaurant, mostly located on the top floor. In the 1960s they were called "KUPFERSPIESS" (Copper Kettle). Later, Horten began to reorganise them into self-service-restaurants and called them "Bon appetit" or "Horten-Restaurant," also combined as "Bon appetit: Ihr Horten-Restaurant." In the 1990s Horten also began introducing the Galeria-concept for its restaurants and gave them a new food distribution sector and a lighter outfit. After Kaufhof took over Horten, they merged their two restaurant companies "Bel-Terine" and "Bon appetit" into one, dubbed "DINEA." Smaller restaurants with less service were called "Grillpfanne."

Horten's dark brown interiors morphed into a more modern and fresh look with the introduction of the new Galeria stores in the 1980s, with an emphasis on lighter colors such as blue, light gray and white. Some of the bigger stores added food courts called "delikatessa" and also added onsite supermarkets. After returning from a visit to the United States and returning with the concept, Helmut Horten opened Germany's first supermarkets in the basement floors of his department stores. They were innovative, modern, and much larger than most German grocery stores at the time.

In 1968 Helmut Horten sold all of his shares in the company and was not subsequently seen at celebratory occasions of Horten AG (like the 50th anniversary in 1986). Helmut Horten died in 1987, at this time his former company had been acquired by British American Tobacco plc.

Until 1988, Horten operated some of its department stores under the name of Merkur; some of the group's smaller department stores were called DeFaKa (Deutsches Familien Kaufhaus), but these had all been replaced with modern types of Horten department stores by the 1970s. In 1988 Horten introduced a new concept for their department stores called the "GALERIA" concept. This proved to be a very successful venture for Horten AG. Horten AG decided to refresh the 39 biggest stores with the GALERIA design, though this goal was never fully implemented. That year, Horten founded Horten-Extra GmbH to hold its thirteen smallest locations not branded with the new GALERIA design. Ten of these Horten-Extra stores were sold to Kaufring AG in 1993. The other three Horten-Extra stores also did not have successful histories. The location in Dortmund was closed directly after the ten Horten-Extra stores were sold; it was renovated as a mall (Westfalen Forum). The other two Horten-Extra stores became part of Kaufhof (Neuss and Schwäbisch Gmünd) and traded for a few years once again as Horten, until the year 2000, when both stores closed because they were considered too small to be renamed Galeria Kaufhof.

In 1994 competitor Kaufhof took over Horten and - over a ten-year period - all Horten department stores were either renamed Kaufhof, sold or closed. This process ended in 2004 with the last stores being closed or renamed and the Horten name disappeared. Today only one store - the Carsch-Haus in Düsseldorf - still has the Horten logo on its facade, struck in stone over the main doors. The former name "Horten im Carsch-Haus" was dropped in 1996. In 2008 Kaufhof cleaned the Horten stone logos and they are now clearly visible on the facade. The store now simply trades as Carsch-Haus and wasn't changed into Kaufhof. A Galeria Kaufhof store is located in the same street. The 'Carsch-Haus' in Düsseldorf was the finest department store of Horten AG and served as a flagship store. It is now run by Kaufhof, but still trades as Carsch-Haus. This store has a very interesting and unique story, as in the 1980s it was dismantled stone by stone and later rebuilt only a few feet away. This became necessary because the 'Rheinbahn' (public transport in Düsseldorf) had planned to build a subway station under the building. After rebuilding, the Carsch-Haus became Horten AG's most modern department store and a model of development for the Galeria concept.

In 1995 Horten AG became a real estate company and leased the Horten stores to Kaufhof. The operating business was transferred to the Horten GALERIA GmbH, which was later merged with Kaufhof AG.

== Former Horten Department Stores ==
- Augsburg, (closed in 1987)
- Aachen, (renovated in 1998, now part of Kaufhof and trading as L store | LUST FOR LIFE)
- Andernach, (Horten-Extra 1988–1993, sold 1993 to Kaufring AG and renamed as J.Gg. Rupprecht, closed 2001)
- Baden-Baden, (Horten-Extra 1988–1993, sold and renamed Wagner-Galerie)
- Bergheim, (Horten-Extra 1988–1993, sold 1993 to Kaufring AG and renamed as J.Gg. Rupprecht, closed 2001, later demolished in 2007)
- Berlin, (former East Berlin location, renamed Kaufhof in 1995, closed in 2007)
- Berlin, (Senftenberger Ring, former West Berlin location, closed in 1988, later became Hertie)
- Bielefeld, (Galeria Horten, renamed Galeria Kaufhof. This store will close in December 2015)
- Bochum-Wattenscheid, (Horten-Extra 1988–1993, sold 1993 to Kaufring AG and renamed as J.Gg. Rupprecht, closed 2001)
- Braunschweig, (renamed Galeria Kaufhof)
- Bremen, (renamed Galeria Kaufhof)
- Bremerhaven, (Merkur 1964–1968, Horten 1968–1996, closed, now Saturn electronic retailer)
- Cottbus (renamed Galeria Kaufhof)
- Dessau (closed in 1995, demolished in 2007)
- Dortmund, (Horten-Extra 1988–1993, closed in 1993)
- Duisburg, (location Königstraße, first Horten in 1936, later sold to Karstadt, demolished in early 2006)
- Duisburg, (location Düsseldorfer Straße, renamed Galeria Kaufhof)
- Duisburg-Marxloh, (Horten-Extra 1988–1993, sold to Kaufring AG and renamed as J.Gg. Rupprecht, closed 2001, later Marxloh-Center mall)
- Düsseldorf, (location Berliner Allee, renamed Galeria Kaufhof. This branch was closed on 20 December 2014 and is being rebuilt since January 6, 2015. The new center-name is from 2017: CROWN.)
- Düsseldorf, (location Heinrich-Heine-Allee, Galeria Horten traded as Horten im Carsch-Haus, now part of Kaufhof and still trading as Carsch-Haus)
- Erlangen, (50th store and one of the last Horten until 2004, renamed Galeria Kaufhof).
- Essen, (Galeria Horten, renamed Galeria Kaufhof)
- Frankfurt am Main, (location Hessen-Center mall, opened 1968, closed in 1978)
- Frankfurt (Oder), (closed, later demolished in 2006)
- Gera, (closed 2003, this department store was the first HERTIE (Hermann Tietz), Horten was planning to replace it with a new Galeria Horten retail store in a mall on the outskirts of the city. But they had no permit for the city government. The government wanted to keep the store in the city center. Horten then planned in another location, just a few steps from the previous house. The new building was carried out by the Galeria Kaufhof years later. After the completion of the new building, the Horten store was closed and converted into a shopping center. This center, to commemorate the historic name of Oscar Tietz, (who built the HERTIE-store in Gera and was a nephew of Hermann Tietz), is called "DAS tietz" [eng.: the Tietz])
- Gevelsberg, (Horten-Extra 1988–1993, sold 1993 to Kaufring AG and renamed as J.Gg. Rupprecht, closed 2001)
- Gotha, (closed in 1995, later sold)
- Gießen, (last Galeria Horten until 2003, renamed Galeria Kaufhof, closed 16 June 2012)
- Günthersdorf, (Galeria Horten, renamed Galeria Kaufhof, closed 2010)
- Hagen, (became part of Kaufhof and first trading as CITY-FACH-MARKT, 2011-2014 Galeria Kaufhof for sports, kids-wear and toys, also Saturn electronic retailer. In 2013, Saturn Electronics moved into a new shopping center nearby. In Hagen were Kaufhof and Horten on view, as the Galeria Kaufhof now had to decide whether they wanted to run the old Horten in the future alone as Galeria Kaufhof and closes her old house. Alternatively, had the old Kaufhof be expanded and could be closed the old Horten, they opted for this possibility and enlarged the old Kaufhof. In late summer 2014, also the Galeria Kaufhof closed its departments in the former Horten. The store will be now rebuilt for the German fashion chain SinnLeffers, which has its headquarters in Hagen, but there for several years did not was operating a branch.)
- Halle (Saale), (closed, renamed Kaufhaus Rolltreppe)
- Hamburg, Eidelstedt (traded as Hanse-SB, closed in 1989)
- Hamburg, (location Mönckebergstraße, became part of Kaufhof and trading 1999 to 2001 as L store | LUST FOR LIFE, now SATURN. This store of Saturn is the largest consumer electronics retailer in the world with 18,000 m^{2} / 190,000 sq ft)
- Hamburg-Poppenbüttel, (Galeria Horten, renamed Galeria Kaufhof in 2000, later closed and finally sold)
- Hamburg-Wandsbek, (closed in 1988, later sold)
- Hamm, (Sold in 2002 to the Turkish company "yimpas". Yimpas at first ran the department store under the name of Horten; only the supermarket was immediately renamed into yimpas. Yimpas was very hard to continue to be attractive for German customers and employed many German workers, in addition, there were also Turkish-born workers. By 2003 Yimpas had changed the supply of goods so much, that they were no longer possible to run the department store under the brand name Horten, the brand was still in use by Kaufhof for other stores in Germany. After the name change, however, remained more and more German customers away because Yimpas as a department store was previously unknown. The customers preferred the Kaufhof department store, which is just a few steps away. The proximity between the department stores, was also the reason for the sale of the house. The branch in Hamm was being considered for conversion into a Galeria Horten by the end of the 1990s. In spring 2004, the department store section closed and only the yimpas-supermarket in the basement remained open, but this was too expensive for Yimpas. By the end of 2004, also the supermarkt was closed. The house was locked up for over two years and then it was reopened for one day a week before its break for a farewell party. On this day, 200 of the typical Horten-facade elements were available for purchase, the celebration included live music, a flea market and a guided tour through the abandoned upper floors and the large restaurant area, which was closed since 2003, demolished in 2007)
- Hannover, (Galeria Horten (1991), renamed Galeria Kaufhof (1995))
- Heidelberg, (in 1988 it became the first Galeria Horten, renamed Galeria Kaufhof)
- Heidenheim, (Horten-Extra 1988–1993, sold 1993 to Kaufring AG and renamed as J.Gg. Rupprecht, closed 2001)
- Heilbronn, (renamed Galeria Kauhof)
- Hildesheim, (renamed Galeria Kafhof)
- Ingolstadt, (renamed Galeria Kaufhof)
- Jena, (unfinished department store ruin of the GDR "HO-konsument" was finished by Horten in 1991 (Horten-in-Jena GmbH), closed in 1994, demolished in 2010), could not open as Galeria Horten, because of the small retail space (32,291 sq ft). It was planned to build a large extension to the existing department store, next to the store was a large open space available. But the weak sales of this store led to a quick abandonment of the plans and the store.
- Kempen, (closed and later sold)
- Kempten (renamed Galeria Kaufhof)
- Kiel, (closed in 1989, later sold. In the 1980s, a new Galeria Horten, should be built as a replacement in Kiel, but the strict conditions and delays stopped the plans. The area for the new department store is still lying fallow.)
- Krefeld, (one of the last Horten department stores until 2004, renamed Kaufhof. The extension into a GALERIA Kaufhof was planned in 2002–2006, therefore the fourth floor should be remodeled as retail space, two escalators should be built (the former storage area in the fourth floor was used sometimes before as special sales area). In 2008, the renovation and plans to reconstruct the store were stopped. Also in 2008 the "Horten Unterwelt" (after 2004: "Kaufhof Unterwelt") was closed, the "Horten/Kaufhof Unterwelt" started in 1998 as kiosk and shop for some special offers, but soon became a cheap goods store. The "Unterwelt" was located in an underground passageway, this passage was planned for a never built subway-system in Krefeld, the name "Unterwelt" [eng.: undergroundworld] was an allusion to the Horten-slogan "Eine Welt voller Ideen" [eng.: "A World full of Ideas"]. The store closed in July 2010. It was planned to redevelop the store in 2012/2013 for SATURN Electronics and PRIMARK. In 2014 the house was reopened with PRIMARK as anchor tenant on three floors. Instead of Saturn opened Toys "R" Us on the second floor, a fitness center on the third floor and drugstore dm on the ground floor.)
- Leipzig, (closed in 2001, after a new Galeria Kaufhof department store was finished, sold to Karstadt in 2006, demolished in 2011. In 2012 opened the new shopping mall "Höfe am Brühl", the characteristic aluminium facade from the former department store was reused. Seen from the outside, this corner of the new Center looks the same, like the old department store, but inside is all new.)
- Leipzig-Paunsdorf, (Galeria Horten, new built in 1992–1994, renamed Galeria Kaufhof, closed in 2010)
- Ludwigshafen, (renamed Kaufhof, closed in June 2010. After five years without business, the store was sold in August 2015 to be renovated in 2016. For fall 2017, the owners plan to reopen with new tenants, but only on a third of the area for retailers; on the upper floors offices and apartments will be built.)
- Mannheim, (renamed Galeria Kaufhof)
- Marburg, (sold)
- Mülheim an der Ruhr, (closed in 1977)
- Münster, (Galeria Horten, renamed Galeria Kaufhof)
- Moers, (closed in 1999, demolished in 2014 together with the abandoned C&A-store to build a new mall.)
- Neuss, (built as Merkur 1964–1966, Horten 1966–1988, part of Horten-Extra 1988–1994, Horten 1994–1999, 1999 closed and sold, now Tranktor mall. The store in Neuss was the biggest one of the Horten-Extra GmbH and it was never planned to be renamed into Galeria Horten. With the day of renaming Kaufhof in Neuss into Galeria Kaufhof, the Horten was closed.)
- Nürnberg, (one of the last Horten department stores until 2004, renamed Kaufhof, closed 16 June 2012. Since 2013 wants the supermarket chain EDEKA open a branch in the house, but not so big as is scheduled to open in 2017 in the Düsseldorf CROWN center. So far, fails the plans on the vacancy off the upper floors. The parking garage is also only connected via the second floor of the department store.)
- Oldenburg, (renovation and remodeling once were started to rename this Horten-store, into Galeria Horten, but it was renamed Galeria Kaufhof in 1995, so it became the first Galeria Kaufhof)
- Osnabrück, (it was the last store of Horten, renamed into Galeria Horten, but it was still a few weeks ago renamed Galeria Kaufhof in 1995, so it became the second Galeria Kaufhof)
- Pforzheim, (renamed Galeria Kaufhof)
- Pirmasens, (Horten-Extra 1988–1993, sold 1993 to Kaufring AG and was renamed as J.Gg. Rupprecht, closed 2001, later sold to H&M)
- Plauen (closed in December 2000, later sold)
- Potsdam (closed in 1996 after a fire, later sold to Karstadt)
- Recklinghausen, (traded as Hanse-SB, closed in 1988, then Löhrhof mall, closed and demolished in 2012)
- Regensburg, (renamed Galeria Kaufhof)
- Reutlingen, (Galeria Horten, renamed Galeria Kaufhof)
- Schwäbisch Gmünd, (Horten 1972–1988, Horten-Extra 1988–1993, traded as Horten 1994–2000, but was part of Kaufhof Mode&Sport, closed in 2000, later demolished)
- Schweinfurt, (renamed Galeria Kaufhof)
- Stuttgart, (Galeria Horten, renamed Galeria Kaufhof)
- Stralsund (closed in 1994)
- Sulzbach, (Galeria Horten, location Main-Taunus-Zentrum mall, renamed Galeria Kaufhof)
- Trier, (renamed Galeria Kaufhof)
- Ulm, (renamed Galeria Kaufhof)
- Viersen, (the prototype-store for Horten-Extra in 1987, part of Horten-Extra GmbH 1988–1993, sold 1993 to Kaufring AG and renamed as J.Gg. Rupprecht, closed 2001, later demolished)
- Weimar, (Horten-in-Weimar GmbH, smallest Horten-store with 13,993 sq ft, 1991–1995)
- Wetzlar, (Horten-Extra 1988–1993, sold 1993 to Kaufring AG and renamed as J.Gg. Rupprecht, closed 2001)
- Wiesbaden, (Galeria Horten renamed Galeria Kaufhof)
- Witten, (renamed Galeria Kaufhof)
- Worms, (Horten-Extra 1988–1993, sold 1993 to Kaufring AG and renamed as J.Gg. Rupprecht, closed 2001)
- Wuppertal, (DeFaKa. Rebuilt in 1963 and traded as Horten 1963–1975. The store was sold to German fashion chain CRAMER & MEERMANN and operated under this name 1976–1997. Three of five C&M stores were 1997 acquired by MARKS & SPENCER. The store were then operated as MARKS & SPENCER until 1999. The Wuppertal branch was 2000 sold to WEHMEYER, which was a German fashion chain of KarstadtQuelle AG. Wehmeyer rebuilt the house in order according to their own needs and reduced the sales area significantly. In the 2005 crisis of KarstadtQuelle AG Wehmeyer was sold and went 2008 into bankruptcy. The branch was closed in the course of the insolvency proceedings in September of the same year. Since March 2009 the store is operated as TK maxx)
- Zwickau (closed)
