= Horton, Surrey =

Village in Surrey, England

Coordinates: 51.347°N 0.285°W

Horton
- Location within Surrey
- Area: 1.5 sq mi (3.9 km^{2})
- Population: 5,000
  - Density: 3,333/sq mi (1,287/km^{2})
- OS grid reference: TQ1962
  - London: 12.8 mi (20.6 km) NNE
- District: Epsom and Ewell
- Shire county: Surrey
- Region: South East
- Country: England
- Sovereign state: United Kingdom
- Post town: EPSOM
- Postcode district: KT19
- Dialling code: 01372
- Police: Surrey
- Fire: Surrey
- Ambulance: South East Coast
- UK Parliament: Epsom and Ewell

Horton is a village in the borough of Epsom and Ewell, in the county of Surrey, England. It is situated between the towns and villages of Epsom, West Ewell, Chessington and Malden Rushett. Its principal road is Horton Lane, which runs the length of the area between West Ewell and Epsom Common. Horton Country Park also runs along the length of the area, between Epsom Common and West Ewell.

The place-name Horton is relatively common in England. It derives from Old English horu 'dirt' and tūn 'settlement, farm, estate', presumably meaning 'farm on muddy soil'. It gave its name to the Horton Light Railway which served a number of the psychiatric hospitals in the area during the 20th century, collectively known as the Epsom Cluster.

Since the 1990s, Horton has undergone rapid change. The hospitals which made up the Epsom Cluster closed as Care in the Community took over from inpatient care. Multiple housing estates including Manor Park were constructed on the site, in addition to a number of shops in the centre of the area. In 2022, Horton was made a ward in Epsom and Ewell borough due to the population increase in the area.

== History ==
=== Ancient use and the Horton Manor Estate ===
The earliest evidence of human activity in Horton is from the mid-Bronze Age. Remains of pits, ditches and post holes in Long Grove Road indicate that the Horton area was used for agriculture in prehistoric times, which may suggest the presence of an established settlement nearby. Pottery sherds and worked flints, found on the site of the former Manor Hospital site in Horton, show that human activity continued into the early Iron Age and two staters (coins) from this period have been found in the area.

As shown in an 1816 Ordnance Survey map of the area, Horton was a hamlet, separated by fields from the more substantial settlements of Ewell and Epsom.

During the 19th Century, the Horton Manor Estate existed across what is now present-day Horton. Owned by Thomas Buxton, it contained the hamlet of Horton, where the present day Horton Local Centre is located. A map from 1890 shows Horton Farm existed (now Hobbledown). Horton Manor House was located on what is now the western edge of the Manor Park Estate today. The Horton Manor Estate was part of the Epsom Parish. The north of the estate bordered the Ewell Parish.

=== 20th Century: Epsom Cluster ===
The Horton area was occupied by five psychiatric hospitals for almost all the duration of the 20th Century. Known as the Epsom Cluster, the hospitals were built by London County Council to institutionalize the city's psychiatric patients. These hospitals were largely shut down in the 1990s and early 2000s as Care in the community became the predominant government policy at the time.

=== Housing and retail development ===
From the early 1990s to the mid-2010s, housing estates rapidly sprung up on the former sites of the Epsom Cluster institutions, including Clarendon Park (completed in 1992) and Manor Park. They are all connected to Horton Lane via the extensive network of roundabouts. Around 2010, a retail centre was developed, containing about 14 units including a Tesco Express supermarket.

== Geography ==
Horton is centred on the area of shops near the roundabout of Horton Lane and Chantilly Way. This shopping parade gives the area a village centre like feel. Horton Lane travels the length of Horton (SSW to NNE) from Epsom Common to Hook Road Arena. The road contains cycle lanes both on the road and pavement, alongside a wide footpath. Hobbledown children's park is located close to Horton's centre.

Horton Country Park runs along the length of the western side of the area. Newly constructed housing estates can be found on both sides of Horton Lane on the site of former hospitals. Horton Park Golf Course occupies the north-west of the area, contiguous with the county park. This park is adjacent to Epsom Common and Castle Hill Nature Reserve. This links the park to the wider Surrey and London countryside, resulting in Horton having a more rural setting than suburban Ewell and Chessington.

A smaller park, Long Grove Park and a primary school is in the east of the area, with the Old Moat Garden Centre in the south.

=== Topography ===
Horton is situated on a gentle incline running South-south west from West Ewell to Epsom Common, along Horton Lane and Horton Country Park. The lowest part of Horton is at 27 m (89 ft) where the Horton Stream (a tributary of the Hogsmill River) flows out of the north-east of Horton Country Park adjacent to Chessington Road (B284). The highest point can be found near the junction of Horton Lane and Christchurch Road (B280) in the grounds of Hollywood Lodge, at 71 metres (233 ft) above sea level.

The Horton Stream forms a valley in the west of Horton, in the Country Park. The east and south of Horton is higher owing to a ridge of land between the Horton Stream and the Green Lanes stream which is sourced at nearby Epsom Common. The area is in the low-lying London Clay geological region, just south of the North Downs chalk ridge of Epsom Downs and Headley. Further this stream connects to the Hogsmill River.

== Localities ==
=== Horton Park Golf Club ===
Contains an 18-hole course, a Par 3 9 hole course, a driving range in addition to a crazy golf course which opened in 2014. Located in the north of Horton, contiguous with Horton Country Park.

=== Hook Road Arena ===
An area of enclosed green space located in the north of Horton. Hosts funfair events in addition to the annual firework and bonfire night. The Epsom Riding for the Disabled Association (RDA) horse riding charity is based adjacent to the arena.

=== Horton Country Park ===
A 1.5 mile long area of open space just west of Horton Lane, with a large car park. A mixture of woodland and fields, containing some horses in the fields. Contains Epsom Polo Club. Adjacent to Epsom Common and Castle Hill Nature Reserve, Chessington.

=== Hobbledown ===
A children's adventure park and zoo, located just west of Horton Lane, adjacent to the David Lloyd Centre and Horton Country Park. Contains a soft play area. Formerly known as Horton Park Children's Farm.

=== Long Grove Park ===
An enclosed space located in the east of the area. Contains a playground and is adjacent to the residential area in the west of Epsom. The park is also continuous with open space beside Abbots Avenue.

== Surrounding Area ==
The nearest towns to Horton is Epsom and Chessington, located 2 miles to the east and west. The residential area of West Ewell is contiguous with Horton.
