= Horton Park (Saint Paul, Minnesota) =

Public park and arboretum

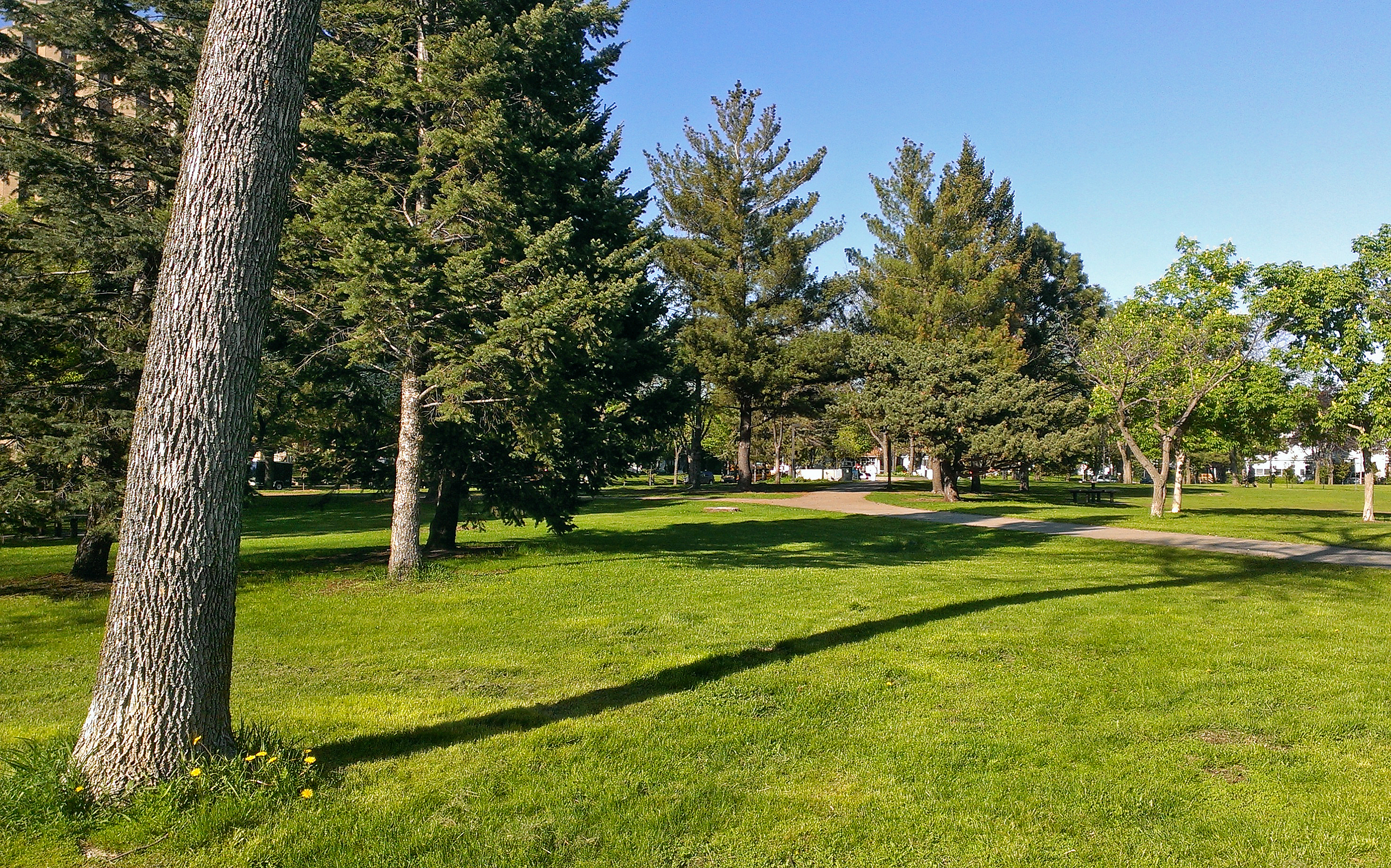
- Horton Park
- Interactive map of Horton Park
- Type: Urban park
- Location: Saint Paul, Minnesota, U.S.
- Coordinates: 44°57′49″N 93°09′28″W
- Area: 1 acre (0.40 ha)
- Created: 1895
- Visitors: 10,000
- Status: Open all year

Horton Park is a small arboretum in Saint Paul, Minnesota, United States. Known primarily for its variety of trees, Horton Park has become a symbol of the Saint Paul Midway community.

== Horton Park ==
Founded in 1895 by James R. Horton, Horton Park was used for public hearings. It is now used as a popular location among local St Paul residents for picnics and general relaxation.

In 1952 Horton Park was voted "Park of the Year" by local newspaper the St. Paul Pioneer Press.

The original name of Horton Park was Long Park, due to its long tree branches.
