= Epsom Cluster =

Psychiatric hospitals

Coordinates: 51.3437°N 0.2833°W

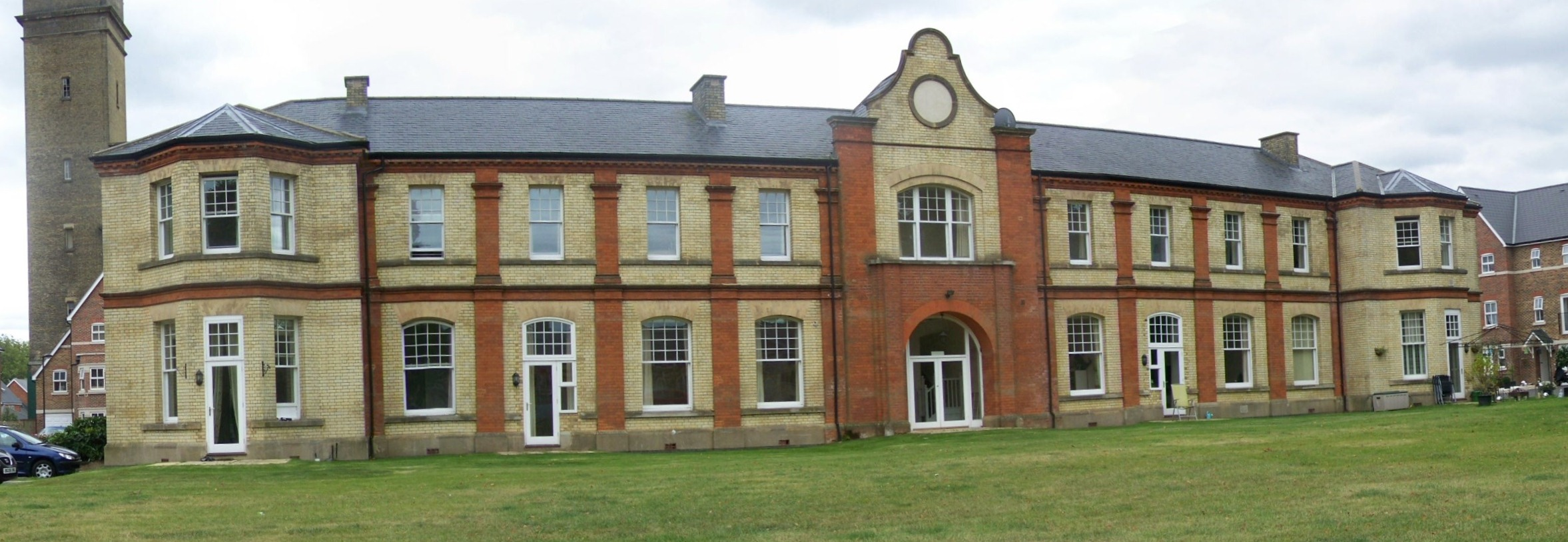
Horton Hospital former administration block in use as private apartments in 2009.

The main hall in West Park Hospital, which was left a burnt out shell after a fire on 30 September 2003.

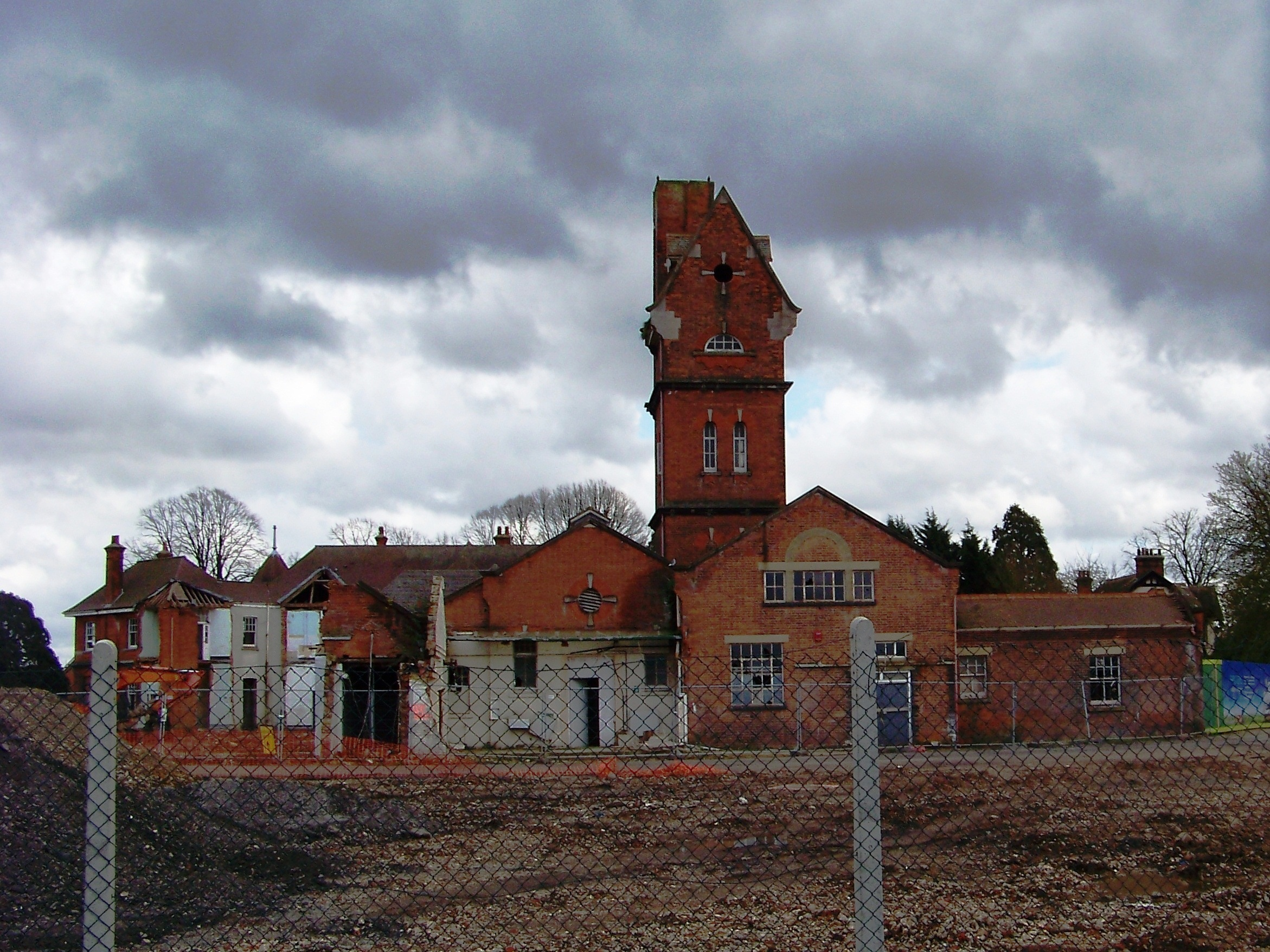
St. Ebba's Hospital undergoing partial redevelopment in 2010.

The Epsom Cluster, also referred to as the Horton Estate, was a cluster or group of five large psychiatric hospitals situated on land to the west of Epsom.

The hospitals were built by the London County Council to alleviate pressure on London's existing lunatic asylums, which had by this time become overcrowded. The County Council continued to manage them until they were nationalised, becoming part of the National Health Service in 1948.

The cluster comprised:

- Horton Hospital
- Long Grove Hospital
- Manor Hospital
- St Ebba's Hospital
- West Park Hospital

The Horton Light Railway transported building supplies and then coal and provisions to the hospitals in the cluster. The cluster was served by a central cemetery on the corner of Hook Road and Horton Lane until 1955 and a central waterworks and power station until the arrival of mains services.

== Present day ==
Following changes in the provision of mental health care, including a greater emphasis on care in the community, most of the hospitals' patients were discharged in the 1990s and early 2000s. As of 2011, much of the estate had been redeveloped for housing, including most of The Manor and Horton sites and all of Long Grove. NHS psychiatric units remained operational at St. Ebba's, Horton Haven, West Park and the Manor while redundant areas at West Park and St. Ebba's were undergoing redevelopment.
