= St Lawrence's Hospital, Caterham =

St Lawrence's Hospital
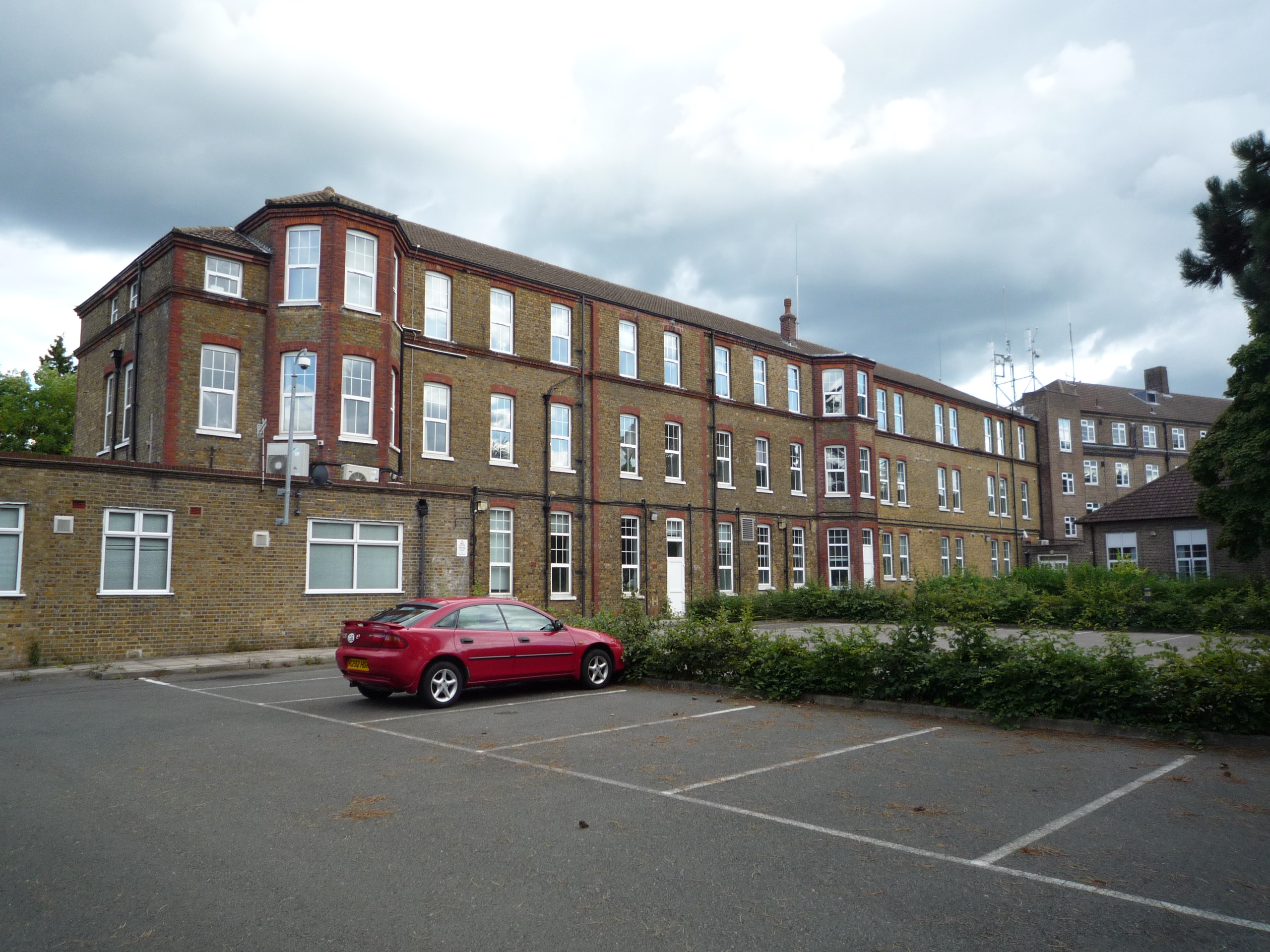
- The nurse's home at the hospital

- Shown in Surrey

Geography
- Location: Caterham, Surrey, England
- Coordinates: 51.2860°N 0.0997°W

Organisation
- Care system: National Health Service
- Type: Mental health

History
- Founded: 1870
- Closed: 1994

Links
- Lists: Hospitals in England

St Lawrence's Hospital was a mental health facility in Caterham, Surrey.

== History ==
The facility was commissioned by the Metropolitan Asylums Board and designed by John Giles. It opened as the Metropolitan Asylum for Chronic Imbeciles in 1870. A nurses' home was added to the asylum in 1889 and it became Caterham Mental Hospital in 1920.

In 1928 Joey Deacon, the author and television personality, was admitted to the hospital where he remained for the rest of his life. London County Council took administrative control of the facility in 1930. A nurse was killed when a bomb fell on the hospital in November 1940 during the Second World War. It was renamed St Lawrence's Hospital after the local parish in 1941 and it joined the National Health Service in 1948.

In 1981 Silent Minority, a documentary film made by Nigel Evans for ATV, highlighted the conditions of mental patients at the Borocourt Hospital near Reading, Berkshire and at St Lawrence's Hospital in Caterham.

After the introduction of Care in the Community in the 1980s the hospital reduced in size and closed in 1994. Most of the buildings have been demolished but the nurses' home has been converted into flats.
