= Wyfold Court =

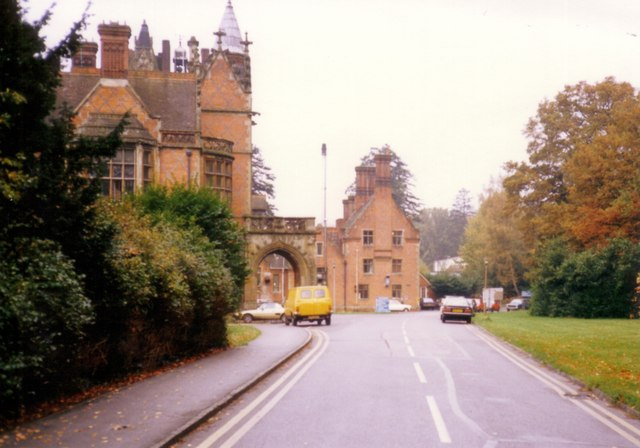
- Wyfold Court

- Shown in Oxfordshire

Geography
- Location: Rotherfield Peppard, Oxfordshire, England
- Coordinates: 51.5359°N 1.0188°W

Organisation
- Care system: National Health Service
- Type: Mental health

History
- Founded: 1932
- Closed: 1993

Wyfold Court is a country house at Rotherfield Peppard in south Oxfordshire. It is a Grade II* listed building. After use of the house as a hospital, it had been converted into apartments by the year 2000.

== History ==
The house was designed by George Somers Leigh Clarke for the Lancashire cotton magnate and Conservative politician Edward Hermon and was built between 1874 and 1884.

Wyfold Court has a 14 window range of non-uniform material, mostly of stone mullion and transom windows with "elaborate carved hoods". The building is built of scarlet brick with blue brick diapers (geometric patterns) and yellow stone details. Its style combines the Flamboyant period of French Gothic architecture with a touch of Scots Baronial. The front façade has towers with corner turrets, gargoyles and traceried windows; its garden front has mullioned bay windows and brick gable (facing roof walls) with crocketed heraldic beasts. Indoors, the main corridor is rib vaulted with staircase hall and a multi-storey wide bay window with stained glass of royal coats of arms. In the 1970s critic Jennifer Sherwood summarised its architecture as a "Nightmare Abbey".

Hermon's only daughter was Frances Caroline Hermon who married Robert Hodge. Hodge secured a seat in the Commons at the 1895 general election as MP for the Southern or Henley Division of Oxfordshire. He was created a baronet as Sir Robert Hodge of Wyfold Court in July 1902 and later ennobled as Baron Wyfold in May 1919.

After his wife died in 1929, Hodge had little use for such a large house and, in 1932, he sold it to the Government who converted it for medical use as Borocourt Hospital. It joined the National Health Service in 1948. In 1981 Silent Minority, a documentary film made by Nigel Evans for ATV, highlighted the conditions of mental patients at the Borocourt Hospital and at St Lawrence's Hospital in Caterham.

After the introduction of Care in the Community in the 1980s the hospital reduced in size and closed in 1993. By the year 2000, it was returned to residential use as apartments.

== Sources ==
- Sherwood, Jennifer; Pevsner, Nikolaus (1974). Oxfordshire. The Buildings of England. Rotherfield Peppard: Penguin Books. pp. 737–738. ISBN 0-14-071045-0.
