= Silent Minority =

- Directed by: Nigel Evans
- Written by: Nigel Evans
- Produced by: Nigel Evans
- Narrated by: Nigel Evans
- Cinematography: Alan Jones; Ron Conley
- Edited by: Peter Cannon
- Production company: Colour Productions
- Distributed by: Associated Television
- Release date: 10 June 1981 (United Kingdom)
- Running time: 60 minutes
- Country: United Kingdom
- Language: English

Silent Minority is a 1981 British documentary film made by Nigel Evans for ATV which aired in June 1981 on ITV. The film spotlights the conditions of mental patients at the Borocourt Hospital near Reading, Berkshire and the St Lawrence Hospital in Caterham, Surrey.

Part polemic, part narrative, it came just before the transition of the British mental health system from an asylum-based system to one of Care in the Community.

== Critical response ==
It was reported in the Glasgow Herald that British health officials protested the release of the documentary, and that Health Minister Sir George Young attacked the film as not being a true representation of such hospitals. ATV announced making changes to the film's commentary due to these protests, and Charles Denton of ATV stated that film director Nigel Evans admitted that hospital administrators were deceived during the project's filming, but stated that such deception was "in the public interest". Evans had been granted access to the facilities and was allowed to shoot individual patients only if he obtained consent of their family members. When some families did not consent, Evans destroyed six reels of footage, but health officials determined he deliberately concealed other footage. These officials granted that the film footage was accurate, but complained that the narration was not, thus resulting in ATV modifying the commentary. After the film's airing, it was reported that the film had already raised controversy and that it might have been seen as too "harrowing" by some viewers. Objections were raised based upon Health Ministry statements that the film presented a slanted viewpoint, but there was a concession that even if the film's examples were not typical, it was believed that they were "unlikely to be the only exceptions to an otherwise admirable system" and, even if atypical, that they exist at all "is a matter of grave concern." Producer/director Nigel Evans was praised for the film's conclusions showing that the issues can be addressed, ATV for the film's creation, and IBA for refusing to ban it.

Controversy about the film reached the British Parliament, with questions in the House addressed to Norman Fowler, Secretary of State for Social Services. Fowler, while appreciating that the film drew attention to the plight of handicapped patients within the British health system, felt that concentrating "its attention on certain categories of the most severely handicapped", gave an "unrepresentative picture both of the two hospitals and of the care given by National Health Service staff to mentally handicapped people in general." But he expanded that the concerns brought forward by the film were being addressed through the creation of smaller facilities better able to address patients' needs.
