= Sunnydown School =

Location
- Portley House, 152 Whyteleafe Road; Caterham, Surrey, CR3 5ED; England; 51°17′41″N 0°05′06″W

Information
- Type: Community school
- Local authority: Surrey County Council
- Department for Education URN: 125458 Tables
- Ofsted: Reports
- Headteacher: Richard Woolley
- Gender: Boys
- Age: 11 to 16
- Enrolment: 82
- Colour: Green
- Website: http://www.sunnydown.surrey.sch.uk/

Sunnydown School is a special secondary school situated in the town of Caterham in Surrey, England. Founded in 1949, it is the second-oldest special school in Surrey. The school educates students aged 11 to 16.

== Organisation ==
The school is classed as a community special school and has an average intake of 20 students annually. It is located in the civil parish of Caterham on the Hill and right next to de Stafford School. It also touches the southwestern part of the London Borough of Croydon.

The school acts as a stepping stone from primary education to further education colleges. Students at Sunnydown take 8 GCSE exams along with the ASDAN bronze award in Year 10 onwards and The Duke of Edinburgh's Award. Pupils at the school follow a set of guidelines set by the staff in order to develop their independence and also prepare them for higher education and potential employment. Around half of the students at the school attended the boarding side of the school before boarding ended in 2021.

== Guildford origins ==
Sunnydown School was originally founded in 1949 on the Hog's Back at Guildford, before relocating to Portley House in Caterham in 1983.

== Portley House ==
The school's main building, Portley House, was built in 1856 for a wine merchant, Charles Dingwall. Since then the building has had various extensions added, and in 1951 it became a school for the deaf named Portley House Boarding Special School. Recent additions to the school include a new Science Room in 2001, a new gym and practical cooking room in 2010 and more recently, a two-storey classroom block to replace two prefabricated classroom blocks. A new £20,000 'sensory room' was opened by sports broadcaster John Inverdale in October 2017.

== Students ==
A significant majority of students at the school are diagnosed with a form of autism spectrum disorder. The school deals with those who have speech and language disorders as well. The school deals with those with varying levels of disability and suits the learning environment to those. The catchment area of Sunnydown is very wide, taking people from Tandridge and as far as Woking and Surrey Heath whilst in the borders of Surrey.

== Headteachers ==
Headteacher	Years in office
Moore Armstrong	1989 – July 2014
Paul Jensen	September 2014 – August 2025
Terri Wyse	September 2025 - December 2025
Richard Woolley	December 2025 – present

== Statistics ==
OFSTED periodic inspection grade ^{(1 = excellent 4 = inadequate)}
Year	Rating
2023	1
2021	2
2016	2
2012	1
2009	1
2005	2
