= Roy Griffiths =

British businessman (1926-1994)

Sir Ernest Roy Griffiths
- Born: 1926
- Died: 1994 (aged 67–68)
- Occupation: Businessman

Sir Ernest Roy Griffiths (8 July 1926 – 28 March 1994) was a British businessman. He was a director of Monsanto Europe (1964–68), and a director and deputy chairman of J. Sainsbury plc (1968–91).

He was engaged by Margaret Thatcher in 1983 to produce a report on the management of the National Health Service (NHS) and went on to be deputy chairman of the NHS Management Board (1986–89) and adviser to the government on the NHS (1986–94). He recommended, "The Secretary of State should set up, within DHSS and the existing statutory framework, a Health Services Supervisory Board and a full-time NHS Management Board" and that general managers should be introduced throughout the NHS.

In 1985, he was knighted for "services to the National Health Service". He produced a report on Care in the Community in 1987.
