= Care in the Community =

British health policy

Care in the Community (also called "Community Care" or "Domiciliary Care") is a British policy of deinstitutionalisation, treating and caring for physically and mentally disabled people in their homes rather than in an institution. Institutional care was the target of widespread criticism during the 1960s and 1970s, but it was not until 1983 that the government of Margaret Thatcher adopted a new policy of care after the Audit Commission published a report called 'Making a Reality of Community Care' which outlined the advantages of domiciliary care.

== History ==
Although this policy has been attributed to the Margaret Thatcher government in the 1980s, community care was not a new idea. As a policy it had been around since the early 1950s and the 1961 Water Tower speech of Enoch Powell. Its general aim was a cheaper, more cost-effective way of helping people with mental health problems and physical disabilities, by removing them from impersonal, often Victorian, institutions, and caring for them in their own homes. Since the 1950s various governments had been attracted to the policy of community care. Despite support for the policy, the number of in-patients in large hospitals and residential establishments continued to increase. At the same time, public opinion was gradually turned against long-stay institutions by allegations from the media.

In the 1960s Barbara Robb put together a series of accounts in a book called Sans Everything and she used this to launch a campaign to improve or else close long stay facilities. Shortly after this, the brutality and poor care being meted out in Ely Hospital, a long stay hospital for the mentally handicapped in Cardiff, was exposed by a nurse writing to the News of the World. This exposure prompted an official enquiry. Its findings were highly critical of conditions, staff morale and management. Rather than bury this report it was leaked to the papers by the then Secretary of State for Health Richard Crossman, who hoped to obtain increased resources for the health service.

Following the situation at Ely Hospital a series of scandals in mental hospitals hit the headlines. All told similar stories of abuse and inhumane treatment of patients who were out of sight and out of mind of the public, hidden away in institutions. At the same time Michael Ignatieff and Peter Townsend both published books which exposed the poor quality of care within certain institutions. The 1981 ITV documentary Silent Minority which spotlighted the conditions of mental patients at the Borocourt Hospital near Reading, Berkshire and the St Lawrence Hospital in Caterham, Surrey brought the issue into the public eye.

In the 1980s there was increasing criticism and concern about the quality of long term care for dependent people. There was also concern about the experiences of people leaving long term institutional care and being left to fend for themselves in the community. Yet the government was committed to the idea of 'care in the community'. In 1986 the Audit Commission published a report called 'Making a Reality of Community Care'. This report outlined the slow progress in resettling people from long stay hospitals. It was this report which prompted the subsequent Green and White papers on community care.

=== The Griffiths Report: 'Community Care: Agenda for Action' ===
Sir Roy Griffiths had already been invited by Margaret Thatcher to produce a report on the problems of the NHS. This report was influenced by the ideology of managerialism - the idea that problems could be solved by 'management'. Griffiths firmly believed that many of the problems facing the Welfare State were caused by the lack of strong effective leadership and management. Because of his previous work, which was greatly admired by the Prime Minister, Griffiths was asked to examine the whole system of community care. In 1988 he produced a report or a Green Paper called 'Community Care: Agenda for Action', also known as The Griffiths Report.

The Griffiths Report Proposed a solution to the issue of 'no-man's land' - the grey area between health and social services which included the long term or continuing care of dependent groups such as older people, the disabled and the mentally ill. In 1988 Griffiths said that community care was everybody's distant cousin but nobody's baby - meaning that community care was not working because no one wanted to accept the responsibility for community care.

Community Care: Agenda for Action made six key recommendations for action:

1. Minister of State for Community Care to ensure implementation of the policy - it required ministerial authority.
2. Local Authorities should have key role in community care. i.e. Social Work / Services departments rather than Health have responsibility for long term and continuing care. Health Boards to have responsibility for primary and acute care.
3. Specific grant from central government to fund development of community care.
4. Specified what Social Service Departments should do: assess care needs of locality, set up mechanisms to assess care needs of individuals, on basis of needs - design 'flexible packages of care' to meet these needs
5. Promote the use of the Independent sector: this was to be achieved by social work departments collaborating with and making maximum use of the voluntary and private sector of welfare.
6. Social Services should be responsible for registration and inspection of all residential homes whether run by private organisations or the local authority.

The majority of long term care was already being provided by Social Services, but Griffiths proposed putting community nursing staff under the control of local authority rather than Health Boards. This, however, never actually happened. The Griffiths Report on Community Care seemed to back local government whereas, the health board reforms in the same period, actually strengthened central government control.

=== 1989 white paper Caring for People ===
In 1989 the government published its response to the Griffiths Report in the White Paper Caring for People: Community Care in the next Decade and Beyond. This was a companion paper to Working for Patients and shared the same general principles:

- A belief that state provision was bureaucratic and inefficient. That the state should be an 'enabler' rather than a provider of care. The UK state at this time was funding, providing and purchasing care for the population
- Separation of the purchaser / provider roles
- Devolution of budgets and budgetary control

=== Caring for People key objectives ===
The White Paper followed the main recommendations of the Griffiths Report but with two notable exceptions:

- The White Paper did not propose a Minister of Community Care
- It did not offer a new system of earmarked funds for social care along the lines advised by Griffiths.

It did however; identify six key objectives which differed slightly from Griffiths Report:

- New funding structure
- Promotion of the independent sector
- Agency responsibilities clearly defined
- Development of needs assessment and care management
- Promotion of domiciliary, day and respite care
- Development of practical support for carers

These objectives were legislated for in the National Health Service and Community Care Act 1990.

== Aims of the policy ==
The main aim of community care policy has always been to maintain individuals in their own homes wherever possible, rather than provide care in a long-stay institution or residential establishment. It was almost taken for granted that this policy was the best option from a humanitarian and moral perspective. It was also thought to be cheaper.

The Guillebaud Committee, reporting in 1956, summed up the assumption underlying policy. It suggested that:

Policy should aim at making adequate provision wherever possible for the care and treatment of old people in their own homes. The development of domiciliary services will be a genuine economy measure and also a humanitarian measure enabling people to lead the life they much prefer

Three key objectives of Community Care policy:

- The overriding objective was to cap public expenditure on independent sector residential and nursing home care. This was achieved in that local authorities became responsible for operating a needs-based yet cash-limited system.
- There was a clear agenda about developing a mixed economy of care, i.e. a variety of providers. The mixed economy provision in residential and nursing home care has been maintained despite the social security budget being capped. There are also now many independent organisations providing domiciliary care services.
- To redefine the boundaries between health and social care. Much of the continuing care of elderly and disabled people was provided by the NHS. Now much of that has been re-defined as social care and is the responsibility of local authorities. Whereas NHS services are free, social services have to be paid for.

== Impact of the reforms ==
The community care reforms outlined in the 1990 Act came into effect in April 1993. They have been evaluated but no clear conclusions have been reached. A number of authors have been highly critical of the reforms. Hadley and Clough (1996) claim the reforms 'have created care in chaos' (Hadley and Clough 1996), claiming the reforms have been inefficient, unresponsive, and have offered no choice or equity.

Means and Smith (1998) also claim that the reforms:

- introduced a system that is no better than the previous more bureaucratic systems of resource allocation
- were an excellent idea, but received little understanding or commitment from social services as the lead agency in community care
- the enthusiasm of local authorities was undermined by vested professional interests, or the service legacy of the last forty years
- health services and social services workers have not worked well together and there have been few 'multidisciplinary' assessments carried out
- in reality little collaboration took place except at senior management level
- the reforms have been undermined by chronic underfunding by central government
- the voluntary sector was the main beneficiary of this attempt to develop a "mixed economy of care"

== Mental health and community care ==
Under the National Health Service and Community Care Act 1990, people with mental health problems were able to remain in their own homes whilst undergoing treatment. This situation raised some concerns when acts of violence were perpetrated against members of the public by people who had previously been in psychiatric hospitals. Research by King's College London in 2013 showed that psychiatric patients are three times as likely to be victims of crime than the general public, but a small minority can be violent and be a threat to the public.

The National Health Service and Community Care Act 1990 was passed so that patients could be individually assessed, and assigned a specific care worker. If people presented a risk they were to be placed on a Supervision Register. There have been problems with patients "slipping through the net" and ending up homeless on the street. There have also been arguments between Health and Social Services departments over who should pay.

In January 1998, the then Labour Health Secretary, Frank Dobson, said the care in the community programme launched by the Conservatives had failed.

As Simon Duffy and others have emphasised, needs assessments were often distorted so a person's "needs" were interpreted to fit the available resources. The development of personal budgets, where the person was given control of resources, rather than provided with services, was intended to tackle this problem.

By 2026, 570 people had been murdered by people with mental health issues. Almost all of the 528 killers were known to police and the NHS, and some three quarters had stopped taking their medication.

== Winterbourne View Panorama ==
BBC Panorama in 2011 filmed a fly-on-the-wall documentary at Winterbourne View, which was a private long-term hospital for people with learning disability. This was done in response to disclosures of alleged abuse and of a failure of the authorities, including the regulator to take action on reports of abuse.

The broadcast programme showed physical and verbal abuse of people, a culture of frustration and boredom, and lack of any structured treatment for the inpatients.

After this, health authorities promised to reduce the number of placements in large units where people were cared for inadequately, far from home, and on a long term basis. It was planned to have a reduction in the number of these placements, with alternative more satisfactory small scale services provided. However, after four years, the Bubb report highlighted that there had been little change, and proposed the way forward for service improvement. It advocated listening to, and empowering people with disability and their families, and the use of smaller, more local services with different kinds of funding.

In March 2015 Norman Lamb, the Minister of State for Care and Support launched a twelve-week consultation process on how the changes to services should be implemented. While welcomed by most, others saw progress as lamentably slow on the identified issues for what amounts to community care for people with learning disability and autism. Margaret Hodge, chair of the Public Accounts Committee, on hearing the outlined plans of the health service on these proposed changes, said:

″Why can't we just get on and do it? To say it's going to go into a green paper fills me with horror. It suggests to me that our successors will be sitting round the table in a couple of years’ time having the same conversation.”
