= Joey Deacon =

British author (1920–1981)

Joseph John Deacon
- Born: 24 May 1920; Camberwell, London
- Died: 3 December 1981 (aged 61); Caterham, Surrey
- Other name: Joey
- Occupation: Author

Joseph John Deacon (24 May 1920 – 3 December 1981) was a British author and disability advocate.

== Biography ==
Deacon was born with severe cerebral palsy, a neurological condition that left him with neuromuscular spasticity that particularly affected his arms and legs. Deacon's condition resulted in significant muscular tonus, a tendency for muscular flexion of arms and extension of legs. This virtually prevented fine motor control in his hands, arms and legs. Although Deacon could walk with assistance, he mostly used a wheelchair. Deacon's speech was also unintelligible to most, with the exception of his closest friends.

Deacon was institutionalised as a child and later made shoes in sheltered accommodation. As he was unable to communicate freely, he was mistakenly perceived to be "mentally subnormal" by some peers. However, with the help of his friends Ernie Roberts, Tom Blackburn and Michael Sangster, Deacon was able to write an autobiography, titled Tongue Tied (1974), which was published by the charity Mencap as part of their Subnormality in the Seventies series. The book provided insight into the lives of those with physical disabilities. With royalties raised from book sales and donations, Deacon and his friends purchased a home that they would be able to reside in.

== Early life ==
Deacon's mother believed him to be mentally able: she would ask him to count the motor cars passing their house, to which Joey would respond by blinking for each car that passed. During his childhood in the hospital, he proved his intelligence several times in tests, using non-verbal communication, such as blinking or pointing with his nose.

Beginning at age four, Deacon underwent several surgical operations on his legs at St Childe's Hospital but these failed to improve his mobility. His mother died of tuberculosis when he was eight. Joey was then cared for by his grandmother but was soon after admitted to Queen Mary's Hospital in Carshalton for more operations. These proving ineffective, he was transferred six months later to St Lawrence's Hospital, Caterham, where he remained for the rest of his life. He remained in close contact with his father until his father's death.

== Tongue Tied ==
In 1970, Deacon began to write his autobiography with three friends. Ernie Roberts, who also had cerebral palsy, had been in hospital since the age of ten and was able to understand Deacon's speech. Roberts listened to Deacon's dictation and repeated it to another patient, Michael Sangster, who wrote it down in longhand. After proof-reading by Chris Ring, a student who visited the team each week, it was typed by a fourth member of the team, Tom Blackburn, who was initially unable to read or write but taught himself to type in order to help. The forty-four page book took fourteen months to write. BBC Radio 4's Woman's Hour ran a feature on Deacon and his manuscript, and the resultant publicity led to BBC Television's Horizon programme making a two hour documentary of Deacon's life broadcast in December 1974.

== Later life ==
The four men formed an inseparable friendship in the hospital for decades, and in 1974 their relationship was the subject of a Prix Italia and BAFTA award-winning drama documentary for British television's Horizon written by Elaine Morgan and directed by Brian Gibson, entitled Joey. This was followed by a second documentary made for Blue Peter.

As soon as Tongue Tied was completed, the team started work on a second book. Deacon wanted to write a work of fiction: a novel about a disabled man who was desperate to learn to walk so that he could walk up the aisle and marry his girlfriend. It was never published.

Royalties from Tongue Tied and donations raised enough money for the four to move to a bungalow on the Caterham hospital grounds in 1979, where they were able to live more independently. After Deacon died two years later at 61, Blackburn and Roberts moved to a house outside the grounds, where they lived with the assistance of support workers.

== Blue Peter and cultural impact ==
In 1981, during the last year of his life, Deacon was featured on the children's television magazine programme Blue Peter for the International Year of the Disabled. He was presented as an example of a person who had achieved a lot in spite of his disabilities.

Despite the sensitive way in which Blue Peter covered his life, the impact on the public was not entirely as intended. The sights and sounds of Deacon's distinctive speech and mannerisms were picked up on by children and he quickly became a figure of ridicule in school playgrounds across the country, the term "Joey" being used as an insult for a person perceived to be stupid.

== Posthumous impact ==
In 1982, Deacon's story was the subject of a paper by D. Ellis in the journal Developmental Medicine & Child Neurology, describing how after fifty years' residence in an institution for mentally disabled people, a new strategy was devised by which Deacon's intelligence could be assessed; the strategy revealed that he had normal intelligence.

In 2020, 100 years after Joey Deacon's birth, a charity called the Deacon Centre was established in his adopted home town of Caterham to recognise and continue his legacy. The centre provides 'creativity spaces' for people with mental and communication disabilities in the local area with a programme of activities including creative writing, music, art, and drama.

== Bibliography ==
- Deacon, Joey (1974). Tongue Tied. Fifty years of friendship in a subnormality hospital, National Society for Mentally Handicapped Children, ISBN 0-85537-017-3
- Deacon, Joey (Reprint). Tongue Tied. Fifty years of friendship in a subnormality hospital, Mencap Publications, ISBN 0-85537-077-7
