= Rotherfield Peppard =

Village in Oxfordshire, England

Coordinates: 51°31′44″N 0°58′37″W

Rotherfield Peppard: Peppard
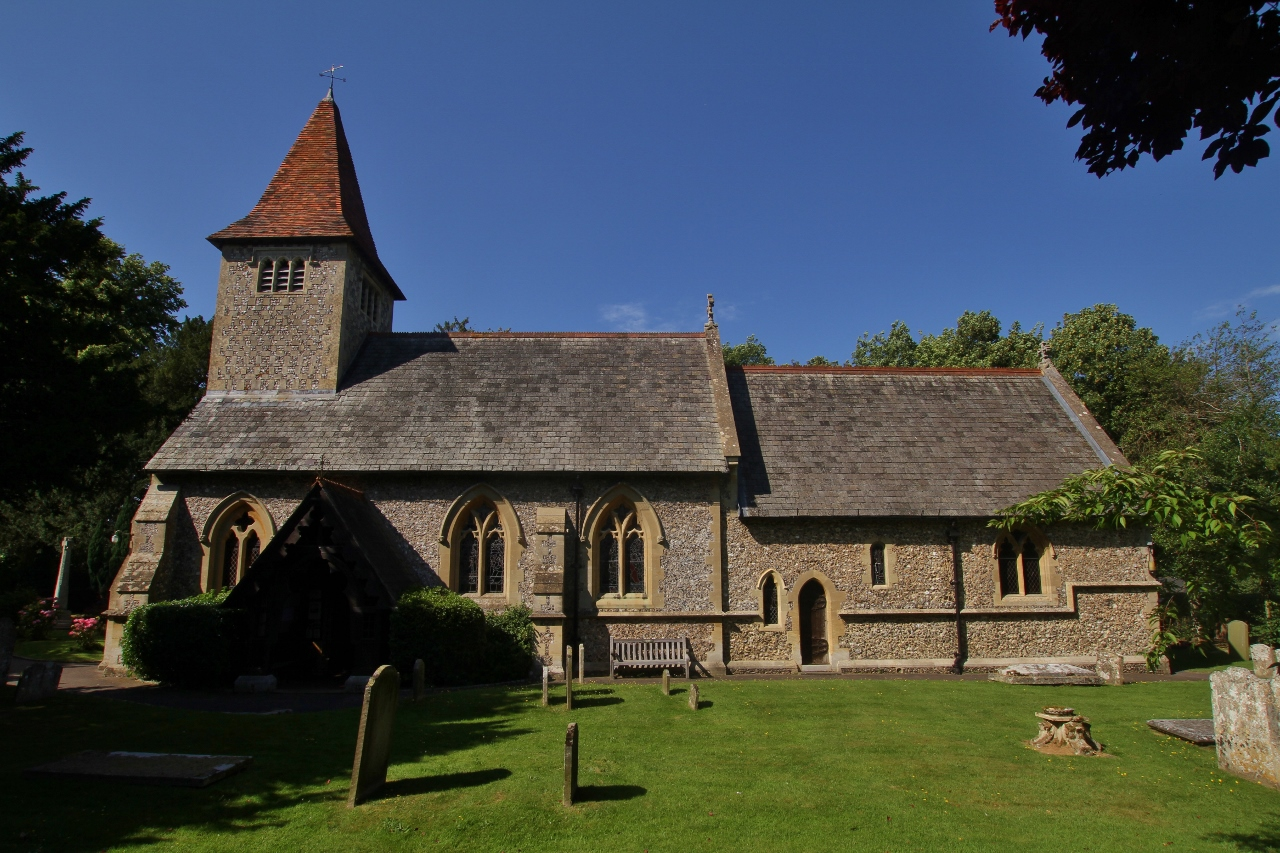
- All Saints' parish church

- Location within Oxfordshire
- Area: 7.73 km^{2} (2.98 sq mi)
- Population: 1,649 (2011 Census)
  - Density: 213/km^{2} (550/sq mi)
- OS grid reference: SU710815
- Civil parish: Rotherfield Peppard
- District: South Oxfordshire
- Shire county: Oxfordshire
- Region: South East
- Country: England
- Sovereign state: United Kingdom
- Post town: HENLEY-ON-THAMES
- Postcode district: RG9
- Dialling code: 01491
- Police: Thames Valley
- Fire: Oxfordshire
- Ambulance: South Central
- UK Parliament: Henley and Thame
- Website: Rotherfield Peppard Parish Council

Rotherfield Peppard (often referred to simply as Peppard by locals) is a village and civil parish in the Chiltern Hills in South Oxfordshire. It is centred 3 miles (5 km) west of Henley-on-Thames, 4 1/2 miles (7 km) north of Reading, Berkshire and 1 mile (1.6 km) southwest of Rotherfield Greys. The 2011 Census recorded the parish population as 1,649. The area includes Peppard Hill, which is 1/2 mile (800 m) west of the centre of the village and adjoins Sonning Common. Peppard Common is public woodland and meadow in between in a ravine. The far east of the parish is a golf course and the far west is Kingwood Common which is also wooded common land. In 1951, Elizabeth Goudge (1900–1984), novelist and winner of the Newberry Award for Best Children's Book (The White Horse), moved to Rotherfield Peppard, where she lived until her death. A blue plaque, unveiled in 2008, identifies her home.

== Toponym ==
Rotherfield derives from the Old English redrefeld meaning "cattle lands". In the middle of the area is the open-to-the-public land, Peppard Common, once used for grazing and which can be used by parishioners for small timber.

== Church and chapel ==
The Church of England parish church of All Saints was Norman, but was almost completely rebuilt in 1874. All Saints' is a Grade II* listed building. The ecclesiastical parish has become part of the united benefice of Rotherfield Peppard, Kidmore End and Sonning Common. Providence Chapel was founded in 1795. It later became Peppard Congregational Church. It is now Springwater Congregational Church.

== Social and economic history ==
Blount's Court is an early 19th-century house with neoclassical features, including a 15th-century doorway and 16th-century panelling. It was the childhood home of Francis Knollys, 1st Viscount Knollys and is now the Johnson Matthey Technology Centre. Wyfold Court was designed by Somers Clarke and built in 1872–78 for the Lancashire cotton magnate and Conservative politician Edward Hermon (1822–81). It is a Grade II* listed building.

Early in the 20th century a local man, Bert Butler, operated a bus business called the Peppard and District Motor Service. This seems to have ceased operating in the First World War. In April 1918 the Reading Branch of British Automobile Traction (BAT) started a bus service between Peppard Common and Reading on a trial basis using petrol-engined buses. This was short-lived due to wartime petrol rationing and was discontinued in May 1918. BAT later reinstated the service, and from October 1919 extended it to Stoke Row. Reading Buses Pink 25 route now serves Peppard Common.

The village has thrice been used for settings in the television drama series Midsomer Murders and also for many of the scenes (including the eponymous house) in the Merchant Ivory Productions film Howards End. There was formerly a Peppard Football Club that played in the Combined Counties Football League in the 1990s and Hellenic Football League in the early 2000s until it disbanded.

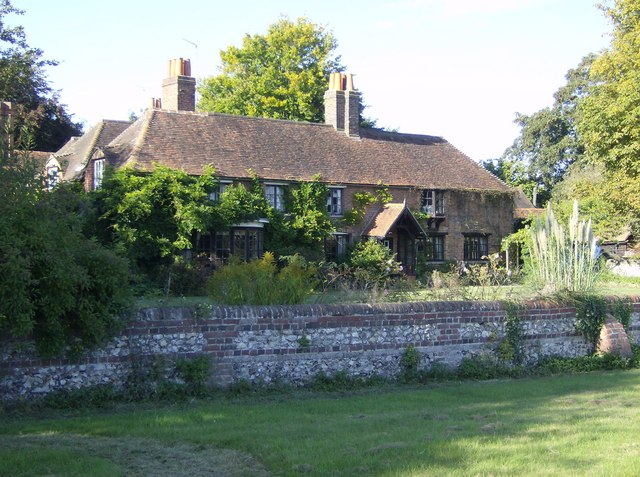
Peppard Cottage was used as filming location for Howards End

== Amenities ==
The civil parish council keeps updated a map of all of the amenities of the area. The village has a Church of England-sponsored primary school, Pubs in the parish are the Greyhound Inn Gallowstree Road, the Red Lion in at Peppard Common and the Unicorn at Kingwood. Peppard has a village shop, a horticultural training and garden centre and a pet shop. Also in the parish are a sports field and pavilion, a lawn tennis club and an RDA equestrian centre for people with disabilities.

== Sources ==
- Lacey, Paul (1990). Thames Valley the British Years: 1915–1920. Wokingham: Paul Lacey. pp. 18, 26. ISBN 0-9510739-3-1.
- Sherwood, Jennifer; Pevsner, Nikolaus (1974). Oxfordshire. The Buildings of England. Rotherfield Peppard: Penguin Books. pp. 737–738. ISBN 0-14-071045-0.
- Townley, Simon C, ed. (2011). A History of the County of Oxford, Volume 16: Binfield Hundred (Part One): Henley-on-Thames and Environs. Victoria County History. Woodbridge: Boydell and Brewer. ISBN 978-1-904356-38-7.
