= De Stafford School =

de Stafford School

Location
- Burntwood Lane; Caterham, Surrey, CR3 5YX; England; 51°17′35″N 0°05′05″W

Information
- Type: Academy
- Motto: Grow, Learn, Believe and Achieve
- Established: 1804
- Local authority: Surrey County Council
- Trust: GLF Schools
- Department for Education URN: 143808 Tables
- Ofsted: Reports
- Gender: Mixed
- Age: 11 to 16
- Enrolment: 792
- Colours: Black and red
- Website: www.destafford.org.uk

de Stafford School is a mixed secondary school located in Caterham, Surrey, England. The school educates students from ages 11 to 16.

== Organisation ==
de Stafford is close to the centre of the scattered town of Caterham, bordering on two sides the south-western part of the London Borough of Croydon.

Previously a foundation school administered by Surrey County Council, in December 2016 de Stafford School converted to academy status. The school is now sponsored by GLF Schools.

The school employs more than 100 academic and facilities/administration support staff. It currently has an average intake of 180 students per year. Acting as a preliminary school to more advanced, applied or theoretical studies at further education colleges, the nearest such state-supported institutions are in Purley, Croydon and Redhill. The school helps students in their final year to apprentice at a skilled trade or profession.

The school has access to a large sports centre (shared with Tandridge Trust), complete with a 25m swimming pool and an air-conditioned sports hall.

== History ==
A parish school was opened in 1804. After enlargements this was superseded by Caterham County Council school that was built in 1872 and enlarged in 1893 and 1909. The school has its origins in this institution and derives its name from a wealthy and politically influential mediaeval noble who owned one of the manors of the former village in 1372, Ralph de Stafford, 1st Earl of Stafford, whose wealthy wife Margaret de Audley, 2nd Baroness Audley owned as co-heir a large set of estates before their marriage, including this land.

== Students ==
The make-up of students varies according to a wide set of catchment areas drawing on parts of the London Borough of Croydon, Tandridge District and a small part of the Borough of Reigate and Banstead. In 2011 the proportion of students with learning difficulties and/or disabilities was below average, however it was above average when compared with students with a Statement of Special Educational Needs. In 2013 6.4% of children at the school did not list English as their primary language.

== In statistics ==
Ofsted periodic inspection grade (1 = excellent 4 = inadequate)
Year	Rating
2015	2
2011	2
2007	3
2003	3

Due to a franchised sixth form in Purley included in the roll in 2003, the number of students at the time of that inspection was 990.

Percentage of students achieving 5+ A*-C GCSEs (or equivalent) including English and maths	2009	2010	2011	2012
School	43%	53%	50%	54%
Local Authority	58.8%	62%	63.5%	64.2%
England	49.8%	53.5%	59%	59.4%

== Head teachers ==
Headteacher	Years in office
John Gribbon
Gerry Wadwa
Mark Phillips	September 2004 – April 2010
Caroline Longhurst	April 2010 – February 2013
Keith Sharp	February 2013 – July 2013
Jeremy Garner	September 2013 – current

== Transport ==
The school is connected by bus to the most significant residential estates of the settlements surrounding Caterham and to the largest mixed use urban areas, such as Croydon, Coulsdon and Purley town centres. The school also connects to the north and north-west via Caterham.
