= Nigel Randell Evans =

British filmmaker and author (1943–2014)

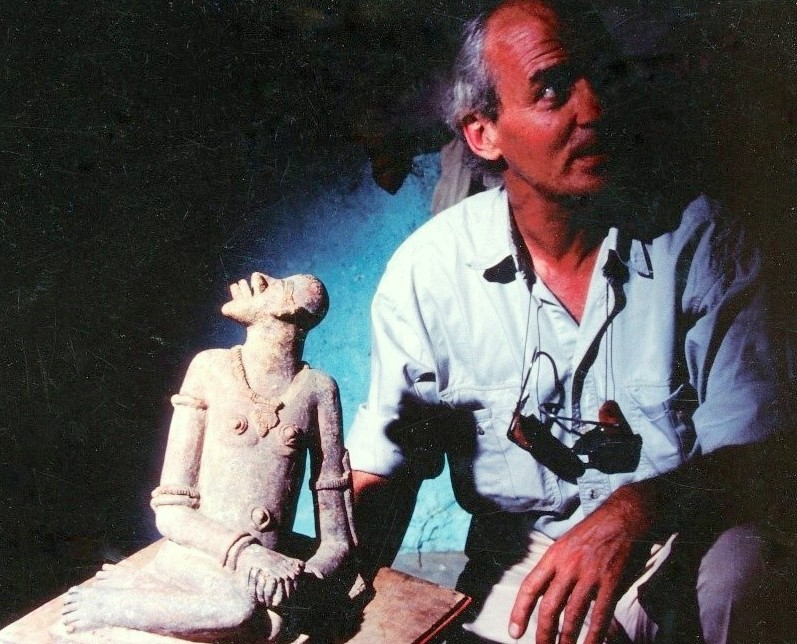
- Evans with a statue (1992)
- Born: 1943
- Died: 2014 (aged 70–71)

Nigel Randell Evans (often credited simply as Nigel Evans) (1943–2014) was a British author, campaigner for people with disabilities and film maker, with over forty social documentaries to his credit, including Walter, the feature film screened on the inaugural night of the United Kingdom's Channel 4.

== Biography ==
Nigel Randell Evans was the eldest son of Air Chief Marshal Sir Donald Randell Evans (1912–1975) and Pauline Evans.

In 1973, he was awarded a Churchill Fellowship to explore new approaches to raising public awareness to the plight of marginalised people. As a result, he founded a charity, One-to-One, that aspired to break the marginalisation of people in mental hospitals. His campaigning work with people with disabilities was a regular theme in his film making since the start of his career at the beginning of the 1970s.

He subsequently made over forty social documentaries, including Silent Minority (1981), which received national attention in the United Kingdom with its exposure of the neglect and abuse of patients in British mental hospitals.

When Channel 4 was launched in 1982, as the fourth national television service in the United Kingdom, joining the two public BBC channels and commercial network ITV, his film ‘Walter’, directed by Stephen Frears and starring Ian McKellen, was the feature film on its inaugural night. His film of 1983, The Skin Horse, a film essay exploring the sexual and emotional needs of people with a disability, won Channel 4 its first Royal Television Society Award.

The film's other awards include the Peabody Awards from the University of Georgia. He was commissioned by Channel Four to make its first documentary drama in sign language, Pictures in the Mind, in April 1987.

In December 1995, Evans was asked to make the BBC's contribution to World Aids Day. The resulting film, "The Age of Innocence", was reviewed in the Times as "the best programme yet made about Aids in this country". He marked his retirement from television in 1996 with a celebration of life for the over sixties, Grey Sex

After two decades of film making, he then qualified as a psycho-geriatric social worker in the mid-1990s, and practised in West London. His first book, The White Headhunter, an historical study of castaway John (Jack) Renton in the Pacific's Solomon Islands, was published in 2003, under the name Nigel Randell. Republished in 2020 as "Jack Renton: The 19th-century sailor who became a South Seas headhunter" under Nigel Randell Evans. He published his second Pacific book, Boys from the Sky – the curious genesis of the world’s first ethnography, also as Nigel Randell, in 2013.

Evans retired to the Pacific island of Tonga.

== Selected filmography ==
- 1975 Seeds of a New Life. British Broadcasting Corporation (BBC)
- 1977 Dismantling a Dream. Independent Television (ITV)
- 1978 Memories of Violence ITV
- 1980 We're Outsiders Now. ITV
- 1981 Silent Minority ITV
- 1982 Walter, Channel 4 (Ch4)
- 1983 The Skin Horse Ch4
- 1984 Taking the Lid Off ITV
- 1986 In the Name of Charity ITV
- 1986 The Madness Museum Ch4
- 1987 Pictures in the Mind Ch4
- 1987 Borderland ITV
- 1988 Monsters and Rainbows BBC
- 1989 Catching Alight Ch4
- 1990 The Fifth Gospel BBC
- 1990 The African King Ch4
- 1991 Fantastic Invasion BBC
- 1992 Cowboys in the South Pacific BBC
- 1992 A Different Hand Ch4
- 1993 Excuse Me for Living Ch4
- 1994 The Widowmakers Ch4
- 1995 The End of Innocence BBC
- 1996 Grey Sex BBC

Non fiction books (published under the name Nigel Randell):

- The White Headhunter. Constable /Carroll & Graf, New York (2003) ISBN 978-0786714599
- Boy from the Sky – the curious genesis of the world’s first ethnography. Thistle Press. Bellevue (2013). ISBN 978-1909609112
