= Caterham =

Town in Surrey, England

Coordinates: 51.2803°N 0.0816°W

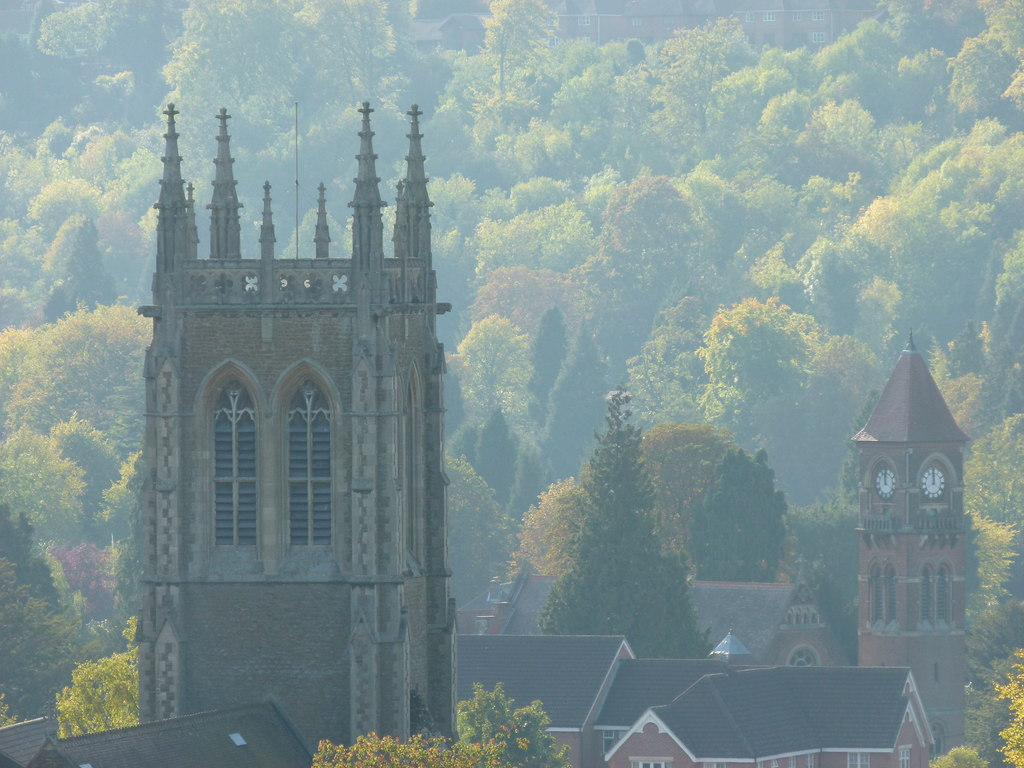
- Caterham Valley's two churches: St. John the Evangelist in the foreground and the URC in the background

- Location within Surrey
- Area: 9.41 km^{2} (3.63 sq mi)
- Population: 21,030 (2011 census)
  - Density: 2,235/km^{2} (5,790/sq mi)
- OS grid reference: TQ3456
- Civil parish: Caterham on the Hill; Caterham Valley
- District: Tandridge
- Shire county: Surrey
- Region: South East
- Country: England
- Sovereign state: United Kingdom
- Post town: Caterham
- Postcode district: CR3
- Dialling code: 01883
- Police: Surrey
- Fire: Surrey
- Ambulance: South East Coast
- UK Parliament: East Surrey

Caterham (/ˈkeɪtərəm/) is a town in the Tandridge district of Surrey, England. The town is administratively divided into two: Caterham on the Hill, and Caterham Valley, which includes the main town centre in the middle of a dry valley but rises to equal heights to the south. The town lies close to the A22, 21 miles (34 kilometres) from Guildford and 6 miles (10 kilometres) south of Croydon, in an upper valley cleft into the dip slope of the North Downs. Caterham on the Hill is above the valley to the west.

The town is particularly associated with being the location of the original factory for the Caterham 7 and for being the location of Caterham School, the estate of which lies on the outskirts of Caterham Valley.

== History ==
An encampment on the top of White Hill, in Caterham Valley south of Caterham School, between Bletchingley and the town centre is called The Cardinal's Cap which was excavated and inspected in designating it a Scheduled Ancient Monument. With close ramparts forming two or more lines, archaeologists describe the fort as a "large multivallate hillfort at War Coppice Camp".

Its inner bank is about 0.5m wide and 0.4m high with a ditch 7m wide and 0.3m deep situated 2m below its crest. To the west of the ditch is the second bank, 8m wide and 0.5m high. Beyond this the second ditch has become completely infilled over the years but survives as a buried feature approximately 8m wide, visible as a terrace. Traces of a second, slighter terrace are situated further down the slope, representing evidence of additional scarping. The defences to the north east include an inner bank 5m wide and up to 0.5m high from the interior and 4m high from the exterior with a surrounding ditch 8m wide and 0.6m deep. Beyond this is a counterscarp bank 6m wide and up to 1m high. A 35m long section of a second ditch, which has become partially infilled over the years, survives 25m further out to the north east. In the southern and south eastern areas of the monument, sections of the hillfort have been disturbed by later quarrying activity. Although the monument was originally thought to be either Roman or Neolithic in date, excavations in 1950 showed it to be Iron Age and what had previously been thought to be a fragment of an earthwork was almost complete with the banks of the ramparts having been palisaded and revetted to strengthen their defence.

The town lies within the Anglo-Saxon feudal division of Tandridge hundred.

=== Toponymy ===
The origin of the name Caterham is disputed and unknown. One theory is that it derives from the Primitive Welsh word cadeir meaning chair and the Old English hām meaning village. This could be in reference to a chair-shaped hill. Other theories derive it from the Old English cattahām or cattehām meaning 'Catta's settlement' or 'settlement of the cats'.

=== Post Norman Conquest ===
Caterham's church of St Lawrence is of Norman construction and retains a rector as its incumbent. In the reign of King John, Roger son of Everard de Gaist gave this including its church lands to the monastery of Waltham Holy Cross. Everard's grandfather was Geoffery of Caterham who gave land to his son in the 12th century. This monastery ran the glebe as a manor, receiving a grant of free warren in their demesne lands of Caterham in 1253; holding it until the dissolution of the monasteries.

Caterham's original village centre consisted in the nearest part of the ridge of Caterham on the Hill to the railway station in Caterham Valley, including at the street ascending the relatively steep, short hill, Church Hill. Although no conservation area has been designated in either civil parish, four secular buildings, including The King and Queen public house, three churches as well as a vault and tomb in St Lawrence's churchyard are listed; these are along Hill Street/ Church Hill in Caterham on the Hill.

=== The combined manors of Caterham, Porkele, Upwode, Gatiers and Halyngbury ===
Porkele had been formerly included in the manor given to Waltham Abbey; together the latter manors comprised 1,000 acres (400 hectares). Humphrey Stafford, 1st Duke of Buckingham (1402–1460) held these manors leaving them in 1458 to his third son John Stafford, 1st Earl of Wiltshire when his son died without issue in 1499, under the terms of grant the elder branch, the following Duke of Buckingham inherited. His heirs sold them on the dissolution to Lord Berners who died in debt in 1533 resulting in bona vacantia and seizure by the Crown. In 1570 Thomas Sackville, 1st Earl of Dorset (as Lord Buckhurst), later Lord High Treasurer, held the 'manor of Caterham and Portele farm,' which he conveyed in that year to Henry Shelley; Sir Thomas's Sondes's widow leased the lands in 1599 to her half-brother, Main Plot seditionist Henry Brooke, 11th Baron Cobham. Then in 1615 her daughter Frances Leveson gave the rest of that lease, due the tenant's attainder to Sir Edward Barrett and Walter Barrett while the reversion was held by Sir Richard Sondes. George Ede purchased this massive estate in 1612 and it passed to Jasper Ockley in 1616. Sir Isaac Shard who was one of two Sheriffs of the City of London in 1730 who conveyed it to Thomas Clark and then passed as with the other manors; in 1911 W. L. Williams its owner lived at Portley in what remained of the estate. De Stafford School in Caterham on the Hill occupies a small part of the estate and is named after the earlier known owner. Adjoining Sunnydown School, state-run, is at what was Portley House and is for secondary education for boys with a Statement of Special Educational Needs.

=== The Manor of Salmons ===
The only manor did not have as high-profile owners. In 1339 John de Horne released some land in Caterham (and more in Warlingham) to Roger Salaman, who at his death in 1343 was "seised of a tenement". A manor of Salmons appears in 1605 by William Jordan, who soon afterwards acquired the second manor of Caterham (see above) with which Salmons afterwards descended. It was bought out of Chancery, into which it went on the death of Charles Day, by George Drew, who sold to members of the Horne family, who owned the relatively small estate in 1911.

=== Post Reformation ===
In 1544, the King granted the main rectorial manor was granted (in fee) to William Sackville JP In 1553 William Sackville and Eleanor passed the manor to Robert Hartopp, goldsmith of London, dying two years later succeeded by Elias his son, who was left it to his nephew John, whose widow Joan sold the manor in 1609 to George Evelyn who gave it to his son Sir John Evelyn on his marriage to Elizabeth Cocks. Later owners of the manor were Sir John's purchaser James Linch, his issue including Susan Hussey and her son James who sold the manor in 1699 to George Roffey. His nephew inherited it of the same name and in 1770 his sons sold the title alone and perhaps house to Matthew Robinson. Richard Hewetson bought it in 1780 passing it to his nephew Henry Hewetson holding until the Regency period. Henry's nephew William Hewetson ceased to lay claim to any manorial rights however in any event the lands had been separately sold to Henry Rowed, whose son Henry settled the estate on his wife Susan Glover in 1765. Their daughter Katherine Glover inherited these lands.

A second manor Manning and Bray report on was the main tenant's under the monastery and was held by for example buyers: William Jordan in 1607; Sir Isaac Shard (see above), who held his first court in 1726; after 1825 Charles Day of the firm of Day & Martin held but leaving no clear heirs this estate ended up in the hands of the chancery. Taxing (costs) judge George Henry Drew held the main lands and title followed by W. L. Williams in 1911.

=== Post Industrial Revolution ===
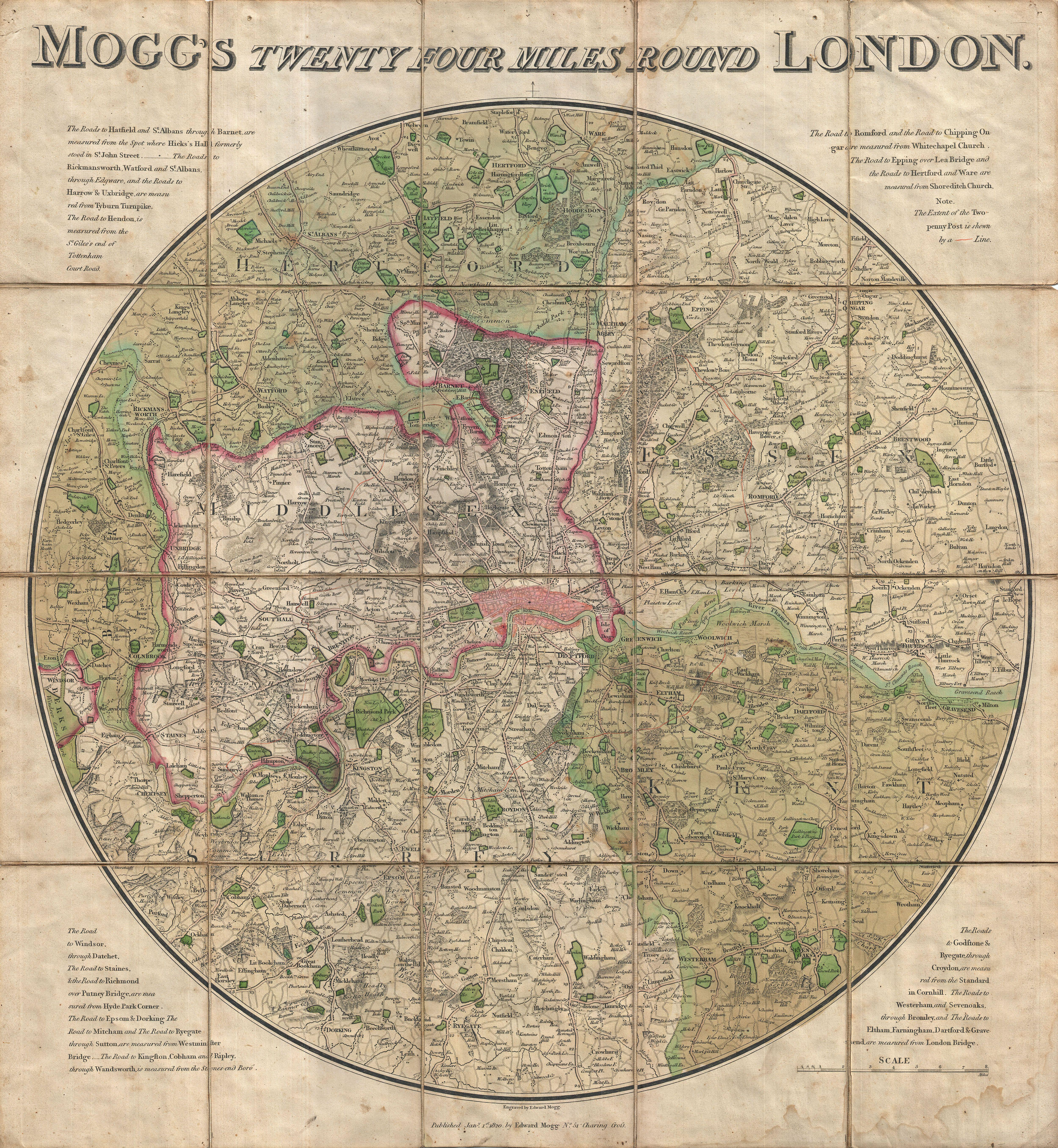
Extract from Mogg's Twenty Four Miles Round London, 1820 showing the turnpike road through Caterham

Under Rev. James Legrew in the early 19th century the church tithes were commuted for £400, retaining a glebe of 5 acres (2.0 ha).

In 1840 Caterham contained a total of 477 residents (figures taken from that census, compiled in an 1848 topographical encyclopedia) and in 1848 468 acres (189 ha) of its 2,386 acres (966 ha) were common land. Similar to today, 175 acres (71 ha) mostly steeper acres were woodland.

The more modern locality of Caterham Valley in a wide dry valley opening to the north (to Warlingham) and along its slopes is a product of the Victorian age and the coming of the Caterham railway line in 1856, which is still a terminus.

Victorian expansion of the town required the building of a much larger parish church, leading to the Church of St Mary the Virgin's building in 1866, directly across the road from St Lawrence's. As it also grew Caterham Valley gained its own Anglican church, to St. John the Evangelist, which was consecrated in 1882.

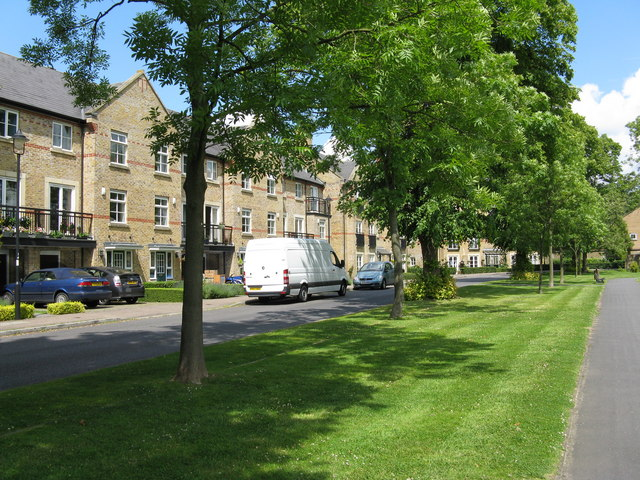
Apartment conversion of the 19th century Caterham Barracks.

From 1877 Caterham Barracks on the hill was a depot for the Foot Guards regiments. The barracks were closed in 1995 and the site was redeveloped for housing.

Two main streets (there is only one road called High Street – Caterham on the Hill) therefore serve two very close yet substantial and affluent communities (see demographics), one with the railway station and more modern buildings, one with more historic buildings as soon as the closest hill (to the northwest) is climbed from the heart of Caterham Valley. This set-up means that localism is present in that the Godstone Road during the middle of the 20th century bypassed Caterham Valley staying high and using Tillingdown, along the east of Caterham Valley from St John's School to the Croydon Road roundabout, thereby removing A22 traffic, while businesses set up and thrived in the valley itself.

On 6 July 1974 PC John Schofield was shot and killed while on patrol in Caterham.

In 1975 an IRA bomb exploded in the Caterham Arms public house injuring 10 off-duty soldiers and 23 civilians. The pub was popular with the Welsh Guards, who had recently returned to Caterham Barracks after serving in Northern Ireland. The men responsible for the bombing were later jailed for a string of murders and bombings; they were released in April 1999 following the Good Friday Agreement.

== Local government ==
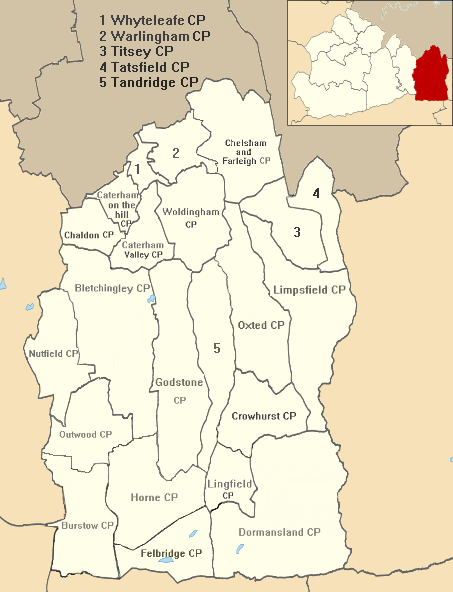
Civil Parishes in Tandridge District

There are three tiers of local government in Caterham, at parish, district, and county level. The town is split between two civil parishes: Caterham on the Hill covering the older hilltop village, and Caterham Valley covering the newer town which grew up around Caterham railway station at the foot of the hill. Both parishes are within Tandridge District, which is based in Oxted, whilst county-level services are provided by Surrey County Council, based in Reigate.

Surrey County Council has two councillors from Caterham.

Election	Member	Ward
2021	Jeremy Webster	Caterham Hill
2021	Jeffrey Gray	Caterham Valley

Caterham has ten representatives on Tandridge District Council:

Election	Member	Ward
2024	Robin Spencer	Harestone
2022	Annette Evans	Harestone
2024	Ben Horne	Portley & Queens Park
2024	Richard Mark	Portley & Queens Park
2004	Michael Cooper	Portley & Queens Park
2016	Alun Jones	Valley
2021	Jenny Gaffney	Valley
2024	James Rujbally	Westway
2024	Ankita Sharma	Westway
2024	Sarah Sowambur	Westway

Caterham has two civil parish councils: Caterham on the Hill and Caterham Valley. Caterham Valley parish has two wards, Harestone and Caterham Valley, each electing three elected parish councillors. The parish council clerk is Maureen Gibbins. Caterham on the Hill has three wards, Portley, Queen's Park and Westway, electing two, three and four parish councillors respectively. The parish council clerk is Helen Broughton.

=== Administrative history ===
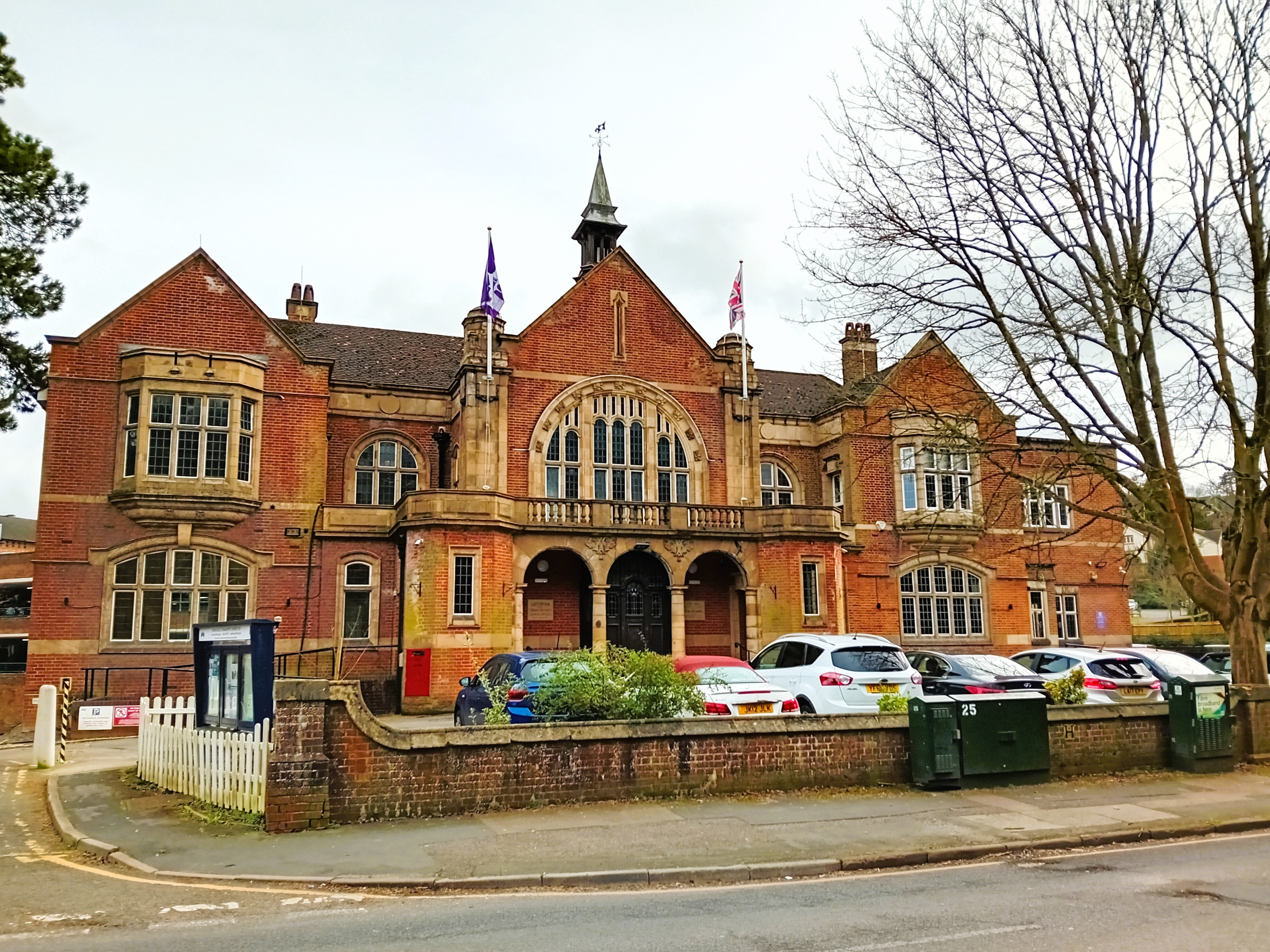
Soper Hall: Council offices and public hall built in 1911 for Caterham Urban District Council.

The ancient parish of Caterham was part of the Tandridge Hundred. The parish was included in the Godstone Poor Law Union in 1835. When parish and district councils were established in 1894 under the Local Government Act 1894, Caterham was given a parish council, which was subordinate to the Godstone Rural District Council. Less than five years later, the parish of Caterham was removed from Godstone Rural District, becoming its own urban district on 1 April 1899, with the Caterham Parish Council being replaced with Caterham Urban District Council. Caterham Urban District Council held its first meeting on 17 April 1899 at the Masonic Hall, when William Garland Soper was appointed the first chairman of the council, having previously been chairman of the short-lived parish council.

In 1911 Caterham Urban District Council built itself a public hall and office building called Soper Hall, at 3 Harestone Valley Road, to serve as its headquarters. The building was named after William Garland Soper, the first chairman of the council, who had died in 1908. Of the building's £4,000 cost, £1,500 was donated by public subscription in memory of Soper. The building was formally opened in January 1912.

In 1929 the Caterham Urban District was enlarged by the addition of the neighbouring parish of Warlingham, and the district's name was changed to Caterham and Warlingham Urban District. In 1933 the parishes of Chaldon and Woldingham were also added to the urban district. Caterham, Chaldon, Warlingham and Woldingham remained separate civil parishes, but as urban parishes they no longer had separate parish councils, with Caterham and Warlingham Urban District Council being the smallest representative body covering the whole urban district. Caterham and Warlingham Urban District Council continued to be based at Soper Hall, and also acquired a large house next door at 1 Harestone Hill to serve as additional office space. In 1951 the parish had a population of 19,844. On 1 April 1974 the parish was abolished.

Caterham and Warlingham Urban District was abolished under the Local Government Act 1972, with the area merging with neighbouring Godstone Rural District to become Tandridge District on 1 April 1974. For its first few years Tandridge District Council used the offices of both its predecessor districts in Caterham and Oxted, until 1989 when it moved to new offices in Oxted on the site of the old Godstone Rural District Council's buildings. The new building in Oxted was funded by the sale of most of the old Caterham and Warlingham council's properties around 1 Harestone Hill to make way for part of a retail development called Church Walk, with only Soper Hall being retained.

No successor parish was created for the former Caterham and Warlingham Urban District at the time of the 1974 reforms, and the area therefore became an unparished area, directly administered by Tandridge District Council. Civil parishes were re-established for the area in 2000, with the former urban district being split into six parishes: Caterham on the Hill, Caterham Valley, Chaldon, Warlingham, Whyteleafe, and Woldingham.

== Geography ==
Caterham is 21 miles (34 kilometres) from the county town of Guildford and 15 1/2 miles (25 kilometres) south of London.

Caterham on the Hill is located on a considerable area of upland extending north past adjoining Kenley Aerodrome to Kenley and Hartley Hill in Reedham. This elevated area carries on west until Hooley/Old Merstham and forms a very narrow, fairly steep ridge south of Caterham Valley's centre; east of the centre of Caterham Valley are marginally higher rolling pastures of the North Downs on top of a more crevassed smaller mass of upland which forms the village of Woldingham followed by a much larger area of upland stretching from Biggin Hill to Downe and Knockholt, Kent.

The M25 motorway (between junctions 6 and 7) is 80 to 90m below and less than 200m south of the North Downs path and the southern border of Caterham Valley civil parish and is linked by an uninterrupted hilltop dual carriageway to the north of Caterham and its lowest point, Croydon Road roundabout.

In the south of Caterham are the following hills:

Hill	Elevation	Rank within Surrey	Range
Gravelly Hill	236m	7th	North Downs
White Hill	233m	10th	North Downs

=== Elevation, soil and geology ===
The parish is on the Chalk downs, but they are in great part capped by clay and gravel

Elevations range from the height above in the southwest extreme at "Whitehill Tower, War Coppice Road in Caterham Valley" to 110m Above Ordnance Datum along the railway track, immediately below Croydon Road roundabout, a tripoint partly in Woldingham, Whyteleafe and Caterham.

Caterham lies within the North Downs and Caterham Valley's southern border is immediately south of the North Downs Way, part of a national trail network, which is here on top of the southern edge of the North Downs.

Soil here has the expected shallow, lime-rich soil over chalk or limestone of the escarpment with lower parts of the escarpment summit here, where the topsoil has eroded, having slightly acid, loamy and clayey soils with impeded drainage, which makes that soil particularly fertile.

The gault clay and the middle chalk that lies under the North Downs are both at their thickest around the valley that occupies the centre of Caterham Valley. While earlier cretaceous clays and greensand and sandy material, underlying, is evident where terrain has eroded, 90 million years ago the North Downs hard chalk was deposited, a white limestone comprising over 95% calcium carbonate. It contains thin beds of marl and nodules of flint, either scattered or in bands. The North Downs extending from Farnham to Dover are formed by this chalk. They now have an often white, almost vertical south-facing slope. In lower slopes flints washed up by early seas come more to the surface and appear closer to the surface.

== Landmarks ==
The North Downs Way, a National trail popular with walkers, passes very close to the town and is readily accessible from either Harestone Valley Road or Tupwood Lane, the Celtic hillfort promontory of the Downs mentioned above, The Cardinal's Cap, and Fosterdown or Pilgrims' Fort, a London Defensive Fort at the top of part of the ridge forming Godstone Hill, in Caterham Valley.

Whitehill Tower is a folly built south west of the town, alongside War Coppice Road, by local landowner Jeremiah Long in 1862.

== Localities ==
=== Caterham Valley ===
The civil parish of Caterham Valley has the more developed shopping area presenting the main town centre for the whole community and has a population of 7,581. The parish church of St. John the Evangelist was consecrated in 1882. The railway station is a terminus in the central, dry valley at the heart of this very large neighbourhood. Traffic to and from the London and Croydon to the north heading towards the M25 motorway is routed around the town on the A22 over the Caterham Bypass, opened in 1939 as one of the earliest such roads in the country. Caterham School is a large independent co-educational day and boarding school situated along the sides of the Harestone Valley. North Downs Hospital is small private establishment on the outskirts of the town run by the Ramsay Health Care UK. Part of Caterham Valley Business Community is represented by a business improvement district, which is publicly known as Caterham Valley For You. Caterham Police Station, operated by Surrey Police is located in the middle of the valley; the local St John Ambulance unit shares the building.

=== Caterham on the Hill ===
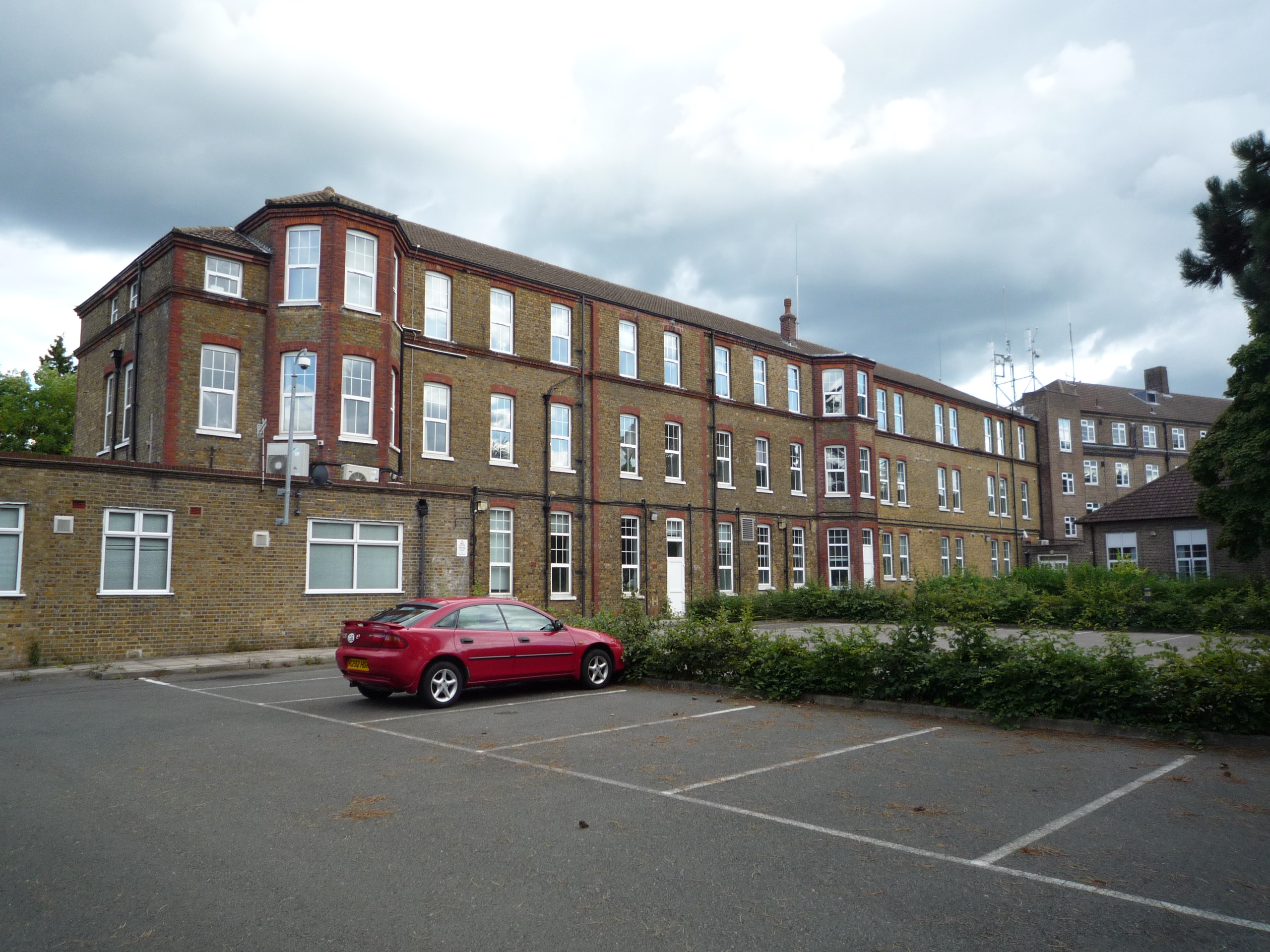
All that remains of Saint Lawrence's Hospital

Caterham on the Hill is the second of the two civil parishes. This clustered development or village is directly to the northwest of the other entire Valley part of the town and does not have steep slopes or a wide divide between upland and downland developments unlike Caterham Valley. It has a population of 11,555; it was the original development in the area so has more listed buildings compared to Caterham Valley, which has a few early Victorian outlying homes and its church listed. The only state run secondary school is in this part of the town, but it has two private primary schools.

Former barracks

The Caterham Barracks Trust run some facilities at the site of the former Caterham Barracks. The site is occupied by a supermarket, a housing estate comprising social and some private housing, and various leisure facilities including an arts centre (The Arc), and an indoor Skate park (Skaterham) housed in the former Guard's chapel.

Terry Waite and David Stirling (the founder of the SAS) trained at the barracks.

A number of films / TV series were fully or partially filmed at the barracks. They Were Not Divided filmed by Two Cities Films and Invasion: Earth series filmed by the BBC.

Mental Hospitals

Caterham Asylum, later known as Caterham Mental Hospital and later still as Saint Lawrence's Hospital, was a very large establishment for the treatment of the mentally ill. Patients came from all over London to this well known institution that by 1930 grew to over 2,000 beds. Joey Deacon lived in the hospital or its grounds for over 50 years. Most of the site has now been redeveloped as housing but a few buildings remain, although they are now empty and planning permission has been given for the buildings to be demolished and 161 homes built on the site. Joey Deacon's bungalow 'Holland House' is scheduled for demolition but the 'Blue Peter' bungalow 'Woodview' is to remain as a care home.

Hospital

Caterham on the Hill has its own small NHS hospital, Caterham Dene, run by First Community Health and Care CIC offering a range of inpatient and outpatient services, including a minor injury unit.

== Demography and housing ==
At the 2011 census, Caterham has a total population of 21,090 people among 8,543 households, an increase of 130 households in 10 years.

2011 Census Homes
Output area	Detached	Semi-detached	Terraced	Flats and apartments	Caravans/temporary/mobile homes	Shared between households
Caterham on the Hill	1,185	1,666	963	1,208	0	0
Caterham Valley	1,034	854	229	1,393	11	0

The average level of accommodation in the region composed of detached houses was 28%, the average that was apartments was 22.6%.

2011 Census Key Statistics
Output area	Population	Households	% Owned outright	% Owned with a loan	hectares
Caterham on the Hill	12,742	5,022	31.2%	44.7%	353
Caterham Valley	8,348	3,521	33.6%	40.2%	588

The proportion of households in the civil parish who owned their home outright compares to the regional average of 35.1%. The proportion who owned their home with a loan compares to the regional average of 32.5%. The remaining % is made up of rented dwellings (plus a negligible % of households living rent-free).

== Commerce ==
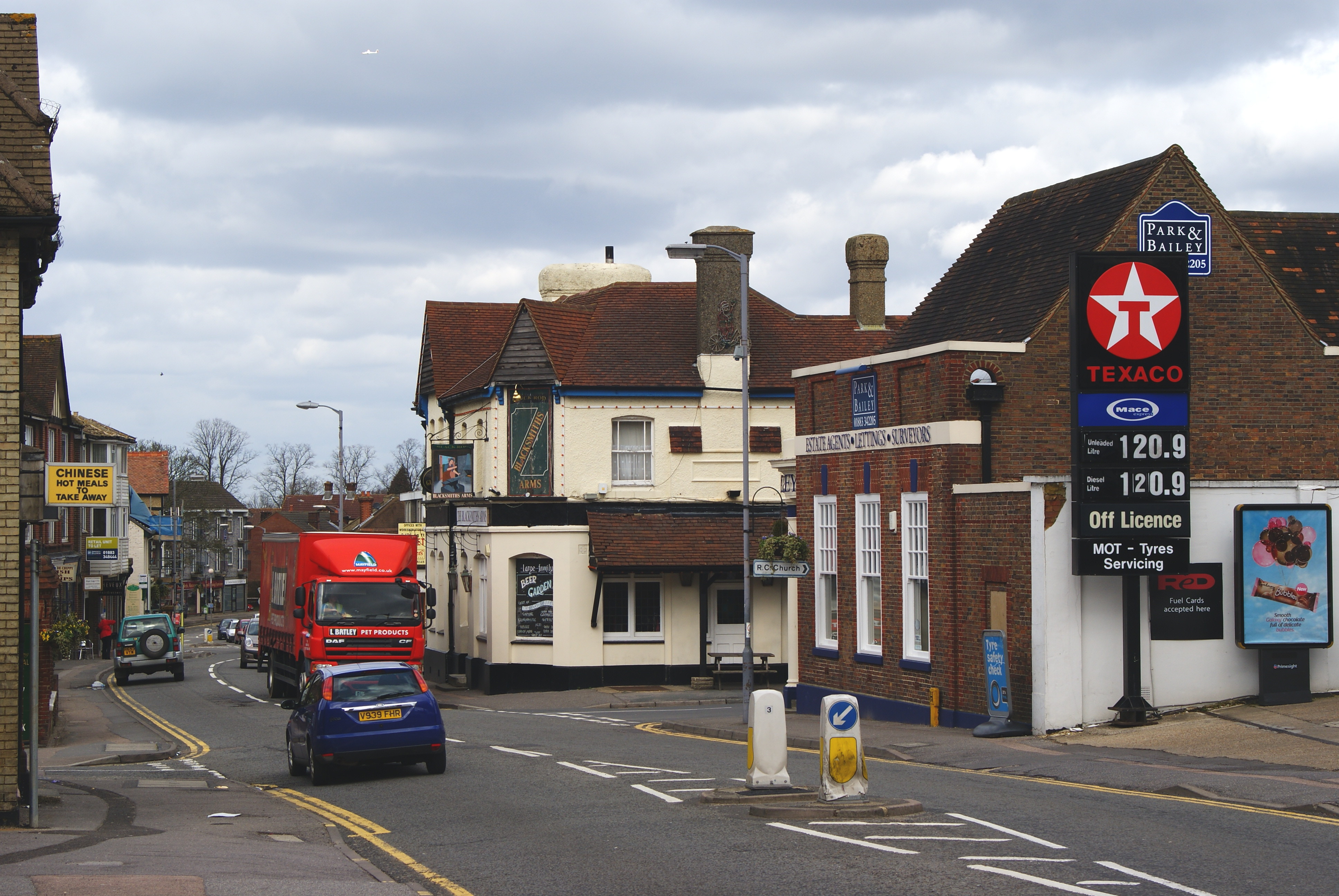
Caterham-on-the-Hill's high street

=== Church Walk ===
Church Walk Shopping Centre is a small shopping mall situated opposite Caterham railway station in Caterham Valley. Church Walk was built on the site of the Valley Hotel, which was demolished in 1988. Long before the Valley Hotel was built (to cater for visitors arriving on the new railway trains) there used to be a tennis court, croquet lawn, rose garden, fountain, and Mr. Woollet's nursery.

=== Local companies ===
Until 1987 the offices, factory and showroom Caterham Cars, makers of the Caterham 7 sports car were located in Caterham when the company moved to a new factory in Kent but retained a Caterham South showroom – but leaving the town by moving to Crawley in February 2013. The former show room that they occupied has now been turned into more homes for retired people.

The house building company, Croudace, have their head office in Caterham. Caterham and DeStafford Schools and several supermarket chains are also large local employers. The Town had a large vacant building – The Rose and Young building – which has now been demolished after over twenty years. This site has since been developed into a Lidl supermarket and flats.

The High Street, on The Hill, has a variety of small, independent shops. Parking is free for three hours in the main car park, at the top end of town.

== Transport ==
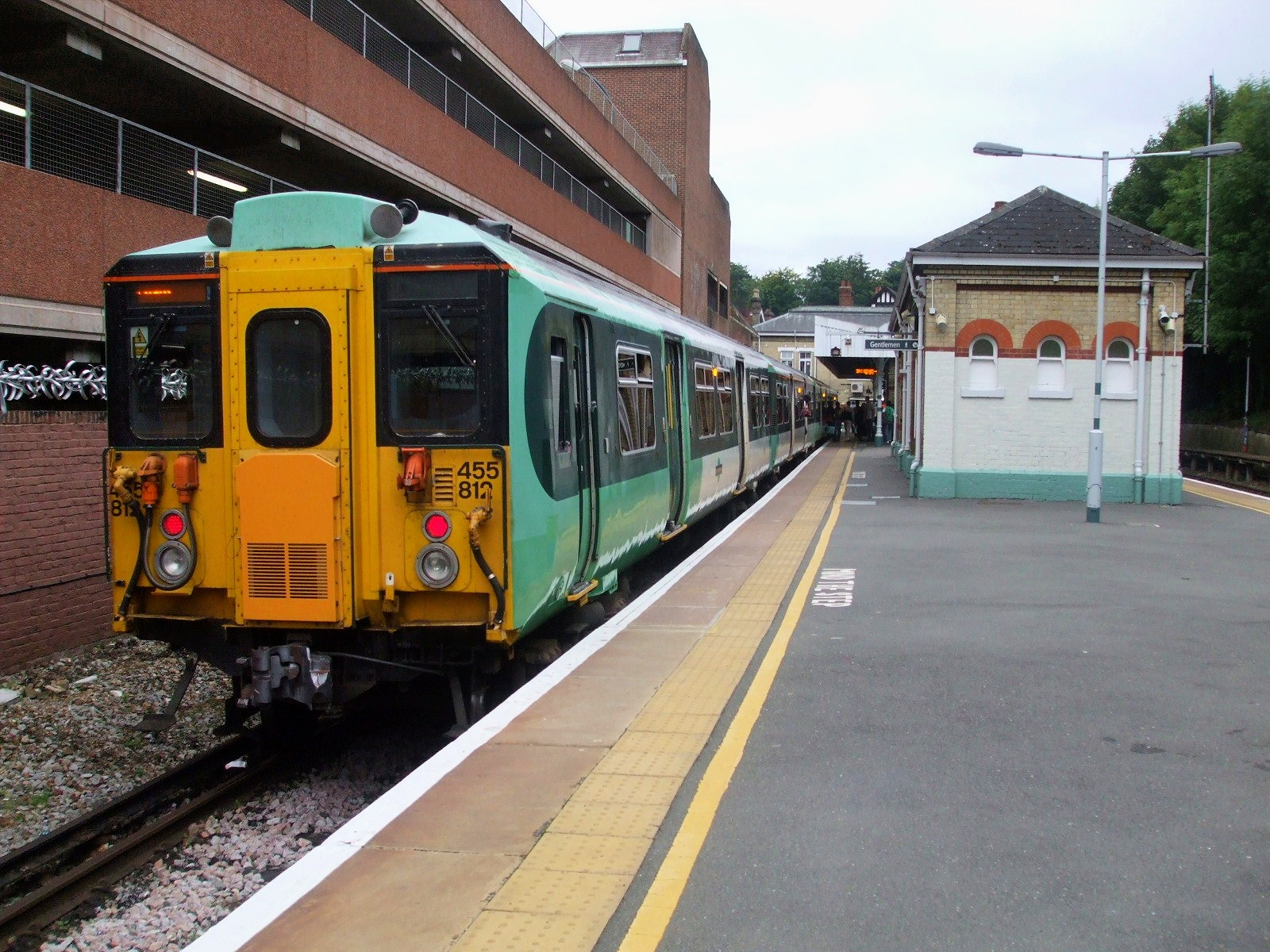
Class 455 at Caterham railway station

Caterham railway station is the terminus of the 1856-built Caterham line from Purley. Trains operate to London Bridge only.

Eight bus routes operate through Caterham, with half being operated by Metrobus. They run buses from Caterham to places such as East Grinstead, Croydon, Redhill and Oxted. Of the remaining five routes, buses are run by: London General to Coulsdon, Transport UK London Bus to Coulsdon and Sutton; Arriva London to Addington Village; and Metrobus to East Grinstead.

== Sport ==
Caterham has a youth football club. Caterham Pumas FC. The Old Caterhamians Rugby Football Club, was established in 1928. Caterham Cricket Club previously played in Queen's Park and now share facilities with the rugby club. Caterham Sea Cadets, formed in 1942, also participate in a number of watersports activities.

Caterham Pumas Football Club play their matches at Joliffe Playing Field. They have youth football teams for children under six to those under eighteen, and two adult teams.

== Media ==
Television signals are received from the Crystal Palace TV transmitter and the local relay transmitter which broadcast BBC London and ITV London programmes.

The town is served by both BBC Radio Surrey and BBC Radio London. Other radio stations including Heart South, Greatest Hits Radio Surrey & North-East Hampshire and Ridge Radio, a community based station that broadcast from the town.

Local newspapers are The Caterham Independent and Caterham Mirror.

== Education ==
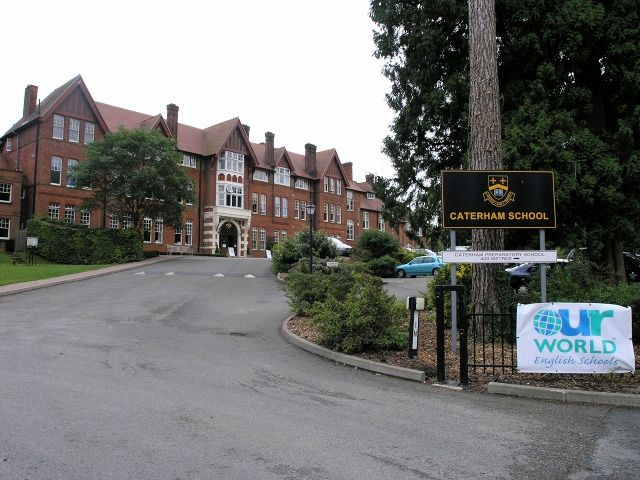
Caterham School

Caterham has a mixture of state and private schools. Three private schools in Caterham are Caterham School established at its present site since 1884, which is in the outskirts of the town, Oakhyrst Grange School and Essendene Lodge School. The main state secondary school is de Stafford School. A secondary school for boys with special educational needs called Sunnydown School is also in Caterham on the Hill.

== Culture and community ==
A children's ball pit and gymnastics centre are situated in the old Caterham Barracks housing estate. The building is made out of the two converted gymnasiums. There is a skatepark called "Skaterham" in Caterham on The Hill. It has indoor and outdoor sections, built on the grounds of the former Guards Chapel.

Based in the town centre the Miller Centre is a theatre and community centre that puts on regular non-professional shows, films and is host to a number of clubs and community groups. Croydon Gymnastics Club are based in the gymnastics centre on the high street, which also has a dance studio.

The small East Surrey Museum houses a local history collection.

An annual carnival is held in the town, with a procession of floats and a fete.

Caterham has an online radio station for the community, called Ridge Radio.

The first Caterham Festival was in 2009 and by 2014 there were 135 events spread over 5 weeks. There is a 2-day music fest, the High Street is closed for a town street party and the main road through the Valley is closed for a food fest. Other events include Shakespeare plays, an archaeological dig, open Caterham – where buildings and groups open their doors for the weekend, concerts and comedy nights. The annual Carnival takes place during the Festival.

The committee members have also advised many other towns about holding similar Festivals.

== Religion ==
Caterham has churches representing a variety of Christian denominations. The oldest church remaining in use is the church of St. Lawrence, which was established around 1095. The church has been used by several different denominations, including Quakers and Romanian Orthodox. It was largely replaced from 1866 onwards, following the consecration of the church of St. Mary the Virgin. Both of these churches are located in Caterham on the Hill.

As the town in the valley expanded after the railway was built, several churches were founded. Caterham United Reformed Church was built by nonconformists in 1875, followed by the Church of St. John the Evangelist in 1882.

== Notable people ==
The composer Mátyás Seiber lived at 169 Stafford Road from 1935 until his death in 1960. Television presenter Angus Deayton grew up in Caterham; he attended both Oakhyrst Grange and Caterham Schools. Notable sportspeople born in the town include the footballers Nicky Forster and David Price and cricketer Dar Lyon. Actors Bill Nighy and Jon Finch were also born in Caterham; Michael Robbins, another actor, died there. BTCC racer Mikey Doble was born in Caterham. Sir Bernard Ingham, Margaret Thatcher's prime ministerial press secretary, lived his last years and died in Caterham.

== See also ==
- London Defence Positions
- Sacred Heart Church, Caterham
