= MasterChef Australia series 18 =

MasterChef Australia
- Season 18
- Judges: Andy Allen; Sofia Levin; Jean-Christophe Novelli; Poh Ling Yeow
- No. of contestants: 24
- Winner: Vinnie Gibaldi
- Runner-up: Petro Papathomas
- No. of episodes: 60

Release
- Original network: Network 10
- Original release: 19 April – 9 August 2026

Series chronology
- ← Previous; Series 17 Next → Series 19

The eighteenth series of the Australian television cooking show MasterChef Australia premiered on 19 April 2026. It featured the same four judges as the two previous editions: series 4 winner Andy Allen, food writer Sofia Levin, French chef Jean-Christophe Novelli and series 1 runner-up Poh Ling Yeow.

Guests included Jimmy Barnes, Maggie Beer, Andy Hearnden, Robert Irwin, Justine Schofield, Marion Grasby, Rick Stein, Curtis Stone, Adriano Zumbo, Sanjeev Kapoor and Cherish Finden. Meghan, Duchess of Sussex also appeared as a guest judge.

== Changes ==
In contrast to the previous series, the show returned to featuring a cast of 24 new contestants. In addition, for the first time since series thirteen an auditions stage was broadcast, with the auditions previously either having been omitted from broadcast or not held. Over the first three episodes, 40 contestants competed in the auditions stage for a top 24 position. In each of the first two episodes, 10 contestants were chosen from 20 competitors and in the third episode, the final 4 contestants were chosen from the 20 remaining competitors from the first two episodes of audition rounds.

== Contestants ==
=== Top 24 ===
Contestant	Age	State	Occupation	Status
Vinnie Gibaldi	26	VIC	Registered nurse	Winner 9 August
Petro Papathomas	30	VIC	Chartered accountant	Runner-up 9 August
Aaron Kher	32	VIC	Medical product specialist	Third place 3 August
Casper Kenworthy	28	ACT	Technology consultant	Eliminated 27 July
Annabel Lloyd	31	NSW	Registered nurse	Eliminated 22 July
Luke Harris	20	WA	Student	Eliminated 20 July
Pat McGarry	37	NSW	Council worker	Eliminated 15 July
Alyona Iljuhhina	39	NSW	Clinical research manager	Eliminated 8 July
Emily Sue	37	NSW	Youth worker	Eliminated 6 July
Hannah Johnson	37	WA	Homemaker	Eliminated 1 July
Grace West-King	23	VIC	Retail assistant	Eliminated 24 June
Bella Di Conza	21	VIC	Agriculture student	Eliminated 22 June; Returned 9 June; Eliminated 6 May
Jackie Yu	31	NSW	Tech recruiter	Eliminated 15 June
Dot McHugh	31	NSW	Senior graphic designer	Eliminated 10 June
Jack Hosking	29	SA	Events manager	Eliminated 8 June
Lydia Kamperos	58	NSW	Homemaker	Eliminated 3 June
Olaolu Olorunnimbe	34	NSW	Brand consultant	Eliminated 1 June
Miin Wei Looi	52	VIC	Communications strategist	Eliminated 25 May
Lucy Mansfield	24	QLD	Web designer	Eliminated 20 May
Kanika Gadyok	35	NSW	IT analyst	Eliminated 18 May
Alita Harvey-Rodriguez	40	VIC	Chief operating officer	Eliminated 11 May
Belinda Gosden	56	WA	Education administrator	Eliminated 4 May
Jeff Lam	47	VIC	Print production technician	Eliminated 29 April
Megs Steel	40	QLD	HR consultant	Eliminated 27 April

== Guests ==
Week	Guest	Challenge
2	Jimmy Barnes & Jane Barnes	Mystery box challenge
2	Maggie Beer	Pressure test
3 (Family Favorites Week)	Andy Hearnden	Immunity breakfast challenge
4 (Viral Wonders Week)	Catherine Zhang	Mystery box challenge
4 (Viral Wonders Week)	Victoria Minell	Viral ingredients challenge
4 (Viral Wonders Week)	Lily Huynh	Service challenge
4 (Viral Wonders Week)	Khanh Ong	Sandwich immunity pin challenge
5 (Global Week)	Rick Stein	Mystery box challenge
5 (Global Week)	Rosheen Kaul	Pressure test
6 (Nostalgia Week)	Vincent Yeow Lim	Mystery box challenge
6 (Nostalgia Week)	Justine Schofield	Immunity pin challenge
7 (Perfect Pairs Week)	Matt Sinclair & Daniel Dobra	Mystery box challenge
8 (Aussie Classics Week)	Curtis Stone	Mystery box challenge
8 (Aussie Classics Week)	Curtis Stone	Elimination challenge
8 (Aussie Classics Week)	Robert Irwin	Elimination challenge
9 (Sweet Week)	Adriano Zumbo	Mystery box challenge
9 (Sweet Week)	Jess Liemantara	Immunity pin challenge
10 (Masters Week)	Josh Niland	Mystery box challenge
10 (Masters Week)	Curtis Stone	Elimination challenge
10 (Masters Week)	Tom Sarafian	Invention test
10 (Masters Week)	Kirsten Tibballs	Pressure test
11 (Knockout Week)	Sarah Todd & Declan Cleary	Mystery box challenge
12	Sanjeev Kapoor	Mystery box challenge
12	Sam Aisbett	Pressure test
13 (Heat Week)	Marion Grasby	Mystery box challenge
15 (Finals Week)	Meghan, Duchess of Sussex	Immunity challenge
17 (Grand Finale)	Cherish Finden	Pressure test

== Elimination chart ==
No.	Week	1	2		3		4			5		6			7		8		9		10		11			12		13			14		Finals	Semi-Final	Grand Finale
No.	Mystery Box Challenge Winner	None	Casper		None		Grace			Alyona; Casper; Grace; Miin		Aaron; Dot			Annabel; Pat		Hannah; Pat		Alyona; Pat; Petro		Annabel; Casper; Petro		Pat; Petro			Casper		Casper			Vinnie		None	None	Vinnie
No.	Invention Test Winner	None	Aaron; Dot; Petro		None		None			Alyona; Casper; Dot		None			Dot; Pat		None		Alyona; Bella; Hannah; Pat		Petro		Petro			None		Petro			None		None	None	None
No.	Immunity Challenge	None	None		Aaron; Alita; Dot; Kanika		Aaron; Alyona; Annabel; Hannah; Jackie; Lydia; Miin			None		Aaron; Dot		Vinnie (Immunity Pin)	Annabel; Pat		Hannah; Pat		Alyona; Pat; Petro		Annabel; Casper; Petro		Aaron; Annabel; Vinnie			Aaron; Pat; Petro; Vinnie		Annabel; Casper; Petro			Vinnie	Vinnie	Petro	None	None
1	Vinnie	Top 24	Btm 21	Btm 3	Btm 3	IN	Btm 2	Team Lose		Btm 11	Btm 2	Btm 15	Team Win	I.P.	DNP	Btm 5/Imm.	Btm 12	Top 3	Btm 10	IN	Top 2	IN	IN	IN	IMM	Btm 3	IMM	IN	IN	Btm 4	IMM	IMM	Btm 2	Top 2	WINNER
2	Petro	Top 24	Btm 21	Top 3	Top 3	IN	Btm 18	Team Lose		Btm 11	IN	Btm 15	Team Lose		Btm 9	IN	Btm 12	Btm 13	IMM	IN	IMM	WIN	Top 2	WIN	Top 2	Btm 8	IMM	Top 3	IN	IMM	Btm 5	Btm 4	IMM	Top 2	Runner-up
3	Aaron	Top 24	Btm 21	Top 3	IMM	Top 6	Btm 18	Team Win 1		Btm 11	IN	IMM	Team Lose		Top 4	IN	Btm 12	Top 3	Btm 4	IN	Btm 7	Btm 2	IN	IN	IMM	Btm 8	IMM	IN	Top 2	Btm 4	Btm 2	Btm 4	Btm 3	3rd	Eliminated (Ep 59)
4	Casper	Top 24	IMM	IN	Btm 15	IN	Btm 18	Team Lose		IMM	Top 3	Btm 15	Team Win		Top 4	IN	Btm 12	Btm 13	Btm 2	IN	IMM	IN	Btm 2			IMM	Btm 2	IMM			Btm 3	Btm 2	Elim	Eliminated (Ep 57)	
5	Annabel	Top 24	Btm 21	IN	Top 3	IN	Btm 18	Team Win 2		Top 4	IN	Btm 15	Team Lose		IMM	Btm 2	Btm 12	Top 3	Btm 4	IN	IMM	IN	IN	IN	IMM	Btm 3	Btm 4	IN	IMM		Btm 5	Elim	Eliminated (Ep 55)		
6	Luke	Top 24	Btm 21	Btm 5	Btm 15	IN	Btm 18	Team Lose		Btm 11	IN	Btm 4	Team Lose		Btm 2	IN	Btm 12	Btm 13	Btm 10	IN	Btm 7	Btm 4	IN	Btm 7		Btm 8	Btm 4	Top 3	IN	Btm 2	Elim	Eliminated (Ep 53)			
7	Pat	Top 24	Btm 21	Btm 5	Btm 15	Btm 6	Btm 18	Team Lose		Top 4	IN	Btm 15	Team Lose		IMM	Top 2	IMM	Btm 13	IMM	WIN	Top 2	IN	Top 2	IN	Btm 7	WIN	IMM	IN	IN	Elim	Eliminated (Ep 51)				
8	Alyona	Top 24	Btm 21	IN	Btm 15	Btm 6	IMM			IMM	Top 3	Btm 15	Team Lose		Btm 9	Btm 4	Btm 2	Btm 13	IMM	Top 4	Btm 2	IN	IN	IN	Top 2	Top 2	Elim	Eliminated (Ep 47)							
9	Emily	Top 24	Top 2	IN	Btm 15	Top 6	Btm 18	Team Lose		Top 4	IN	Btm 15	Team Lose		Btm 9	IN	Btm 12	Btm 13	Btm 10	IN	Btm 7	Btm 4	Btm 7			Elim	Eliminated (Ep 45)								
10	Hannah	Top 24	Btm 21	IN	Btm 15	Btm 2	Btm 18	Team Win 1		Btm 11	IN	Btm 15	Team Win		Top 4	Btm 4	IMM	Btm 13	Btm 10	Top 4	Btm 7	IN	IN	Elim		Eliminated (Ep 43)									
11	Grace	Top 24	Btm 21	IN	Btm 15	IN	IMM	Team Lose		IMM	IN	Btm 4	Team Lose		Btm 9	IN	Btm 12	Btm 13	Btm 10	IN	Btm 7	Elim	Eliminated (Ep 39)												
12	Bella	Top 24	Top 2	IN	Btm 15	Elim	Eliminated (Ep 11)											IMM	Btm 10	Top 4	Elim	Re-Eliminated (Ep 37)													
13	Jackie	Top 24	Btm 2	Btm 3	Btm 15	IN	Btm 18	Team Win 2	I.P.	Btm 3	Btm 4/Imm.	Btm 15	Team Lose		Btm 9	IN	Btm 12	Btm 13	Elim	Eliminated (Ep 33)															
14	Dot	Top 24	Btm 21	Top 3	IMM	Top 6	Btm 18	Team Lose		Btm 11	Top 3	IMM	Team Lose		Btm 9	Top 2	Btm 12	Elim	Eliminated (Ep 31)																
15	Jack	Top 24	Btm 21	IN	Btm 15	IN	Btm 18	Team Lose		Btm 11	IN	Btm 4	Team Win		Btm 9	IN	Elim	Eliminated (Ep 29)																	
16	Lydia	Top 24	Btm 21	IN	Btm 15	Btm 6	Btm 18	Team Win 1		Top 4	IN	Btm 15	Team Lose		Top 4	Elim	Eliminated (Ep 27)																		
17	Olaolu	Top 24	Btm 21	IN	Btm 3	Btm 6	Btm 18	Team Lose		Btm 3	IN	WIN	Team Lose		Elim	Eliminated (Ep 25)																			
18	Miin	Top 24	Btm 21	IN	Btm 15	Top 6	Btm 18	Team Win 2		IMM	Btm 4	Elim	Eliminated (Ep 21)																						
19	Lucy	Top 24	Btm 21	IN	Top 3	Top 6	Btm 18	Team Lose		Btm 11	Elim	Eliminated (Ep 19)																							
20	Kanika	Top 24	Btm 21	IN	IMM	IN	Btm 18	Team Lose		Elim	Eliminated (Ep 17)																								
21	Alita	Top 24	Btm 21	IN	IMM	Top 6	Elim	Eliminated (Ep 13)																											
22	Belinda	Top 24	Btm 21	IN	Elim	Eliminated (Ep 9)																													
23	Jeff	Top 24	Btm 21	Elim	Eliminated (Ep 7)																														
24	Megs	Top 24	Elim	Eliminated (Ep 5)																															
	Eliminated	None	Megs	Jeff	Belinda	Bella; 1st elimination	Alita			Kanika	Lucy	Miin			Olaolu	Lydia	Jack	Dot	Jackie		Bella; 2nd elimination	Grace	Hannah			Emily	Alyona	Pat			Luke	Annabel	Casper	Aaron	Petro
	Eliminated	None	Megs	Jeff	Belinda	Bella; 1st elimination	Alita			Kanika	Lucy	Miin			Olaolu	Lydia	Jack	Dot	Jackie		Bella; 2nd elimination	Grace	Hannah			Emily	Alyona	Pat			Luke	Annabel	Casper	Aaron	Vinnie

== Episodes and ratings ==
Ep#/Wk-Ep#	Original airdate	Episode title / event	Viewers (national reach & total)	Nightly ranking
Week 1 (Auditions Week)
1/01-1	Sunday, 19 April 2026	Series Premiere: Auditions Part 1 — Forty hopefuls were welcomed to the competition, where they were split into two groups of 20. The first group of 20 contestants competed for a Top 24 spot. To earn it, the judges asked them to cook their dream dish in 90 minutes, with 10 cooks earning a white apron and advancing to the Top 24. Four contestants impressed the judges and were awarded an apron during the tasting session. They were Lydia's octopus, Olaolu's Ofada stew, Jackie's black sesame and yuzu cake, and Jeff's dumplings. After the tasting, the other six aprons were given to Alita, Jack, Annabel, Casper, Megs, and Aaron. The 10 contestants who failed to receive a white apron will be given a second chance to earn an apron in episode 3.	1,301,000 / 722,000	#8
2/01-2	Monday, 20 April 2026	Auditions Part 2 — The second group of 20 contestants competed for 10 white aprons. The challenge was the same: cook their dream dish in 90 minutes. During the tasting, three contestants impressed the judges and were awarded an apron. They were Pat's 'bread & fat' lamb dish, Emily's herbal wonton noodle soup, and Vinnie's porchetta sandwich. After the tasting, seven aprons were awarded to Hannah, Kanika, Alyona, Miin, Bella, Belinda, and Dot. The remaining 10, who failed to earn a white apron, will be given a second chance in episode 3.	1,115,000 / 660,000	#12
3/01-3	Tuesday, 21 April 2026	Auditions Part 3 — The 20 contestants who failed to earn a white apron in the initial rounds were given a second chance to compete for the last four aprons. The challenge was to cook a showstopping dish in 90 minutes. On the back of the tasting, the final four aprons were awarded to Luke (whose risk-taking on cooking a bombe Alaska paid off), Lucy (with her Earl Grey choux au craquelin), Grace (with her fig leaf sponge cake), and Petro (with his prawn bisque fettuccine).	1,093,000 / 659,000	#11
Week 2
4/02-1	Sunday, 26 April 2026	Top 24 Mystery Box Challenge — The first challenge for the Top 24 was a mystery box set by Australian rock singer Jimmy Barnes and his wife Jane. They had to cook with the ingredients inside the box in 75 minutes. The judges would only taste the 10 dishes that had the most appealing presentation. Halfway through the cook, Barnes added a twist. The cooks who incorporated whiskey marmalade into their dish would receive an additional 15 minutes to complete the challenge. All but Grace decided to take on the marmalade twist. After the cook, the top 10 dishes were cooked by Casper, Dot, Alyona, Jack, Luke, Pat, Hannah, Miin, Alita, and Annabel. All 10 of them shone during the tasting, with Casper and Alyona's respective spatchcock dish (despite the latter changing the protein from rainbow trout to take advantage of the twist) and Annabel's cured rainbow trout dish being singled out as the top 3 performers. In a close decision, Casper's dish was the one that the judges chose as the challenge winner, winning him immunity from the first elimination challenge of the series.	1,158,000 / 640,000	#9
5/02-2	Monday, 27 April 2026	First Elimination Challenge — For the first elimination challenge of the series, all but Casper (who had immunity) had 75 minutes to cook a dish that gives the judges a look into their own lives. During the tasting, Emily impressed the judges with her tomato and short rib noodle soup, to the point where Jean-Christophe took off her black apron, earning her safety. Another dish that impressed the judges and earned its maker safety was Bella's hazelnut, coffee, and fennel mille-feuille. The bottom 2 performers were Jackie and Megs. Jackie failed to plate her duck in time on her scallion pancake dish, but this error was outweighed when Megs served undercooked and inedible prawns, making her the first contestant to be eliminated this series.	1,091,000 / 718,000	#11
6/02-3	Tuesday, 28 April 2026	Cereal Invention Test — Cereal is the main focus for the season's first invention test, and the chefs were asked to cook an inventive dish starring the ingredient in 75 minutes. After the tasting, Dot (with her corn flake trio), Aaron (with his steak tartare tartlet on corn flake shell), and Petro (with his Middle Eastern-inspired pumpkin with corn flake cumin cluster) were deemed the best performers in the challenge. However, Pat's steak tartare, and beer batter with rice bubble prawns, lacked clarity and were poorly executed, Jackie's Coco-Pops and kumquat tart was overpowered with cocoa powder, Jeff's Coco-Pops mille-feuille was a bit soggy, Luke's Korean fried chicken had poor batter distribution and lacked inventiveness and punch, and Vinnie's Nutri-Grain cannoli had textural issues. Having cooked the bottom 5 dishes, Jackie, Jeff, Luke, Pat and Vinnie were send to the pressure test.	1,158,000 / 678,000	#12
7/02-4	Wednesday, 29 April 2026	Maggie Beer's Pressure Test — After Maggie Beer presented two pies (one savory and one sweet), both made with the same sour cream pastry, Pat, Jackie, Jeff, Luke, and Vinnie had 1 hour and 45 minutes to create their own pie using Maggie's sour cream pastry recipe, with an accompanying side and sauce. After tasting, Pat's Sri Lankan chicken curry pie and Luke's beef bourguignon pie were deemed the two best. While Jackie's lo mai gai pie filling divided the judges' opinions and Vinnie's bechamel was too rich for his lasagne-style pie, the judges agreed that the time pressure got to Jeff, and combined with the undercooked pastry and overpowering spring onion flavor on his Hong Kong chicken pie, it was enough to seal his elimination.	1,114,000 / 669,000	#11
Week 3 (Family Favorites Week)
8/03-1	Sunday, 3 May 2026	Immunity Challenge: Andy Cooks — After a demonstration on how to cook an omelette, tornado egg and omurice from social media cook Andy Hearnden aka Andy Cooks, the remaining contestants had 60 minutes to create their ultimate breakfast dish. The judges would only taste 12 of the most appealing dishes with the four best dishes will win immunity from the next elimination. After the cook, the judges decided to taste the dishes made by Alita, Aaron, Emily, Casper, Jackie, Vinnie, Annabel, Bella, Jack, Hannah, Dot and Kanika. Of those, it was Alita (Peruvian cachanga flatbread dish), Aaron (fish congee), Dot (Turkish eggs), and Kanika (Uttapam dish) who cooked the Top 4 dishes, and all of them were immune from the next elimination.	1,100,009 / 642,000	#11
9/03-2	Monday, 4 May 2026	Elimination Challenge: Reinventing Carbs — After the judges gave a demonstration of different ways to prepare quick carbs, where Jean-Christophe made oven-cooked pilaf rice, Poh made rice noodles, Sofia made potato latkes, and Andy made his two-ingredient yoghurt flatbread, the contestants (except Alita, Aaron, Dot, and Kanika, who had immunity) had 36 minutes (the average time for a family to prepare a dinner on a weeknight) to use one of the four hacks to make a dish that would save them from elimination. After tasting, Annabel (barramundi with Sri Lankan sambal and rice pilaf), Lucy (crispy beef noodles), and Petro (prawn moilee paired with flatbread) were judged to have the top dishes. Meanwhile, Olaolu, Belinda, and Vinnie landed in the bottom 3. Olaolu struggled with his flatbread and, while he managed to recover and earned praise for the flatbread, the kofta, which was served with the flatbread, was dry. Vinnie's dish had good flavours, but his lamb was undercooked, and the flatbread was too doughy. Fortunately for the two, it was Belinda's mismatched concept of a smashburger on top of a flatbread, judged to be very dry and rubbery, that sent her home.	1,196,000 / 706,000	#12
10/03-3	Tuesday, 5 May 2026	First Team Challenge — The remaining 21 contestants were welcomed with a cloche on their bench, revealed to be a coloured apron. The colour determined the teams of 3 for the series' first team challenge. The task is to cook a family feast consisting of two mains, three sides, and a dessert in 75 minutes. After the tasting, the judges were impressed by 2 teams. The Turquoise team of Dot, Miin and Alita was praised for their generosity and cohesiveness, especially praising Dot's cauliflower salad. The Purple team of Aaron, Emily, and Lucy was also praised for their teamwork and how it showed in their Chinese feast. Those two teams were deemed the top performers and were safe. Unfortunately, the Pink team of Pat, Lydia, and Olaolu was plagued with unevenly cooked chicken and a lack of seasoning across the board, whilst the Navy team of Hannah, Bella, and Alyona overcomplicated their feast, and the amount of sauce overpowered the dishes. As a result, those two teams will face off in the next elimination.	1,179,000 / 708,000	#11
11/03-4	Wednesday, 6 May 2026	Elimination Challenge: Family Traditions — After the judges showed the photo of their food traditions (Andy and his family going fishing on the school holidays, Poh helping her mother make and decorate cakes, Sofia incorporating her culture into her family and food, and Jean-Christophe's food tradition with his wife and children), Pat, Lydia, Olaolu, Hannah, Bella, and Alyona were given 75 minutes to make a dish that showed the judges their family traditions. After tasting, the judges deemed Lydia's chicken avgolemono as the best dish, with the judges commenting that it made them feel like one big family. The bottom two were Bella and Hannah. While Hannah's sauce for her sticky date pudding was unpleasant, it was Bella's over-complicated entremet dish that was rushed and had overall flaws in most of her elements that caused her elimination.	1,029,000 / 695,000	#11
Week 4 (Viral Wonders Week)
12/04-1	Sunday, 10 May 2026	Mystery Box Challenge: Catherine Zhang — To kick off Viral Wonders Week, the remaining contestants were welcomed by a mystery box set by pastry chef and social media sensation Catherine Zhang, which contained a variety of Catherine's viral fruit desserts. The challenge was to create their own dessert that celebrated fruit in 75 minutes, with the judges tasting only the top 10 dishes based on the most appealing presentation, the best dish will win immunity from the next elimination. After looking at the dishes, the judges chose to taste the dishes made by Emily, Casper, Grace, Olaolu, Lucy, Vinnie, Petro, Dot, Jack and Pat. The decision on who earned immunity came down between Jack and Grace. While Jack's honey and thyme panna cotta with blood orange and Campari granita earned rave reviews, it was no match for Grace's whole lemon dessert with lemon biscotti, and she earned immunity from the next elimination.	1,022,000 / 601,000	#10
13/04-2	Monday, 11 May 2026	Elimination Challenge: Victoria Minelli's Viral Ingredients — Social media creator Victoria Minelli set the challenge for everybody (except Grace, who won immunity) to cook a dish using one of her five viral ingredients: cucumber, burrata, pistachio, rice paper, or gochujang, in 75 minutes, to keep their place in the competition. The top dish of the challenge will be fast-tracked to the immunity challenge at the end of the week. After tasting, the judges deemed Alyona's avocado and sour cream ice cream with pistachio crunch as the best, fast-tracking her to the immunity challenge. Alita and Vinnie wound up at the bottom of the pack. Vinnie struggled with the focaccia for his pork and gochujang sandwich; as a result, he was forced to use the bread from the pantry, which was criticised. But, it was Alita who made more mistakes, as her confusing dumpling lasagne dish was wet and had the wrong usage of burrata, which was enough to eliminate her.	1,157,000 / 696,000	#12
14/04-3	Tuesday, 12 May 2026	Team Service Challenge: Viral Worthy Dish — The remaining contestants (save for Alyona, who was fast-tracked to the immunity challenge) were split into 6 opposing teams of three for their first service challenge, where they had to create one viral-worthy dish for hundreds of diners. They had two hours of prep time before the diners came, and amongst the diners, there was a mystery guest. After the challenge was over, the mystery guest was revealed: food influencer and social media creator Lily Huynh. After the tasting, the Orange team (with their pork rendang tostada) and the Blue team (with their pork belly roti taco) were deemed the best, so Miin, Annabel, and Jackie (Orange) and Aaron, Hannah, and Lydia (Blue) would join Alyona to compete for immunity.	1,029,000 / 607,000	#14
15/04-4	Wednesday, 13 May 2026	Immunity Pin Challenge: Khanh Ong — Former contestant Khanh Ong returned to the kitchen to set up a challenge for Miin, Annabel, Jackie, Aaron, Hannah, Lydia, and Alyona: to create their version of an epic sandwich in 60 minutes, with an immunity pin at stake. After the tasting, although everyone rose to the challenge and produced exemplary sandwiches, the judges singled out Jackie's bulgogi Philly cheesesteak sandwich as the most memorable, and she earned the series' first immunity pin, which gave her the opportunity to skip any elimination challenge, but only after she heard the challenge and before cooking began.	1,086,000 / 668,000	#11
Week 5 (Global Week)
16/05-1	Sunday, 17 May 2026	Mystery Box Challenge: Rick Stein — Global Week began with the arrival of celebrity chef Rick Stein, who set the mystery box for the remaining contestants. They have to create an international dish from at least one ingredient of the mystery box, plus at least one of the 120 herbs and spices on display, in 75 minutes. The judges will only taste the 12 most appealing dishes from the challenge, with the 4 best performers earning immunity from the next elimination. After the challenge, the judges decided to taste the dishes made by Casper, Olaolu, Alyona, Vinnie, Pat, Emily, Annabel, Miin, Jack, Petro, Hannah, and Grace. Amongst these 12, the judges singled out Casper's mango and chili ice cream, Grace's crumbed snapper, Miin's Malaysian crab curry, and Alyona's Italian whole baked snapper as the best four dishes, and the 4 of them received immunity from the next elimination.	992,000 / 609,000	#11
17/05-2	Monday, 18 May 2026	Elimination Challenge: Cuisines from Around the World — In this elimination challenge, the contestants (except Casper, Grace, Miin, and Alyona) had 75 minutes to create a dish from either one of five cuisines: Vietnamese, Mexican, Lebanese, Japanese or Italian, with a hero ingredient (lemongrass for Vietnamese, corn for Mexican, eggplant for Lebanese, miso for Japanese and tomatoes for Italian) being revealed after they chose the cuisine. After tasting, the judges deemed Emily's jibu-ni duck and broth dish, Annabel's seared scallops with corn butter, Lydia's stuffed eggplant, and Pat's cavolo nero and ricotta tortellini with tomato water as the top-performing dishes. Unfortunately, Olaolu, Kanika, and Jackie ended up in the bottom 3. Olaolu's charred corn salsa for his Mexican beef quesadilla was overcooked and chewy. Kanika's Mexican prawn and corn dish had a missing tortilla element, her sauce was one note, and her corn elements lacked focus. Jackie, who did not play her immunity pin, put herself in danger, as her miso and pumpkin cake was too sweet, had an inconsistent miso flavor, and the construction of the cake was a little bit off. Ultimately, while the judges felt that the bottom 3 produced dishes with flaws, they felt that Kanika's dish failed to meet the brief and had the most flaws, and she was eliminated.	1,103,000 / 678,000	#12
18/05-3	Tuesday, 19 May 2026	Invention Test: Fusion — In this invention test, the remaining contestants were asked to combine two cuisines into a cohesive dish in 75 minutes that celebrated both countries they selected. After tasting, the top three performing dishes were Dot's Hungarian langos with Turkish lamb mince, Alyona's matcha choux buns, and Casper's Japanese dolmades. Unfortunately, Jackie's stuffed fish was overcooked and had an underwhelming Italian-inspired sauce, Vinnie's mango sticky rice arancini was too mushy, Miin's rasam ceviche lacked Indian flavors and was overpowered by chipotle, and Lucy's Vietnamese iced coffee crullers were rushed and poorly executed. Having cooked the four least-impressive dishes, Jackie, Lucy, Miin and Vinnie were send to the pressure test.	1,057,000 / 630,000	#11
19/05-4	Wednesday, 20 May 2026	Pressure Test: Rosheen Kaul — Rosheen Kaul presented her version of chou farci for the pressure test. Before it began, Jackie decided to play her immunity pin, saving her from possible elimination, while Lucy, Miin, and Vinnie had to replicate the dish in three hours. Miin struggled during the challenge; the chou farci was cracked, and the presentation was chaotic, but thanks to his palate and intuition, his filling thrived in the judging, and he was the first to be declared safe. Vinnie executed all the elements well, but the dish as a whole was salty and over-seasoned. Although Lucy's dish was stunning and had great presentation, both the cabbage and mousseline were undercooked, and because they were the foundations of Rosheen's dish, the judges felt that Lucy had missed the brief and she was eliminated.	1,099,000 / 671,000	#10
Week 6 (Nostalgia Week)
20/06-1	Sunday, 24 May 2026	Mystery Box Challenge: Dim Sim Lim — Nostalgia Week commenced with a mystery box challenge, set by social media presenter Vincent Yeow Lim, aka Dim Sim Lim. After he demonstrated his pork and prawn shumai, the contestants had one hour to produce a dish with a steamed element. The judges will only taste the ten most appealing dishes, with the top two cooks will win immunity from the next elimination. After the cook is over, the judges decided to sample the dishes made by Dot, Annabel, Hannah, Pat, Petro, Miin, Casper, Vinnie, Grace, and Aaron, with Aaron's snapper roulade and Dot's chicken momos were singled out as the best dishes of the challenge, earning them safety from the next elimination.	1,065,000 / 671,000	#10
21/06-2	Monday, 25 May 2026	Elimination Challenge — In this elimination challenge, the contestants (apart from Aaron and Dot) were asked to channel their nostalgia and create a dish inspired by their family tree and roots in 75 minutes. After the tasting, the judges determined that the top-performing dish was Olaolu's Efo Riro, and he received the $10.000 from Ancestry. Unfortunately, the judges also agreed that the cook overwhelmed Miin. Jack, Luke and Grace and there were flaws in every part of their dishes. Miin's broth for his Kiam Chye Ayam was tasty, but because he struggled with the noodles and had pivot to rice, the rest of the dish was affected as his duck was undercooked and under seasoned and the rice was bland. Jack's honey semifreddo was too sweet. Luke overcomplicated his paella, and because of that, his seafood was overcooked and the texture of the rice was more of a risotto. Grace's Mr Wolf ice cream sundae was delicious, but her vanilla bean ice cream has melted quickly that she worked so hard to bring back from disaster. While the judges felt that the bottom 4 dishes had missed the mark for various reasons, they felt that Miin's dish that shown the least technique, and he was eliminated.	1,232,000 / 714,000	#10
22/06-3	Tuesday, 26 May 2026	Team Relay Challenge — The remaining contestants were split into four teams of four, to compete in a team relay. They had to cook a dish that features Greek yoghurt. Each member will have 20 minutes to contribute to the dish, and 30 seconds to transfer the information to the next member. Out of the four teams, only one team managed to execute the vision properly and demonstrate excellent communication from start to finish. Against the flaws of the other dishes, the Purple Team won the challenge, and its members: Casper, Hannah, Jack, and Vinnie, will compete for immunity.	1,179,000 / 695,000	#11
23/06-4	Wednesday, 27 May 2026	Immunity Pin Challenge: Justine Schofield — Season 1 contestant Justine Schofield presented an immunity challenge that was close to her and Jean-Christophe's heart: classical French cuisine. Casper, Hannah, Jack, and Vinnie had 75 minutes to create their classical French dish. The catch is that the judges will taste each dish blindly after the cook. Jack's lobster bisque earned praise for the cooking of the lobster but the bisque was hollow and lacked body. Hannah's take on duck à l'orange was praised for the cooking of the duck, but the sauce was too sweet. While Casper's poulet rôti and boulangère potatoes earned strong reviews, it was no match to Vinnie's pâté en croûte, which was praised for its technicality and flavors, earning him the immunity pin.	986,000 / 592,000	#11
Week 7 (Perfect Pairs Week)
24/07-1	Sunday, 31 May 2026	Mystery box Challenge: Matt Sinclair & Daniel Dobra — All the challenges this week will revolve around pairs. To kick off the Perfect Pairs week, the contestants had to choose between two mystery boxes set by two guest judges: a home-style box set by Season 8 runner-up Matt Sinclair or a restaurant box set by chef Daniel Dobra. Whichever box they choose, they have 75 minutes to cook. The contestant who cooks the best dish from each box wins immunity from the next elimination. Aaron, Annabel, Alyona, Casper, Emily, Hannah, and Petro choose Daniel's restaurant box, while the rest choose to work with Matt's home-style box. Aaron and Annabel (who cooked with the restaurant box) and Pat and Jackie (who cooked with Matt's home-style box) had the top dishes of the day. The judges decided that Annabel, with her duck breast, potato gratin and radicchio and fig salad, and Pat, with his stuffed chicken Maryland, pumpkin and onion purée, had the best dish from each box category. As a result, Annabel and Pat won immunity from the next elimination.	1,066,000 / 655,000	#8
25/07-2	Monday, 1 June 2026	Classic Pairs Elimination Challenge — The remaining contestants (except Annabel and Pat) had to choose one out of the five classic flavor combinations: lime and chillies, honey and soy sauce, bacon and maple syrup, orange and fennel, and coconut and pineapple, to cook a dish in one hour to save their place in the competition. Aaron, Emily, Jack and Petro chose to meet the brief with chili and lime, Jackie chose to meet the brief with soy and honey, Lydia chose to meet the brief with bacon and maple, Ayona, Casper, Dot, Grace, Hannah and Luke chose to meet the brief fennel and orange and Olaolu chose to meet the brief with pineapple and coconut. After the tasting, Aaron (with chili and lime-cured kingfish tartare), Casper (with orange and fennel dessert), Hannah (with orange-glazed pork with braised fennel), and Lydia (with maple and bacon loukoumades) were deemed the best four performers. Meanwhile, Luke's fish was overcooked and Olaolu failed to highlight the coconut and pineapple pairing he had selected, and the dish as a whole was muted in flavors. With both dishes had flaws, the judges had to deicide based on which dish did a better job than the other by referring back to the brief. The decision came down to the flavour pairings they chose and how well it went with the dish and in a close decision, Olaolu was send home for missing the brief of the challenge.	1,300,000 / 741,000	#10
26/07-3	Tuesday, 2 June 2026	Invention Test: Reese's Peanut Butter Cup — The remaining contestants are facing an invention test in pairs, and their task is to create a dessert dish with chocolate and peanuts (the 2 main ingredients of the Reese's Peanut Butter Cups) as the main component in 75 minutes, and each pair had to make 4 servings of the dish. After the tasting, Dot and Pat's Chocolate and Peanut Banoffee Pie was the best dish of the night, and the judges praised the way they heroed the flavors without the banana being overpowering to the dish. Unfortunately, the pairings of Alyona and Lydia, and Annabel and Hannah cooked the least successful dishes. Alyona and Lydia's peanut butter ice cream failed to set, derailing the cohesion with the rest of the ingredients, while despite Annabel and Hannah's dish impressing in the tasting and the execution, they only served 2 servings instead of the required 4 servings. The 4 of them had to compete in the next elimination with Vinnie, who did not cook in Monday's elimination.	1,035,000 / 653,000	#11
27/07-4	Wednesday, 3 June 2026	Elimination Challenge: Time or Ingredients? — Alyona, Lydia, Annabel, Hannah, and Vinnie were faced with a time displacement challenge, where they had to gather their ingredients from one of the four hidden pantries, which would be unveiled every 15 minutes. Whichever pantry they chose, they had the use of their usual staple box. Vinnie decided to play the immunity pin to save himself from elimination. Lydia had 75 minutes to cook with herbs, spices, and alliums. Hannah and Annabel waited another 15 minutes to cook with the addition of fruit and vegetables. Alyona waited for the last two pantries to be unveiled, and she had 30 minutes to cook with the addition of flavour bombs and seafood. After the tasting, the judges deemed Alyona's decision to risk it all with her pan-seared scallops dish paid off, and she was the first to be declared safe. The bottom two were Annabel and Lydia, and while Annabel's ricotta and leeks gnocco fritto was disjointed, Lydia's onion tart had problems with the pastry, which was crumbly and greasy, and it was this poorly executed dish that eventually sent Lydia home.	1,108,000 / 695,000	#10
Week 8 (Aussie Classics Week)
28/08-1	Sunday, 7 June 2026	Mystery Box Challenge: Ice Cream and Pie — Aussie Classics Week kicks off with a mystery box set by chef, restaurateur, and MasterChef regular Curtis Stone, where everyone received either a pie or an ice cream. Those who got pies must create a family-sized pie with condiments or sides, while those who got ice cream must create an ice cream and showcase it as an element of a complete dessert. The judges are looking for the best pie and the best ice cream to earn immunity from the next elimination, and have their products on sale in all Coles supermarkets for a limited time. After tasting, the judges singled out Hannah's cheeseburger pie with fries and Pat's salted caramel ice cream with golden biscuit crumb and apple pie as the top 2 dishes, and the two of them earned immunity, plus Hannah's cheeseburger pie and Pat's salted caramel ice cream will be put for sale in all Coles supermarkets for a limited time, starting from the day after the episode aired.	964,000 / 589,000	#10
29/08-2	Monday, 8 June 2026	Elimination Challenge: Curtis Stone — After Curtis Stone presented the contestants with a display of various cuts of pork, the contestants (apart from Hannah and Pat) had 75 minutes to cook a pork dish that would save them from elimination. After the tasting, Dot's pork and peaches dish was declared the best of the night. The decision of elimination ultimately came down to Alyona and Jack. Alyona struggled throughout, and while the pork chop was cooked perfectly, the apple and fennel puree was grainy, and the dish lacked sauce. But, despite all the troubles, though, it was Jack's pork belly dish that fared worse, with an inconsistently cooked pork belly, a disjointed concept, and clashing flavor profiles. Those errors were enough to send Jack home.	1,212,000 / 704,000	#8
30/08-3	Tuesday, 9 June 2026	The Comeback Cook — As the competition reached the halfway mark, the remaining contestants will be taking a break for the day. Instead, 8 out of the 11 previously eliminated contestants (Jack, Bella, Miin, Lydia, Lucy, Belinda, Megs, and Alita) are given a chance to return to the competition in the second-chance cook. They had 75 minutes to cook a dish they hadn't had the opportunity to cook in the MasterChef kitchen so far. Although all the dishes were praised by the judges, 4 dishes were singled out as being the best: Lydia's Greek Salad, Lucy's scallops and corn noodle soup, Miin's Barramundi Masak Lemak, and Bella's 'Nonna's Garden' capsicum sorbet dessert. And it was Bella's dish that the judges considered had shown the most originality, technique, balance, and incredible flavor profile. For these reasons, she was reinstated into the competition, and she has also earned immunity from the next elimination.	1,127,000 / 694,000	#11
31/08-4	Wednesday, 10 June 2026	Elimination Challenge: Native Ingredients with Robert Irwin — Conservationist and television personality Robert Irwin presented 5 of his favorite native Australian ingredients: lillypilly, Davidson plums, lemon myrtle, wattleseed, and river mint. The contestants (except Bella) had 75 minutes to cook a dish featuring one of these 4 ingredients. After the tasting, Aaron's wattleseed ice cream, Annabel's cured coral trout, and Vinnie's crown roasted duck were the best dishes, with Robert deeming Vinnie's duck as the best duck he has ever eaten. But, despite some struggles throughout, Dot's river mint doughnuts was ultimately singled out as the least impressive dish, as the river mint flavor was overpowering throughout. This error ended her impressive run, as to the sadness of everybody, she was eliminated.	1,127,000 / 694,000	#11
Week 9 (Sweet Week)
32/09-1	Sunday, 14 June 2026	Zumbo's Sweet Lucky Dip — To commence Sweet Week, the remaining contestants were faced with a lineup of cloches. It was revealed that they will face a lucky dip challenge set by pastry chef and MasterChef regular Adriano Zumbo. Under each cloche, there is a different hero ingredient. They will select a cloche and the ingredient underneath will be revealed. They can pick again if they did not like the initial pick, but they will be stuck with the 2nd ingredient they picked. Whatever they pick, they must use the ingredient to cook their dessert creation in 75 minutes. The judges will pick the Top 3 performers to earn immunity from the next elimination. At the end of the day, it was Pat's Orange Mille-Feuille, Alyona's fish sauce ice cream, and Petro's tonka bean tart that were singled out as the top 3 and earning the makers immunity from the next elimination.	1,175,000 / 712,000	#15
33/09-2	Monday, 15 June 2026	Elimination Challenge: Ice Cream Taste Test — In this 2-round elimination challenge, the remaining contestants (apart from Pat, Alyona, and Petro) are going to participate in an ice cream taste test. One by one, they will all step up, pick an ice cream, taste, and correctly identify the flavors. Unfortunately, it was Casper (who mistook saffron for jackfruit), Annabel (who mistook orange for mango), Aaron (who mistook cauliflower for parsnip), and Jackie (who mistook watermelon for rockmelon) who got their answers wrong, and they ended up in round 2. In round 2, Casper, Annabel, Aaron, and Jackie have 75 minutes to cook a dessert using all the ingredients found on the ice cream from the first round, plus their usual staple pantry box. In the tasting, Annabel's brown butter ice cream dish and Aaron's tomato salad-inspired dessert shone in the judging, while Jackie and Casper faced the final verdict. The elements of Casper's Saffron and Orange Ice Cream were so subtle that it lacked definition in flavour and in texture. Jackie's financier for her figs and ice cream dessert creation was undercooked, and her granita took the dish in the wrong direction and because they were the foundations of her dish, the judges felt Jackie had missed the brief and she was eliminated.	1,266,000 / 744,000	#9
34/09-3	Tuesday, 16 June 2026	Air Fryer Desserts — In this challenge, the remaining contestants have 75 minutes to cook their desserts using a Tefal air fryer. In addition to that, they will not have access to the oven. The Top 4 dishes will earn their makers a chance to cook in the immunity challenge, and the overall top dish will earn a $5000 voucher from Harvey Norman. After tasting, Alyona's whiskey and miso chocolate torte, Pat's apple tarte tatin, Hannah's After Dark donuts, and Bella's apple meringue tart were selected as the top 4 dishes, and Alyona, Pat, Hannah, and Bella will compete for immunity. In addition, the judges singled out Pat for producing the best dish of the challenge, earning him the $5000 voucher.	1,100,000 / 696,000	#12
35/09-4	Wednesday, 17 June 2026	Immunity Pin Challenge: Beat The MasterChef with Jess Lemon — In this immunity challenge, Alyona, Pat, Hannah, and Bella had to beat former contestant Jessica 'Jess' Liemantara aka Jess Lemon, who previously competed in season 10, season 12, and Dessert Masters. The 4 contestants got to pick their core ingredients from the choices of raspberries, lemon, hazelnut, fennel, and ginger, while Jess got what was left, and they drew macarons to determine who would pick first. Bella got first pick, and she picked fennel. Alyona got second pick, and she picked the lemons. Pat got 3rd pick, and he picked raspberries, and Hannah got 4th pick, and she picked hazelnuts, leaving Jess with the ginger. The contestants have 75 minutes to create their desserts, featuring their chosen ingredient; Jess only has 60. All of the dishes, except Pat's raspberry and rhubarb tart (which over-reached the challenge, resulting in an undercooked pastry and frangipane) thrived in the judging, and despite particular praise for Bella's fennel and yuzu parfait and Hannah's hazelnut and orange tart, they were no match for the simplicity and innovation of Jess' Ginger Threads dessert, as Jess was declared the victor. Since neither of them could beat Jess, no one will be awarded an immunity pin this time.	932,000 / 535,000	#15
Week 10 (Masters Week)
36/10-1	Sunday, 21 June 2026	Mystery Box Challenge: Josh Niland — Masters Week is now in session! To begin the week, Josh Niland, known for his expertise in fish butchery, demonstrated how to head and tail on fillet, butterfly, and reverse butterfly a flathead. The remaining contestants will have 75 minutes to cook a dish with flathead as the main ingredient, utilizing one of the 3 techniques that Josh had demonstrated. After the tasting, the judges selected Annabel (with her stuffed flathead), Casper (with his Indonesian-style flathead two ways), and Petro (who redeemed himself from his poor fish cookery in the first week with his charcoal flathead) as the best 3 performers of the challenge. They all earned immunity from the next elimination as a result.	1,076,000 / 654,000	#10
37/10-2	Monday, 22 June 2026	Elimination Challenge: Curtis Stone — After a butchery demonstration from Curtis Stone, the contestants (except Annabel, Casper, and Petro) had an hour to cook a dish featuring flat iron steak. After tasting, the judges declared Pat (who paired his flat iron steak with cheesy polenta, tomato and bread salad, and chimichurri) and Vinnie (who risked the challenge by putting 2 applications of a flat iron steak: steak tartare with crostini and grilled steak with salsa verde) as the top 2 performers. The bottom 2 were between Alyona and Bella. Alyona struggled in the challenge, but while her steak was overcooked, Bella's was undercooked, and the sauce lacked definition, resulting in Bella's second elimination.	1,165,000 / 693,000	#12
38/10-3	Tuesday, 23 June 2026	What's Under the Cloche? with Tom Sarafian — Acclaimed chef and restaurateur Tom Sarafian presented his elevated hummus dish, a signature dish of his restaurant, Zareh, which took 3 years of development. With that in mind, the challenge is to reimagine the dish, with a dip, a topping, and an accompanying item to dip in, in one hour. After the tasting, Petro's Taramasalata with seafood topping and flatbread was considered the best dish. Unfortunately, Emily's Thai inspired dip was more of a sauce and the squid topping was big and chewy, Grace's labneh and beetroot dip lacked complexity, her tuna tartare element was incompatible, and the chips were too thin, Aaron's laksa dip was too dip from the macadamia and roti was undercooked and Luke's potatoes were inconsistent and clumsy despite an okay dip. Having cooked the bottom 4 dishes, Aaron, Emily, Grace and Luke were send to the pressure test.	1,139,000 / 689,000	#11
39/10-4	Wednesday, 24 June 2026	Pressure Test: Kirsten Tibballs — Kirsten Tibballs presented one of her greatest masterpieces so far, the Chocolate Iris, with over 100 steps, for Emily, Grace, Aaron and Luke to replicate in 3 hours and 45 minutes. After the tasting, both Luke and Emily impressed the judges with their take on the dish, so Grace and Aaron faced the final verdict. While Aaron's chocolate decoration lacked finesse and was not similar to Kirsten's, it came down to the imbalance of sponge and crémeux on Grace's entremet. Although Grace's dish looked very similar to Kirsten's, it tasted very different and she was eliminated, finalizing the top 10.	1,091,000 / 648,000	#13
Week 11 (Knockout Week)
40/11-1	Sunday, 28 June 2026	We're Seeing Double: Masterchef Babies — Welcome to Knockout Week! Throughout the week, the Top 10 must survive 3 challenges to spare themselves from elimination, and if they end up as the bottom performer on any of the challenges, they will be catapulted straight to elimination at the end of the week. To begin the week, they welcomed 3-time competitor Sarah Todd, who had previously competed on season 6, season 14, and season 17 and her partner, 2-time competitor Declan Cleary, who previously appeared on season 15 and season 17, alongside their twin babies, Claudia and Charlotte. Inspired by Claudia and Charlotte, the Top 10 were split into 5 pairs to face The Wall challenge, where they had 75 minutes to turn the ingredients in Sarah and Declan's mystery box into a dish that is the same in look and taste to each other. After the tasting, the show handed Sarah a box filled with 2 MasterChef white aprons for Claudia and Charlotte. The Yellow Team (Petro and Pat)'s risk-taking with cooking the chateaubriand on the hibachi paid off as they managed to create the best-tasting dish of the night. The dishes of the Orange Team (Casper and Emily) and the Green Team (Annabel and Alyona) failed the similarity test, but in a close call, the flavour and ambition of the Green Team's dish saved them. And as a result, Emily and Casper were the first to face elimination at the end of the week.	1,061,000 / 615,000	#12
41/11-2	Monday, 29 June 2026	Battle of The Fridges — In the second challenge of the Knockout Week, the remaining 8 must pick one of the judges' LG fridges, without knowing what the contents are. After picking a fridge, the judges will use the InstaView mode to reveal the ingredients. Then, they will have 75 minutes to turn the contents inside the respective judge's fridge into a dish. Following the tasting, Petro, who picked Poh's fridge, triumphed with the inventiveness of his Greek-Asian fusion of filo cigars with coconut and pandan crème pâtissière, and he won a $5,000 LG voucher. Unfortunately, Luke, the only one who picked Sofia's fridge, delivered a Portuguese tart that was burnt and an ice cream that, despite praise for its taste, was misplaced. Similarly, Hannah, the only one who picked Jean-Christophe's fridge, served a chicken breast dish that had overall flaws. As a result, Hannah and Luke will both join Emily and Casper in the elimination round.	1,155,000 / 669,000	#12
42/11-3	Tuesday, 30 June 2026	Jean-Christophe's Kitchen Chaos — In the final challenge of the Knockout Week, the remaining 6 were split into 2 opposing teams of 3, and they have to cook a 2-course fine dining lunch for 16 farmers and producers featuring a different core ingredient (pineapple for the Yellow Team and oranges for the Orange Team) under the mentorship of Andy for the Yellow Team and Jean-Christophe for the Orange Team. After the challenge is over, both the Yellow Team's pineapple and coconut dessert and the Orange Team's Chocolate Orange Eclair were praised, despite the Yellow Team deciding to ditch their roti element due to time constraints. But while the Yellow Team's roasted pork chop and pineapple sambal was praised, the Orange Team's duck breast with orange sauce lacked orange flavour. As a result, the Yellow Team won the challenge. Its members — Aaron, Annabel and Vinnie — all earned immunity from the next elimination challenge, and will also have the power to influence the next elimination challenge.	1,190,000 / 652,000	#12
43/11-4	Wednesday, 1 July 2026	Massamman Mash — In this elimination challenge of Knockout Week, Aaron, Annabel, and Vinnie, who all won immunity from the challenge, were asked to go to Coles and purchase one ingredient that the others have to highlight in their dish. Aaron chose short ribs, Annabel picked leeks, and Vinnie selected mussels. The remaining contestants have to pick one ingredient to be highlighted in their dish. They have 75 minutes to complete the challenge. After the challenge is over, Alyona's Mussels with Dashi Broth and Petro's Leek and Scallops dish were declared the Top 2 dishes of the challenge, while Luke's Massaman Curry, Emily's Rendang, and Pat's Charred Leek Agnolotti were also praised. Unfortunately, Casper and Hannah were in the bottom 2. Neither of the 2 managed to highlight mussels in their dish (Casper's decision to put pipis overpowered the mussel flavors despite the dish being tasty, while Hannah's mussels were inconsistently cooked), but the judges decided that Hannah's dish had the most technical flaws, including the amount of pasta, which changed the dish's focus, that ultimately sending her home.	1,079,000 / 665,000	#14
Week 12
44/12-1	Sunday, 5 July 2026	Sanjeev's Indian Flavoured Mystery Box — As a new week began, the remaining contestants will face another mystery box, set by celebrity chef and cookbook author Sanjeev Kapoor. They have to turn the ingredients from Sanjeev's Indian mystery box and a special Indian-inspired underbench pantry into a dish in 75 minutes. After the tasting, despite Emily's sweet moong dal dosa receiving rave reviews, she was lost to Casper and his sweet potato and spinach curry, which was deemed one of his best dishes thus far, winning him immunity from the next elimination challenge and a special private masterclass with Sanjeev.	1,020,000 / 618,000	#11
45/12-2	Monday, 6 July 2026	Elimination Challenge: International Ingredient — The remaining contestants (except Casper, who earned immunity) were shown 5 international ingredients that locals in the respective countries loves: bottarga (Italy), sansho peppers (Japan), banana blossom (Vietnam), Alheira sausage (Portugal), and juniper berries (Sweden). They were all given 75 minutes to deliver a dish that features one of these international ingredients. After the tasting, Alyona's Juniper Ice Cream and Pat's Juniper Roo kangaroo dish were deemed the top 2, and Pat was deemed the best performer, winning him the $10.000 travel voucher from Trafalgar. Unfortunately, Annabel, Vinnie and Emily landed in the bottom 3. Annabel's grilled octopus dish was tasty, but the bottarga flavors were lacking, and the dish felt too safe. Vinnie's prawn and bottarga ravioli hit the brief of heroing the bottarga, but the dish lacked balance and his usual finesse. Emily's Filipino spring rolls were tasty, and her sauce was well balanced, but her decision to use a crepe pancake for the wrapper was too thick, and because of that, the banana blossom flavor was undetected at all. As the primary objective of the challenge, the judges felt that Emily had missed the brief, and she was eliminated.	1,149,000 / 677,000	#16
46/12-3	Tuesday, 7 July 2026	Immunity Challenge: Ice Cream — The Top 8 were welcomed with a cart filled with Connoisseur Ice Creams, where everyone would draw an ice cream with a different flavor. Casper got Mint and Cookies, Petro got Salted Caramel and Macadamia, Aaron got Vanilla Caramel Brownie, Luke got Pistachio Gelato, Alyona got Rocky Road, Pat got Mango and Coconut, Annabel got Honeycomb and Australian Honey and Vinnie got Almond Biscotti. The ice cream flavor will be the inspiration for their dessert creation, and they have 75 minutes to complete the creation. The Top 4 performers in this challenge are Vinnie (with his almond biscotti tart), Aaron (with his flourless chocolate sponge), Petro (with his salted caramel and macadamia éclairs), and Pat (with his toasted coconut and white chocolate cremeaux). All 4 of them were safe, while the rest of them have to duke it out in the next elimination.	1,109,000 / 658,000	#14
47/12-4	Wednesday, 8 July 2026	Sam Aisbett's Pressure Test: Complex Crab — Sam Aisbett from Akuna in Ho Chi Minh City set the pressure test, where Alyona, Annabel, Luke, and Casper had to replicate Sam's version of a crab salad in 3 hours. With limited time on the clock, it was tremendous pressure for the 4 chefs. After the tasting, Annabel stood out with her version of Sam's dish, to the point that Sam would hire her. Luke's dish also stood out despite minor flaws in palm heart texture and the dish's balance. While Casper's dish impressed in taste and presentation, the dish contained crab shells, which was criticised. Alyona struggled the most, and despite her efforts to catch up, her crab salad did not have the dressing, was too salty, and the macadamia was too chunky. Ultimately, the judges felt that Alyona had missed the brief and she was eliminated, leaving Annabel as the last female standing.	908,000 / 533,000	#16
Week 13 (Heat Week)
48/13-1	Sunday, 12 July 2026	Mystery Box Challenge: Marion Grasby — Heat Week is on! Throughout the first 3 challenges of the week, the best-performing contestant from each challenge will be safe from elimination for the rest of the week. For the first challenge, season 2 contestant, TV personality and food personality Marion Grasby demonstrated how she would use heat from spices (steamed Thai green curry gyoza) on a savory and sweet dish (flaming hot and numbing Bombe Alaska). Then, the contestants revealed Marion's mystery box, where they have 75 minutes to cook a dish with a spicy kick. After the judges tasted all the dishes, 3 dishes stood out as the best: Luke's crispy roast pork, Petro's chargrilled pork belly, and Casper's chili and lime pork belly, and it was the latter's dish that was stood out as the best, winning him immunity for the rest of the week.	1,064,000 / 661,000	#18
49/13-2	Monday, 13 July 2026	Immunity Challenge: 60 Minute Hot Chilli Dish — In the 2nd challenge on Heat week, the remaining contestants (except Casper) had an hour to cook a dish utilizing one of the 4 chilies that was grown in the MasterChef garden: birdseye, jalapeño, red cayenne, and green cayenne. After the tasting, despite Aaron's Malaysian-style Chili Crab earning rave reviews, it lost to the technicality of Annabel's butterflied King George Whiting with Thai Red Curry sauce, sending her to safety for the rest of the week.	1,165,000 / 718,000	#12
50/13-3	Tuesday, 14 July 2026	Hibachi Challenge — In the final challenge on Heat Week, the remaining contestants (apart from Casper and Annabel) had 75 minutes to cook a dish with a hibachi grill as their only heat source. After the tasting, Luke's Australian version of Sate Kambing received praise, received positive feedback, and was deemed a confident dish, but he lost to the risk-taking and innovation of Petro, who cooked a dessert of charred corn ice cream, as Petro earned the last safe spot from the elimination, while Luke, Vinnie, Aaron, and Pat will all duke it out in the elimination.	1,135,000 / 702,000	#12
51/13-4	Wednesday, 15 July 2026	Elimination Challenge: Head to Head — In this Heat Week elimination, Luke, Vinnie, Aaron, and Pat will compete in one of the 2 head-to-head duels. The 4 will draw a token to decide the head-to-head duels. Luke and Vinnie drew Smoke, which means they will face off against each other and have to incorporate smoke into their dishes. Similarly, Aaron and Pat, who drew fire, will also have to face each other with a dish that incorporates a flambé technique in their dish. They have 45 minutes to complete the challenge. In the battle of the smoke, Vinnie's scotch fillet, despite initial concerns about the amount of smoke, impressed the judges and managed to beat Luke's s'mores-inspired dessert, which had an unset cremeaux and technical issues with the meringue, which he used the siphon to make. In the battle of the fire, while both dishes received praise, Aaron's innovation with his drunken prawns with egg floss narrowly beat Pat's pan-seared barramundi. Luke and Pat then face off in one final battle, where they have 60 minutes to cook any dish they like. During the tasting, both of them delivered dishes with minor flaws. Luke's kingfish mosaic was praised for its elegance, but the kingfish was overshadowed by the nori, while Pat's charred octopus was full of flavor, but the octopus was cooked inconsistently. Unfortunately, despite a good run, Pat's dish just missed the mark, which resulted in his elimination.	985,000 / 617,000	#16
Week 14 (Judge's Level Up Week)
52/14-1	Sunday, 19 July 2026	Immunity Challenge: Sofia's Single Ingredient — In every challenge throughout the week, the challenge had been specially personalised by one of the judges. In this first challenge, Sofia had set up 4 mystery boxes, each containing one single ingredient (onion, yuzu, beetroot, and almonds). The contestant had to pick one of the ingredients and cook the dish using that one ingredient, plus their usual pantry staples, without access to the pantry or garden, in 75 minutes. After the tasting, it was Aaron and Vinnie, with their onion pasta dishes, that secured the top 2 dishes, and Vinnie's agnolotti with onion broth beat Aaron's onion tortellini with charred onion broth to secure him the first place in the Top 5, while the others had to compete in the next elimination challenge.	1,005,000 / 641,000	#12
53/14-2	Monday, 20 July 2026	Elimination Challenge: Jean-Christophe's Saucy Evening — This time, the challenge was set by Jean-Christophe, and after he demonstrated how to make 2 sauces: Espagnole and Velouté, the contestants (except Vinnie) had to choose one of them and use it to make a dish in 75 minutes. After the tasting, Annabel, who used the velouté for her modernized Fish and Chips, and Petro, who paired his Espagnole sauce with his duck breast, were declared the top 2 dishes, while Aaron and Luke landed in the bottom 2. Aaron's dish had inconsistently cooked scallops and a velouté that was too salty, but while Luke's Espagnole sauce was glossy, it was too sweet and failed to complement the dish, and despite the lamb rack being cooked perfectly, the fat cap was not rendered, derailing the quality of the dish, and that was enough to send Luke home and finalizing the Top 5.	1,174,000 / 720,000	#14
54/14-3	Tuesday, 21 July 2026	Keeping Up With Andy Allen — In this challenge, the Top 5 will have to follow Andy Allen in cooking one of his dishes from the menu of his restaurant Three Blue Ducks, barbecued lamb with burnt eggplant cream and braised borlotti beans. There is no recipe provided, and they had to complete their dish within 15 seconds after Andy completed his dish. After tasting, although all the dishes were praised, Vinnie was singled out for his composure and his ability to keep up with him throughout the challenge, so he was safe and became the first contestant to enter the Finals Week, while the rest, had to fight it out in the pressure test.	1,183,000 / 725,000	#9
55/14-4	Wednesday, 22 July 2026	Pressure Test: Poh's Malaysian Snacks — The final challenge of the Judges Level-Up Week had Poh presenting a trio of Malaysian snacks, consisting of curry puffs, kue lapis, and kuih koci, for Annabel, Aaron, Petro, and Casper to replicate in 3 hours and 15 minutes. Being Malaysian-Chinese, Aaron came to this challenge eager to impress and honor his traditions, and it paid off as it was praised for its execution. He, alongside Petro, who also impressed with his take on the dish, were through to Finals Week. It all came down to Casper, whose kue lapis was praised, but the kuih koci was undercooked at the bottom, and there were flaws in his curry puff's lamination, and Annabel. While Annabel's curry puff was praised, the kue lapis was undercooked and pasty, and the kuih koci were cooked inconsistently. And those errors were enough of a disappointment to send Annabel home as the last standing female, just shy of finals week.	1,075,000 / 671,000	#13
Week 15 (Finals Week)
56/15-1	Sunday, 26 July 2026	Immunity Challenge: Dishes Fit for a Duchess with Meghan, Duchess of Sussex — For the first challenge in Finals Week, the Top 4 (and all the other eliminated contestants as supporters) were surprised by the arrival of Meghan, Duchess of Sussex as the guest judges for this challenge. After Meghan revealed some of her favorite seasonal produce: lemons, macadamia nuts, honey, quince, strawberries, celeriac, apples, mandarin oranges, Brussels sprouts, Jerusalem artichoke, and rainbow carrots, the Top 4 had 75 minutes to pick one of those seasonal produce and cook a dish worthy of Meghan herself. Despite all 4 being praised for their dishes, the Top 2 are between Casper's octopus and Jerusalem artichoke dish and Petro's celeriac ice cream. Ultimately, Petro's innovation with his dish gave him the edge, and he secured the first spot in the Semi-Finals.	1,160,000 / 738,000	#11
57/15-2	Monday, 27 July 2026	Elimination Challenge: Letters From Home — In the final elimination challenge before the semi-finals, Vinnie, Aaron, Casper, and Petro all received letters from home. In addition to that, Vinnie, Aaron, and Casper received different ingredients alongside their letters (green grapes for Casper, sardines for Vinnie, and garlic for Aaron), which they must hero in their dish, and they have 75 minutes to complete their dish, with 2 semi-final spots at stake. After tasting, Aaron's garlic and Spanner crab linguine stood out in the tasting, and he advanced to the semi-finals. Vinnie's sardines dish received praise for its flavors, but the cooking of his sardines lacked finesse. Casper's green grapes cremeaux was praised for its technicality, but the white chocolate was overpowering the flavor of the grapes. As Casper failed to hero the ingredient given, he was sent home just shy of the semi-finals, and setting the stage for an all-Victorian finale.	1,155,000 / 691,000	#12
Week 16 (Semi-Final Week)
58/16-1	Sunday, 2 August 2026	The Fun One: Contestants versus Judges — In this episode, judges Jean-Christophe and Poh will compete in a 60-minute challenge by cooking a dish featuring potatoes. Jean-Christophe presented a chicken mousse dariole with crispy potatoes. The dish was divine, but it was covered with long chives that he ran out of time to chop. Poh decided to attempt a dish that eliminated her in season 12, the culurgiones. This time, Poh managed to nail the dish and won the round. In the next challenge, Jean-Christophe and Poh will compete against the Top 3 to create a family feast, judged by Sofia, Dot, and Luke. The Top 3's version of the Boys' Barbecue Feast was praised for the cooking of the steak and the prawns, but the potato gratin was wet. Petro's cake, which was made using Poh's recipe, was too hot when decorated, but he nailed it. Jean-Christophe and Poh cooked a French Feast, and despite the lack of communication and working separately, it was deemed cohesive and flawless and they won the round.	1,065,000 / 605,000	#11
59/16-2	Monday, 3 August 2026	Semi-Final: Service Challenge — In this Semi-Final challenge, Petro, Aaron, and Vinnie will face a service challenge, where they had to conceptualize and cook a 2-course meal to 20 diners each, plus the judges, under the guidance of Andy, in 3 hours. All 3 decided to lean into their respective heritage for their dishes. Petro leaned into his Greek-Cypriot heritage with his beef tenderloin main and Greek-style éclair dessert. Vinnie leaned into his Italian heritage with his Porchetta main and Tiramisu tart dessert, while Aaron decided to keep the Asian fusion theme with his pork loin main and basil and white pepper ice cream for dessert. Unfortunately for Aaron, the clashing flavor profiles in the main cost him the place in the finale, against the universal praise of Vinnie and Petro's efforts, and in a close decision, Aaron was eliminated in 3rd place, leaving Petro and Vinnie to duke it out in the finale.	1,388,000 / 729,000	#9
Week 17 (Grand Finale Week)
60/17-1	Sunday, 9 August 2026	Grand Finale — In this grand finale, 2 Victorian lads, Petro and Vinnie, will compete head-to-head in 2 rounds to determine the season's winner. In the first round, Petro and Vinnie faced a Superstar Mystery Box, inspired by some incredible guest judges who had graced the season: Cavolo nero (Jimmy and Jane Barnes), Jerusalem artichoke (Meghan, Duchess of Sussex), onion (Sanjeev Kapoor), lemon (Jess Lemon), flathead (Josh Niland), sichuan peppercorns (Marion Grasby). black garlic (Sarah Todd), duck (Matt Sinclair & Daniel Dobra), ooray plum (Robert Irwin), sage (Maggie Beer) and chocolate (Kirsten Tibballs). They had 75 minutes to complete the dishes in the first round. Vinnie initially tried to cook a duck dish, with spicy and sweet glazed duck and ooray plums, but he overcooked the duck, forcing him to pivot and create a new dish with 15 minutes to go. He ended up plating butterflied barbecued flathead with Jerusalem artichoke and caramelized onion puree, and sage oil instead, which was deemed better than his original idea. Petro's Sichuan pepper tart with Jerusalem artichoke chips was delicious, but with minor criticisms of being slightly unbalanced and overcooked on the edges and lacking artichoke chips. Vinnie scored 10 from Jean-Christophe and 9 each from Poh, Sofia, and Andy, giving a total score of 37. Petro earned 10 from Jean-Christophe, 8 from Poh, and 7 each from Sofia and Andy, giving him a total score of 32. For the second round, award-winning pastry chef and Bake Off: The Professionals judge Cherish Finden sets up the final pressure test, where Petro and Vinnie had to replicate Finden's Chinese Afternoon Tea, comprising 9 mini desserts (3 firecrackers, 3 black sesame teapots, and 3 mandarin oranges), all in 5 hours. It was time under tremendous pressure for the title, as they struggled with the recipe: Vinnie misread some part of the recipe, while Petro accidentally skipped a page in the recipe. During the tasting, Vinnie's take on the dish was praised, unfortunately, the cheesecake inside the sesame teapot was overcooked and the curd inside was slightly overcooked, as a result, the entire sesame teapot was dense. Petro's sesame teapot was praised, despite it was unfinished. Unfortunately, he had notable flaws with his other 2 desserts: the mousse for the mandarin component was overwhipped and dense, despite winning praise for taste, and the pandan mousse for the firecracker had an unpleasant taste because he left the pandan leaves sitting too long in the mixture. Ultimately, Petro's mistakes cost him the title, as he scored 7 from all the judges (Andy, Poh, Cherish, Sofia, and Jean-Christophe), giving him a grand total score of 67 points. Vinnie's efforts received 8 each from Jean-Christophe and Cherish, and 9 each from Andy, Sofia, and Poh, giving him a grand total score of 80. Vinnie Gibaldi was declared the winner of the season, winning him $250.000. Petro Papathomas, as the runner-up, was given $40.000. Aaron Kher, who finished 3rd, was given $10.000.	1,435,000/ 830,000	#5

== Awards and nominations ==
Year	Award	Category	Recipients and nominees	Result	Refs.
2026	66th Logie Awards	Best Competition Reality Program	Masterchef Australia	Won	
2026	66th Logie Awards	Most Popular Personality on Australian Television	Poh Ling Yeow	Nominated	
