= Grasby (surname) =

Grasby (also spelled Grassby) is an English language surname of toponymic (habitation/location) origin.

Notable people with the surname include:

- Marion Grasby (born 1982), Australian cook and food entrepreneur of Anglo-Celtic Australian and Thai Australian heritage.
- William Grasby (1859–1930), Australian agricultural journalist and educationist
- Al Grassby (1926–2005), Australian politician
- Bertram Grassby (1880–1953), English silent movie actor
- Ellnor Grassby (born 1937), Australian politician
