= Simon Boyle (chef) =

British chef, author and social entrepreneur

- Born: Glasgow, Scotland
- Culinary career
- Awards won: 2020 Special recognition, relief work in London during Covid-19, Basque Culinary World Prize; 2018 Extra Mile Award, Foodservice Cateys; 2017 Fellowship by Royal Academy of Culinary Arts; 2017 Education Training and Jobs Business of the Year by Social Enterprise UK; 2015 Lord Mayor's Dragon Award; 2013 Peoples Choice Award by Craft Guild of Chefs
- Website: Simon Boyle

Simon Boyle is a British chef, author and social entrepreneur working in Britain. Boyle became a Fellow of the Royal Academy of Culinary Arts in 2017. In 2020 he was awarded special recognition by the Basque Culinary World Prize for his relief work in London during the COVID-19 crisis.

== Life and career ==
Boyle was born in Glasgow, Scotland and attended Bournemouth and Poole College to start his culinary training. He was awarded the Specialised Chefs Scholarship, arranged by the Royal Academy of Culinary Arts. Sponsored by The Savoy Hotel London, Boyle completed his apprenticeship at the 5* hotel.

Boyle went on to become part of the Michelin-star winning team at Chewton Glen and then worked as a chef on cruise ships and luxury vessels, including Oriana on P&O Cruises and MV Minerva with Swan Hellenic. He was appointed the first Culinary Ambassador for Unilever in 2002.

After volunteering in Sri Lanka following the 2004 Indian Ocean earthquake and tsunami, Boyle returned to the UK to set up a food events company that also helped homeless people. Boyle appeared on BBC’s Dragons' Den in 2008 to pitch for funding, which was unsuccessful.

In 2010, Boyle formed a partnership between his social enterprise – the Beyond Food Foundation, with PricewaterhouseCoopers, De Vere (hotel operator) and the Homes and Communities Agency, who invested £800,000 in a new restaurant and training concept. The Brigade restaurant and training school in London Bridge has been running since 2010. The concept helps get homeless people off the streets through food training programmes and apprenticeships. All profits of the restaurant are shared with charities and social enterprises.

In 2020, Boyle responded to the Covid-19 pandemic with a number of initiatives to help vulnerable people and hospitality workers facing unemployment and homelessness due to the crisis. He cooked food for disadvantaged communities – an initiative that was awarded special recognition by the Basque Culinary World Prize 2020. He also developed the Made Again programme for Beyond Food, which consisted of virtual coaching workshops to help vulnerable hospitality workers adapt their skills to find employment. Notably, Boyle also created the Feast With Purpose cookbook during the UK Covid-19 lockdown, where he encouraged 140 chefs – including Michel Roux Jnr., Rick Stein, Nathan Outlaw and Tom Kerridge – to create recipes for the book. All proceeds are supporting hospitality workers affected by the Covid-19 crisis.

== Recognition ==
Former prime minister David Cameron and Boris Johnson in his role as Mayor of London have visited Boyle at Brigade. Cameron called Brigade a "most impressive social enterprise". Johnson said: "This is ethical capitalism" and "social enterprise at its best." Boyle's series of supper clubs at Brigade have involved guest chefs including Michel Roux Jr (Le Gavroche), Shay Cooper (The Goring) and Chris King (The Langdown).

In March 2018, Boyle was invited to the House of Commons All Party Parliamentary Group for London to advise the government on how they could better support social enterprises. Boyle said the government's competitive contracting of funding was "soul destroying" and urged the government to do more to recognise the work social enterprises are doing.

Boyle won the People's Choice Award by the Craft Guild of Chefs in 2013. He was awarded an Honorary Diploma and named an Honorary Head of State Chef by Le Club des Chefs des Chefs in 2015. The same year, he also won the Lord Mayor's Dragon Award. In 2016, he was named one of the Top 1,000 Most Influential People in London by the London Evening Standard and in 2017, Boyle won the Education Training and Jobs Business of the Year at the Social Enterprise UK Awards. In 2017, Boyle gained a Royal Academy of Culinary Arts Fellowship. In 2018, Boyle was awarded the prestigious Extra Mile Award at the Foodservice Cateys, and in 2020 he was given special recognition for his relief work in London during the COVID-19 crisis by the Basque Culinary World Prize.

Boyle regularly appears in the media, including the BBC Radio London Robert Elms show, Jazz FM (UK), The Caterer and Produce Business UK. He also judges industry events, including The Teflon Diamond Standard Awards.

=== Books ===
- Feast With Purpose, author and contributor, Chef Media, 2020. ISBN 978-1908202987
- How to Cook and Keep Cooking, author, Penguin, 2018. ISBN 978-1529103267
- How to Find a Job and Keep It, author, Penguin, 2016. ISBN 9781473550605
- The Chef Book, contributor, Peter Marshall publisher, 2015. ISBN 1908202203
- Recipes for Life: Inspired Cooking Beyond Cancer, contributor, 2013. ISBN 1908202173
