= Andrew Cooke =

Andrew or Andy Cooke may refer to:

- Andrew Cooke (fl. 1909–1911), American banker and namesake of the Cooke Dam in Michigan
- Andrew B. Cooke (fl. 1953–1983), original owner of the Andrew B. Cooke House in Virginia Beach, Virginia
- Andy Cooke (police officer) (born 1964), British police officer
- Andy Cooke (born 1974), English footballer

== See also ==
- Andrew Cook (disambiguation)
- Andy Cooks (born 1985), New Zealand chef and YouTuber
