= Benoit Blin =

French pastry chef (born 1967)

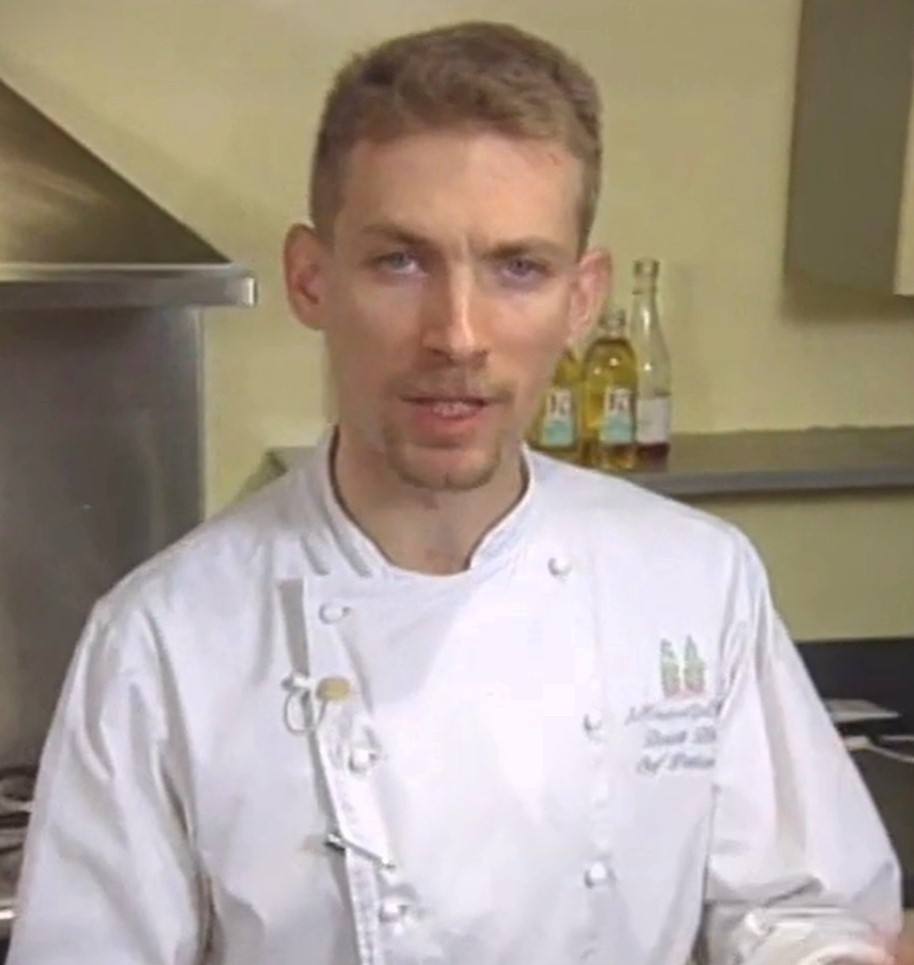
Blin in 1998

Benoit Blin (born 17 October 1967) is a French pastry chef and food judge. After serving two apprenticeships and national service in the French Navy, Blin worked at the Normandy Hotel and the Hôtel Ritz Paris in Paris. In 1995 he was persuaded by Raymond Blanc to join the staff of his Le Manoir aux Quat'Saisons restaurant in England and has remained there ever since. Blin has judged competitions including the Royal Academy of Culinary Arts' Master of Culinary Arts and, since 2016, has been a judge on the television show Bake Off: The Professionals. He published his first cookbook in 2024.

== Early life ==
Blin was born in Villedieu-les-Poêles, Normandy, France. He was apprenticed to one of the two bakeries in the small town he grew up in, before serving a second apprenticeship as a pastry chef. The first product that Blin learned to bake was a chouquette, an item he still produces regularly. Blin completed his year of national service as a chef in the French Navy, providing food to the officers' mess in Cherbourg. During this time he made a mistake whilst chopping a tomato and cut off the ends of some of his fingers with a butcher's knife. Blin persuaded the navy to allow him time to study for the Brevet de Maîtrise Pâtissier (master pastry chef's certificate) and completed it within the year. After completing his service Blin worked at the Normandy Hotel in Deauville before becoming senior pastry sous chef at the Hôtel Ritz Paris in Paris in 1991.

== At Le Manoir aux Quat'Saisons ==
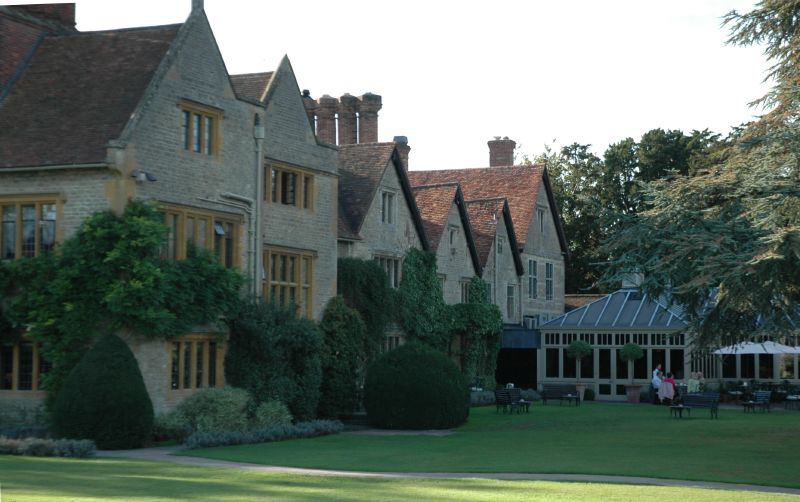
Le Manoir aux Quat'Saisons

Blin left the Ritz in 1994 and married in the autumn, he has at least one son. In January 1995, after three months trying, he was persuaded by Raymond Blanc to join the staff of his two–Michelin Star restaurant, Le Manoir aux Quat'Saisons in Oxfordshire, England, as its pastry chef. Blin remains at the restaurant and leads a team of 13 chefs.

In 2005 he received the Royal Academy of Culinary Arts' Master of Culinary Arts award, granted only once every four years. In 2026, he participated in the Master of Culinary Arts presentation to 4 new honorees at a prestigious four-course dinner.

Blin won the Pastry Chef of the Year award in 2009, and has also won the Meilleur Ouvrier de France. By 2017 Blin was chairman of the UK Pastry Cup Coupe du Monde which supports a British pastry team in international competitions and develops young chefs. He was president of the British team in the 2011 World Pastry Cup. By 2016 he was chairman of the UK Pastry Club.

Blin has worked extensively as a competition judge. He has judged the finals of the Master Of Culinary Arts awards, the British Culinary Federation Chef competition; both the British and European Sugar Championships; the UK Pastry Open and the UK's National Chef of the Year awards. In 2016 he became a judge on the BBC's Bake Off: Crème de la Crème television baking competition and has remained for its subsequent series on Channel 4 as Bake Off: The Professionals.

Blin's first book Bake with Benoit Blin: Master Cakes, Pastries and Desserts Like a Professional, was published in July 2024.
