= Andrew Cook =

Andrew or Andy Cook may refer to:

- Andrew B. Cook (1864–1928), Montana state auditor
- Andrew F. Cook, Jr. (1920–1942), U.S. Marine Corps officer killed at the Battle of Guadalcanal
- Sir Andrew Cook (businessman) (born 1949), British businessman, chairman of William Cook Group
- Andrew Cook (author), British author, biographer and historian
- Andy Cook (baseball) (born 1967), American baseball pitcher
- Andy Cook (footballer, born 1969), English footballer who played for Southampton, Exeter City, and Swansea City
- Andrew Cook, British guitarist and singer with the band Stapleton
- Andy Cook (footballer, born 1990), English footballer playing for Bradford City
- Andrew Cook, a character in Dr. Quinn, Medicine Woman played by Brandon Douglas

== See also ==
- Andrew Cooke (disambiguation)
- Andy Cooks (born 1985), New Zealand chef and YouTuber
