= Australians in Thailand =

Australian community in Thailand

Total population
- 20,000 (2008)

Regions with significant populations
- Bangkok, Pattaya, Chiang Rai

Languages
- Australian English · Thai

Religion
- Theravada Buddhism, Christianity

Related ethnic groups
- Australian diaspora

Australians in Thailand are a population of over 20,000, the largest concentration of them residing in Bangkok. Thailand remains a popular tourist and transit destination, with over 830,000 Australians visiting the country in 2014 alone.

Aussie Bar Phuket is an Australian themed pub and restaurant and is the oldest and busiest pub on Phuket.

== See also ==
- Thai Australians
- Australia–Thailand relations
- Little Australia
