= Australia–Thailand relations =

- Australia: Thailand

Diplomatic mission
- Royal Thai Embassy, Canberra: Embassy of Australia, Bangkok

Envoy
- Arjaree Sriratanaban: Angela Macdonald

Foreign relations exist between Australia and Thailand. Thailand is represented through its embassy in Canberra and a consulate general in Sydney. Australia has an embassy in Bangkok. Formal diplomatic relations were established between the two nations in 1952.

== History ==
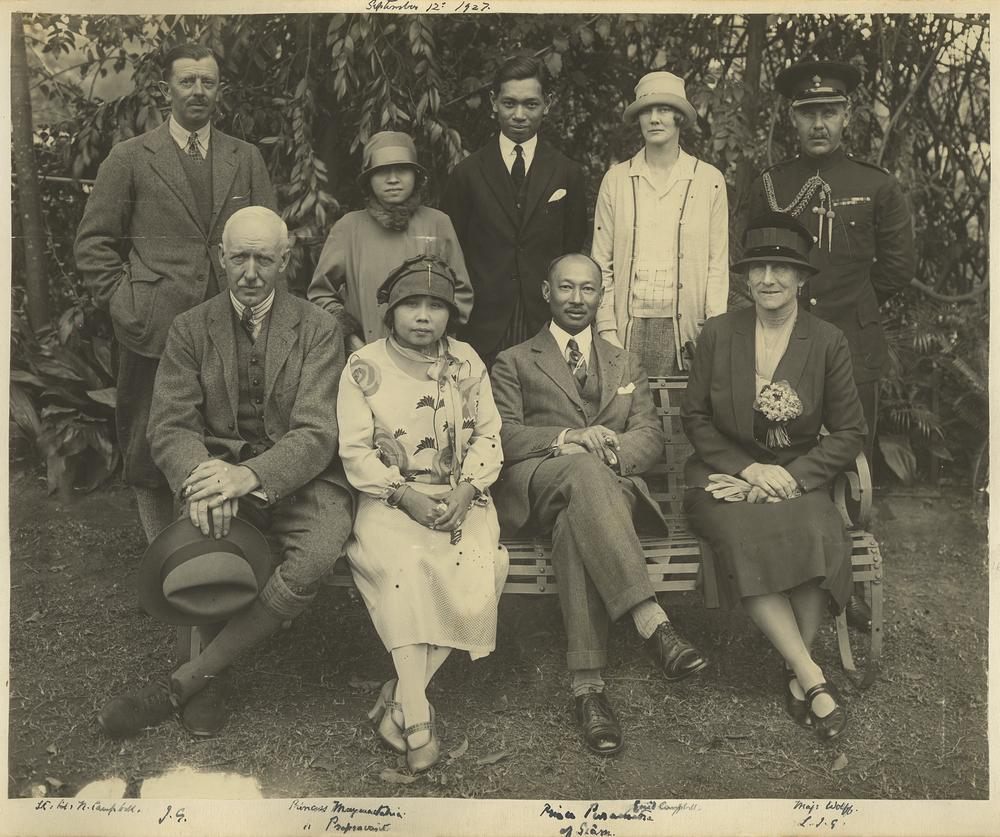
Queensland Governor John Goodwin and Prince Purachatra, along with others, in Brisbane, 1927

=== Origins ===
In the 1901 Victorian census, three Thais were recorded. In the 1920s, King Vajiravudh sent Butra Mahintra to Australia to purchase racehorses. In 1927, the Prince of Kamphaengphet, Purachatra Jayakara led a group of Thai royals to Brisbane to tour Australian agriculture, meeting with the Governor of Queensland, John Goodwin.

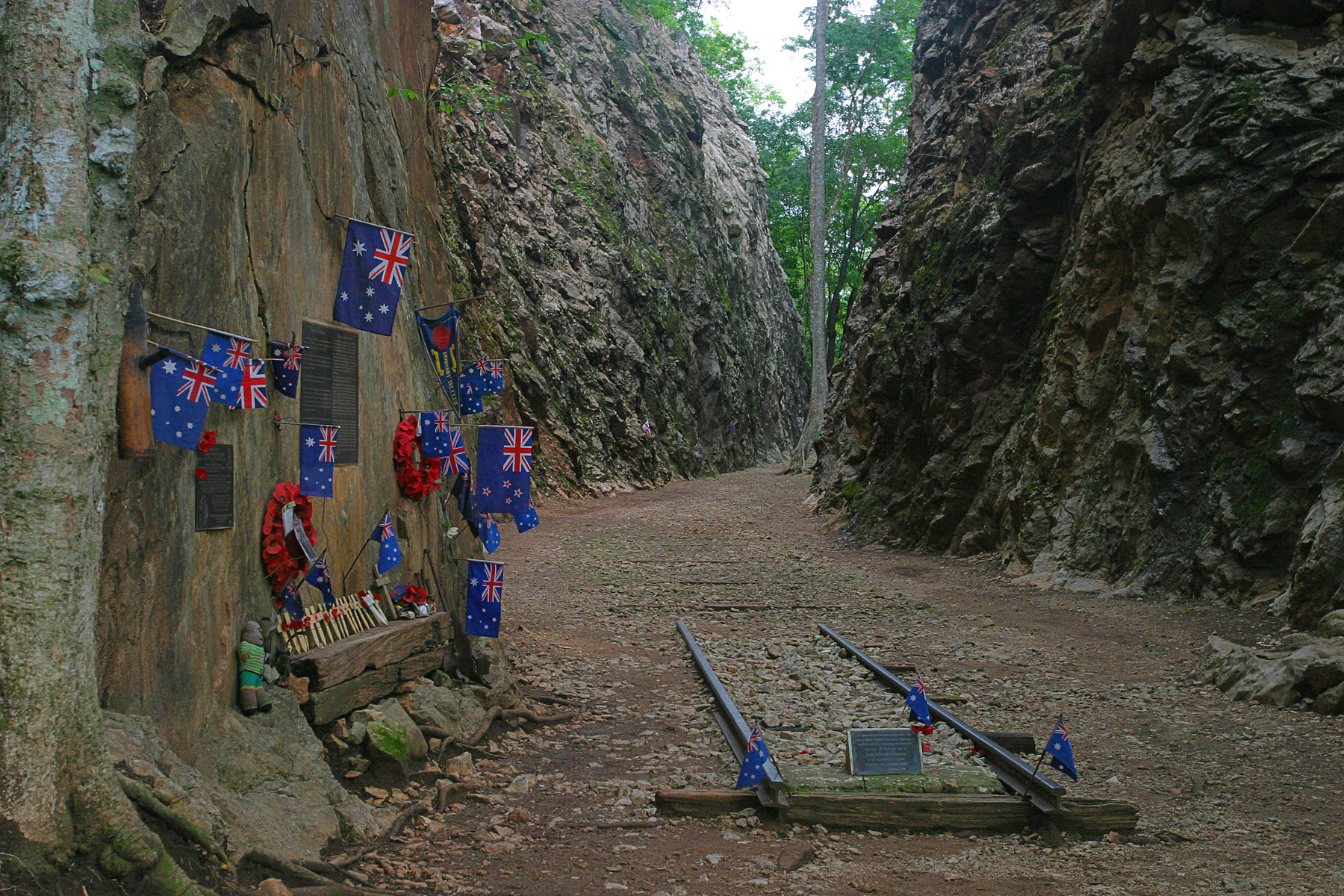
Australian and New Zealand flags at the Hellfire Pass in 2004

In November 1940, a Thai goodwill mission led by justice minister Thawan Thamrongnawasawat visited New South Wales, Victoria and Queensland. They were welcomed by Australian external affairs minister Frederick Stewart and received by governor-general Lord Gowrie. Stewart stated that it was "pleasing to be able to meet representatives of a neighbouring country without the intrusion of trade considerations", and hoped that "the result of the visit of the Thailand mission will be that both Australia and Thailand will greatly increase their imports and exports of goodwill, in addition to their normal trade relationships".

=== World War II ===
Following the attack on Pearl Harbor, and the Japanese invasion of Thailand on 7 and 8 December 1941 respectively, Australia and Thailand found themselves on opposing sides in World War II. After the Thai declaration of war on Britain, Australia declared war on Thailand on 2 March via Swiss diplomats.

In order to further their invasion into Burma, the Japanese started construction of the Burma railway from Bangkok to Thanbyuzayat. From October 1942 to October 1943, 13,000 Australian POWs captured from Singapore and the East Indies were transported to help construct the railway alongside Allied POWs and civilians, as well as Asian labourers. Construction of the railway resulted in the death of 2,815 POWs. A particular section of the railway was the Hellfire pass in Thailand, where POWs and civilians were forced to cut through a mountain pass. In the 1980s, the cutting was reclaimed from the jungle by ex-Australian POWs. Currently, the Hellfire Pass Interpretive Centre is handled by the Australian Department of Veteran's Affairs.

In the post-war period, 111 Japanese and Koreans who forced the construction of the railway, were convicted of war crimes, resulting in 32 of them being executed. Australia also signed a peace treaty with Thailand on 3 April 1946, becoming one of the first acts of Australian independence from Britain in its foreign affairs after the Statute of Westminster came into effect in 1942.

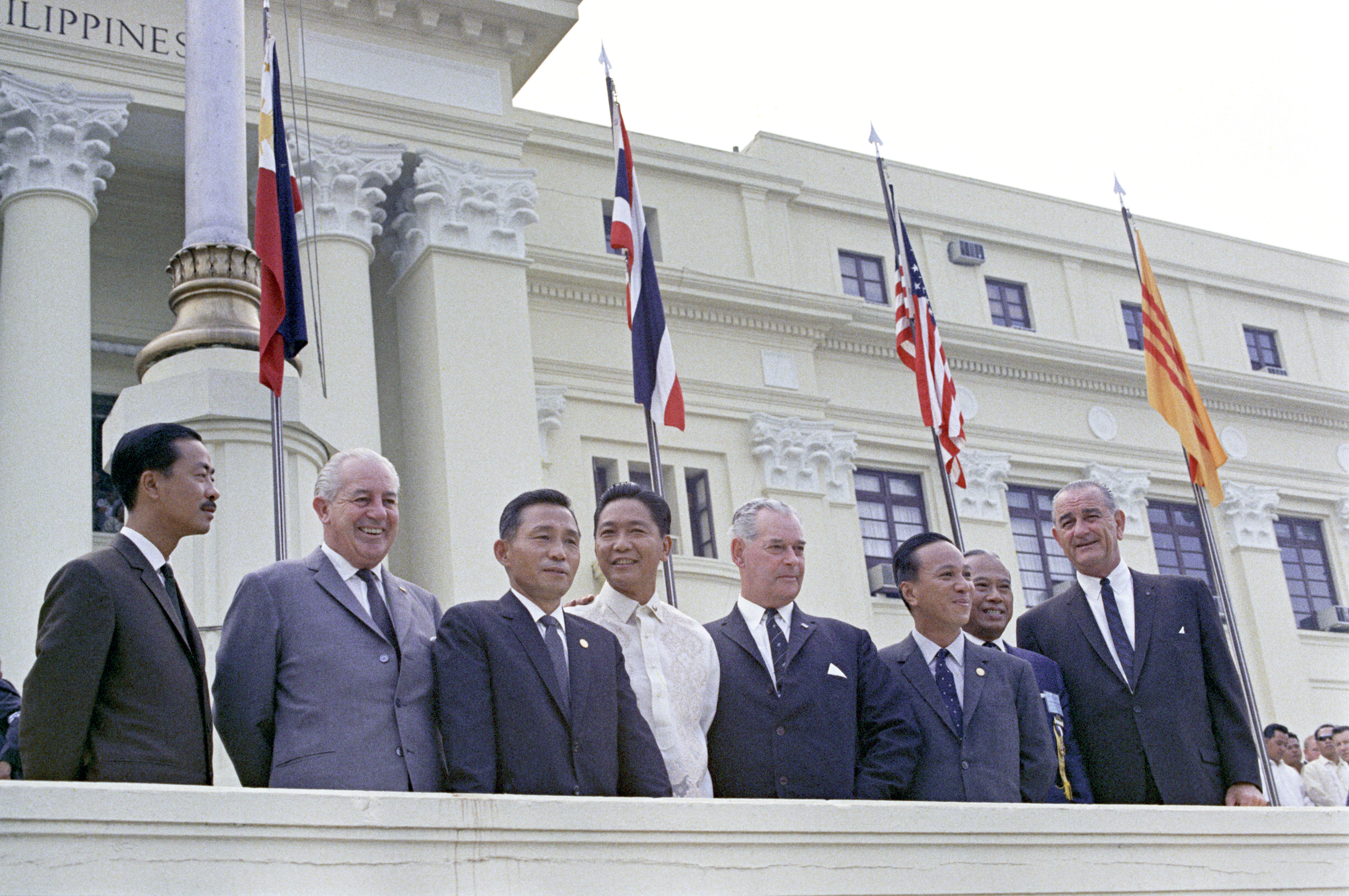
Australian PM Harold Holt and Thai PM Thanom Kittikachorn at the Manila Summit Conference in the Philippines

=== Cold War ===
During the Cold War, both Australia and Thailand aligned themselves with the United States against Communism. Formal relations between Australia and Thailand were established on 19 December 1952. When the Southeast Asia Treaty Organization (SEATO) was formed on 8 September 1954 in Manila, both Thailand and Australia were founding members. From 1962 to 1968, to support their fellow SEATO member, Australia deployed F-86 Sabre aircraft to Ubon Ratchathani province when the area came under a Communist insurgency. During the Vietnam War, both Australia and Thailand fought against the North Vietnamese.

During the 1960s and 1970s, both Thai and Khmer artifacts were smuggled through Thailand and sold to buyers in the United States and Australia. The main importer of Thai and Khmer artifacts into Australia was by the David Jones Art Gallery, who subsequently sold them to museums in Australia.

As part of the Colombo Plan, Australia attracted students from Thailand to study in Australia. From 1970 to 1976, Crown Prince Vajiralongkorn studied in Australian at Parramatta's King's School, and Duntroon's Royal Military College. According to The Sydney Morning Herald, the Australian government was particularly concerned about Vajiralongkorn's safety from assassinations. From 2018 to 2021, the Australian embassy in Bangkok would go on to produce a documentary around Vajiralongkorn time in Australia, with the 18-minute film being screened to King Vajiralongkorn on 15 February 2021, and then on Thai television.

Both Thailand and Australia were founding members of the Asia-Pacific Economic Cooperation (APEC) formed in 1989.

=== Modern era ===
During the Indonesian occupation of East Timor, Thailand supported Australian efforts in the region by contributing the second most soldiers to the Australian-led International Force East Timor.

During the 2006 Thai coup d'état, Australian Foreign Minister Alexander Downer said, "it's of grave concern to us that the government has been overthrown in this way".

In 2005, both signed the Thailand–Australia Free Trade Agreement, the ASEAN–Australia–New Zealand Free Trade Agreement in 2010, and the Australia–Thailand Strategic Partnership on 13 November 2020.

In 2023, Murray Upton returned nine Buddha statues to Thailand which were obtained by his father from Trang province in 1911.

Currently, both Thailand and Australia are major non-NATO allies of the United States.

On 28 February 2025, Australia criticized Thailand's deportation of 40 Uyghurs to China, with Foreign Minister Penny Wong expressing strong disagreement and raising concerns with Chinese authorities. Rights groups and the UN condemned the secretive deportation, warning of risks of torture and ill-treatment. Thailand had detained the Uyghurs since 2014 after they fled China. Beijing denied allegations of human rights abuses. Australia, which has a Uyghur community, has repeatedly voiced concerns over China's treatment of Muslim minorities in Xinjiang and urged Thailand to reconsider such actions.

Monthly short term travel departures from Australia to Thailand since 1991

== Trade ==
Monthly value of Australian merchandise exports to Thailand (A$ millions) since 1988

Monthly value of Thai merchandise exports to Australia (A$ millions) since 1988

In 2003, the two countries announced they would enter into a free trade agreement. The Thailand-Australia Free Trade Agreement (TAFTA) entered into force on 1 January 2005. TAFTA has facilitated increased two-way trade and investment, improved business mobility, encouraged international best practice, and promoted bilateral cooperation in a range of areas including customs procedures, government procurement, competition policy and intellectual property protection.

As of 2015, the two-way trade in goods and services was worth more than A$20.8 billion.

=== Mineral exports ===
Thailand is an important market for Australian aluminium and metal. Australia is also a significant supplier of coal to Thailand.

== Tourism ==
Thailand is a significant tourist market for Australians with 400,000 Australians visiting Thailand each year. The Australia-Thailand aviation market is Australia's 6th largest.

Australian passport holders can stay in Thailand for 30-days without applying for a visa.

As of 24 June 2025, Smartraveller, which provides international travel advice by the Australian government for Australians travelling overseas, lists Thailand overall as 'exercise a high degree of caution', whilst the southern provinces of Pattani, Yala, and Narathiwat are labelled as 'reconsider your need to travel' due to the insurgency.

=== Flights between Australia and Thailand ===
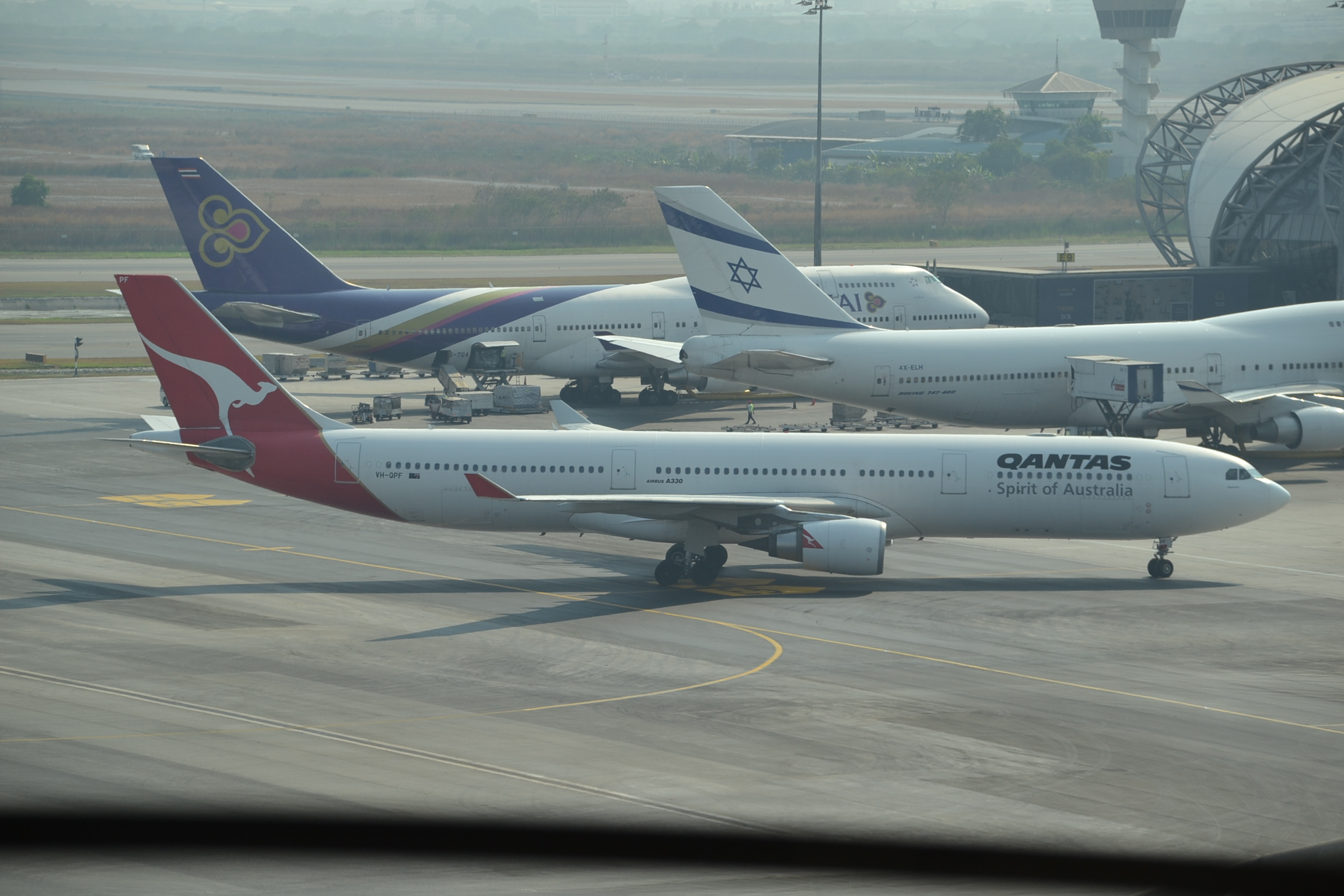
Qantas and Thai Airways at Suvarnabhumi airport, 2014

Several direct flights between Australia and Thailand exists:

Airline	Australian Airport	Thai Airport	Notes	Refs
AirAsia	Brisbane Airport	Don Mueang International Airport Suvarnabhumi Airport		
Jetstar	Sydney	Phuket International Airport		
Jetstar	Melbourne Airport	Phuket International Airport		
Jetstar	Melbourne Airport	Suvarnabhumi Airport		
Qantas	Adelaide Airport	Suvarnabhumi Airport		
Qantas	Brisbane Airport	Phuket Airport		
Qantas	Brisbane Airport	Suvarnabhumi Airport		
Qantas	Melbourne Airport	Suvarnabhumi Airport		
Qantas	Melbourne Airport	Koh Samui Airport		
Qantas	Melbourne Airport	Phuket Airport		
Qantas	Sydney Airport	Phuket Airport		
Qantas	Sydney Airport	Koh Samui Airport		
Qantas	Sydney Airport	Suvarnabhumi Airport		
Thai Airways	Melbourne Airport	Suvarnabhumi Airport		
Thai Airways	Perth Airport	Suvarnabhumi Airport	Coming soon	
Thai Airways	Sydney Airport	Suvarnabhumi Airport		

== State and official visits ==
State and official visits to Australia by a Thai royal and Thai Prime-minister
Dates	People	Locations	Itinerary
August 26-September 12, 1962	King Bhumibol Adulyadej and Queen Sirkit	Canberra, Port Kembla, Sydney, Brisbane, Melbourne, Hobart, Adelaide, Perth, Woomera	In Canberra, they visited several military sites and then toured Sydney harbour. Attended a garden party in Brisbane where they met Thai students as well as those in Melbourne. First visit by a non-British royal.
May 26–29, 2012	Prime-minister Yingluck Shinawatra	Canberra, Sydney	Made a visit to Canberra and Sydney on the 60th anniversary of relations. At the Shangri-La Hotel in Sydney, she encouraged investment in Thailand.

State and official visits to Thailand by an Australian Prime-minister
Dates	People	Locations	Itinerary
April 20–23, 1957	Robert Menzies	Bangkok	Arrived in Bangkok to talk about Australia's ties with SEATO.
November 3–4, 2019	Scott Morrison	Bangkok	Arrived in Bangkok to attend the 14th East Asia Summit, where he also met with Prayut Chan-o-cha.
November 17–19, 2022	Anthony Albanese	Bangkok	Arrived in Bangkok to attend the 29th APEC summit.

== Diplomacy ==
Of Australia

- Bangkok (Embassy)
- Chiang Mai (Consulate)
- Phuket (Consulate General)
- Koh Samui (Honorary Consulate)

Of Thailand

- Canberra (Embassy)
- Sydney (Consulate General)
- Melbourne (Consulate General)
- Perth (Consulate General)
- Brisbane (Consulate General)

== Wildlife ==
On 5 November 2006, several Asian Elephants arrived from Thailand to Melbourne zoo. The group consisted of three females called Kulab, Dokkoon, and Num-Oi. Kulab gave birth to a male in 2010 called Ongard, who is now part of a breeding program in the United States; Dokkoon gave birth to a female also on 16 January 2010 called Mali; while Num-Oi gave birth in 2023 to Kati. Luk Chai is a male descended from elephants from Thailand born at Taronga zoo on 4 July 2009 who was moved to Melbourne for breeding and has since fathered three calves.

== See also ==
- Australians in Thailand
- Thai Australian
- Foreign relations of Thailand
- Foreign relations of Australia

== Sources ==
- Thīrawit, Khīan [Khien Theeravit] (1979). Australian–Thai Relations: A Thai Perspective. Occasional Paper No. 58. Singapore: Institute of Southeast Asian Studies. OCLC 22409046.
- Battersby, Paul (2000). "An Uneasy Peace: Britain, the United States and Australia's Pursuit of War Reparations from Thailand, 1945–1952". Australian Journal of International Affairs. 54 (1): 15–31. doi:10.1080/00049910050007014. ISSN 1035-7718. S2CID 153688878.
