= Thai Australians =

Thai Australians ชาวออสเตรเลียเชื้อสายไทย

Total population
- 115,000 (2021)

Regions with significant populations
- Sydney, Melbourne, Perth, Brisbane, Adelaide

Languages
- Australian English, Thai

Religion
- Theravada Buddhism, Christianity

Related ethnic groups
- Thai people, Siamese, Isan people, Thai Chinese, Thai Malays, Indian Thais, Australian diaspora, Thai diaspora, Thai ethnic groups, Tai peoples, Shan people, Dai people, Zhuang people, Lao people, Asian Australians, Chinese Australians, Indian Australians, Malaysian Australians, Cocos Malays

Thai Australians refers to Australians who trace their ancestry to Thailand or Thais who trace their ancestry to Australia. The Australian census recorded 45,635 Australians with Thai ancestry in the 2011 census.

== History of immigration from Thailand ==
In 1911, the master of the Thai royal stables visited Australia and bought 126 horses. This started a trend of royal envoys from Thailand visiting Australia on horse-buying and other economic missions.

Melbourne's Museum Victoria (2013) reveals that the first notable Thai to arrive in Australia was Butra Mahintra, sent by King Rama VI during the early 1920s to purchase racehorses. Connections with Thai royalty developed further with the arrival of Prince Purachatra in 1927, leading a group to observe Australian agriculture and infrastructure

The number of Thais officially counted in New South Wales stayed under 50 until the 1950s. In January 1950, the Australian government launched the Colombo Plan, an aid program for sponsoring Asian students to study or train in Australian tertiary institutions. The main objectives of the plan were to dispel the negative impression of Asian countries toward the White Australia Policy and to counter communism in Asia. Students from developing countries were brought to Australia to study. The idea was that when they had finished their studies students would return to use the skills and knowledge they had acquired to help their own people. Approximately 450 Thai students travelled to Australia on the Colombo Plan between 1954 and 1989. Most did not settle in Australia permanently, but they increased awareness of Australia when they returned to Thailand. Between the 1950s and 1970s the majority of new arrivals from Thailand in Australia continued to be students, as well as spouses of Australians and those sponsored under military traineeships.

The number of migrants in Australia grew significantly when the Immigration Restriction Act was repealed in 1973. In 1975, Australia accepted many Vietnamese, Lao and Cambodian refugees for settlement. Included in this group of Indochinese refugees were non-Thais born inside Thailand. By 1986, the Thailand-born population in Australia had risen to 6,998 people, but only half of these were of Thai ancestry. This means that the Thai-born population of Thai ancestry in Australia at that time was less than one-twelfth of today's figure.

The latest Census in 2011 recorded 45,465 Thailand-born people in Australia, an increase of 48.8 per cent from the 2006 Census. The 2011 distribution by state and territory showed New South Wales had the largest number with 17,541, followed by Victoria (10,766), Queensland (7,022) and Western Australia (5,662). Among the total Thailand-born in Australia at the 2011 Census, 23.1 per cent arrived between 2001 and 2006 and 32.8 per cent arrived between 2006 and 2011.

== Thailand-Born Resident Population in Australia ==
People born in Thailand as a percentage of the population in Sydney divided geographically by postal area, as of the 2011 census

=== Estimated Thailand-Born Resident Population, by State, 1996–2016 ===
Region	1996	%	2001	%	2006	%	2011	%	2016	%
Australia	19,890	100%	24,430	100%	34,060	100%	52,990	100%	71,250	100%
New South Wales	7,890	40%	10,170	42%	13,710	40%	20,530	39%	28,740	40%
Victoria	4,600	23%	5,580	23%	7,810	23%	12,450	23%	17,210	24%
Queensland	2,360	12%	3,080	13%	4,980	15%	8,140	15%	10,780	15%
South Australia	1,150	6%	1,350	6%	1,880	6%	2,510	5%	2,990	4%
Western Australia	2,540	13%	2,710	11%	3,850	11%	6,710	13%	8,360	12%
Tasmania	290	1%	280	1%	350	1%	560	1%	650	1%
Northern Territory	410	2%	520	2%	600	2%	900	2%	1,110	2%
ACT	650	3%	750	3%	890	3%	1,190	2%	1,390	2%

=== Estimated Thailand-Born Resident Population, 1992 to 2014 ===
Year	Population	Change	% Change
1992	15,240	–	
1993	15,800	560	4%
1994	16,850	1,050	7%
1995	18,340	1,490	9%
1996	19,890	1,550	8%
1997	20,550	660	3%
1998	21,250	700	3%
1999	22,120	870	4%
2000	23,040	920	4%
2001	24,440	1,400	6%
2002	26,390	1,950	8%
2003	28,250	1,860	7%
2004	29,700	1,450	5%
2005	31,540	1,840	6%
2006	34,060	2,520	8%
2007	38,310	4,250	12%
2008	43,200	4,890	13%
2009	48,480	5,280	12%
2010	51,570	3,090	6%
2011	52,990	1,420	3%
2012	55,200	2,210	4%
2013	58,330	3,130	6%
2014	61,910	3,580	6%

== Notable Thai Australians ==
- Danial Williams, Professional MMA, Kickboxing & Muay Thai Fighter
- Geoff Huegill, swimmer
- Anchilee Scott-Kemmis, Miss Universe Thailand 2021
- Mechai Viravaidya, politician and activist
- Chai Romruen, actor
- Marion Grasby, TV presenter, cookbook author and food journalist
- Sudjai Cook, Australian rules footballer
- Adam Aitken, Australian poet
- Gemma Pranita, actress
- Jackie Barnes, musician
- Mahalia Barnes, singer-songwriter
- Paula Taylor, model, actress, TV host, and former Channel V VJ
- Kevin Lerdwichagul, YouTuber, producer, writer, voice actor, founder and CEO of Glitch Productions
- Luke Lerdwichagul, YouTuber, animator, director, producer, writer, editor, and voice actor, founder and CCO of Glitch Productions
- Nat Thaipun, chef, winner of MasterChef Australia 2024
- Tom Tate, businessman and Mayor of the Gold Coast

== See also ==
- Australia–Thailand relations
- Australians in Thailand
- Thai Town, Sydney
- Thai people
- Asian Australians
- Siam
- Thailand
- Immigration to Australia
