= Bake Off: The Professionals =

British television baking competition

- Also known as: Bake Off: Crème de la Crème
- Genre: Cookery; Reality
- Directed by: Jeanette Goulbourn; Nicholas Berry
- Presented by: Liam Charles; Ellie Taylor
- Judges: Benoit Blin; Cherish Finden
- Theme music composer: Tom Howe
- Country of origin: United Kingdom
- Original language: English
- No. of series: 11
- No. of episodes: 107

Production
- Executive producers: Anna Beattie; Richard Bowron; Richard McKerrow
- Producers: Kate Baller, Laura Smith
- Production locations: Welbeck Abbey, Nottinghamshire, UK (2016); Firle Place, East Sussex, UK (2017–present)
- Running time: 60 minutes
- Production company: Love Productions

Original release
- Network: BBC Two
- Release: 29 March 2016 – 31 May 2017
- Network: Channel 4
- Release: 6 May 2018 – present

Related
- The Great British Bake Off

Bake Off: The Professionals is a British television baking competition featuring teams of professional pastry chefs pitted against one another over two challenges. The series is a spin-off from The Great British Bake Off, and was originally titled Bake Off: Crème de la Crème on the BBC. Its first episode was screened on BBC Two on 29 March 2016. The third series screened on Channel 4 and was renamed Bake Off: The Professionals to join The Great British Bake Off after the BBC failed to renew the series.

The eight-episode first series of the programme was presented by Tom Kerridge, with Benoit Blin, Cherish Finden and Claire Clark serving as judges. The second series was presented by Angus Deayton, and Claire Clark did not return as a judge. On Channel 4, the series was originally presented by comedian Tom Allen and former GBBO competitor Liam Charles. In 2022 Tom Allen was replaced by Stacey Solomon, and from 2023 it has been presented by Charles and comedian Ellie Taylor.

The first series was won by the Squires Kitchen Cookery School team led by Mark Tilling, followed by a team of military chefs led by Liam Grime, a team from London Hilton Park Lane with Emmanuel Bonneau, Thibault Marchand and Erica Sangiorgi from Kimpton Fitzroy London Hotel, and Laurian Veaudor and Thibault Courtoisier from Cocorico Patisserie. Andrew Minto and Michael Coggan from Gin and Bake in Cardiff won in 2021.

== Format ==
The series is a competition between teams of professional pastry chefs from high-end hotels and restaurants, as well as supermarkets, armed forces and other companies and organisations. The competition aims to find the finest pastry chefs in the country, who can turn the ordinary into the extraordinary and can create desserts that have "stunning visual impact, phenomenal flavour, and texture". Teams of pastry chefs are chosen for the competition, with three pastry chefs in each team in the first two series, one of them the team captain. From the third series onwards, teams of two competed. In the heats, the three teams are given two challenges and are awarded marks from the judges for each of their creations, the team with the best total score after both challenges is guaranteed a place in the semifinal. The team with the highest total score throughout the whole of the heats is also guaranteed a place within the semifinal. Each episode consists of two challenges:

Miniature Challenge
In this challenge each team have to create a batch of three types of miniatures. Each must be uniform in appearance, finished to the very highest professional standards and will only have three hours to make all 108 pastries. Each miniature is marked out of 30 with a total of 90 points available. Other challenges may replace the miniature challenge. For example, there may be a secret recipe challenge for one of the heat rounds where the contestants are not given information beforehand on the bakes they have to do, and only given a recipe on the day before they start baking.
Showpiece Challenge
In this challenge each team are asked to reinvent a popular British dessert and present it as a fine-dining showpiece display. Each judge has 50 points they can award with a total of 150 points available.

The format changed from the first series to the third. The first series started with 15 teams, three teams in each of the five heats, with the winning team each episode guaranteed a place in the semifinals, with one additional wild card from the heats. Three teams were selected from the two semifinals to compete in the final. The second series started with ten teams separated into two groups of five, with one team eliminated each episode over two sets of three heats before the semifinal. The two winners from the two semifinal then compete in the final. From the third series onward, the competition started with twelve teams, in two groups of six, again with one team eliminated in three sets of heats. The remaining six teams, three from each group, then competed for a place in the quarterfinal, followed by the semifinal, leaving three teams in the final.

== Series overview ==
Series	Episodes	Premiere	Final	Winning team	Runners-up	Channel
1	8	29 March 2016	17 May 2016	Squires Kitchen Cookery School	London Hilton Park Lane	BBC Two
1	8	29 March 2016	17 May 2016	Squires Kitchen Cookery School	Boulangerie Jade	BBC Two
2	9	4 April 2017	31 May 2017	Military Chefs	Cocorico Patisserie	BBC Two
3	10	6 May 2018	8 July 2018	London Hilton Park Lane	Sweet Art Lab	Channel 4
3	10	6 May 2018	8 July 2018	London Hilton Park Lane	Resorts World Birmingham	Channel 4
4	10	30 April 2019	14 June 2019	Kimpton Fitzroy London Hotel	Pennyhill Park Hotel	Channel 4
4	10	30 April 2019	14 June 2019	Kimpton Fitzroy London Hotel	South Place Hotel	Channel 4
5	10	26 May 2020	28 July 2020	Cocorico Patisserie	Park Plaza Westminster Bridge	Channel 4
5	10	26 May 2020	28 July 2020	Cocorico Patisserie	The Ivy	Channel 4
6	10	25 May 2021	27 July 2021	Gin & Bake	Julien Plumart	Channel 4
6	10	25 May 2021	27 July 2021	Gin & Bake	The Lanesborough	Channel 4
7	10	24 May 2022	26 July 2022	Nathan Rave and Kevin Marmion	Hotel Café Royal	Channel 4
7	10	24 May 2022	26 July 2022	Nathan Rave and Kevin Marmion	Puddles Bespoke Patisserie	Channel 4
8	10	4 July 2023	5 September 2023	The Landmark Hotel	Harwoods Patisserie	Channel 4
8	10	4 July 2023	5 September 2023	The Landmark Hotel	The Dorchester	Channel 4
9	10	10 June 2024	8 July 2024	InterContinental London – The O2	The Royal Air Force Club	Channel 4
9	10	10 June 2024	8 July 2024	InterContinental London – The O2	Soko Patisserie	Channel 4
10	10	27 May 2025	29 July 2025	The Ned	Vacherin	Channel 4
10	10	27 May 2025	29 July 2025	The Ned	Hyatt Regency London – The Churchill	Channel 4
11	10	26 May 2026	22 July 2026	Edwardian Hotels		Channel 4
11	10	26 May 2026	22 July 2026	Edwardian Hotels	The Stafford London	Channel 4

=== Series 1 ===
The first series of the competition was filmed at Welbeck Abbey in Nottinghamshire, It was presented by Tom Kerridge, and the competition was judged by Benoit Blin, Cherish Finden and Claire Clark.

There were fifteen teams of pastry chefs in the first round. The team from Marks & Spencer, British Armed Forces, London's Boulangerie Jade, London Hilton on Park Lane, and Leed's Lauden Chocolate winning their respective heats to reach the semifinal, while Squires Kitchen Cookery School from Surrey also went through as the best scoring runners-up. The Squires Kitchen and Hilton teams won their semifinals, with Boulangerie Jade chosen for the third spot in the final. The competition was won by the team from Squires Kitchen led by Mark Tilling with his former pupils Helen Vass and Samantha Rain.

=== Series 2 ===
The second series was filmed at Firle Place, East Sussex. It was presented by Angus Deayton, with Blin and Finden as the two returning judges.

Ten teams competed in this series, some of whom also competed in the first series. Two teams competed in the final, which was between a returning team, the Military Chefs, and a team from Cocorico Patisserie of Cardiff. The competition was won by the Military Chefs with Liam Grime the team captain and two other RAF chefs, Ian Mark and Chris Morrell.

=== Series 3 ===
The third series was moved to Channel 4 and retitled Bake Off: The Professionals, with Tom Allen and Liam Charles taking over as presenters. It was again filmed at Firle Place, East Sussex, and Blin and Finden returned as judges. Twelve teams, with only two pastry chefs in a team, competed in this series. The final was between three pairs: Emmanuel Bonneau and returning contestant Sam Leatherby from London Hilton on Park Lane, Darryl Collins and Bharat Chandegra from Resorts World in Birmingham and Hideko Kawa and Theo Beauchet, representing Sweet Art Lab in London. The competition was won by Emmanuel and Sam from London Hilton on Park Lane.

=== Series 4 ===
The fourth series was filmed at Firle Place, East Sussex The same presenters and judges returned for series 4, and again with 12 pairs of pastry chefs competing using the same format as series 3. The competition was won by Thibault Marchand and Erica Sangiorgi from Kimpton Fitzroy London Hotel, beating teams from Pennyhill Park Hotel and South Place Hotel.

=== Series 5 ===
Bake Off: The Professionals returned for a fifth series on 25 May 2020 with 12 teams of pastry chefs. The competition for 2020 was won by Laurian Veaudor and Thibault Courtoisier from Cocorico Patisserie, in Cardiff, beating Domenico and Alessandra from Park Plaza Westminster Bridge and Clanny and Ryan from The Ivy.

=== Series 6 ===
The show returned on 25 May 2021 with 12 teams of pastry chefs with the same presenters and judges. Cardiff produced a second consecutive win as Michael Coggan and Andrew Minto from Gin & Bake took the silver platter, beating Julien Plumart from Brighton and The Lanesborough from London.

=== Series 7 ===
The seventh series premiered on 24 May 2022 with 12 pairs of pastry chefs, the same judges and Stacey Solomon replacing Tom Allen. The competition was won by London-based French pastry chefs Nathan Rave and Kevin Marmion, with I Shan and Jojo from Hotel Café Royal and Jemima and Zack from Puddles Bespoke Patisserie taking second place.

=== Series 8 ===
The eighth series premiered on 4 July 2023 with 11 pairs of pastry chefs. Ellie Taylor replaced Stacey Solomon as new co-host. The competition was won by the London-based Landmark team: Italian pastry chef Mauro Di Lieto and his teammate Daniel Schevenels from Belgium.

=== Series 9 ===
The ninth series premiered on 10 June 2024 with 12 pairs of pastry chefs with the same presenters and judges. The competition was won by London-based Tanuj and Narayan from the InterContinental London – The O2. Gerol and Michael from The Royal Air Force Club and Bharat and John from Soko Patisserie were runners-up.

=== Series 10 ===
The tenth series premiered on 27 May 2025 with 12 pairs of pastry chefs with the same presenters and judges. The competition was won by London-based Darian and Yadira from The Ned. Ericsson and Jamie from the catering company Vacherin and Saskia and Ashik from the Hyatt Regency London – The Churchill were runners-up.

=== Series 11 ===
The eleventh series premiered on 26 May 2026 with 12 pairs of pastry chefs with the same presenters and judges. The competition was won by Ashish and Loki from Edwardian Hotels. Aubin and Avneet from The Stafford London and Valentina and Aurora were second and third place, respectively.

== Reception ==
Early reviews were largely negative, with many reviewers comparing it unfavourably to The Great British Bake Off, suggesting that it had lost the crucial elements that made the original Bake Off a success. Michael Hogan of The Daily Telegraph complained that the new show "bore no resemblance to it whatsoever, thus seemed to be merely piggybacking cynically on the Bake-Off "brand". He also found two of the judges' accents as well as the scoring system "impenetrable", the baking "bafflingly scientific" and the teams not "terribly likeable". He concluded that Creme de la Creme "was nice but dull", and that as "a Bake-Off spin-off, it was a soggy-bottomed disaster". Many of the viewing public concurred with the assessments of the critics and found the show lacking the "charm, fun and warmth" of the original. Chitra Ramaswamy of The Guardian thought that when the professional version of Bake Off becomes serious means that "it gets silly", and he "found the format convoluted, which telly like this should never be". Gabriel Tate of The Times found the show a to be a "bloodless, uninvolving affair at once frenetically busy and yawningly free of incident, full of astounding technical proficiency and jawdropping invention, but devoid of passion and identity".

The version on Channel 4 was given a lukewarm reception by the critics. Although Michael Hogan of The Daily Telegraph considered the new pairing of Allen and Charles an improvement as presenters, he found it "lacking the warmth, wit and charm" of its parent programme. Lucy Mangan of The Guardian thought that, unlike the original programme, the professional version failed to get viewers invested in the contestants, and that "watching professionals get it wrong" was "a cold, slightly embittering experience". James Jackson of The Times described it as a "format fluff" that is "like a smaller, colder moon orbiting the warm Jupiter giant that is the GBBO mother show".

== International versions ==
The French version Le Meilleur Patissier: Les Professionnels is broadcast on M6.

== Ratings ==
The ratings figures are from BARB.

=== Series 1 ===
Episode no.	Broadcast date	Viewers (millions)	BBC Two weekly ranking
1	29 March 2016	4.63	2
2	5 April 2016	4.09	2
3	12 April 2016	4.15	2
4	19 April 2016	3.81	2
5	26 April 2016	3.59	2
6	3 May 2016	3.59	1
7	10 May 2016	3.39	1
8	17 May 2016	3.68	1

=== Series 2 ===
Episode no.	Broadcast date	Viewers (millions)	BBC Two weekly ranking
1	4 April 2017	2.66	4
2	11 April 2017	2.85	3
3	18 April 2017	2.60	3
4	25 April 2017	2.66	1
5	2 May 2017	2.70	3
6	9 May 2017	2.49	3
7	16 May 2017	2.66	3
8	24 May 2017	2.22	6
9	31 May 2017	2.35	6

=== Series 3 ===
Viewing figures for Channel 4 are total numbers including +1.

Episode no.	Broadcast date	Viewers (millions)	Channel 4 weekly ranking
1	6 May 2018	2.21	4
2	13 May 2018	2.19	3
3	20 May 2018	2.29	2
4	27 May 2018	2.13	4
5	3 June 2018	1.52	7
6	10 June 2018	1.92	3
7	17 June 2018	1.84	4
8	24 June 2018	1.83	4
9	1 July 2018	1.59	5
10	8 July 2018	2.17	3

=== Series 4 ===
Viewing figures given since September 2018 are total figures from multiple-screen viewings that include other viewing platforms in addition to television, such as computers and smartphones.

Episode no.	Broadcast date	Viewers (millions)	Channel 4 weekly ranking
1	30 April 2019	2.38	2
2	7 May 2019	2.04	2
3	14 May 2019	1.83	4
4	21 May 2019	2.17	3
5	28 May 2019	1.71	4
6	4 June 2019	2.18	1
7	11 June 2019	2.09	3
8	12 June 2019	1.92	6
9	13 June 2019	1.94	7
10	14 June 2019	2.05	4

=== Series 5 ===
Episode no.	Broadcast date	Viewers (millions)	Channel 4 weekly ranking
1	26 May 2020	2.97	3
2	2 June 2020	2.84	3
3	9 June 2020	2.82	5
4	16 June 2020	2.49	2
5	23 June 2020	2.60	2
6	30 June 2020	2.91	2
7	7 July 2020	2.75	2
8	14 July 2020	2.81	2
9	21 July 2020	2.67	1
10	28 July 2020	2.86	1

=== Series 6 ===
Episode no.	Broadcast date	Viewers (millions)	Channel 4 weekly ranking
1	25 May 2021	3.02	1
2	1 June 2021	2.50	2
3	8 June 2021	2.20	2
4	15 June 2021	2.28	2
5	22 June 2021	1.88	6
6	29 June 2021	2.16	2
7	6 July 2021	1.92	3
8	13 July 2021	2.16	3
9	20 July 2021	2.28	2
10	27 July 2021	2.34	2

=== Series 7 ===
Ratings from this series onward are 7-day consolidated and exclude viewership on devices.

Episode no.	Broadcast date	Viewers (millions)	Channel 4 weekly ranking	Ref
1	24 May 2022	2.06	2	
2	31 May 2022	1.75	4	
3	6 June 2022	1.81	5	
4	13 June 2022	1.78	6	
5	21 June 2022	1.74	5	
6	28 June 2022	N/A	N/A	—
7	5 July 2022	N/A	N/A	—
8	12 July 2022	1.63	4	
9	19 July 2022	1.73	1	
10	26 July 2022	1.49	1	
