= Cherish Finden =

Singaporean pastry chef (born 1967)

- Born: 20 December 1967 (age 58); Singapore
- Children: 1
- Culinary career
- Cooking style: Pastry
- Current restaurant
- Langham Hotel
- Television shows
- MasterChef; Bake Off: The Professionals

Cherish Finden
- Simplified Chinese: 黄淑柔
- Traditional Chinese: 黃淑柔
Transcriptions
Standard Mandarin
- Hanyu Pinyin: Huáng Shūróu
Yue: Cantonese
- Yale Romanization: Wòhng Suhk Yàuh
- Jyutping: Wong⁴ Suk⁶ Jau⁴

Cherish Finden (born 20 December 1967) is a Singaporean-born pastry chef. Born in Singapore, she trained to become a pastry chef and after moving to the United Kingdom, has worked as an executive chef at various hotels and restaurants and has won a plethora of awards for her work. Since 2016, she has served as a judge on Bake Off: The Professionals.

== Life and career ==
=== Early life and culinary career ===
Finden was born on 20 December 1967 in Singapore. The youngest of her siblings, she began cooking for them when she was eight years old after her father became sick and her mother had to work. At the age of 14, she began working as a waitress and later asked if she could volunteer in the kitchen, thus inspiring her love of cuisine. When Finden was 16, she joined Shatec Institutes where she enrolled on a course in pastry making, and later began working as a chocolatier before becoming a pastry chef, at Raffles Hotel and Pan Pacific Singapore Hotel. In 2000, Finden led a team of pastry chefs to win the IKA Culinary Olympics. Finden is married to a financial director and they have a daughter together; they moved to London in 2001. Between 2009 and 2017, she worked as an executive pastry chef at the Langham Hotel, a role which has earned her numerous awards. During her first year, she won "Dessert of the Year" and in 2010, under Finden's leadership, The Langham's Palm Court won Tea Guild's "Top London Afternoon Tea" award. She was also awarded "Pastry Chef of the Year" by the Craft Guild of Chefs in 2012 and in 2015, Finden was awarded The Macallan Lifetime Achievement Award at the World Gourmet Summit. In 2018, Finden was appointed creative development chef at luxury chocolatier Godiva and the following year created the world's most expensive easter egg, made entirely of Belgian chocolate that cost £10,000. In 2020, Finden became the executive pastry chef at the Pan Pacific London, which opened in September 2021. Whilst there, she opened her own pâtisserie Shiok! which launched in May 2022. She left her role at Pan Pacific in April 2023. Cherish parted ways with the Pan Pacific Hotel London to concentrate on other ventures.

=== Television ===
In 2010, Finden appeared as a guest chef on MasterChef Australia and MasterChef: The Professionals. In 2016, Finden became a judge on the BBC baking competition Bake Off: Crème de la Crème, a spin-off of The Great British Bake Off. After two series on the BBC, the show moved to Channel 4 in 2018 and was renamed Bake Off: The Professionals, and Finden has remained with show since. In 2017, Finden appeared as a mentor on Celebrity MasterChef, during an episode in which she led a team of contestants who had to re-create her pastry dishes. In 2020, Finden appeared as a celebrity expert on an episode of the BBC game show The Wheel. She has also made appearances on Heston's Great British Food, Junior Bake Off, The Great British Bake Off: An Extra Slice and Saturday Kitchen.

== Filmography ==
As herself
Year	Title	Notes	Ref.
2010, 2026	MasterChef Australia	Guest chef	
2010	MasterChef: The Professionals	Guest chef	
2014	Heston's Great British Food	Guest	
2015–2017	The Great British Bake Off: An Extra Slice	Guest; 3 episodes	
2016–present	Bake Off: The Professionals	Judge	
2017	Celebrity MasterChef	Guest	
2020	The Wheel	Celebrity expert	
2026	The Great Stand Up to Cancer Bake Off	Guest judge	
