= Andy Hearnden =

New Zealand celebrity chef (born 1985)

- Born: 7 October 1985 (age 41)
- Partner: Katelyn Flood

YouTube information
- Channel: Andy Cooks
- Subscribers: 6.18M
- Last updated: 30 April 2026
- Website: www.andy-cooks.com

Andrew Hearnden (born 7 October 1985), better known by his online moniker Andy Cooks, is a New Zealand chef and YouTuber. Based in Australia, he worked in restaurants for 20 years before turning to social media in the wake of the COVID-19 pandemic, and two years later had 13 million followers across TikTok, Instagram, YouTube, and Facebook.

== Early life ==
Hearnden was born in Wellington and subsequently lived on a poultry farm. He was passionate about cooking from a very young age.

== Career ==
=== Chef ===
After training at an Auckland culinary school, Hearnden worked in café kitchens there.

Moving to London he started working for Michelin-star chef Tom Aikens at Chelsea's Tom's Kitchen, then at E&O in Notting Hill, before Shoreditch's Great Eastern Dining Room to be their head chef at the age of 24.

After seven years in England, Hearnden moved to Sydney and French Bistro Felix. He became head chef at Gills Diner and then Entrecôte in Melbourne.

Hearnden was executive chef at coffee shop chain St Ali and later managed restaurants and bars in airports around Australia and New Zealand. He moved to the Sunshine Coast in 2020, joining beef processor Kilcoy Global Foods, as executive chef in their test kitchen.

=== Content creator ===
In November 2021, Hearnden started publishing on TikTok under the name Andy Cooks. Later, he posted Instagram, YouTube and Facebook content for home cooks. Within 18 months of starting, he had 10 million subscribers across his social media platforms.

His cooking videos are known for the Hey Babe format.

In 2022, YouTube identified Hearnden as one of Australia's Top 5 Creators. The Sydney Daily Telegraph described him as a top 25 Australian on TikTok, and The Australian ranked him Australia's #41 top influencer. Taste.com.au considered him one of its most popular food influencers of the year and The Courier-Mail one of the Sunshine Coast's top influencers.

In 2023 the Herald Sun named him one of Victoria's top Instagram influencers. The Courier-Mail ranked him in its list of the Sunshine Coast's most influential people, and also included him amongst Queensland's top YouTube and Instagram creators. YouTube Australia named Hearnden its top creator.

== Publications ==
- Hearnden, Andy (2023). Andy Cooks: The Cookbook. Marion's Press. ISBN 9780645255768.

== Personal life ==
Hearnden is in a relationship with Katelyn Flood.

== Television ==
		Role	Episodes
2023	The Cook Up with Adam Liaw on SBS Food	Guest	4
2023	Sunrise on Seven Network	Guest	2
2023	The Morning Show on Seven Network	Guest	1
2023	Breakfast on TVNZ 1	Guest	1
2025	MasterChef Australia	Guest	1
2026	MasterChef Australia	Guest	1
