= Royal Academy of Culinary Arts =

Non-profit private Jordanian associate university college

- الأكاديمية الملكية لفنون الطهي
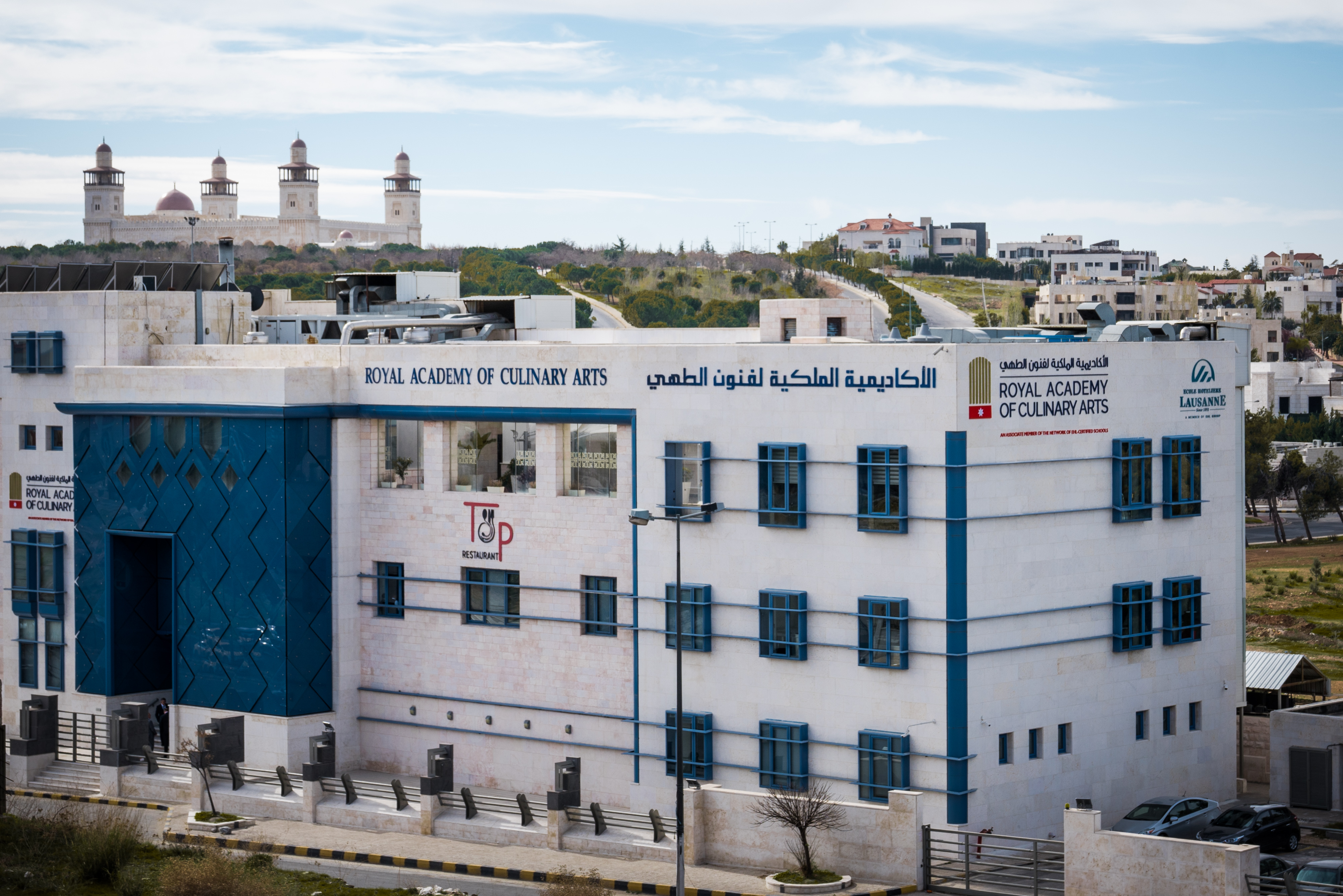
- Abbreviation: RACA
- Formation: 2008
- Headquarters: Amman
- Chairman: Dr. Wajih Owais
- Director: Mr. Jacques Rossel
- Affiliations: École hôtelière de Lausanne
- Website: https://raca.edu.jo/

Royal Academy of Culinary Arts (RACA) is a certified member of the network of EHL-Certified Schools is a non-profit private Jordanian institution, It was founded in 2008.

The Royal Academy of Culinary Arts opened as a Campus of Les Roches Global Hospitality Education, as the first culinary school managed and operated by them in the world. The Royal Academy of Culinary Arts (RACA) has entered into a partnership with Ecole Hôtelière de Lausanne, one of the oldest Hospitality Management schools in the world. The curriculum is entirely taught in English.
