= Marion Grasby =

Australian cook and food entrepreneur

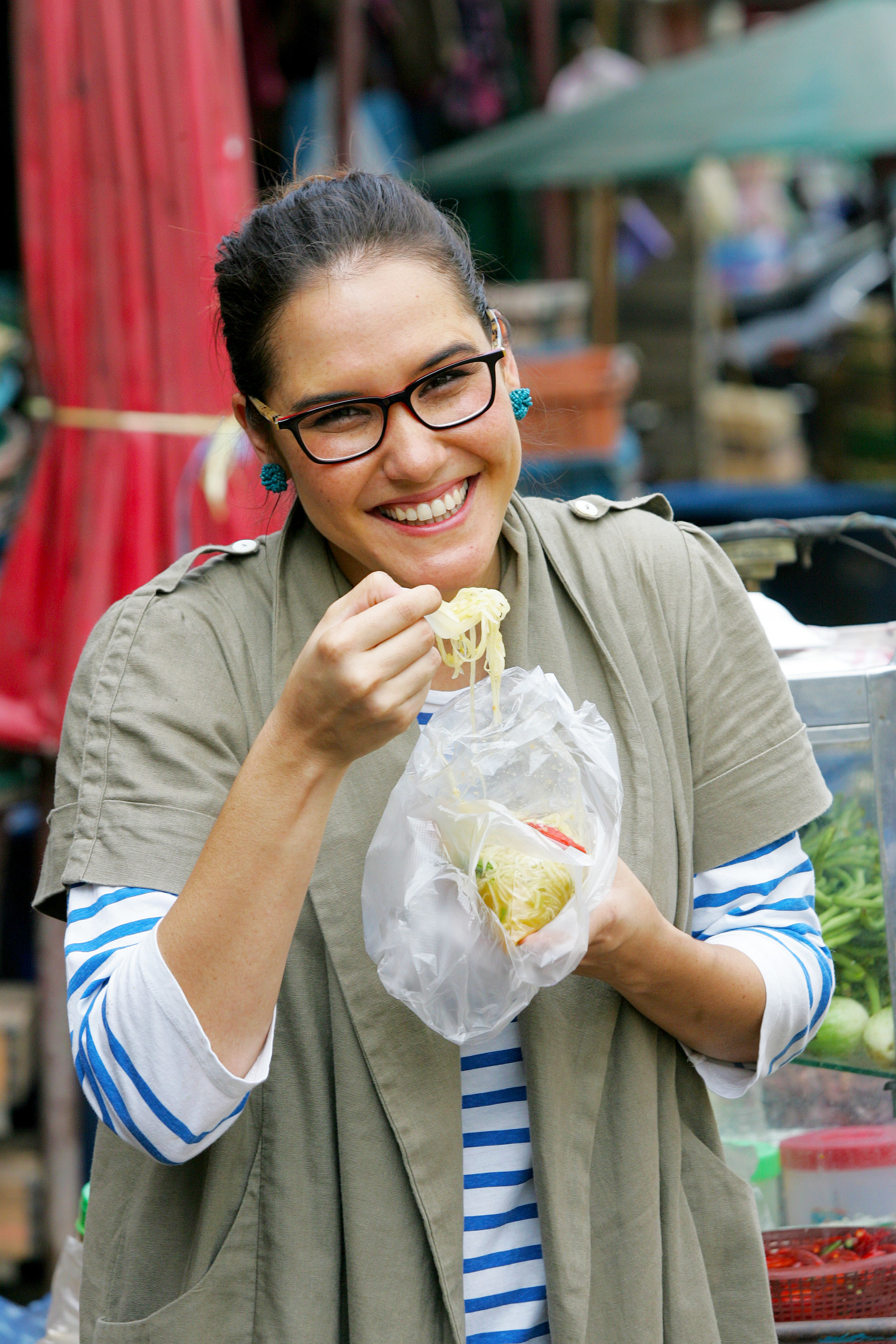
- Grasby in Thailand, January 2013
- Born: 29 September 1982 (age 44); Darwin, Northern Territory
- Education: Queensland University of Technology; University of Adelaide
- Years active: 2006–present
- Known for: Television cook and presenter, cookbook author, food journalist
- Television: MasterChef Australia, Season 2 (Network 10, 2010); MasterChef Australia All-Stars (Network 10, 2012); The Celebrity Apprentice Australia, Season 2 (Nine Network, 2012); Marion's Thailand (Lifestyle Food Channel, Foxtel, 2013); Wok vs Pot (SBS, 2020)
- Spouse: Tim Althaus
- Children: 2

Marion Grasby (born 29 September 1982) is an Australian cook and food entrepreneur. She is also a television presenter, cookbook author and food journalist. Marion married Tim Althaus in 2013 and the couple have two children. Althaus is CEO of Marion's Kitchen Group.

== Early life and education ==
Grasby was born in Darwin, Northern Territory. At the age of four she moved with her family to Papua New Guinea, where she attended primary school. She later moved to Brisbane where she boarded at Somerville House. Her heritage is Thai on her mother's side and Australian on her father's side.

Grasby was influenced by her mother Noi, a professionally trained Thai chef and credits her with inspiring her with a natural love of food.

After graduating from high school, Grasby studied law and journalism at the Queensland University of Technology, completing a Bachelor of Arts and Bachelor of Laws in 2005.

== Journalism career ==
After university, Grasby was employed by the Australian Broadcasting Corporation (ABC) in Adelaide, South Australia, as a journalist. Between 2006 and 2008, Grasby was a reporter with the ABC. She filed reports for a range of radio and online services, including The World Today AM, and ABC Rural. She also worked as a producer for Stateline.

== Culinary career ==
In 2008 Grasby left her journalism career and returned to university to study for a Master of Arts in Gastronomy at the University of Adelaide.

=== MasterChef Australia, Season 2 ===
In 2010 Grasby took a break from her Masters of Arts in Gastronomy course to compete in the second television series of MasterChef Australia. She was a favourite among viewers to win the series.

Grasby's highlights in the series include winning a celebrity chef challenge against Movida's Frank Camorra and being named by Heston Blumenthal as the best performer during a MasterChef challenge in the UK, which Grasby said was her proudest cooking achievement. Grasby was ultimately eliminated from the competition.

After leaving MasterChef, Grasby was offered opportunities to cook, write and present. She signed a deal with Masterchef Magazine.

=== Marion's Kitchen (food company) ===
In 2010, after finishing at MasterChef, Grasby started her own food company called Marion's Kitchen, which makes a range of meal kits including Pad Thai, San Choy Bow and Thai curries, as well as stir-fry sauces, marinades and salad dressings. In 2015 Marion’s Kitchen products launched in US supermarkets, before switching to a US direct-to-consumer subscription service in 2019 called Marion’s Kitchen All Access USA.

In early 2017 Marion’s Kitchen launched a studio in Bangkok, Thailand, to create food and lifestyle video content for the Marion’s Kitchen and Marion Grasby social media channels. In 2020 a second filming studio was set up in Noosa, Australia.

Since then Marion Grasby and Tim Althaus have launched several ventures, including CookDineHost.com, MAKO Performance Cookware, Marion’s Kitchen Media, Oriana Press, and Asoke Homewares.

=== Press and media ===
Grasby appeared on MasterChef All-Stars and Nine's Celebrity Apprentice in 2012.

In February 2013, Grasby was nominated as a campaign ambassador for American Express Australia's 'Realise Your Potential in 2013' competition to help inspire people to aim high and achieve their dreams.

Grasby is currently based in Noosa, Queensland, where she develops and films food and lifestyle content for her brand, Marion’s Kitchen.

== Books ==
- Grasby, Marion (2014). Asia express : 100 fast & easy favourites. Sydney, NSW. ISBN 978-1-74261-288-1. OCLC 878076444.
- Grasby, Marion (2011). Marion : recipes and stories from a hungry cook. Sydney: Macmillan. ISBN 978-1-4050-4051-8. OCLC 711962443.

== Television series ==
=== Marion’s Thailand ===
In 2013 Grasby's series Marion's Thailand debuted on Lifestyle Food for Foxtel. The 10-part series was shot on location in and around Marion's traditional family home in Thailand and highlighted authentic Thai meals.

=== Wok vs Pot ===
Wok vs Pot, a three-part series, aired on SBS Food in August 2020. Hailed as a “delightful new series reminiscent of that classic, The Cook and the Chef”. Each episode featured Grasby and chef Silvia Colloca cooking a dish in their own style – Grasby using a wok to cook an Asian-style dish, and Colloca using a pot for her traditional Italian dishes.
