= Henry Gage (disambiguation) =

Henry Gage (1852–1924) was an American politician, the 20th governor of California.

Henry Gage is also the name of:

- Henry Gage (soldier) (1597–1645), English
- Henry Gage, 3rd Viscount Gage (1761–1808), British soldier
- Henry Gage, 4th Viscount Gage (1791–1877), British politician
- Henry Gage, 5th Viscount Gage (1854–1912), British
- Henry Gage, 6th Viscount Gage (1895–1982), British politician
- Henry Gage (born 1934), a.k.a. Nicolas Gage, 8th Viscount Gage, British
