= Governor Gage =

Governor Gage may refer to:

- Henry Gage (1852–1924), 20th Governor of California
- Jack R. Gage (1899–1970), 25th Governor of Wyoming
- Thomas Gage (1719–1787), Military Governor of Quebec from 1760 to 1763 and Governor of Massachusetts Bay from 1774 to 1775
- Thomas Gage, 1st Viscount Gage (1700s–1754), rumoured appointee as Governor of Barbados in 1839
