= William Gage, 2nd Viscount Gage =

British politician

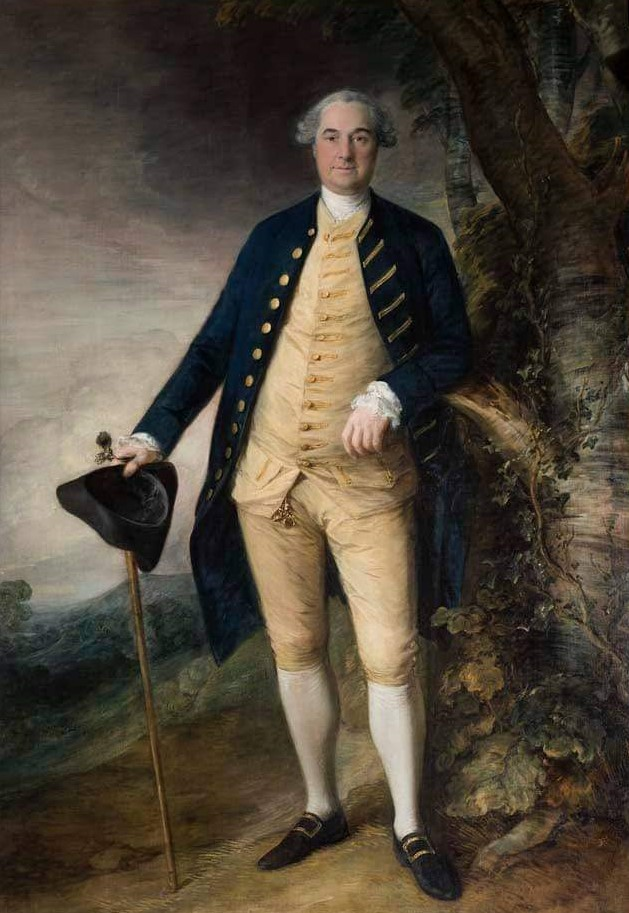
William Gage, 2nd Viscount Gage

William Hall Gage, 2nd Viscount Gage (6 January 1717/18 – 11 October 1791) was a Peer of Ireland and a British politician who sat in the House of Commons between 1744 and 1780 when he was raised to the peerage of Great Britain as Baron Gage. He was equerry to the Prince of Wales.

== Biography ==
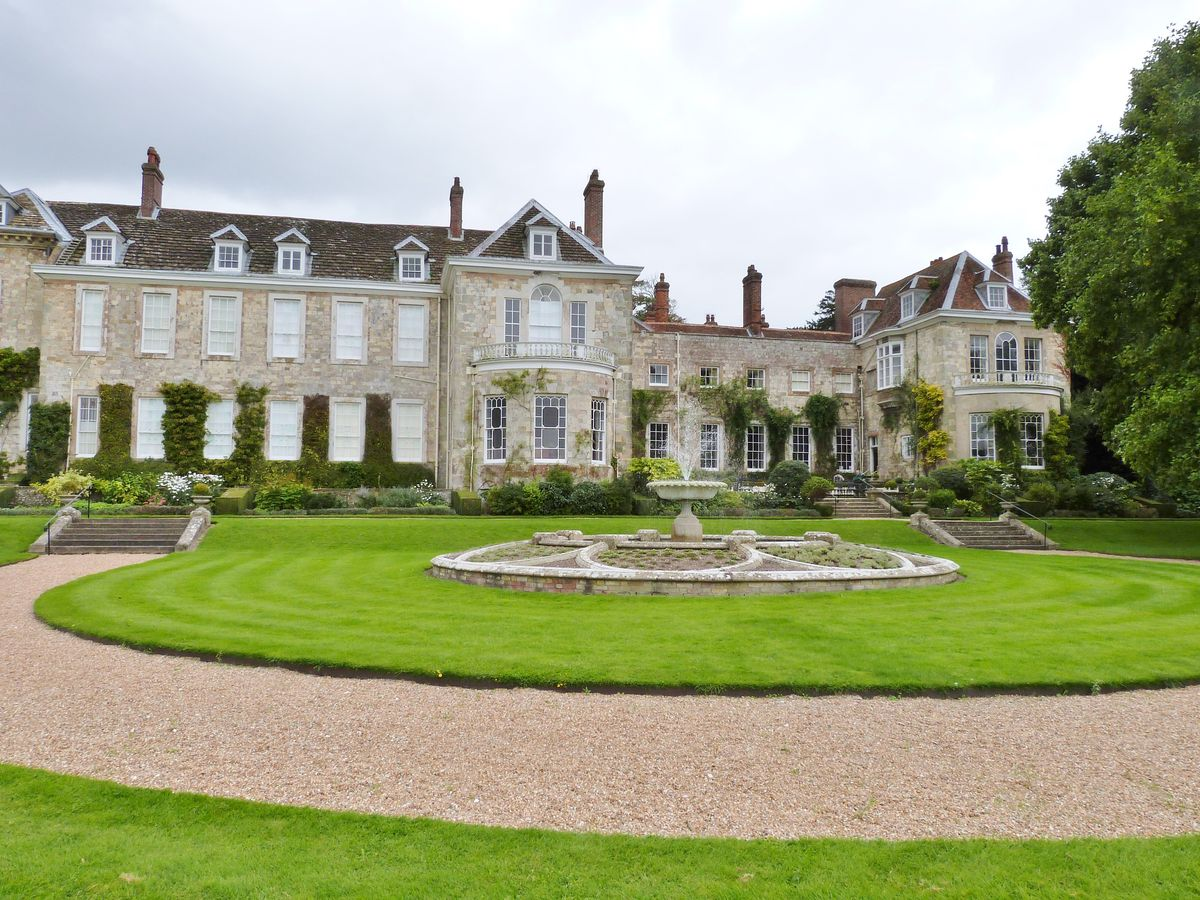
Firle Place from rear

William Hall Gage was born to Thomas Gage and his wife Benedicta Maria Theresa Hall on 6 January 1717/18 and christened 31 January 1717/18 at Westminster St James, Middlesex. He was educated at Westminster School.

From 1744 Gage served five terms as Member of Parliament representing the Seaford borough of Sussex. As the eldest son, he succeeded his father to the title Viscount Gage on 21 December 1754. He served as Paymaster of Pensions from 1755 through 1763 and later from 1765 until 1782 when Parliament dissolved the office. On 3 February 1757 he married Elizabeth Gideon, the daughter of Sir Sampson Gideon. They lived at Firle Place in Firle, Sussex.

In 1780, Gage was created Baron Gage in the Peerage of Great Britain with remainder to his heirs male. His wife died on 1 July 1783. Since he had no heirs male, he was again ennobled as Baron Gage of Highmeadow in the Peerage of Great Britain in 1790, but this time with special remainder to the heirs male of his brothers. Gage died 11 October 1791.

=== Family ===
William Gage's younger brother, Thomas Gage, was Commander-in-Chief of British forces at the beginning of the American Revolution. Thomas's son Sir William Hall Gage was a Royal Navy officer, promoted to admiral of the fleet in 1862.

Gage died childless in 1791 and was succeeded by Henry Gage, 3rd Viscount Gage, the eldest son of his brother Thomas.

== See also ==
- Viscount Gage

Parliament of Great Britain
Preceded by Sir William Gage, 7th Bt; William Hay	Member of Parliament for Seaford; 1744–1747; With: William Hay	Succeeded by William Hay; William Pitt
Preceded by William Hay; William Pitt	Member of Parliament for Seaford; 1754–1780; With: William Hay 1754–1755; James Peachey 1755–1768; George Medley 1768–1780	Succeeded by John Durand; John Robinson
Peerage of Ireland
Preceded by Thomas Gage	Viscount Gage; 1754–1791	Succeeded by Henry Gage
Peerage of Great Britain
New creation	Baron Gage (of Firle); 1780–1791	Extinct
New creation	Baron Gage (of High Meadow); 1790–1791	Succeeded by Henry Gage
