= Firle =

Village in East Sussex, England

Coordinates: 50.847°N 0.086°E

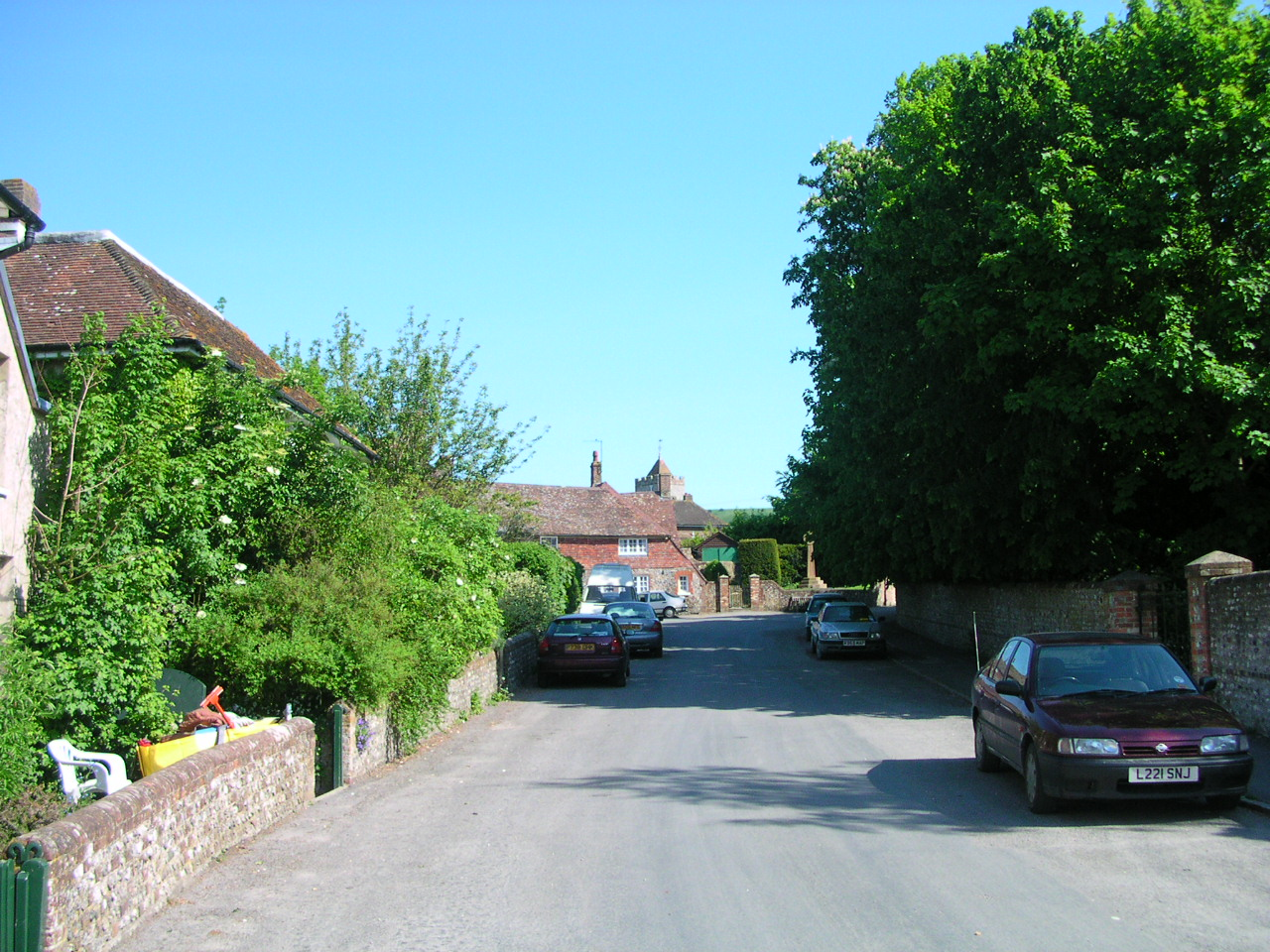
- The Street, Firle

- Location within East Sussex
- Area: 13.9 km^{2} (5.4 sq mi)
- Population: 327 (Parish-2007)
  - Density: 61/sq mi (24/km^{2})
- OS grid reference: TQ469073
  - London: 47 miles (76 km) NNW
- District: Lewes
- Shire county: East Sussex
- Region: South East
- Country: England
- Sovereign state: United Kingdom
- Post town: LEWES
- Postcode district: BN8
- Dialling code: 01273
- Police: Sussex
- Fire: East Sussex
- Ambulance: South East Coast
- UK Parliament: Lewes

Firle (/ˈfɜːrl/; Sussex dialect: Furrel /ˈfʌrəl/) is a village and civil parish in the Lewes district of East Sussex, England. Firle refers to an Old English word fierol meaning overgrown with oak.

Although the original division of East Firle and West Firle still remains, East Firle is now simply confined to the houses of Heighton Street, which lie to the east of the Firle Park. West Firle is now generally referred to as Firle although West Firle remains its official name. It is located south of the A27 road four miles (9 km) east of Lewes.

== History of the village ==
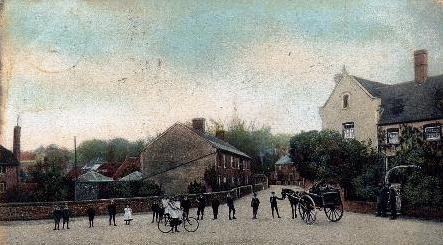
The Street, Firle in 1901

During the reign of Edward the Confessor (1042–66) Firle was part of the Abbey of Wilton's estate. Following the Norman Conquest the village and surrounding lands were passed to Robert, Count of Mortain. Half-brother of King William I, Robert was the largest landowner in the country after the monarch. The village is mentioned in the Domesday Book of 1086, referred to as 'Ferla'. The value of the village is listed as being £44, which was amongst the highest in the county.

The manor house, the site on which Firle Place now stands, was occupied from the early 14th century by the 'de Livet' (Levett) family, an ancient Sussex gentry family of Norman descent who owned the manor. The Levett family would later include founders of Sussex's iron industry, royal courtiers, knights, rectors, an Oxford University dean, a prominent early physician and medical educator, and even a lord mayor of London. An ancient bronze seal found in the 1800s near Eastbourne, now in the collection of the Lewes Castle Museum, shows the coat-of-arms of John Livet and is believed to have belonged to the first member of the family named lord of Firle in 1316.

On the bankruptcy of lord of the manor Thomas Levett in 1440, the ownership passed to Bartholomew Bolney, whose daughter married William Gage in 1472. Following the death of Bolney in 1476 without a male heir, the seat of Firle Place was passed to William Gage and has remained the seat of the Viscount Gage ever since.

During the Second World War, Firle Plantation to the south of the village was the secret operational base of a four-man Home Guard Auxiliary Unit.

== The Greengage at Hengrave Hall, Suffolk ==
The commonly used word greengage is linked with another branch of the Gage family who lived at Hengrave Hall in Suffolk. It would appear that Sir William Gage, 2nd bart (c. 1650–1727), introduced the Gross Reine Claude fruit tree to England from France ca. 1725, which later became known as the greengage plum.

Francis Young, author of The Gages of Hengrave, Suffolk Catholicism 1640-1767.

== Notable residents ==
- Thomas Gage, British army general, was born in Firle.
- Alexandra Gage, Viscountess Gage, businesswoman and fine arts lecturer
- Katherine Mansfield, writer, had close ties with the Bloomsbury Group, lived in Firle for a brief time.
- John Maynard Keynes, economist, another member of the Bloomsbury Group, took an extended lease in a house in Firle in 1925 and died there in 1946. Keynes was cremated and his ashes scattered above the downs of nearby Tilton.
- Virginia Woolf, writer, visited nearby Lewes in December 1910 and decided to relocate in Firle, where she rented a house and renamed it Little Talland House. Pointz Hall, a fictional manor from her novel Between the Acts, is believed to be inspired by Firle Place. Woolf's sister, the painter and interior designer Vanessa Bell, moved to Firle in 1916 taking residence with her live-in lover Duncan Grant in Charleston Farmhouse, which subsequently became a regular haunt of the Bloomsbury Group. Vanessa Bell, her son Quentin Bell, and Duncan Grant are all buried in the churchyard of St Peter's, Firle.

== Village features ==
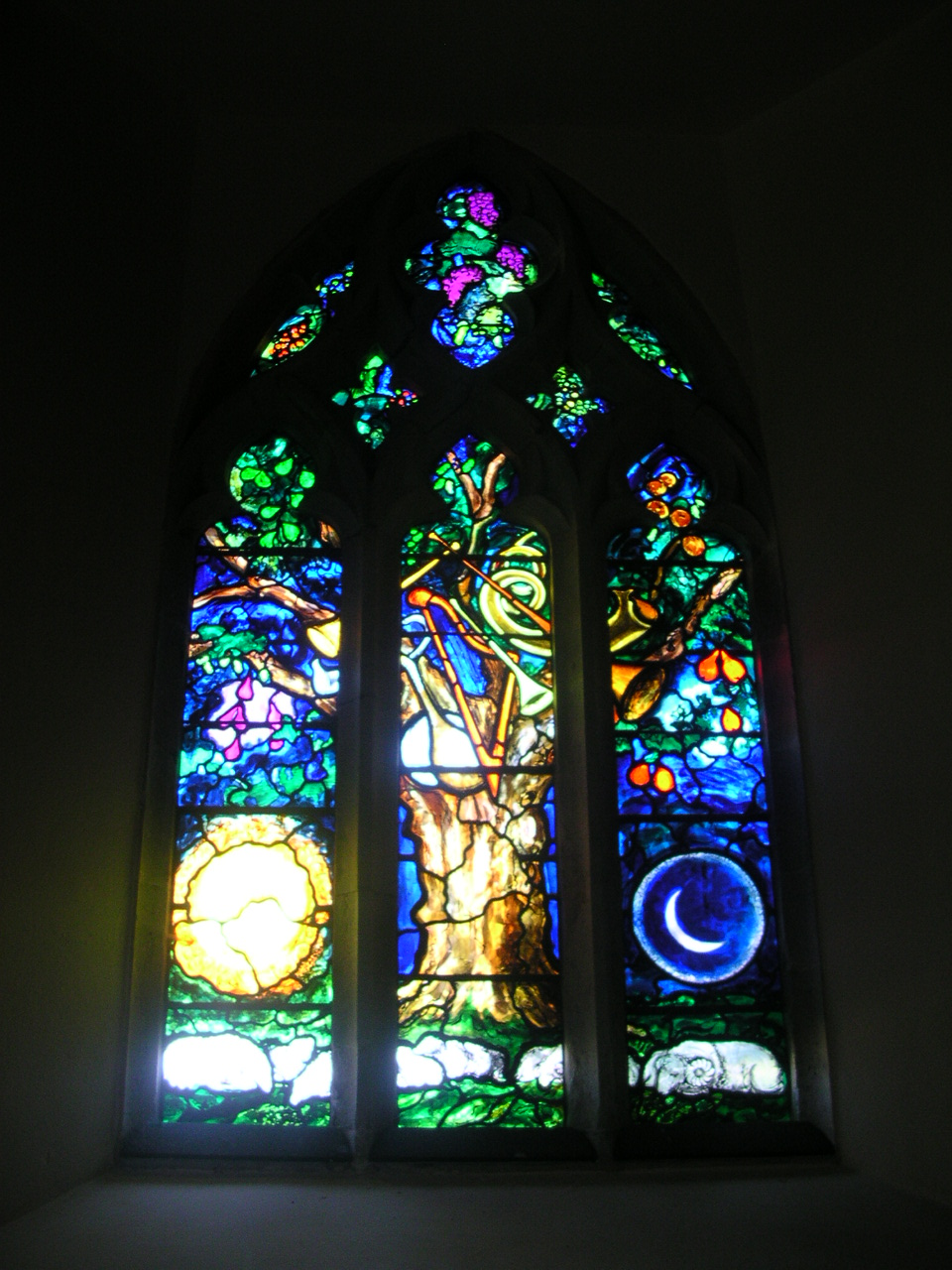
John Piper window

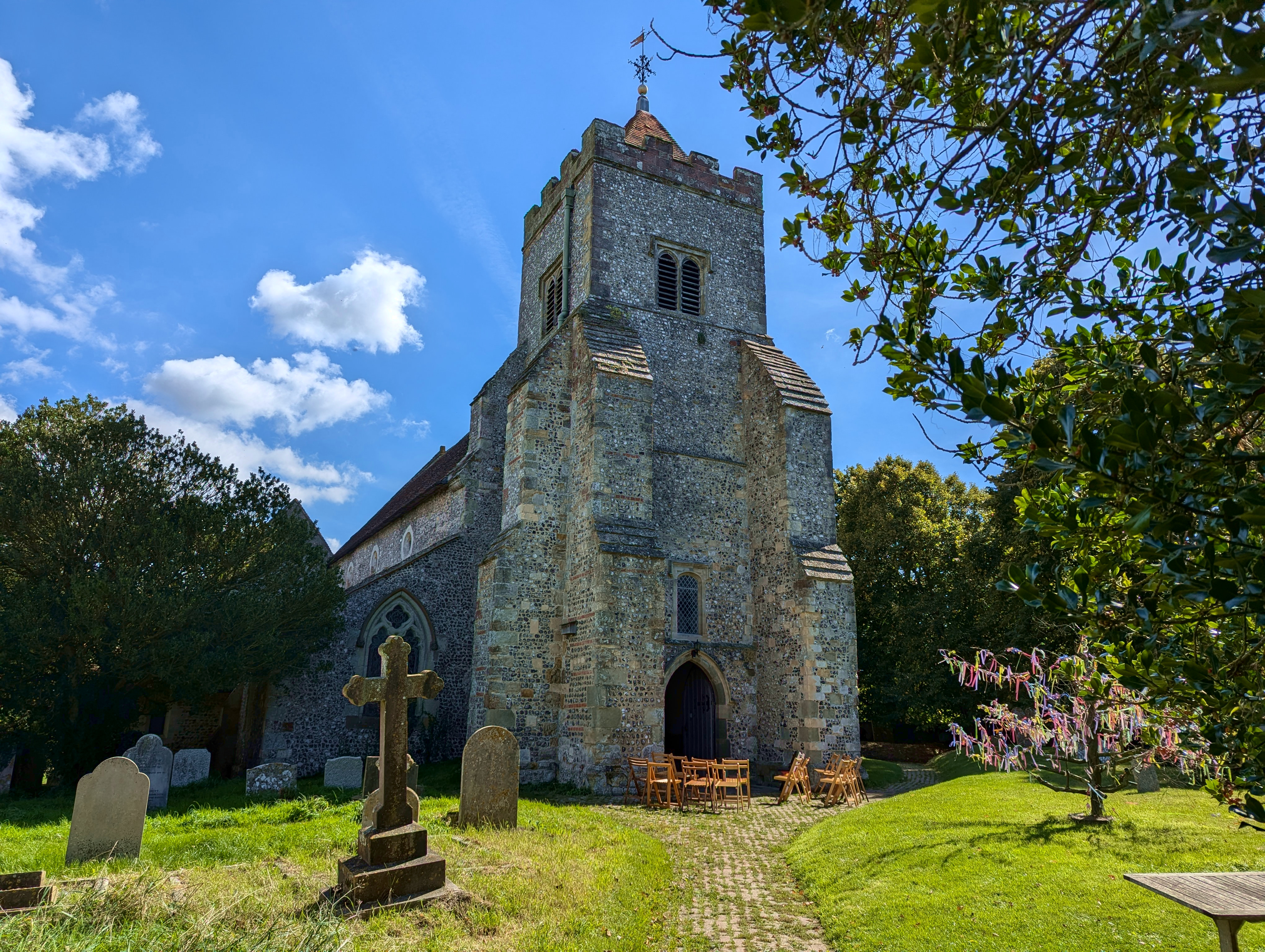
View of the tower of St. Peter's church, at Firle, East Sussex, England. September 2024.

St Peter's Church notably contains an alabaster effigy of Sir John Gage wearing his Order of the Garter and lying beside his wife Philippa. It also has a John Piper stained-glass window in warm colours, depicting Blake's Tree of Life. There are also memorials for those named Bolney, Moreton, Levett, Swaffield and others. The current vicar is the Reverend Peter Owen-Jones.

The Ram Inn is the only remaining one of the village's three original public houses, that previously all acted as resting stops on the Lewes to Alfriston coach road. It was also the village court room where the rents for tenants farmers were collected and set. The area in front of the Ram is called the Beach, not to be confused with the Dock which is further up the street.

Firle Cricket Club was founded in 1758 and is said to be one of the oldest in the country. Even earlier in 1725 Sir William Gage, 7th Baronet challenged the Duke of Richmond to a game of cricket, one of the first recorded matches. The club continues to be central to village life and has two teams which both compete in the East Sussex Cricket League. The Firle 1st XI are in ESCL Division 3 and the Firle 2nd XI are in ESCL Division 9. Previously both teams played in the Cuckmere Valley League; 2007 was their first year in the ESCL.

South of the village lie the South Downs and Firle Beacon, which reaches a height of 712 feet (217 m). The beacon was once a lighting beacon used as part of a warning system during the time of the Spanish Armada in 1588. On the site there are also around 50 Bronze Age burial barrows.

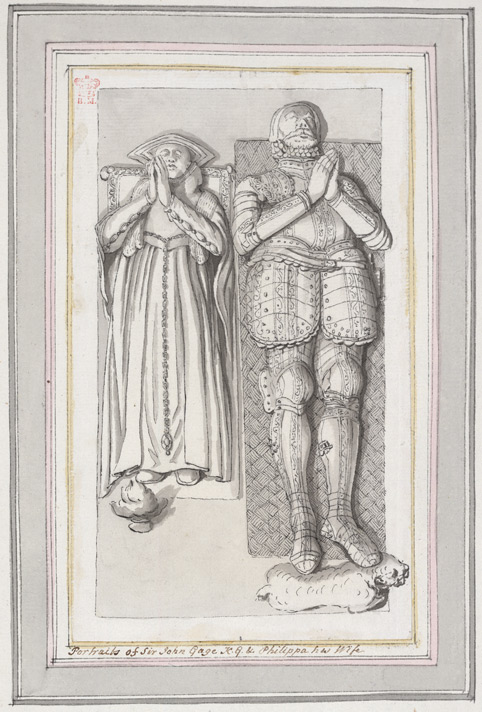
Monument to Sir John Gage and his wife Phillippa in St Peter's Church, Firle. Samuel Hieronymus Grimm

Firle Bonfire Society is first mentioned in 1879 in a diary of the then vicar of Firle, Reverend Crawley, though it was re-formed in 1982 to encourage and promote traditional bonfire festivities in the village. The society forms part of a network of bonfire societies in the Lewes area which serve the purpose both of remembering the Gunpowder Plot and of recalling the fate of the Sussex Martyrs. The village holds its celebrations in October before the main event in Lewes. Traditionally the Firle Bonfire Society Pioneers wear Valencian costumes. It is customary to burn an effigy other than Guy Fawkes; in 2003 an effigy of a Gypsy family in a caravan was burned, sparking a controversy that resulted in members of the bonfire society being arrested.

== Governance ==
On a local level, Firle is governed by Firle Parish Council, which meets every two months in the Firle village memorial hall. Its responsibilities include footpaths, street lighting, playgrounds and minor planning applications. The parish council has five seats available which were uncontested in the May 2007 election. On 8 March 1971 the parish was renamed from "West Firle" to "Firle".

The next level of government is the district council. The parish of Firle lies within the Ouse Valley and Ringmer ward of Lewes District Council which returns three seats to the council.

East Sussex County Council is the next tier of government, for which Firle is within the Ouse Valley East division. The council has responsibility for education, libraries, social services, civil registration, trading standards and transport. Elections for the county council are held every four years.

The UK Parliament constituency for Firle is Lewes. The Liberal Democrat James MacCleary has served as the constituency MP since 2024.

== Landmarks ==
Firle Escarpment is a Site of Special Scientific Interest (SSSI) within the parish which extends into the neighbouring parish of Beddingham. The site is an extensive area of chalkland which hosts a wide range of flora. The rarest of these is the early spider orchid Ophrys sphegodes.

== See also ==
- Firle Hill Climb
