= Thomas Gage, 1st Viscount Gage =

British landowner and politician

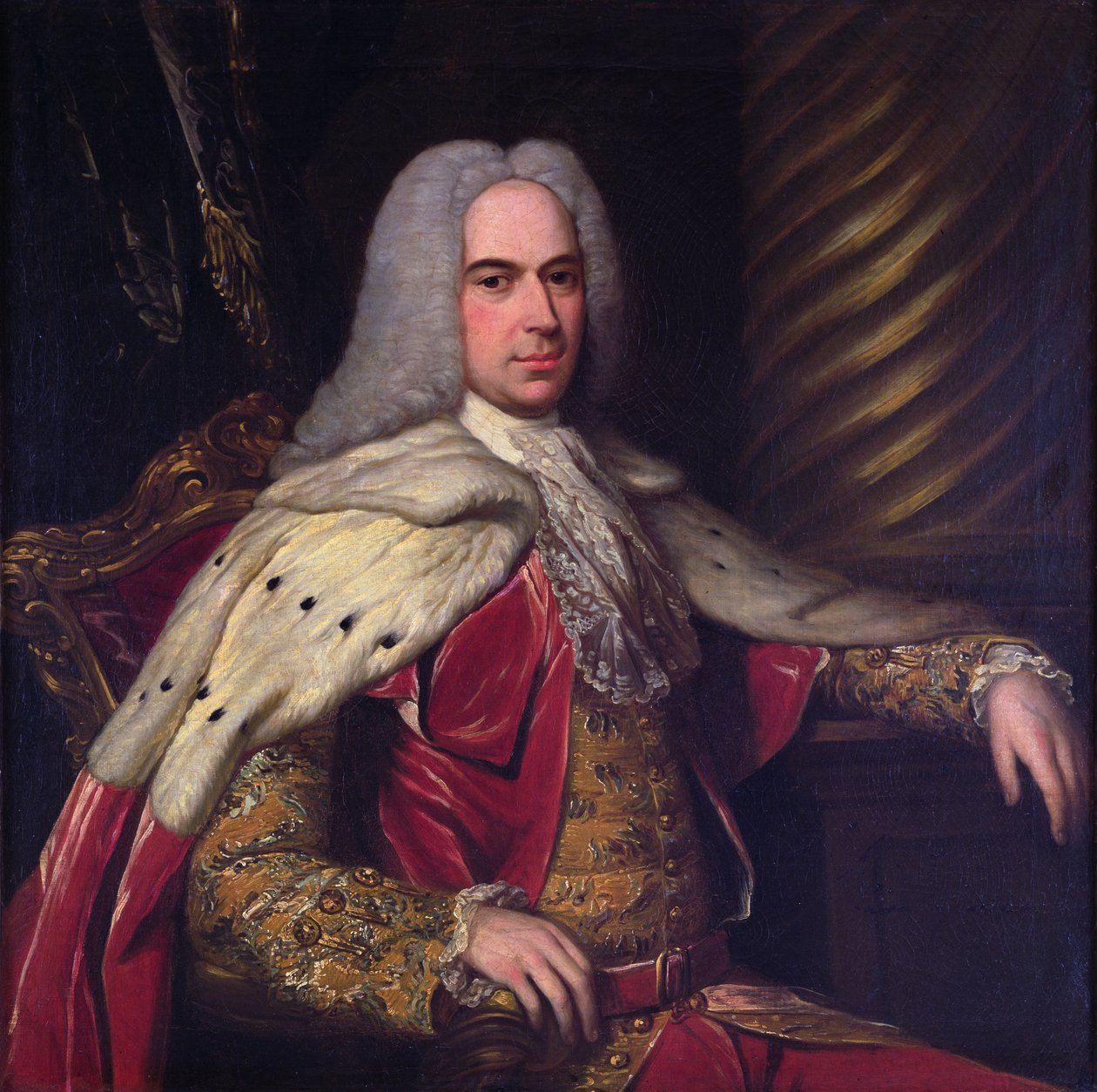
Portrait of Lord Gage

Thomas Gage, 1st Viscount Gage (c. 1695 – 21 December 1754) was a British landowner and Whig politician who sat in the House of Commons of Great Britain between 1717 and 1754.

== Early life ==
Gage was the eldest son of Joseph Gage of Shirburn Castle and Elizabeth Penruddock, the daughter and heiress of Sir George Penruddock. He succeeded his father-in-law to High Meadow in 1714.

He converted to the Church of England in 1715, perhaps to enable him to sit in parliament.

== Career ==
Gage was elected Member of Parliament for Minehead at a by-election on 11 April 1717, but was unseated on petition on 23 May 1717. On 14 September 1720, King George I created him Baron Gage of Castlebar in the county of Mayo, and Viscount Gage of Castle Island in the county of Kerry of the Kingdom of Ireland. Although styled as Viscount and eligible to sit in the Irish House of Lords, this did not prevent him from sitting in the British House of Commons. In 1719 he was one of the original backers of the Royal Academy of Music, establishing a London opera company which commissioned numerous works from Handel and others.

Gage was elected MP for Tewkesbury at a by-election on 25 October 1721 and was elected again at the 1722 general election. In his first session of this parliament, he made several speeches against the special tax on Papists. In April 1727 he spoke for the motion for a vote of credit. He was returned again at the 1727 general election. He exposed the fraudulent sale of the Derwentwater estates on 31 March 1732, and was subsequently rewarded with £2,000 for this under the Forfeited Estates (Greenwich Hospital) Act 1734 (8 Geo. 2. c. 29). At the 1734 general election, he was returned again as MP for Tewkesbury. He introduced a bill to prevent clandestine marriages, in 1736, but it was rejected. In 1738, it was rumoured that he was to be appointed as Governor of Barbados, but the appointment was never materialised, probably because he lacked sufficient political connections. He went into opposition with Pulteney and the Patriot Whigs in 1739, but in February 1741, he was one of the opposition Whigs who withdrew on the motion for Walpole's removal. He was returned to parliament again at the 1741 general election.

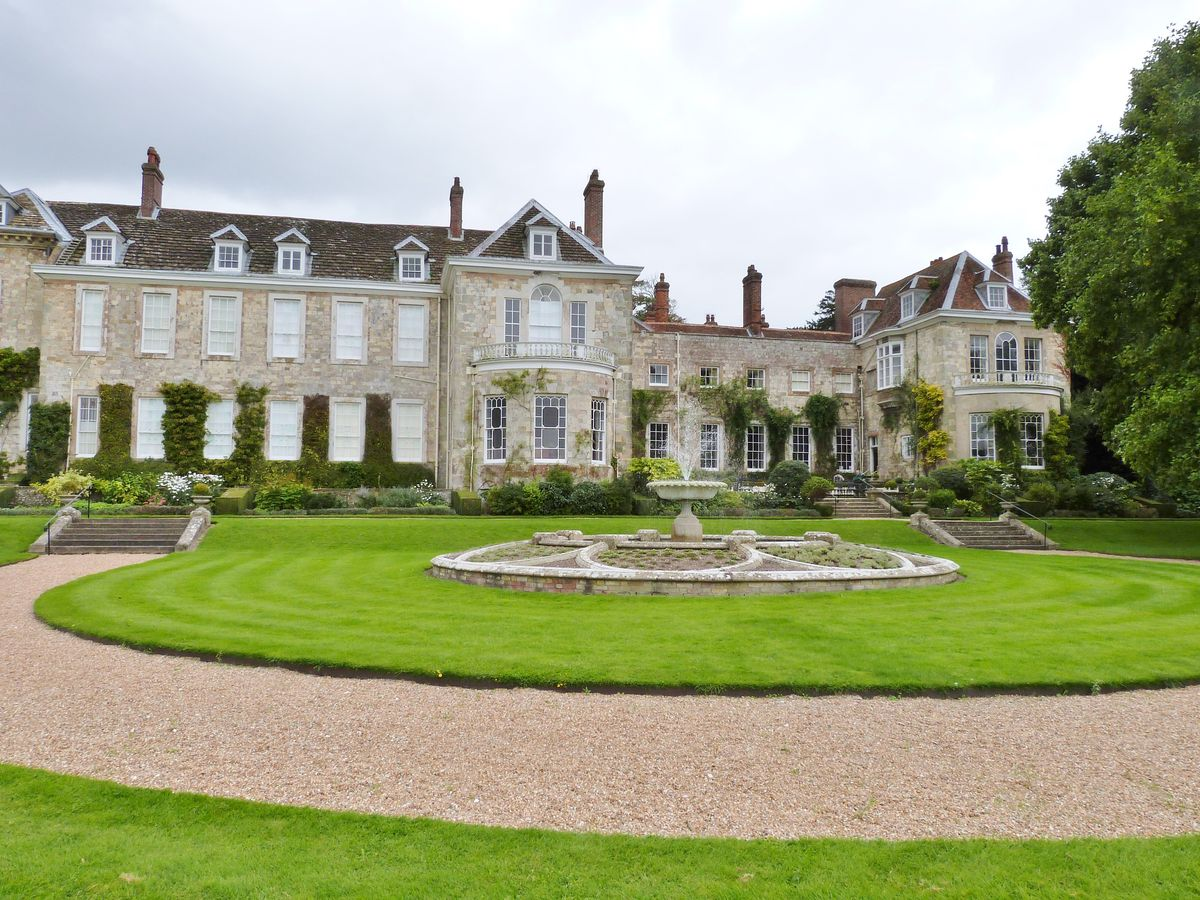
Firle Place from rear

On 23 April 1744, his cousin, Sir William Gage, 7th Baronet, died without children, and Gage inherited the baronetcy and the family estate of Firle Place. Sir William's late father was Gage's uncle - Sir John Gage, 4th Baronet, Sheriff of Sussex. The main line of the family, up to the 7th Baronet, had been Roman Catholic recusants who had purchased their baronetcy from King James I, and Gage quietly resumed practising Roman Catholicism, although his children were raised in the Church of England. At the 1747 general election, he was returned again for Tewkesbury and joined the opposition. In 1747 was appointed Steward of the Household of Frederick, Prince of Wales and held the post until 1751.

== First Wife & Children ==
Under a marriage settlement dated 3 October 1713, he married Benedicta Maria Theresa Hall, daughter and heiress of Henry Benedict Hall of High Meadow, Gloucestershire and his wife Frances Fortescue.

Through his marriage to Benedicta, Thomas acquired wealthy estates in Gloucestershire in 1714 including High Meadow house, which became his principal residence, and the sinecure of Verderer of the Forest of Dean. Their marriage, although unfortunately unhappy, still produced two sons and one daughter.

1. William Hall Gage, 2nd Viscount Gage, born on 6 Jan 1717/18 and christened on 29 Jan 1717/18 at Westminster St James, Middlesex, England.

2. General, the Hon. Thomas Gage, born on 10 March 1718/19 at Firle and christened on 31 March 1719 at Westminster St James, Middlesex, England.

3. Hon. Benedicta Maria Teresa Gage, married on 6 March 1755, at St George's, Hanover Sq, a catholic, George Tasburgh of Bodney, Norfolk, died without issue.

Benedicta died at Bristol on 25 July 1749, and was buried on 30 July 1749 at Newland, co. Gloucester, having long been separated from Thomas, who married Jane Bond within a year of Benedicta's death.

== Second Wife ==
He married secondly on 26 December 1750, Jane Bond 'daughter of one Godfrey', and widow of Henry Jermyn Bond, Esq. of Bury St. Edmunds. Her first husband Henry was a nephew (via his wife) of a Gage cousin, Sir William Gage, 2nd Baronet of Hengrave. Jane died without issue, shortly after Thomas, on 8 October 1757 in Dover Street, Piccadilly, London. Her will was proved 1757, and she was buried in Hengrave Church, Sussex (Suffolk?).

== Later life ==
He had extensive remodelling work done on Firle Place between 1743 and 1753, and was involved in a number of land rights disputes regarding windfall trees, soil rights, and manorial waste. Gage also spent considerable time collecting paintings which are still housed in the Long Gallery of Firle Place today.

Gage and his son were defeated at the 1754 general election, having decided not to respond to the threats of his voters only to vote for candidates who promised to give £1,500 towards mending the roads.

== Death and legacy ==
Gage died on 21 December 1754 and was buried at Firle. He was succeeded by his eldest son William Hall Gage, 2nd Viscount Gage. He also had a daughter, Theresa, and a second son Thomas Gage who went on to fame as Commander-in-Chief of the British Army in British America at the beginning of the American War of Independence.

== See also ==
- Viscount Gage

== Notes ==
Parliament of Great Britain
Preceded by William Dowdeswell (1); Nicholas Lechmere	Member of Parliament for Tewkesbury; 1721–1754; With: William Dowdeswell (1) 1721–1722; George Reade 1722–1734; Robert Tracy 1734–1741; John Martin 1741–1747; William Dowdeswell (2) 1747–1754	Succeeded by Nicolson Calvert; John Martin
Preceded by Joseph Micklethwait; Thomas Lumley	Member of Parliament for Arundel; 1727–1728; With: Sir John Shelley, Bt	Succeeded by Sir John Shelley, Bt; John Lumley
Government offices
Preceded by Humphrey Howarth	Governor of Barbados; 1738–1739	Succeeded by Robert Byng
Peerage of Ireland
New title	Viscount Gage; 1720–1754	Succeeded by William Hall Gage
Baronetage of England
Preceded by William Gage	Baronet (of Firle Place); 1744–1754	Succeeded by William Hall Gage
