= Alexandra Gage, Viscountess Gage =

British academic

The Right Honourable The Viscountess Gage

Personal details
- Born: Alexandra Murray Templeton; 1969 (age 56–57)
- Spouse: Nicholas Gage, 8th Viscount Gage
- Children: 1
- Occupation: Lecturer; businesswoman

Alexandra Murray Gage, Viscountess Gage (née Templeton; born 1969) is a British academic, businesswoman, and aristocrat. She is a senior lecturer at the University of Brighton, teaching fine art at the university's School of Art and Media. As the second wife of Nicholas Gage, 8th Viscount Gage, she is the châtelaine of Firle Place in Sussex. Lady Gage is the founder and owner of the skincare business Beauty Energy Balms, which makes products from herbs grown in the garden of the Firle estate.

== Biography ==
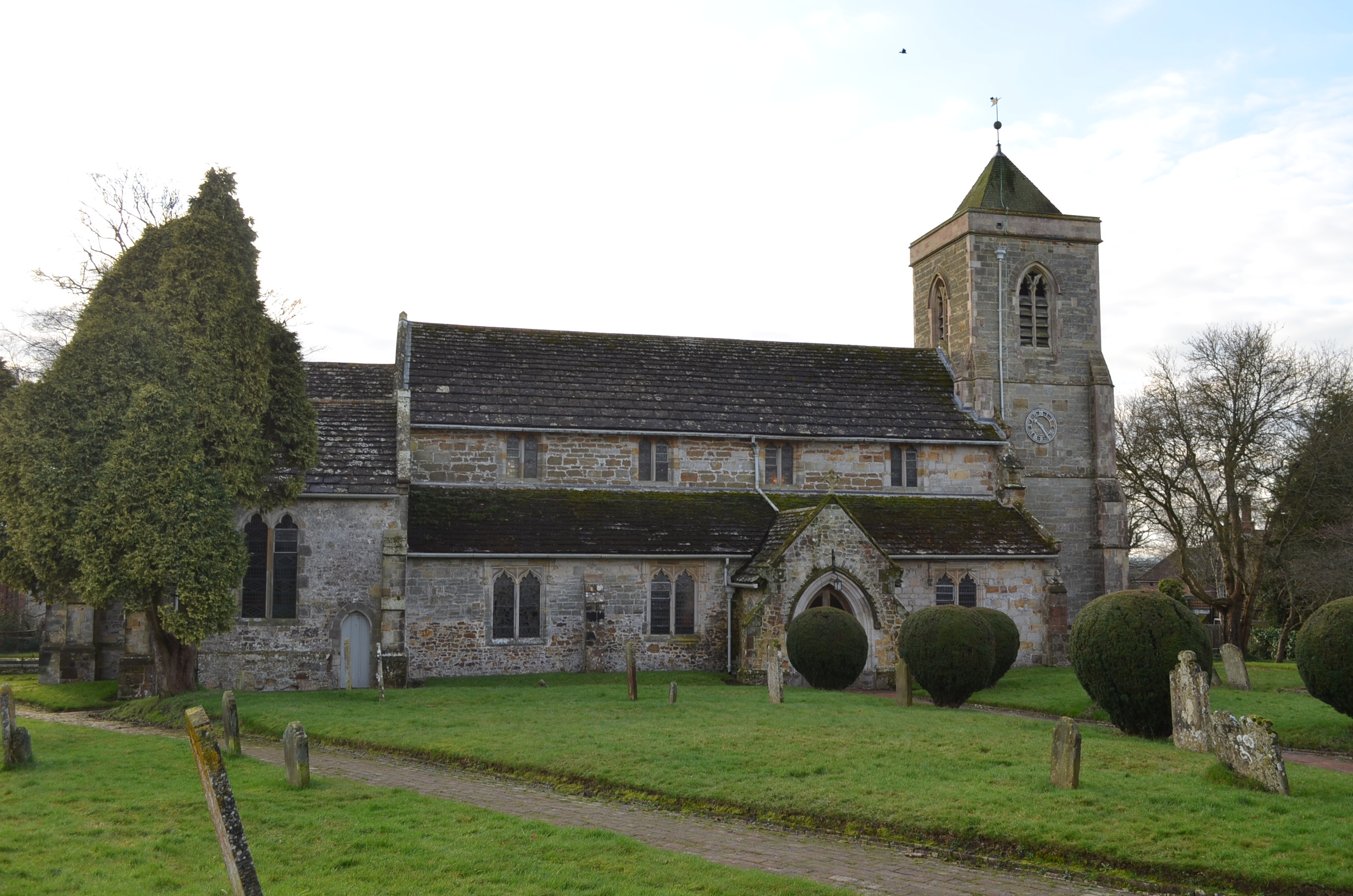
St Thomas à Becket Church, where Lord and Lady Gage were married.

Daughter of John Clarke Murray Templeton, of Brighton, Lady Gage married Nicholas Gage, 8th Viscount Gage in 2009 at St Thomas à Becket Church, Framfield in an Anglican ceremony celebrated by Rev. Peter Owen-Jones. They have one son together, The Honourable John Valentine Gage. She is Lord Gage's second wife, as he divorced Lady Diana Adrienne Beatty in 2004, and is thirty-eight years younger than her husband. As the Viscountess Gage, she manages the family estate, Firle Place, which is open to the public four months out of the year. When Firle Place is used for television and filming projects, she and her husband stay at Charleston Farmhouse, another one of their properties.

Lady Gage founded the company Beauty Energy Balms, which makes skincare products from herbs grown in the gardens at Firle Place.
