= Firle Place =

Manor house in East Sussex, England

Coordinates: 50°50′42″N 0°05′30″E

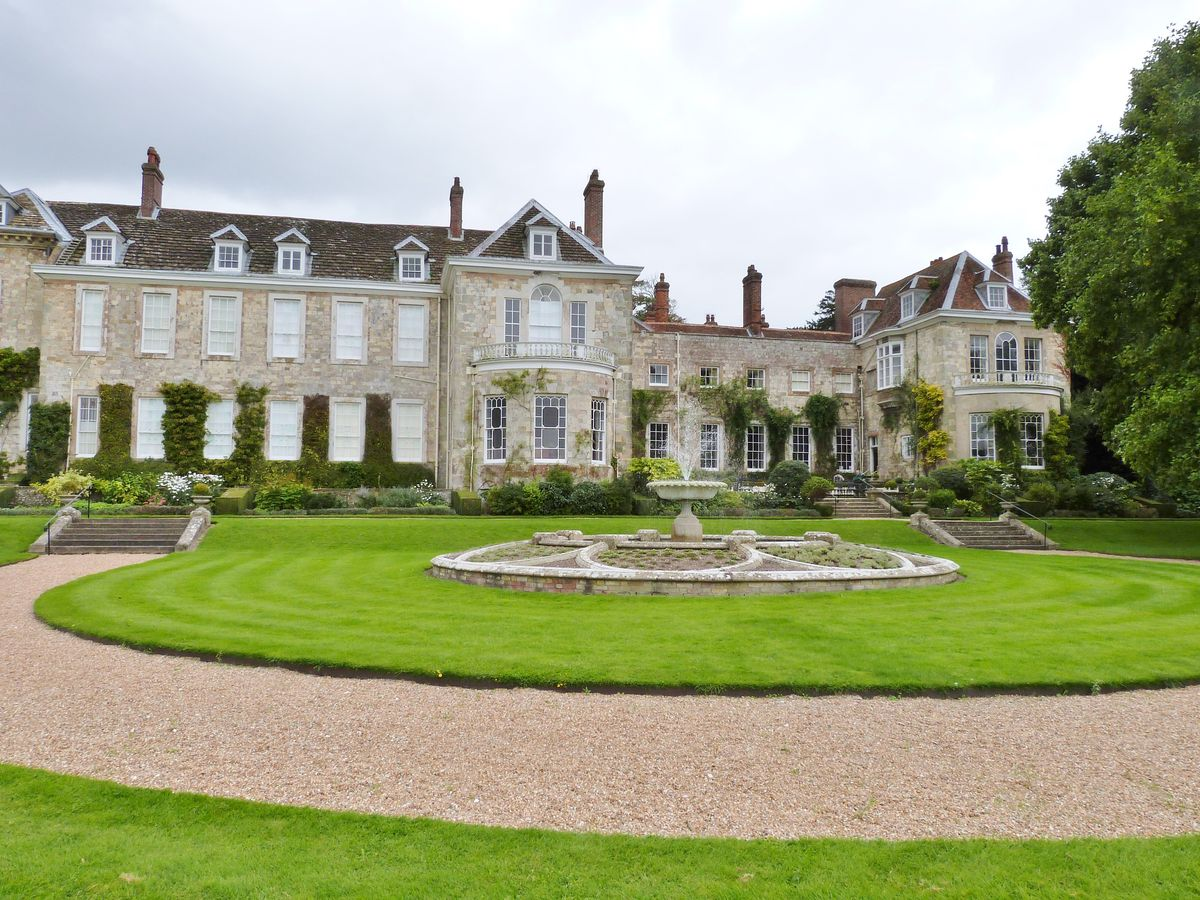
- Firle Place, East Sussex
- Interactive map of the Firle Place area

General information
- Location: Sussex
- Construction started: 15th Century
- Owner: Viscount Gage

Website
- https://firle.com/

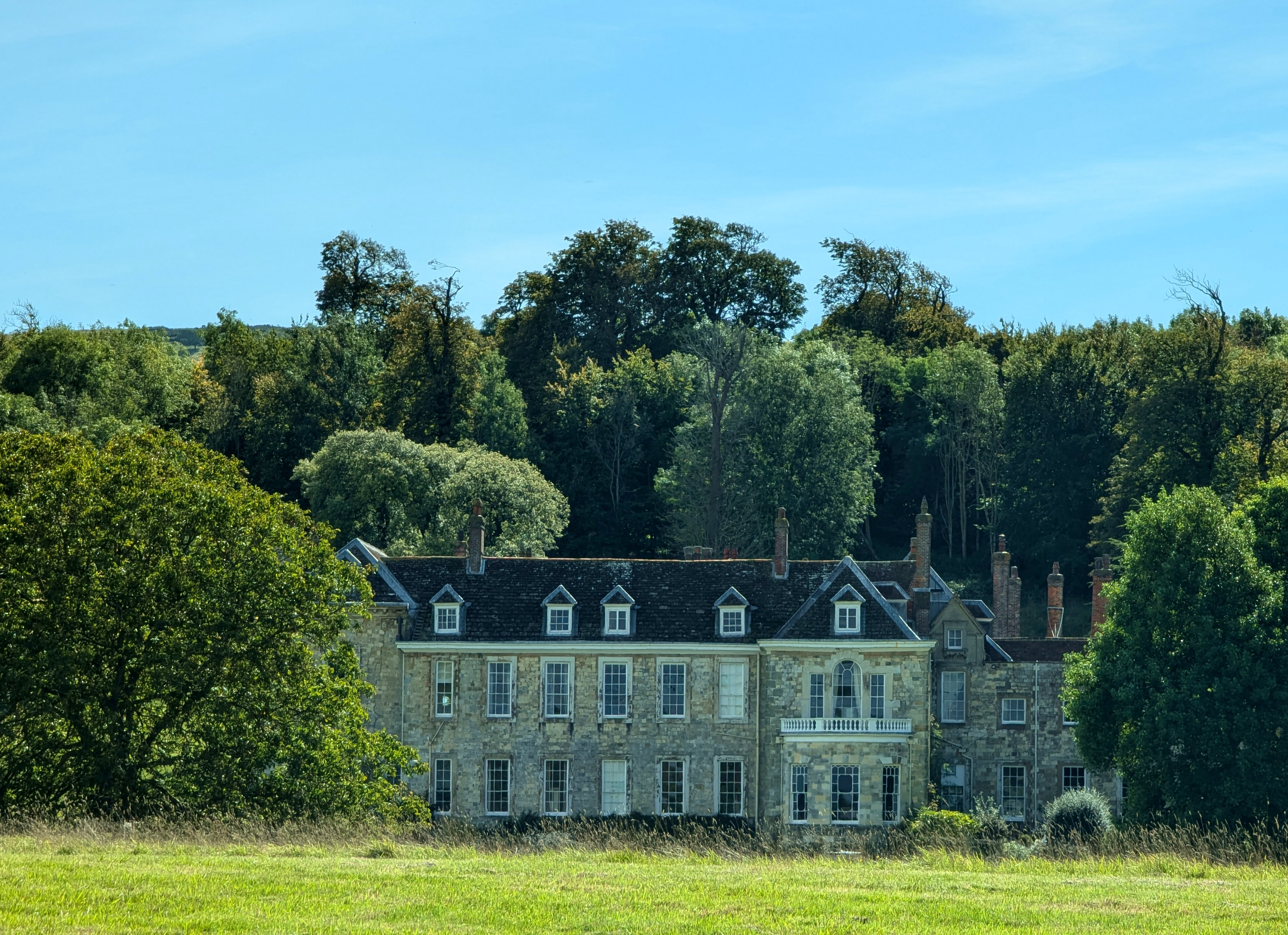
The North Front of Firle Place, Firle, East Sussex, England. September 2024.

Firle Place is a manor house in Firle, East Sussex, United Kingdom. The Gage family have owned the land at Firle since acquiring it from the Levett family in the 15th century. The manor house was first built in the late 15th century by Sir John Gage, who made Firle Place his principal home. He held many high offices, including Constable of the Tower and was an executor of Henry VIII's will.

== History ==
The external cladding of the building is Georgian, using Caen Stone to make it look like a classical French Chateau. This work was completed by Sir William Gage, 7th Baronet who inherited the house in 1713 and the house is set in typically open parkland. The interior of the house however is Tudor in style and circulates around a central courtyard. The house has an extensive collection of paintings, porcelain and furniture, including works by Gainsborough, Reynolds, Van Dyck, Raphael, Puligo, Zoffany and Teniers.

During World War I, students from the nearby Southover Manor School in Lewes were housed here, and during World War II, Canadian soldiers were quartered here.

Open to the public during the summer months, the house and grounds area also used as a film and television location, it has featured in shows, including the BBC's Jonathan Creek, the three-part miniseries The Line of Beauty and the 2020 adaptation of Jane Austen's Emma. Since 2017, Channel 4's Bake Off: The Professionals (previously Bake Off: Crème de la Crème when on the BBC) has filmed its series at the house annually.

== The Gage Family ==
Since the 15th century the Gages have lived at Firle, following the marriage of William Gage to Agnes Bolney whose family had previously owned the seat at Firle. (The Bolneys held the lordship of Firle briefly after acquiring it from the bankrupt lord of the manor Thomas Levett.) This holding was further expanded by their son Sir John Gage who inherited land belonging to his father-in-law, Sir Thomas St Clere. In 1479 a second John Gage was born and it was he who became a ward of the Duke of Buckingham when his father died in 1496. From early on, the Gage family were significant patrons of St Peter's Church, which stands adjacent to Firle Place.

Sir John became quite prominent at the court of King Henry VIII and even accompanied the king on an expedition to France. Following such campaigns and his competence in battle he was appointed Vice-Chamberlain to the King. Sir John also served as a key figure in the dissolution of the monasteries in Sussex, despite the fact that he remained a Catholic.

Sir John's son, Edward, later became a Knight of the Bath and the Sheriff of Sussex and in 1556 oversaw the execution of the 17 "Sussex Martyrs" during the Marian Persecutions of 1555–57.

The Gage Baronetcy was created for John Gage (d. 1633) in 1622. The 7th Baronet, Sir William Gage (1695–1744), was notable for his interest in cricket, particularly in Sussex. It is often thought that the beginnings of what is now Firle Cricket Club started with Sir William. In 1754 this title of Baronet was raised for Irish-born Thomas Gage to the Peerage of Ireland as Baron Gage and Viscount Gage.

Another notable Gage was General Thomas Gage, who was made Commander in Chief of the British forces in North America. Following the outbreak of the American War of Independence he was relatively successful, but after disastrous losses at the Battle of Bunker Hill he was replaced. His son, also called Thomas Gage (1781–1820), following what was now a family tradition, was a botanist and traveller and had the flower genus Gagea named after him.

The current Viscount Gage, Henry Nicholas Gage, lives at Firle with his wife, Alexandra Murray Templeton.
