= William Hay (Seaford MP) =

English writer and Whig politician

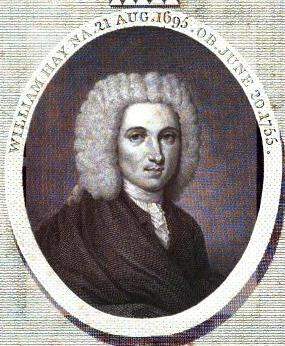
William Hay Portrait

William Hay (1695–1755), of Glyndebourne, Sussex was an English writer and Whig politician who sat in the House of Commons from 1734 to 1755.

== Early life ==
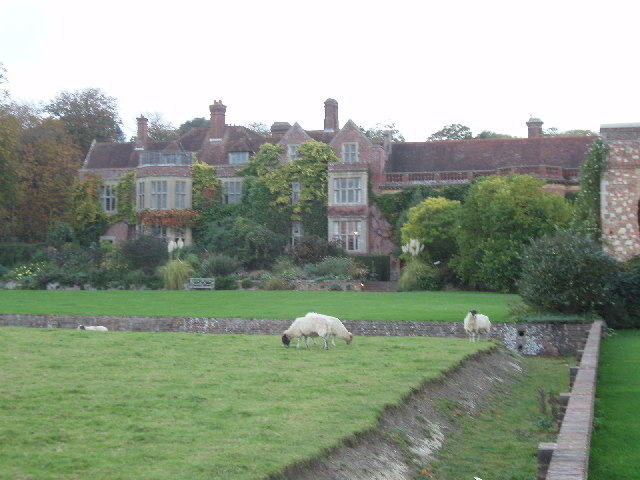
Glyndebourne, Sussex

Hay was born on 21 August 1695, the second but on[y surviving son of William Hay of Glyndebourne, Sussex, and his wife, Barbara Stapley, youngest daughter of Sir John Stapley, Bt. of Patcham, Sussex. He was born with a physical disability affecting his back which rendered him bent and "scarce five feet high". Both his parents died while he was still an infant. In 1705 he was sent to school at Newick, and then in 1710 to the grammar school at Lewes. He matriculated at Christ Church, Oxford, on 20 March 1712.

Leaving university without a degree, Hay was admitted in 1715 to the Middle Temple but there is no evidence that he was called to the bar. While pursuing his legal studies he contracted smallpox, which seriously affected his eyesight. In 1718 he travelled through many parts of England and Scotland, and in 1720 he made a tour through France, Germany, and Holland. On his return he settled down at Glyndebourne and became an active county magistrate, and in 1733 was appointed chairman of quarter sessions for the eastern division of Sussex.

== Career ==
At a by-election in January 1734 Hay was returned to the House of Commons as Member of Parliament for Seaford, and continued to represent the constituency until his death. He was a Whig, and a general supporter of the policy of Sir Robert Walpole.

In 1735 Hay headed a parliamentary committee that reported on prison reform. In March 1736 and again in February 1737 he brought in a bill for poor relief, but failed to carry it through the house. In February 1738 he took part in the debate on the reduction of the army, and in May following was appointed a commissioner for victualling the navy. During the discussion of the navy estimates in February 1740 he defended himself from a personal attack, and invited scrutiny of his conduct at the victualling office. In December 1747 he brought in a bill for the relief of the poor by voluntary charities, which passed through the Commons without opposition, but was dropped in the House of Lords.

Hay was appointed keeper of the records in the Tower of London in 1753, and died of apoplexy at Glyndebourne on 22 June 1755. He was buried in Glynde churchyard. Hay suffered from severe scoliosis, scarcely five feet high, and assiduous in his parliamentary duties.

== Family ==
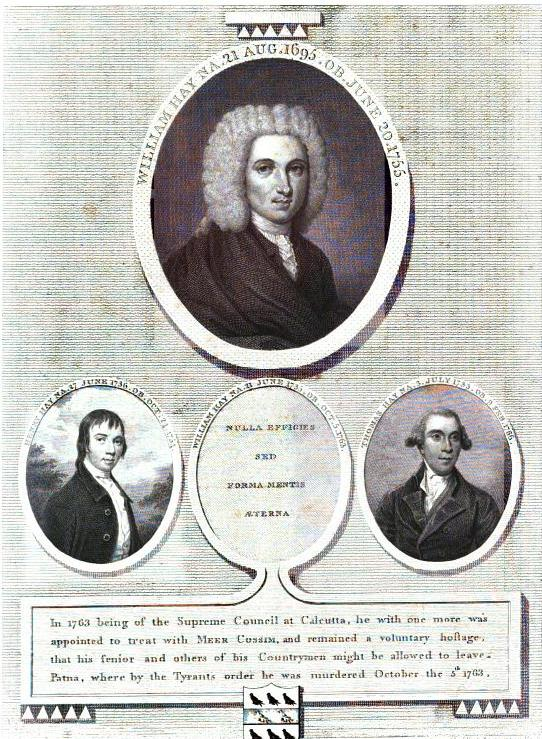
William Hay, engraving published 1794, with his sons Thomas and Henry, and note on his son William

In 1731 Hay had married Elizabeth, the second daughter of Thomas Pelham of Catsfield Place, Sussex, by whom he had three sons and two daughters. Pelham was a cousin of the Duke of Newcastle, by whose influence Hay entered parliament.

The eldest son, Thomas, lieutenant-colonel in the Queen's dragoons, represented Lewes from March 1768 to September 1780, and died on 9 February 1786. His second son, William, a member of the supreme council at Calcutta, was murdered while a hostage at Patna on 5 October 1763. His youngest son, Henry, died on 24 October 1754, aged 18.

None of his five children produced offspring and on the death in 1824 of Frances, the younger of his two daughters, Glyndebourne passed to his nephew, the Rev. Francis Tutté, son of his sister Barbara, and eventually to William Langham Christie.

== Works ==
Hay was the author of:

- An Essay on Civil Government, treating summarily of its necessity, original, dissolution, forms, and properties (anonymous), London, 1728.
- Mount Caburn. A Poem humbly inscribed to her Grace the Dutchess of Newcastle, London, 1730.
- Remarks on the Laws relating to the Poor; with Proposals for their better Relief and Employment. By a member of parliament. First published in 1735 … with an Appendix containing the Resolutions of the House of Commons on the same subject in 1735, London, 1751.
- Religio Philosophi, or the Principles of Morality and Christianity, illustrated from a View of the Universe and of Man's Situation in it, London, 1753; 2nd edit., London 1754; 3rd edit., London, 1760; new edit., 1831.
- Deformity; an Essay, London, 1754; 2nd edit., London, 1754. Reprinted in vol. i. of Robert Dodsley's Fugitive Pieces on Various Subjects by Several Authors in 1761, 1762, 1765, and 1771. This was Hay's reflection on his own life as a hunchback.
- The Immortality of the Soul London, 1754. This was a poem translated from the Latin De Animi Immortalitate (1754) of Isaac Hawkins Browne.
- Martialis Epigrammata Selecta. Anglicè reddidit Gulielmus Hay, appendicem sibi vendicant Couleius et alii (Latin and English), London, 1755; also with the English only.

Hay's collected works were published at the expense of his two daughters, under the editorship of their cousin, the Rev. Francis Tutté, in 1794, London, 2 vols. His parliamentary journal has been published.

== Notes ==
Attribution

This article incorporates text from a publication now in the public domain: Stephen, Leslie; Lee, Sidney, eds. (1891). "Hay, William (1695-1755)". Dictionary of National Biography. Vol. 25. London: Smith, Elder & Co.

Parliament of Great Britain
Preceded by Sir Philip Yorke; Sir William Gage, Bt	Member of Parliament for Seaford; 1734–1755; With: Sir William Gage, Bt to 1744; William Hall Gage 1744–47; William Pitt 1747–54; William Hall Gage from 1754	Succeeded by William Hall Gage; James Peachey
