= Gage baronets =

Title in the Baronetage of England

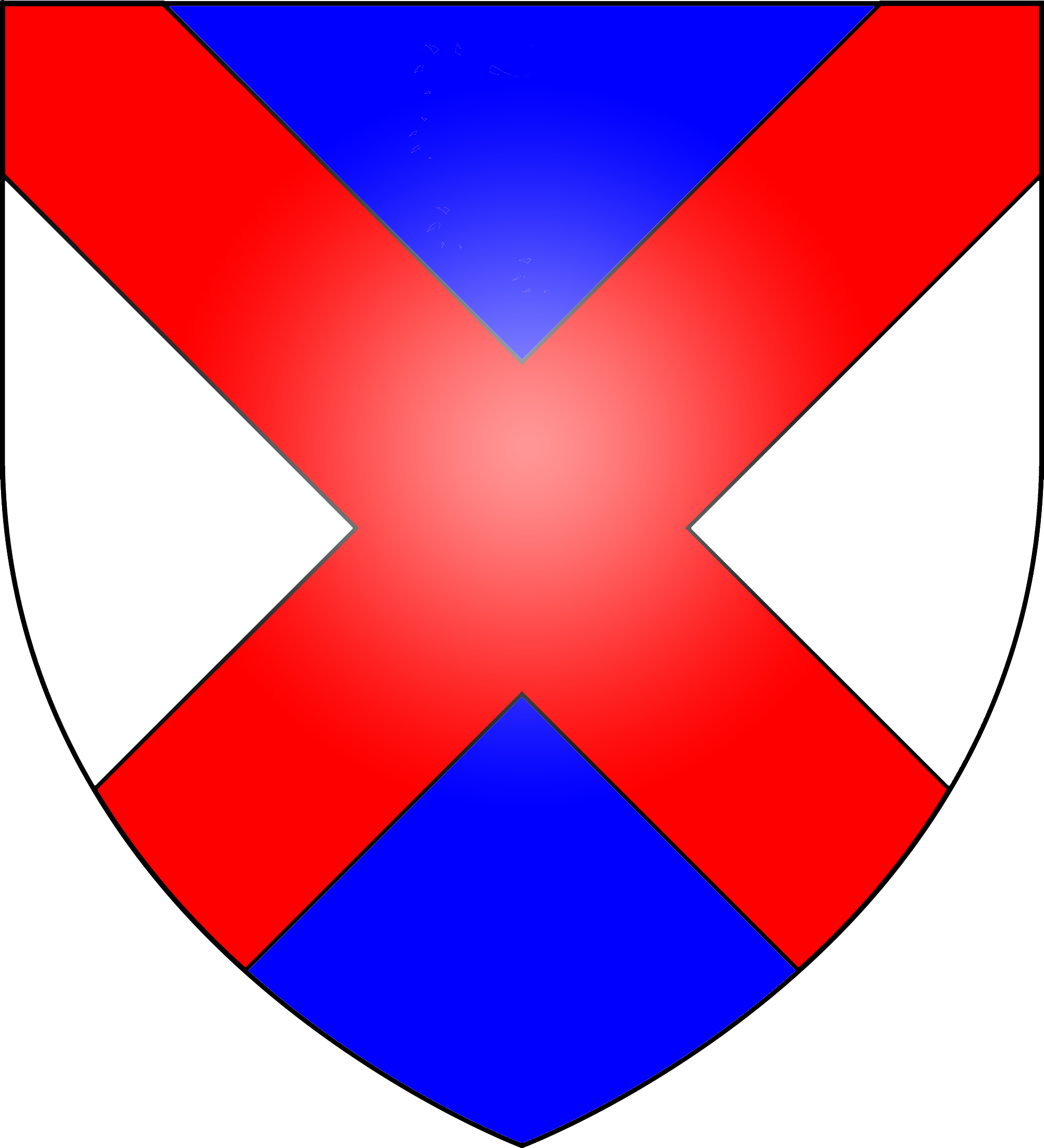
Coat of arms of the Gage baronets of Hengrave

There have been two baronetcies created for persons with the surname Gage, both in the Baronetage of England. One creation is extant as of 2008.

The Gage Baronetcy, of Firle Place in the County of Sussex, was created in the Baronetage of England on 26 March 1622. For more information on this creation, see the Viscount Gage.

The Gage, later Rokewode-Gage Baronetcy, of Hengrave in the County of Suffolk, was created in the Baronetage of England on 15 July 1662. For more information on this creation, see Rokewode-Gage baronets.

== Gage baronets, of Firle Place (1622) ==
- see the Viscount Gage

== Gage, later Rokewode-Gage baronets, of Hengrave (1662) ==
- see Rokewode-Gage baronets
