= Henry Gage, 3rd Viscount Gage =

British Army officer (1761–1808)

Major-General The Right Honourable The Viscount Gage
- Born: 4 March 1761; Montreal
- Died: 29 January 1808 (aged 46); London
- Spouse: Susanna Skinner (m. 1789–1808)
- Relatives: Thomas Gage (father); Margaret Kemble (mother); William Gage, 2nd Viscount Gage (uncle)
- Military career
- Allegiance: United Kingdom
- Branch: British Army
- Service years: 1777–1808
- Rank: Major-General

Member of Parliament for Warwick
- In office 1790–1790 Serving with Lord Arden

Major-General Henry Gage, 3rd Viscount Gage (4 March 1761 – 29 January 1808) was a British Army officer, member of parliament and peer.

== Early life ==
Henry Gage was born in Montreal, the eldest son of General Thomas Gage, military leader of British Forces at the beginning of the American Revolution, and Margaret Kemble. He was educated at Westminster School.

== Military career ==
Gage joined the British Army and was made a lieutenant in the 7th Foot (Royal Fusiliers) in 1777, captain in the 26th Foot in 1779, and major in the 93rd Foot in 1783. He was subsequently promoted to brevet lieutenant-colonel in 1794, colonel in 1798 and major-general in 1805.

He was also a captain in the Sussex yeomanry (1798), a lt.-colonel in 1798 and Colonel of the South Pevensey Volunteers in 1803. He was made Lieutenant-Colonel-Commandant in 1804.

== Political career ==
He was elected Member of Parliament for Warwick from 1790 and sat until 11 October 1791, when he inherited the title Viscount Gage in the Peerage of Ireland and Baron Gage in the Peerage of Great Britain from his uncle, William Gage and was called to the House of Lords.

== Personal life ==
In 1789 he married his cousin, Susanna Maria Skinner, a descendant of the Delancey family. Both Henry and his wife shared extensive Dutch roots in British North America, including the Schuyler family and Van Cortlandt family, among others. Through his wife, Gage inherited a large part of the American estate of Vice-Admiral Sir Peter Warren (Warren was Susanna's grandfather). The historic letters and documents from this inheritance were later donated to the Sussex Archaeological Society of Lewes. They had two sons. Gage also owned slaves in Montserrat.

He died in 1808 and was succeeded by Henry Hall Gage, 4th Viscount Gage.

== See also ==
- Viscount Gage

Parliament of Great Britain
Preceded by Hon. Charles Greville; Robert Ladbroke	Member of Parliament for Warwick; 1790–1791; With: The Lord Arden	Succeeded by The Lord Arden; Hon. George Villiers
Peerage of Ireland
Preceded by William Gage	Viscount Gage; 1791–1808	Succeeded by Henry Gage
