= Sir William Gage, 7th Baronet =

British landowner, politician, and cricket patron (1695–1744)

Sir William Gage Bt
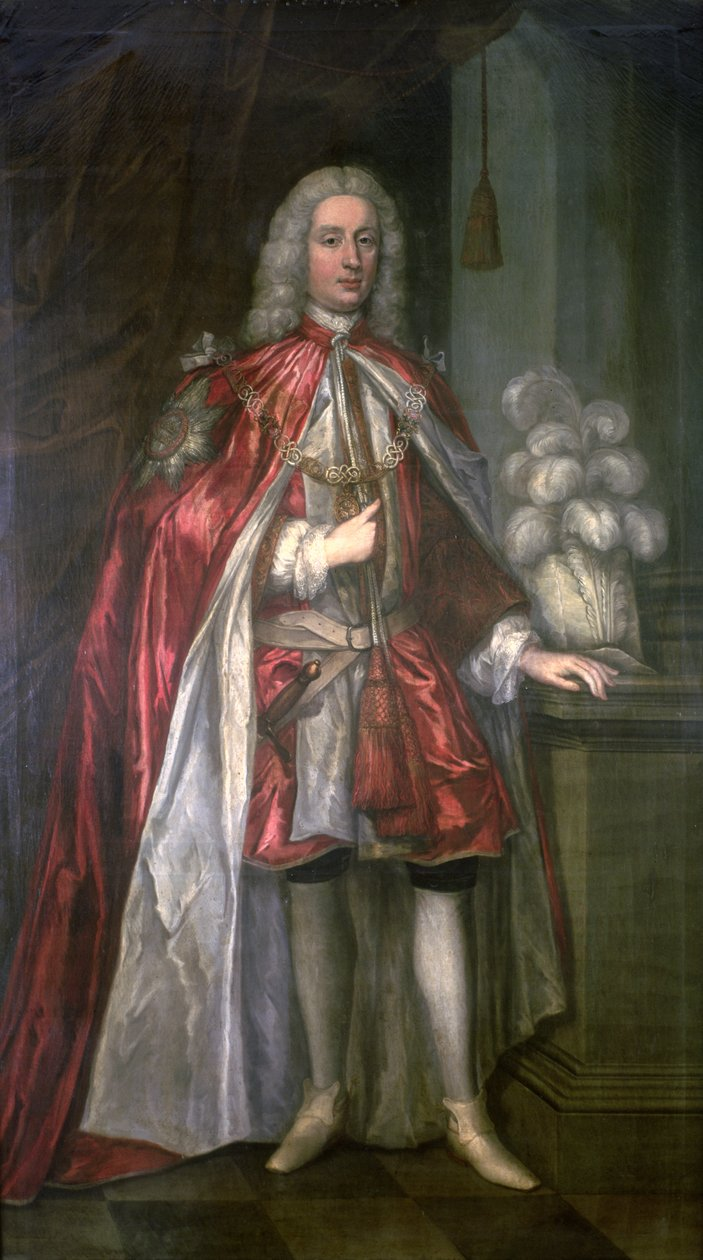
- Born: 1695; Firle, Sussex
- Died: 23 April 1744 (aged 48–49); Firle, Sussex

Sir William Gage (1695 – 23 April 1744) was a British landowner and politician who sat in the House of Commons from 1722 to 1744. He was an early patron of cricket, in association with his friend Charles Lennox, 2nd Duke of Richmond.

== Early life ==
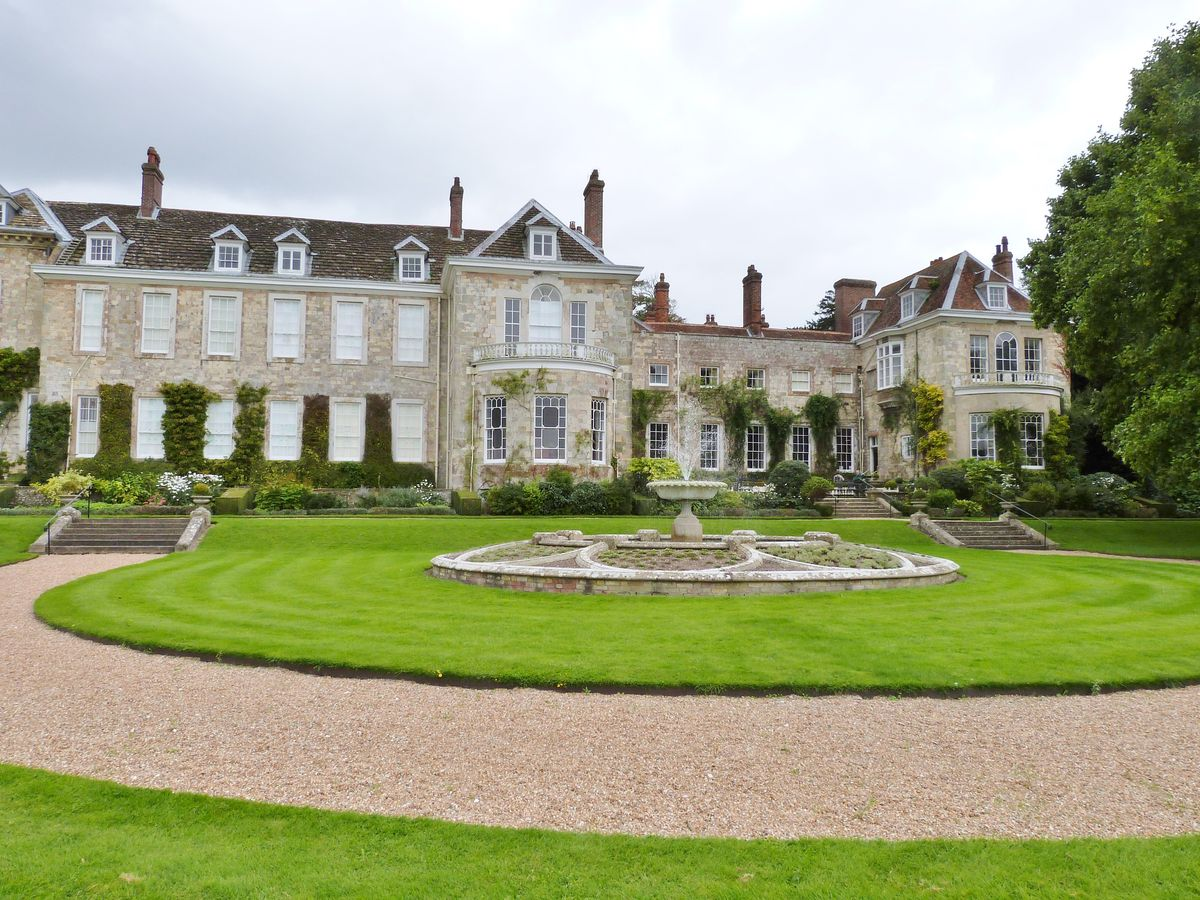
Rear view of Firle Place

Gage was born in Firle, East Sussex, the third son of Sir John Gage, 4th Baronet, and his first wife Mary Stanley, daughter of Sir William Stanley, 1st Baronet, of Hooton, Cheshire. He succeeded his brother to the Baronetcy in October 1713.

== Parliamentary career ==
The Gage family were Roman Catholic recusants but Sir William chose to conform to the established Church so that he could become an MP in 1722. His seat was the former constituency of Seaford and where he remained until his death in 1744.

== Cricket career ==
Sir William was a keen cricketer and patron who led and backed teams. His team, Sir William Gage's XI, has been credited with the earliest known innings victory. Gage was a close friend of Charles Lennox, 2nd Duke of Richmond, and it seems they had organised a number of matches before 1725 when their involvement first becomes clear through a surviving letter that Gage wrote to Richmond in humorous terms about cricket:

My Lord Duke,
I received this moment your Grace's letter and am extremely happy your Grace intends us ye honour of making one a Tuesday, and will without fail bring a gentleman with me to play against you, One that has played very seldom for these several years.
I am in great affliction with being shamefully beaten Yesterday, the first match I played this year. However I will muster up all my courage against Tuesday's engagement. I will trouble your Grace with nothing more than that I wish you Success in everything except ye Cricket Match and that I am etc. etc.
W. Gage
Firle July ye 16th 1725

Sir William's name appears in connection with a number of matches over the next few years. A game against Edwin Stead's XI on 28 August 1729 is regarded as the earliest innings victory on record. Sir William's team included players from the counties of Hampshire and Surrey, besides Sussex, and is known as Hampshire, Surrey & Sussex in the records. A contemporary report says they "got (within three) in one hand, as the former did in two hands, so the Kentish men threw it up". Sir William was greatly assisted by the outstanding play of Thomas Waymark "who turned the scale of victory".

In August 1733, Sir William Gage's XI played Frederick, Prince of Wales' XI at Moulsey Hurst for "a wager of 100 guineas". Sir William was officially Lord Gage by then. The result of the match is unknown but it featured "11 of the best players in the county on each team". In September 1734, Gage's Sussex played Kent, led by Lord John Philip Sackville, in the earliest match recorded at Sevenoaks Vine. This was won by Kent. Apart from one minor fixture a few years later, that is the last record of Sir William in a cricketing context.

== Death and legacy ==
Gage was unmarried and died without issue aged 49 on 23 April 1744. He was succeeded in the Baronetcy by his cousin Thomas Gage who, in 1754, was raised to the Peerage of Ireland as Viscount Gage.

== Bibliography ==
- Marshall, John (1961). The Duke Who Was Cricket. London: Frederick Muller Ltd. OCLC 11214571.
- McCann, Tim (2004). Sussex Cricket in the Eighteenth Century (PDF). Vol. 88. Lewes: West Sussex Record Office. ISBN 978-08-54450-55-8.
- Waghorn, H. T. (2005) [1906]. The Dawn of Cricket. London: J. W. McKenzie. ISBN 978-09-47821-17-3.

Parliament of Great Britain
| Preceded by George Naylor; Henry Pelham | Member of Parliament for Seaford; 1727–1744; With: Sir Philip Yorke 1722–33; William Hay 1734–44 | Succeeded by William Hay; William Hall Gage |
Baronetage of England
| Preceded by Thomas Gage | Baronet (of Firle Place); 1713–1744 | Succeeded by Thomas Gage |
