= Firle Escarpment =

Coordinates: 50.832°N 0.089°E

- Site of Special Scientific Interest
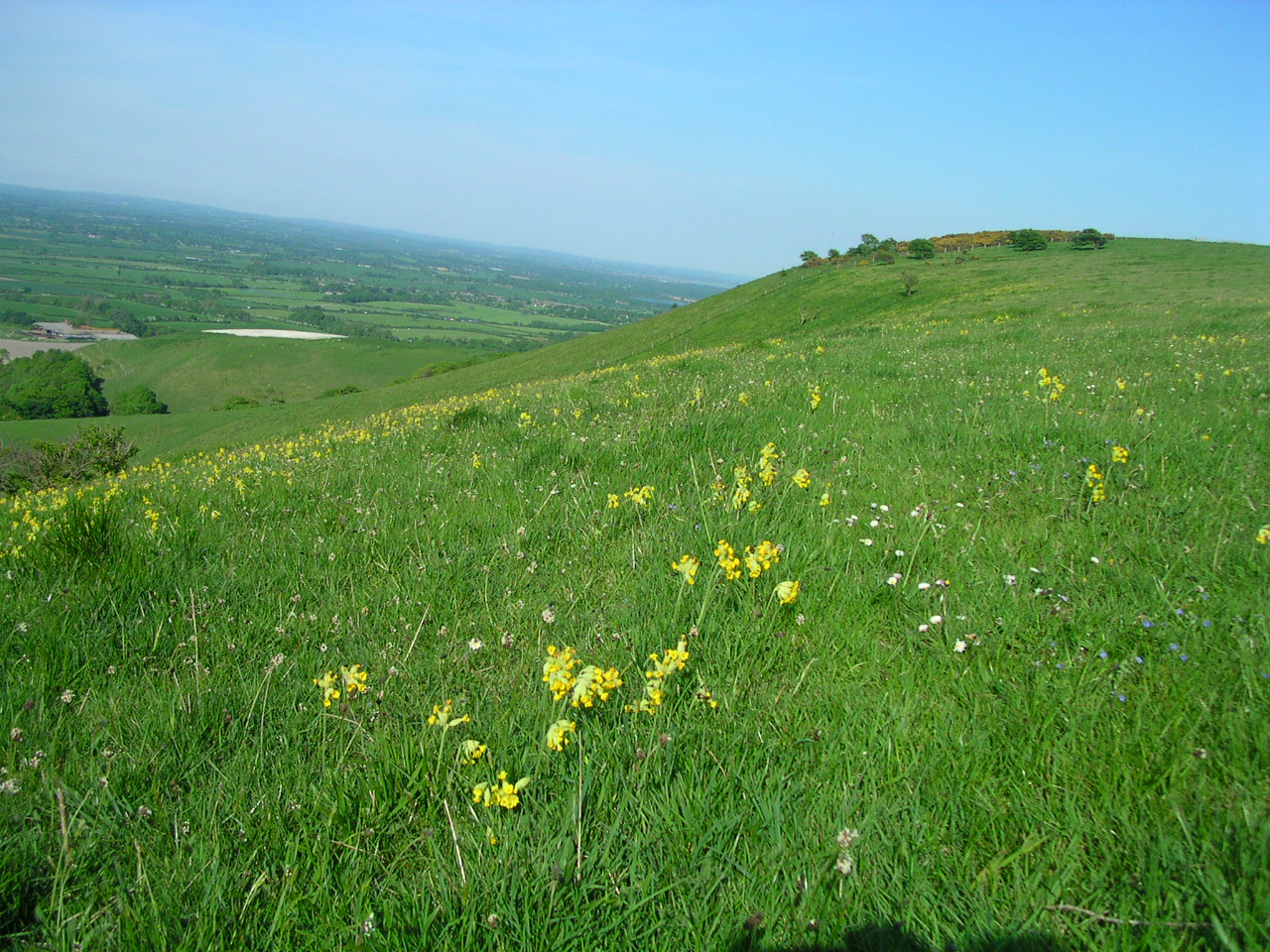
- Location of Firle Escarpment.
- Area of search: East Sussex
- Grid reference: TQ 472 057
- Interest: Biological
- Area: 302.1 hectares (747 acres)
- Notification date: 1985
- Location map: Magic Map

Firle Escarpment is a 302.1-hectare (747-acre) biological Site of Special Scientific Interest north of Seaford in East Sussex.

This is a long stretch of chalk grassland on north facing slopes of the South Downs. Flora include the very rare early spider orchid and other unusual flowering plants such as pyramidal orchid, felwort, common spotted orchid, round headed rampion, clove pink and bee orchid.
