= Thomas Gage =

British Army officer and colonial administrator (1718/19–1787)

General The Honourable Thomas Gage
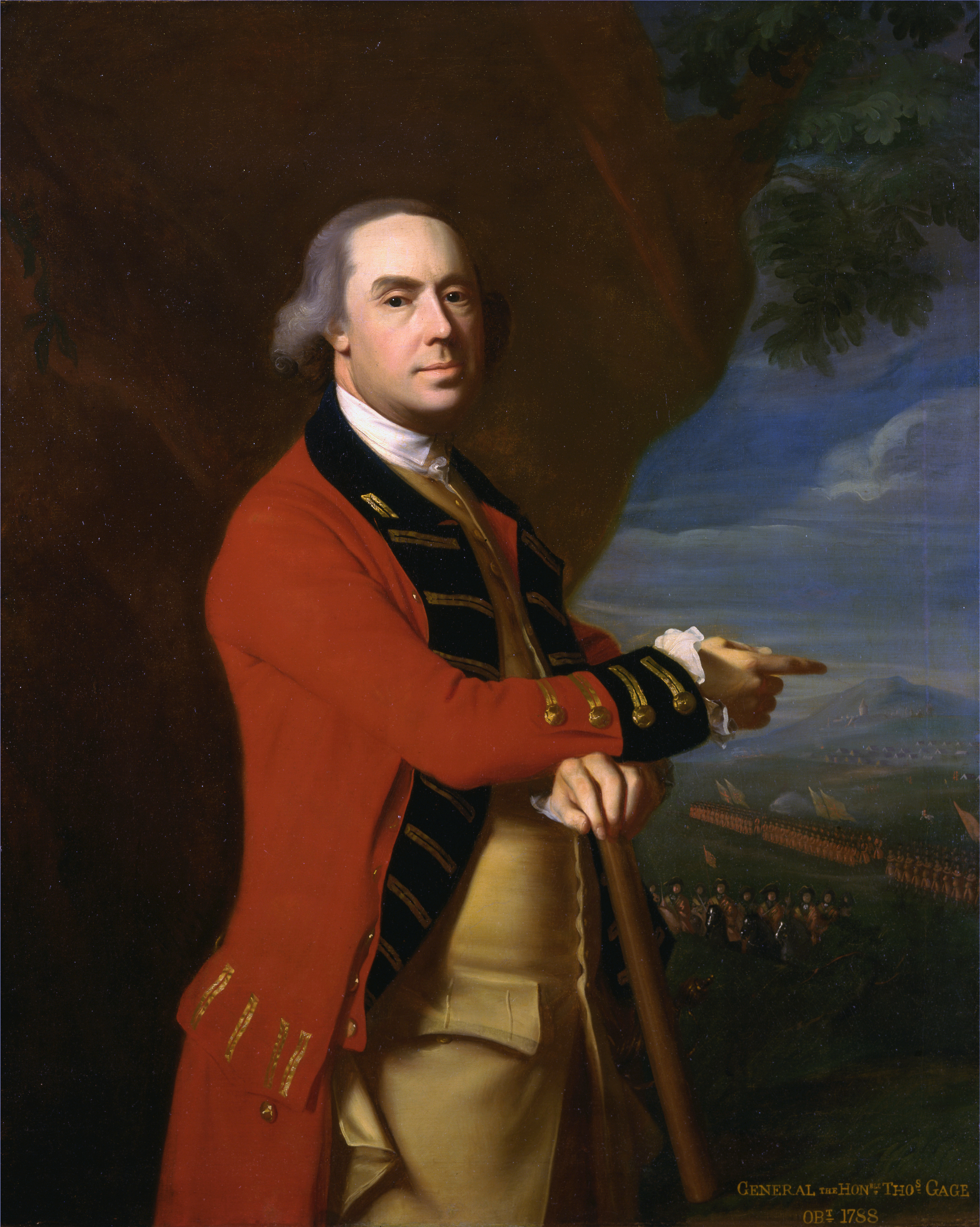
- Portrait of Thomas Gage by John Singleton Copley, c. 1768

13th Governor of the Province of Massachusetts Bay
- In office 13 May 1774 – 11 October 1775
- Monarch: George III
- Preceded by: Thomas Hutchinson
- Succeeded by: Governor's Council (acting); John Hancock (as Governor of Massachusetts)

Commander-in-Chief, North America
- In office September 1763 – June 1775
- Monarch: George III
- Preceded by: Jeffery Amherst
- Succeeded by: Frederick Haldimand

Military Governor of Quebec
- In office 1760–1763
- Preceded by: François-Pierre Rigaud de Vaudreuil
- Succeeded by: Ralph Burton

Personal details
- Born: 10 March 1718/19 Firle, Sussex, England
- Died: 2 April 1787 (aged 67–68) Portland Place, London, England
- Spouse: Margaret Kemble Gage (m. 1758)
- Profession: Military officer; official

Military service
- Allegiance: Great Britain
- Branch/service: British Army
- Years of service: 1741–1775; 1781–1782
- Rank: General
- Commands: 80th Regiment of Light-Armed Foot; Military governor of Montreal; Commander-in-Chief, North America
- Battles/wars: War of the Austrian Succession; Battle of Fontenoy; Battle of Lauffeld; Jacobite rising of 1745; Battle of Culloden; French and Indian War; Braddock Expedition; Battle of the Monongahela (WIA); Louisbourg Expedition; Battle of Carillon (WIA); Pontiac's War; American War of Independence; Battles of Lexington and Concord; Siege of Boston; Battle of Bunker Hill

General Thomas Gage (10 March 1718/19 – 2 April 1787) was a British Army officer and colonial administrator best known for his many years of service in North America, including serving as Commander-in-Chief, North America during the early days of the American Revolution.

Being born into an aristocratic family in England, he entered the Army and saw action in the French and Indian War, where Gage served alongside his future opponent George Washington in the 1755 Battle of the Monongahela. After the successful Montreal campaign in 1760, he was named military governor of the region. During this time Gage did not distinguish himself militarily, but proved himself to be a competent administrator.

From 1763 to 1775, he served as commander-in-chief of British forces in North America, overseeing Britain's response to the outbreak of Pontiac's War in 1763. In 1774, Gage was also appointed the military governor of the Province of Massachusetts Bay, with instructions to implement the Intolerable Acts, punishing Massachusetts for the Boston Tea Party. His attempts to seize the military stores of Patriot militias in April 1775 sparked the battles of Lexington and Concord, beginning the American War of Independence. After Britain's pyrrhic victory in the Battle of Bunker Hill in June, he was replaced by General William Howe in October 1775, and returned to England where he died in 1787.

== Early life ==
Thomas Gage was born on 10 March 1718/19 at Firle and christened 31 March 1719 at Westminster St James, Middlesex, England, son of Thomas Gage, 1st Viscount Gage, and Benedicta Maria Teresa Hall. Firle Place, Firle, Sussex, is where the Gage family had been seated since the 15th century. His father, Thomas Gage, 1st Viscount Gage, was a noted nobleman given titles in Ireland. Thomas Gage (the elder) had three children, of whom Thomas was the second. The first son, William Hall Gage, 2nd Viscount Gage, was born 6 January 1717/18 and christened 29 January 1717/18, also at Westminster St James. In 1728 Gage began attending the prestigious Westminster School where he met such figures as John Burgoyne, Richard Howe, Francis Bernard, and George Germain. Despite the family's long history of Catholicism, Viscount Gage had adopted the Anglican Church in 1715, likely because he wanted to stand for Parliament. During his school years Thomas the younger became firmly attached to the latter church; he eventually developed a dislike for the Roman Catholic Church that became evident in later years.

After he left Westminster School in 1736, there are no records of Gage's activities until he joined the British Army, eventually receiving a commission as ensign. His early duties consisted of recruiting in Yorkshire. In January 1741 he purchased a lieutenant's commission in the 1st Northampton Regiment, where he stayed until May 1742, when he transferred to Battereau's Regiment with the rank of captain-lieutenant. Gage received promotion to captain in 1743, and saw action in the War of the Austrian Succession with British forces in Flanders, where he served as aide-de-camp to the Earl of Albemarle in the Battle of Fontenoy. He saw further service in the Second Jacobite Uprising, which culminated in the 1746 Battle of Culloden. From 1747 to 1748, Gage saw action under Albemarle in the Low Countries. In 1748 he purchased a major's commission and transferred to the 55th Foot Regiment (which was later renumbered to the 44th). The regiment was stationed in Ireland from 1748 to 1755; Gage was promoted to lieutenant colonel in March 1751.

During his early service years, he spent leisure time at White's Club, where he was a member, and occasionally travelled, going at least as far as Paris. He was a popular figure in the army and at the club, even though he neither liked alcohol nor gambled very much. His friendships spanned class and ability. Charles Lee once wrote to Gage, "I respected your understanding, lik'd your manners and perfectly ador'd the qualities of your heart." Gage also made some important political connections, forming relationships with important figures like Lord Barrington, the future Secretary at War, and Jeffery Amherst, a man roughly his age who rose to great heights in the French and Indian War.

In 1750, Gage became engaged to a "lady of rank and fortune, whom he persuaded to yield her hand in an honourable way". The engagement was eventually broken, leaving Gage broken-hearted. In 1753, both Gage and his father stood for seats in Parliament. Both lost in the April 1754 election even though his father had earlier been an MP for some years, having decided not to respond to the threats of voters only to vote for candidates who promised to give £1,500 towards road repairs. They both contested the results, but his father died soon after, and Gage withdrew his protest in early 1755, as his regiment was being sent to America following the outbreak of the French and Indian War.

== French and Indian War ==
In 1755 Gage's regiment was sent to North America as part of General Edward Braddock's expeditionary force, whose objective was the expulsion of French forces from the Ohio Country, territory disputed between French and British colonies where there had been military clashes in 1754. On this expedition Gage's regiment was in the vanguard of the troops when they came upon a company of French and First Nations people who were trying to set up an ambush. This skirmish began the Battle of the Monongahela, in which Braddock was mortally wounded, and George Washington distinguished himself for his courage under fire and his leadership in organising the retreat. The commander of the 44th, Colonel Sir Peter Halkett, was one of many officers killed in the battle and Gage, who temporarily took command of the regiment, was slightly wounded. The regiment was decimated, and Captain Robert Orme (General Braddock's aide-de-camp) levelled charges that poor field tactics on the part of Gage had led to the defeat; as a result of his accusations Gage was denied permanent command of the 44th Regiment. Gage and Washington maintained a somewhat friendly relationship for several years after the expedition, but distance and lack of frequent contact likely cooled the relationship. By 1770, Washington was publicly condemning Gage's actions in asserting British authority in Massachusetts.

=== Creation of the light infantry ===
In the summer of 1756 Gage served as second-in-command of a failed expedition to resupply Fort Oswego, which fell to the French while the expedition was en route. The following year, he was assigned to Captain-General John Campbell Loudoun in Halifax, Nova Scotia, where a planned expedition against Louisbourg turned back when confronted by a larger French fleet.

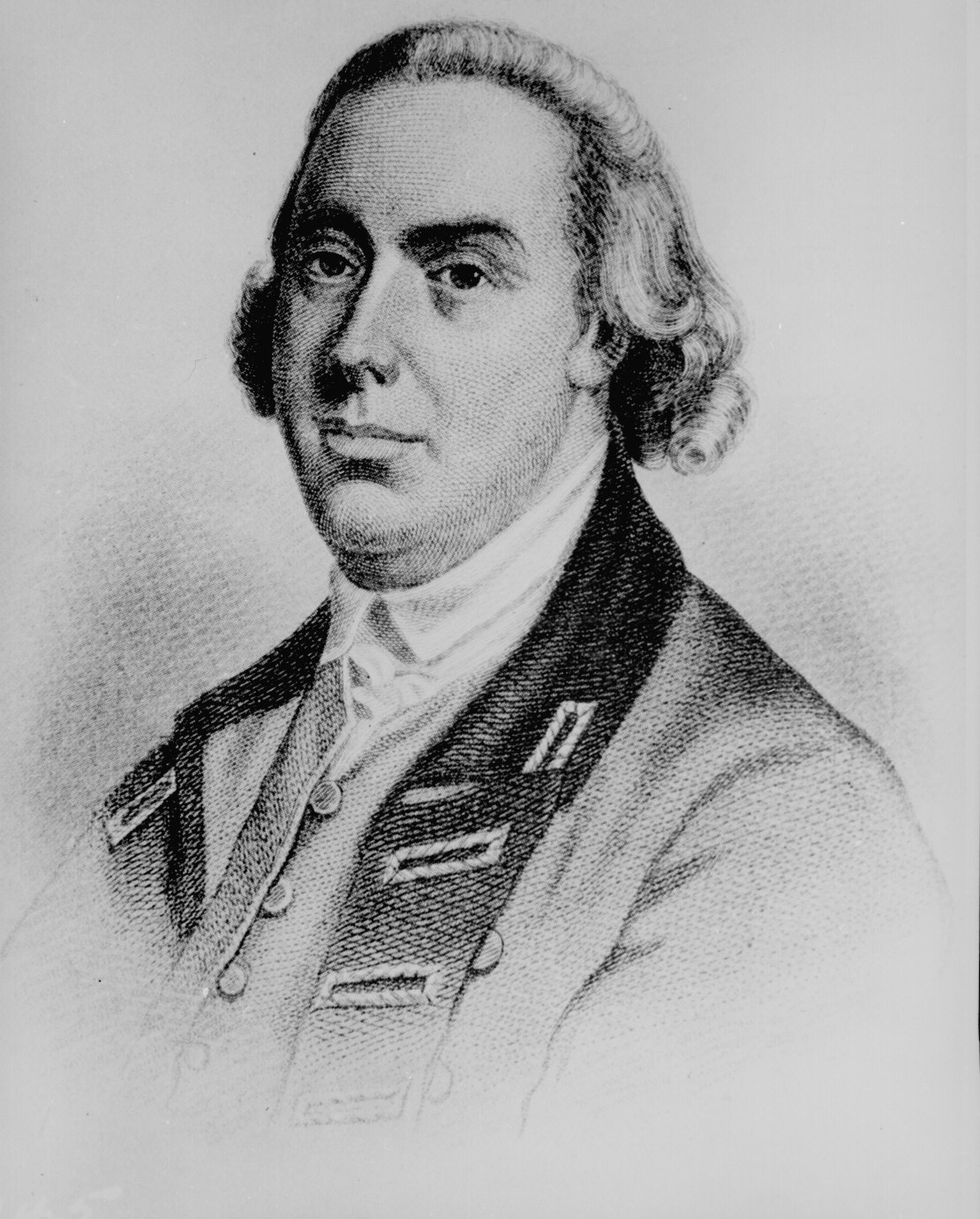
An engraved portrait of Gage

In December 1757, Gage proposed to Loudoun the creation of a regiment of light infantry that would be better suited to woodland warfare. Loudoun approved the plan before he was recalled that month, also recommending Gage to the king for promotion to full colonel. Gage spent the winter in New Jersey, recruiting for the newly raised 80th Regiment of Light-Armed Foot, the "first definitely light-armed regiment in the British army." While it is uncertain exactly when he met the Kembles, his choice of the Brunswick area may well have been motivated by his interest in Margaret Kemble, a well-known beauty of the area, a descendant of the Schuyler family, and the granddaughter of New York Mayor Stephanus Van Cortlandt. Recruiting and courtship were both successful. By February 1758 Gage was in Albany, preparing for that year's campaign, and he and Margaret were married on 8 December of that year.

The campaign for which Gage went to Albany culminated in the disastrous Battle of Carillon, in which 16,000 British forces were defeated by barely 4,000 French forces. Gage, whose regiment was in the British vanguard, was again wounded in that battle, in which the British suffered more than 2,000 casualties. Gage, who had been brevetted a brigadier general for the 1758 campaign, received in 1759 a full promotion to the position, largely through the political manoeuvring of his brother, Lord Gage.

=== Failure to act against La Galette ===
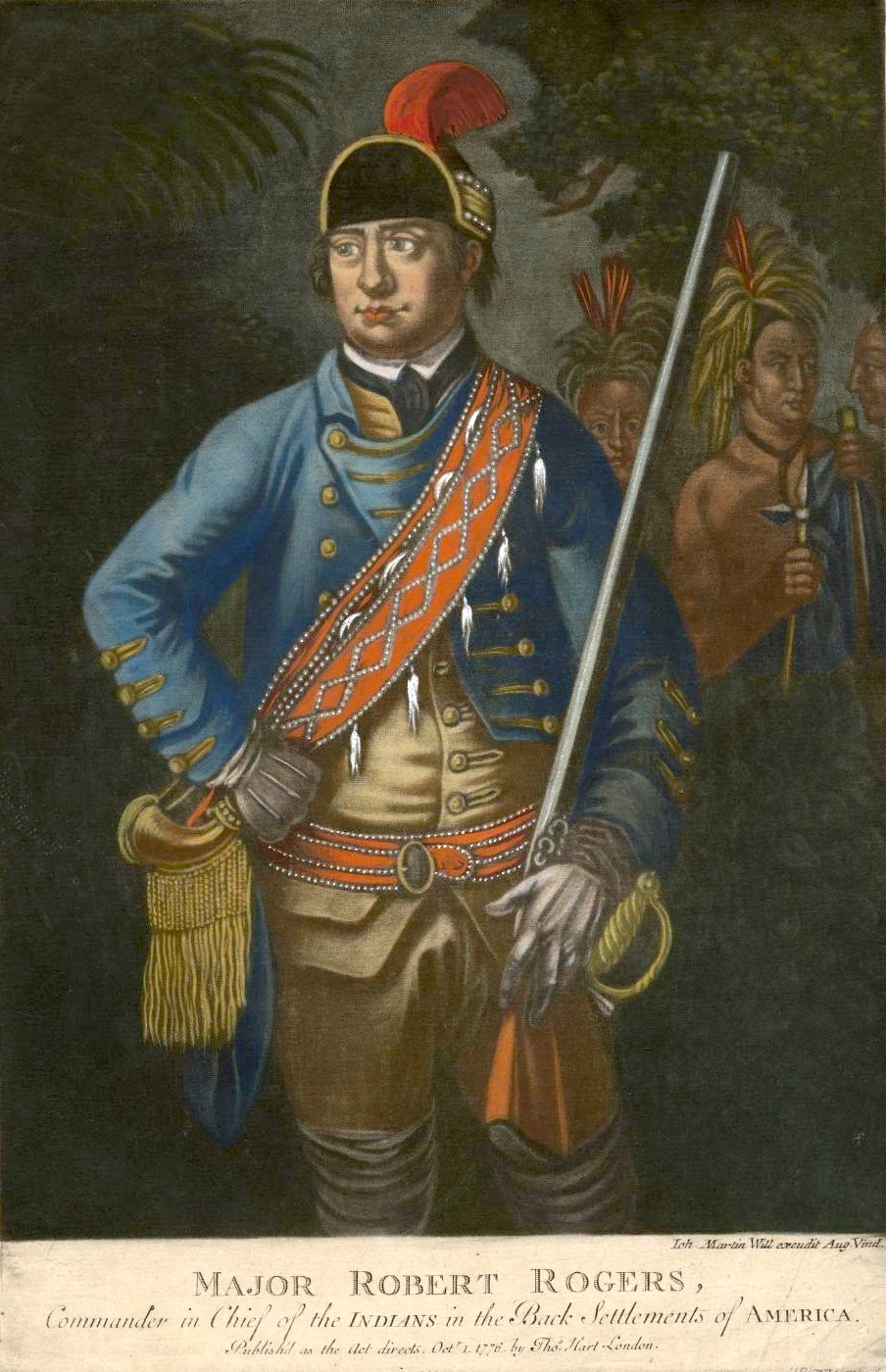
A 1776 artist's rendition of Robert Rogers, whose likeness was never made from life

The new brigadier general was placed in command of the Albany post, serving under Major General Jeffery Amherst. In 1759, shortly after capturing Ticonderoga without a fight, General Amherst learned of the death of General John Prideaux whose expedition had captured Fort Niagara. Amherst then ordered Gage to take Prideaux's place, and to take Fort de La Présentation (also known as Fort La Galette) at the mouth of the Oswegatchie River on Lake Ontario. When Amherst learned that the French had also abandoned Fort St. Frédéric, he sent a messenger after Gage with more explicit instructions to capture La Galette and then, if at all possible, to advance on Montreal.

When Gage arrived at Oswego, which had been captured in July by troops under Frederick Haldimand's command, he surveyed the situation, and decided that it was not prudent to move against La Galette. Expected reinforcements from Fort Duquesne had not arrived, the French military strength at La Galette was unknown, and its strength near Montreal was believed to be relatively high. Gage, believing an attack on La Galette would not gain any significant advantage, decided against action, and sent Amherst a message outlining his reasons. Although there was no immediate censure from either Amherst or the government, Amherst was incensed at the failure, and Gage's troops were in the rear of Amherst's army in the 1760 expedition that resulted in Montreal's surrender.

== Early governorship ==
After the French surrender, Amherst named Gage the military Governor of Montreal, a task Gage found somewhat thankless, because it involved the minute details of municipal governance along with the administration of the military occupation. He was also forced to deal with civil litigation, and manage trade with the First Nations in the Great Lakes region, where traders disputed territorial claims, and quarrelled with the First Nations. Margaret came to stay with him in Montreal and that is where his first two children, Harry, the future 3rd Viscount Gage, and Maria Theresa, were born. In 1761, he was promoted to major general, and in 1762, again with the assistance of his brother, was placed in command of the 22nd Regiment, which assured a command even in peacetime.

By all accounts, Gage appeared to be a fair administrator, respecting people's lives and property, although he had a healthy distrust of the landowning seigneurs and of the Roman Catholic clergy, who he viewed as intriguers for the French. When peace was announced following the 1763 Treaty of Paris, Gage began lobbying for another posting, as he was "very much [tired] of this cursed Climate, and I must be bribed very high to stay here any longer". In October 1763 the good news arrived that he would act as commander-in-chief of North America while Amherst was on leave in Britain. He immediately left Montreal, and took over Amherst's command in New York on 17 November 1763. When he did so, he inherited the job of dealing with the outbreak of Pontiac's War.

=== Pontiac's War ===
Following the conquest of New France, Amherst, who had little respect for the First Nations, instituted policies that severely hampered Anglo-Indian relations, principally forbidding the sale of ammunition to them. Combined with widespread concern about British expansion into their territories, this prompted the tribes of the Ohio Country and the formerly French Pays d'en Haut to rise against the British. In May 1763, under the leadership of the Odawa leader Pontiac, they launched a series of attacks on lightly garrisoned British frontier forts, successfully driving the British from some, threatening others, and also terrorising British settlers in those areas.

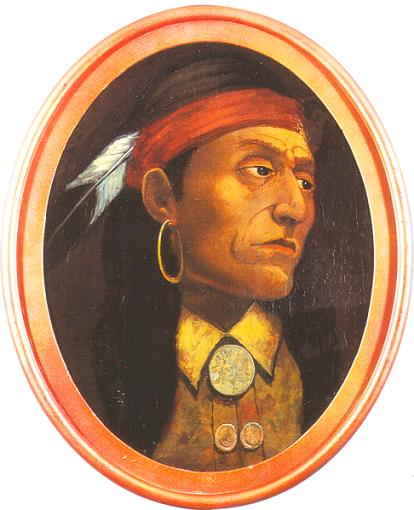
An artistic interpretation of Pontiac by John Mix Stanley. No authentic images of the chief are known to exist.

Hoping to end the conflict diplomatically, Gage ordered Colonel John Bradstreet and Colonel Henry Bouquet out on military expeditions and also ordered Sir William Johnson to engage in peace negotiations. Johnson negotiated the Treaty of Fort Niagara in the summer of 1764 with some of the disaffected tribes, and Colonel Bouquet negotiated a cease-fire of sorts in October 1764, which resulted in another peace treaty finalised by Johnson in 1765. In 1765, the 42nd Regiment of Foot finally got through to Fort Cavendish, the last fort still in French hands. The conflict was not fully resolved until Pontiac himself travelled to Fort Ontario and signed a formal treaty with Johnson in July 1766.

=== Securing his position ===
When General Amherst left North America in 1763, it was on a leave of absence from his position as commander-in-chief. In 1764, Amherst announced that he had no intention of returning to North America, at which point Gage's appointment to that post was made permanent. (Amherst retained posts as governor of Virginia and colonel of the 60th Foot, positions he only gave up in 1768 when he was required to actually go to Virginia or give up the post.) Intrigues of other high-ranking officers, especially Robert Monckton and his supporters, for his offices, continued throughout his tenure as commander-in-chief. Gage was promoted to lieutenant general in 1771. In 1767 Gage ordered the arrest of Major Robert Rogers, the former leader of Rogers' Rangers who Gage had come to dislike and distrust during the war. The arrest was based on flimsy evidence that Rogers might have been engaging in a treasonous relationship with the French; he was acquitted in a 1768 court martial.

Gage spent most of his time as commander-in-chief, the most powerful office in British America, in and around New York City. Although Gage was burdened by the administrative demands of managing a territory that spanned the entirety of North America east of the Mississippi River, the Gages clearly relished life in New York, actively participating in the social scene. One way he did this was by joining the American Philosophical Society in 1768 through his election. Although his position gave him the opportunity to make financial arrangements that might have lined the pockets of high-ranking officers at the expense of the military purse, there is little evidence that he engaged in any significant improper transactions. In addition to the handsome sum of £10 per day as commander-in-chief, he received a variety of other stipends, including his colonel's salary, given for leading his regiment. These funds made it possible to send all of the Gage children (at least six of whom survived to adulthood) to school in England.

If Gage did not dip his hand unnecessarily in the public till, he did engage in the relatively common practices of nepotism and political favouritism. In addition to securing advantageous positions for several people named Gage or Kemble, he also apparently assisted in the placement of some of his friends and political supporters, or their children.

=== Rising colonial tension ===
During Gage's administration, political tensions rose throughout the American colonies. As a result, Gage began withdrawing troops from the frontier to fortify urban centres like New York City and Boston. As the number of soldiers stationed in cities grew, the need to provide adequate food and housing for these troops became urgent. Parliament passed the Quartering Act of 1765, permitting British troops to be quartered in vacant houses, barns, and outbuildings, but not private residences.

Gage's thoughts on the reasons for colonial unrest played an important role in furthering the unrest. He at first believed that the popular unrest after the 1765 Stamp Act was primarily due to a small number of colonial elites, led by those in Boston. In 1768 he recommended the deployment of two regiments to occupy Boston, a move that further inflamed the city. Among the troops quartered in the city was the 29th Regiment of Foot, which had previously clashed with colonists in Quebec and New York, and had a reputation for poor discipline. This occupation eventually led to the Boston Massacre in 1770. Later that year he wrote that "America is a mere bully, from one end to the other, and the Bostonians by far the greatest bullies."

Gage later came to change his opinion about the source of the unrest, believing that democracy was a significant threat. He saw the movement of colonists into the interior, beyond effective Crown control, and the development of the town meeting as a means of local governance, as major elements of the threat, and wrote in 1772 that "democracy is too prevalent in America". He believed that town meetings should be abolished and recommended that colonisation should be limited to the coastal areas where British rule could be enforced.

== Governor of Massachusetts Bay ==
Gage returned to Britain in June 1773 with his family and thus missed the Boston Tea Party in December of that year. The British Parliament reacted to the Tea Party with a series of punitive measures against Massachusetts known in the colonies as the Intolerable Acts. Some of the terms of those acts, for example the option to remove political trials to England, originated with Gage, and measures such as curbing the activities of town meetings and withholding representative government from the Ohio Country also show his influence. With his military experience and relative youth (Massachusetts governor Thomas Hutchinson was then 62 years old and unpopular, and the equally unpopular lieutenant governor Andrew Oliver was 67 in 1773 and died in March 1774), Gage, a popular figure on both sides of the Atlantic, was deemed the best man to handle the brewing crisis and enforce the Parliamentary acts.

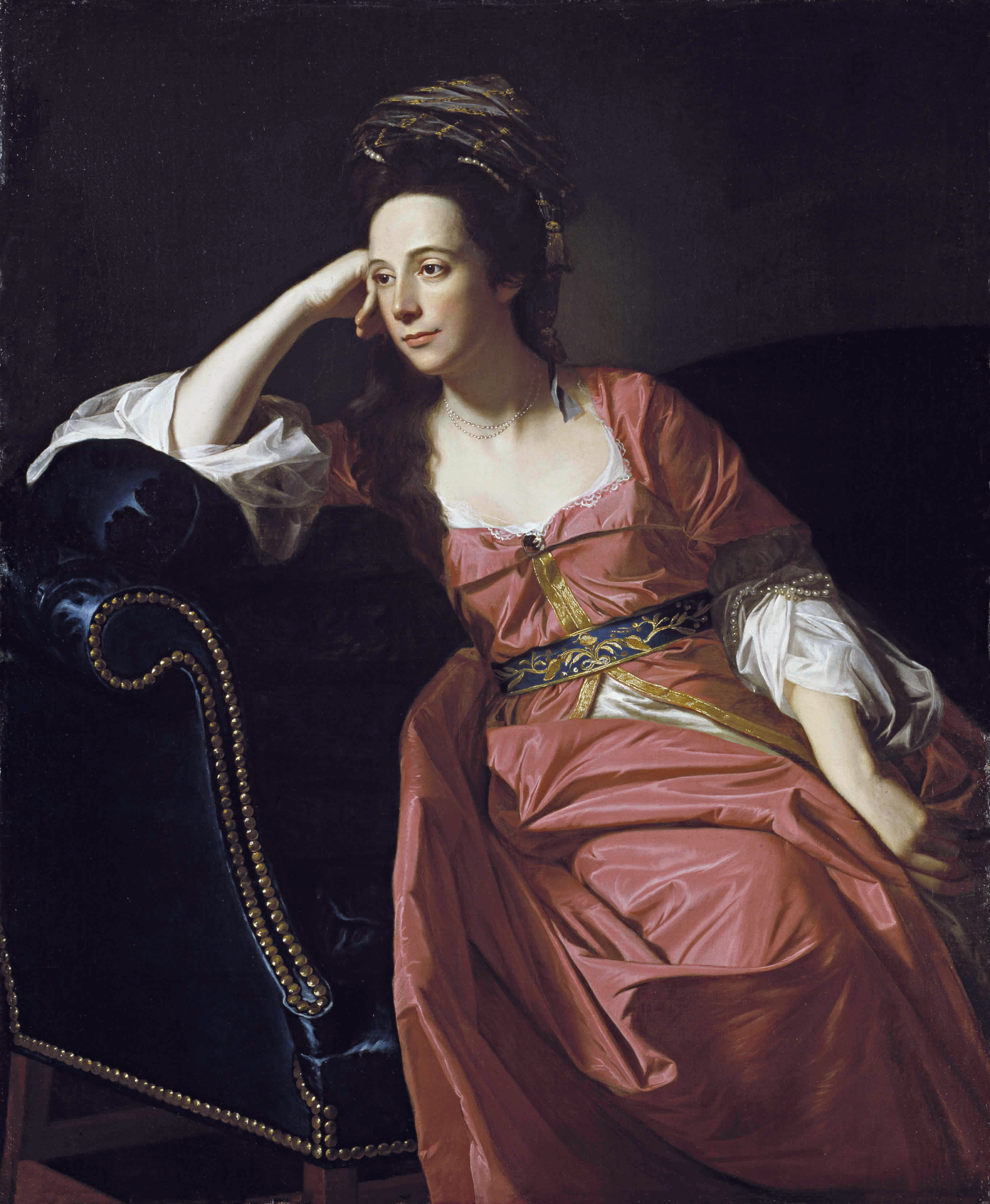
c. 1771 portrait of Margaret Kemble Gage. She was suspected by some of her contemporaries and by later historians of harbouring sympathies for the Patriot cause, and of supplying intelligence to Patriot leaders.

In early 1774, he was appointed military governor of Massachusetts, replacing Hutchinson. He arrived from Britain in early May, first stopping at Castle William on Castle Island in Boston Harbour. He then arrived in Boston on 13 May 1774, having been carried there by HMS Lively. His arrival was met with little pomp and circumstance, but was generally well received at first as Bostonians were happy to see Hutchinson go. Local attitudes toward him rapidly deteriorated as he began implementing the various acts, including the Boston Port Act, which put many people out of work, and the Massachusetts Government Act, which formally rescinded the provincial assembly's right to nominate members of the Governor's Council, though it retained the elected General Court. Gage dissolved the assembly in June 1774 after he discovered the Massachusetts representatives were sending delegates to the extralegal Continental Congress. He called for new elections to be held as per the Massachusetts Government Act, but his authority was undermined by the representatives who refused to meet with the new, appointed Governor's Council. He attempted to buy off political leaders in Massachusetts, notably Benjamin Church and Samuel Adams. With the former he was successful—Church secretly supplied him with intelligence on the activities of rebel leaders—but Adams and other rebel leaders were not moved.

In September 1774 Gage withdrew his garrisons from New York City, New Jersey, Philadelphia, Halifax and Newfoundland and brought all under his wing in Boston together with a large British naval presence under the control of Admiral Samuel Graves. He also sought to strictly enforce army directives calling for the confiscation of war-making materials. In September 1774, he ordered a mission to remove provincial gunpowder from a magazine in what is now Somerville, Massachusetts. This action, although successful, caused a huge popular reaction known as the Powder Alarm, resulting in the mobilization of thousands of provincial militiamen who marched towards Cambridge, Massachusetts. Although the militia soon dispersed, the show of force on the part of the provincials had a lasting effect on Gage, and he subsequently grew more cautious in his actions. The rapid response of the provincials was in large part due to Paul Revere and the Sons of Liberty. The Sons of Liberty kept careful watch over Gage's activities and successfully warned others of future actions before Gage could mobilise his British regulars to execute them. A Committee of Safety was also tasked with sounding the alarm for local militias if Gage were spotted sending significant numbers of British troops outside of Boston.

Gage was criticised for allowing groups like the Sons of Liberty to exist. One of his officers, Lord Percy, remarked, "The general's great lenity and moderation serve only to make them [the colonists] more daring and insolent." Gage himself wrote after the Powder Alarm, "If force is to be used at length, it must be a considerable one, and foreign troops must be hired, for to begin with small numbers will encourage resistance, and not terrify; and will in the end cost more blood and treasure." Edmund Burke described Gage's conflicted relationship by saying in Parliament, "An Englishman is the unfittest person on Earth to argue another Englishman into slavery."

== American War of Independence ==
On 14 April 1775 Gage received orders from London to take decisive action against the Patriots. Given intelligence that the militia had been stockpiling weapons at Concord, Massachusetts, he ordered detachments of regulars from the Boston garrison to march there on the night of 18 April to confiscate them. A brief skirmish in Lexington scattered colonial militia forces gathered there, but in a later standoff in Concord, a portion of the British force was routed by a stronger colonial militia contingent. When the British left Concord following their search (which was largely unsuccessful, as the colonists, with advance warning of the action, had removed most of the supplies), arriving colonial militia engaged the British column in a running battle back to Charlestown. The Battles of Lexington and Concord resulted in 273 total casualties for the British and 93 for the American rebels.

The British expedition to Lexington and Concord was supposed to have been a "profound secret," but nevertheless Sons of Liberty leader Joseph Warren found out about it. He then dispatched Paul Revere and William Dawes to warn the colonists, which resulted in the Battle of Lexington and Concord, and starting the American War of Independence. Gage had told his plans to only his second-in-command and "one other person." There is evidence to suggest that the other person was his wife, Margaret Kemble Gage, who was an American, and that she may have passed on this information to Warren.

Following Lexington and Concord, thousands of colonial militia surrounded the city, beginning the Siege of Boston. At first, the rebels (led mainly by Massachusetts General Artemas Ward) faced some 4,000 British regulars, who were bottled up in the city. British Admiral Samuel Graves commanded the fleet that continued to control the harbour. On 25 May, 4,500 reinforcements arrived in the city, along with three more generals: Major General William Howe and Brigadiers John Burgoyne and Henry Clinton.

On 14 June, Gage issued a proclamation, believed to have been written by Burgoyne but distributed in Gage's name, granting a general pardon to all who would demonstrate loyalty to the crown—with the notable exceptions of John Hancock and Samuel Adams. Gage also worked with the newly arrived generals on a plan to break the grip of the besieging forces. They would use an amphibious assault to take control of the unoccupied Dorchester Heights, which would be followed up by an attack on the rebel camp at Roxbury. They would then seize the heights on the Charlestown peninsula, including Breed's Hill and Bunker Hill. This would allow the British to eventually take the colonial headquarters at Cambridge. The colonists were warned of these plans, and seized the initiative. On the night of 16–17 June, they fortified Breed's Hill, threatening the British position in Boston. On 17 June 1775, British forces under General Howe seized the Charlestown Peninsula at the Battle of Bunker Hill. It was a Pyrrhic victory; Britain won but suffered more than 1,000 casualties without significantly altering the state of the siege. Henry Clinton called it "[a] dear bought victory, another such would have ruined us", while other officers noted that nothing had been gained in the victory. Gage himself wrote the Secretary at War:

These people show a spirit and conduct against us they never showed against the French.... They are now spirited up by a rage and enthusiasm as great as ever people were possessed of and you must proceed in earnest or give the business up. A small body acting in one spot will not avail, you must have large armies making diversions on different sides, to divide their force. The loss we have sustained is greater than we can bear. Small armies cannot afford such losses, especially when the advantage gained tends to do little more than the gaining of a post.

== Return to Great Britain ==
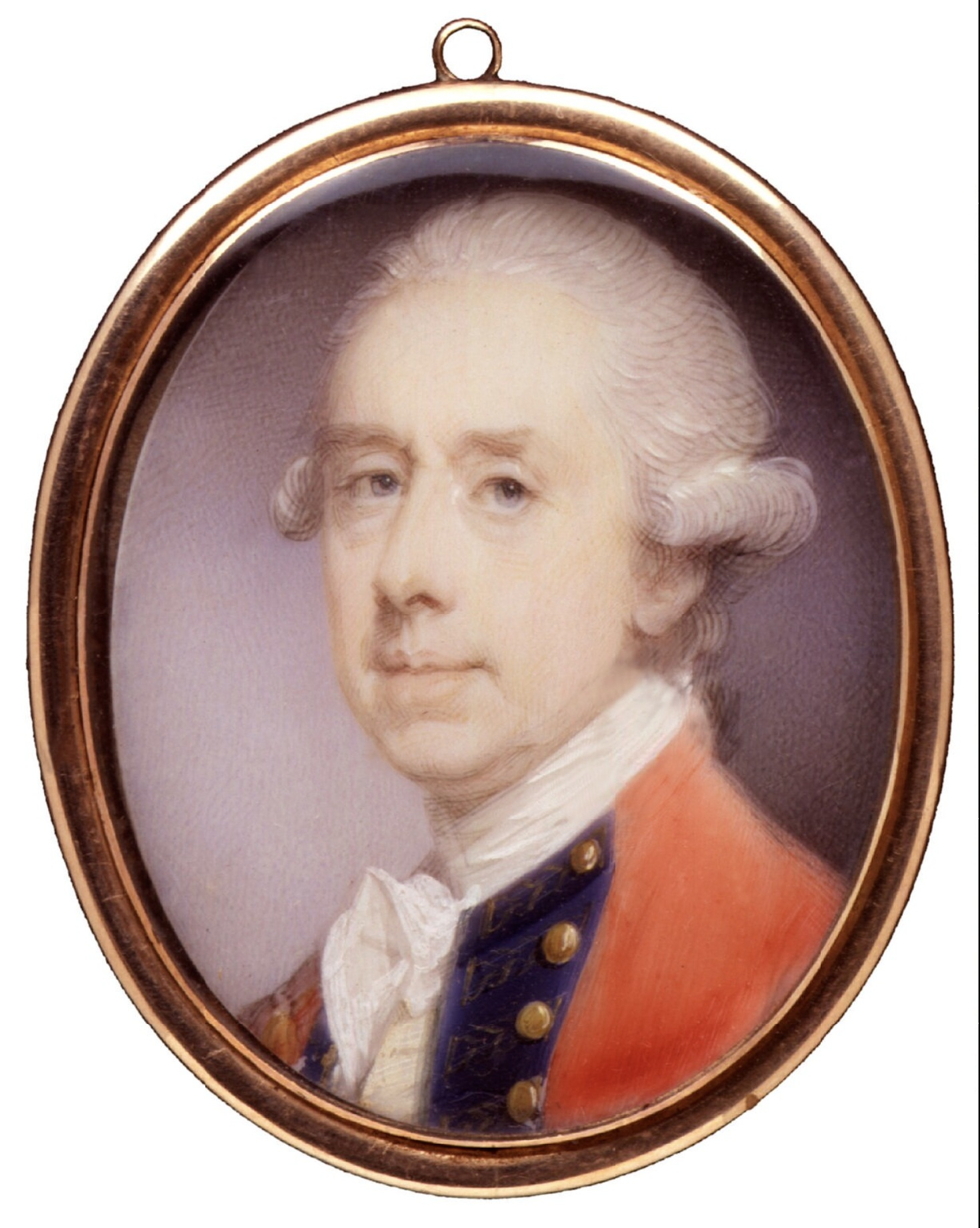
c. 1770–1780 miniature portrait of Gage by Jeremiah Meyer

On 25 June 1775, Gage wrote a dispatch to Great Britain, notifying Lord Dartmouth of the results of the battle on 17 June. Three days after his report arrived in England, Dartmouth issued the order recalling Gage and replacing him with William Howe. The rapidity of this action is likely attributable to the fact that people within the government were already arguing for Gage's removal, and the battle was just the final straw. Gage received the order in Boston on 26 September, and set sail for England on 11 October 1775.

The nature of Dartmouth's recall order did not actually strip Gage of his offices immediately. William Howe temporarily replaced him as commander of the forces in Boston, while General Guy Carleton was given command of the forces in Quebec. Although King George wanted to reward his "mild general" for his service, Gage's sole reward after Lord George Germain (who succeeded Dartmouth as the Secretary of State for North America) formally gave his command to Howe in April 1776 was that he retained the governorship of Massachusetts.

On the Gages' return to England, the family eventually settled into a house on Portland Place in London. Although he was presumably given a friendly reception in his interview with a sympathetic King George, the public and private writings about him and his fall from power were at times vicious. One correspondent wrote that Gage had "run his race of glory ... let him alone to the hell of his own conscience and the infamy which must inevitably attend him!" Others were kinder; New Hampshire Governor Benning Wentworth characterised him as "a good and wise man ... surrounded by difficulties."

Gage was briefly reactivated to duty in April 1781, when Amherst appointed him to mobilise troops for a possible French invasion. The next year, Gage assumed command of the 17th Light Dragoons. He was promoted to full general on 20 November 1782, and later transferred to command the 11th Dragoons.

== Final years and legacy ==
As the war machinery was reduced in the mid-1780s, Gage's military activities declined. He supported the efforts of Loyalists to recover losses incurred when they were forced to leave the colonies, notably confirming the activities of Benjamin Church to further his widow's claims for compensation. He received visitors at Portland Place and at Firle, including Frederick Haldimand and Thomas Hutchinson. His health began to decline early in the 1780s.

Gage died at Portland Place on 2 April 1787, and was buried in the family plot at Firle. His wife survived him by almost 37 years. His son Henry inherited the family title upon the death of Gage's brother William, and became one of the wealthiest men in England. His youngest son, William Hall Gage, became an admiral of the fleet in the Royal Navy, and all three daughters married into well-known families.

Gagetown, New Brunswick was named in his honour; the Canadian Forces base CFB Gagetown consequently reflects his name.

In 1792, the Lieutenant-Governor of Upper Canada, John Graves Simcoe, renamed the archipelago of islands in the mouth of the St. Lawrence River for the victorious generals of the Conquest of Canada: Wolfe Island, Amherst Island, Howe Island, Carleton Island, and Gage Island. The last is now known as Simcoe Island.

== In popular culture ==
In the 2015 miniseries Sons of Liberty, Gage is portrayed by Marton Csokas.

== Arms ==
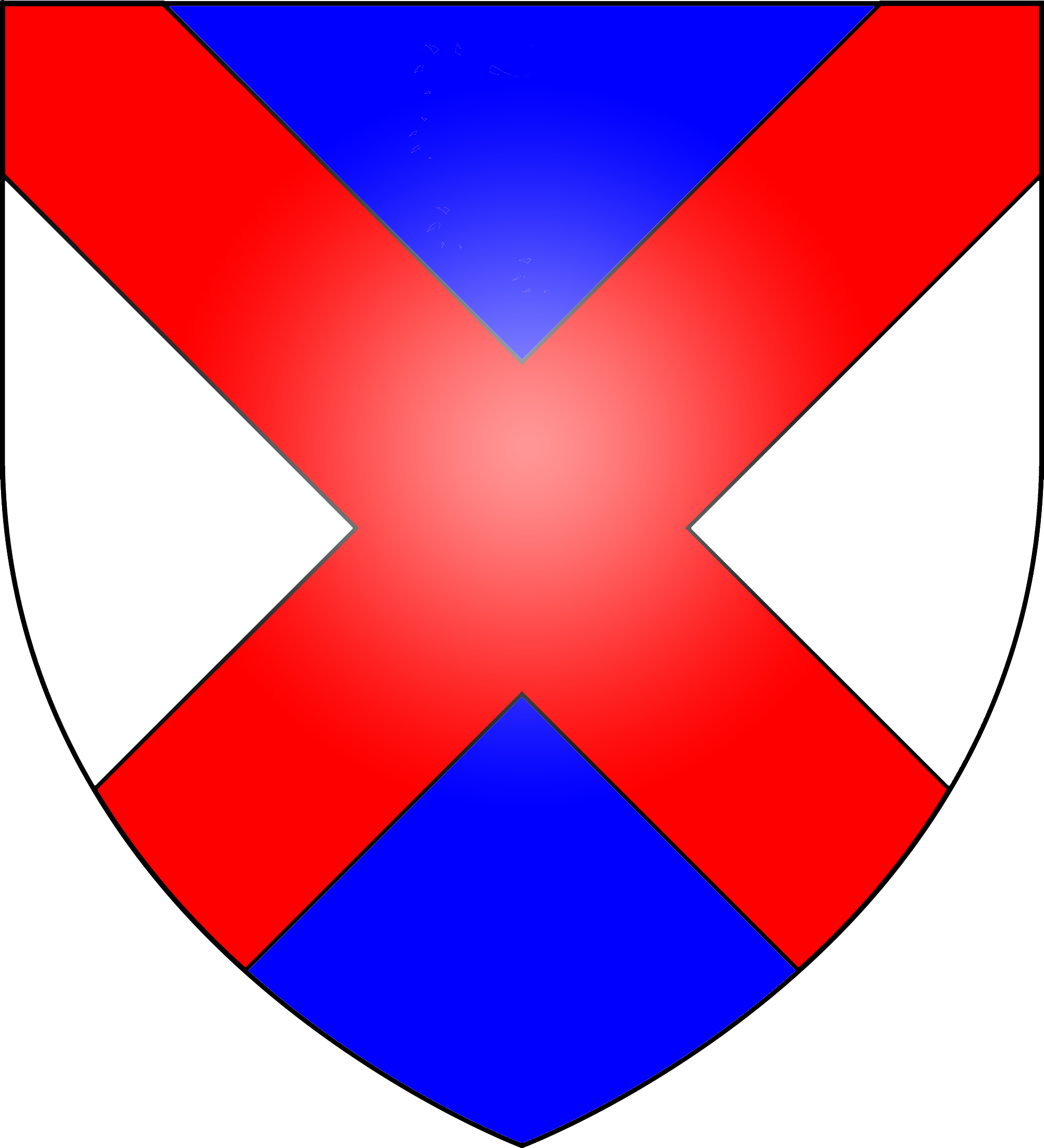

Coat of arms of Gage, baronets of Hengrave, Suffolk, England

== See also ==
- Viscount Gage

== General and cited references ==
- Alden, John Richard (1969) [1948]. General Gage in America. New York: Greenwood Press. ISBN 978-0-8371-2264-9.
- Anderson, Fred (2000). Crucible of War: The Seven Years' War and the Fate of Empire in British North America, 1754–1766. New York: Alfred Knopf. ISBN 978-0-375-40642-3. OCLC 237426391.
- Billias, George Athan (1969). George Washington's Opponents. New York: William Morrow. OCLC 11709.
- Burke, Sir Bernard; Burke, Ashworth P (1914). General and Heraldic Dictionary of the Peerage and Baronetage. London: Burke's Peerage Limited. OCLC 2790692.
- Dowd, Gregory Evans (2002). War under Heaven: Pontiac, the Indian Nations, & the British Empire. Baltimore, Maryland: Johns Hopkins University Press. ISBN 0-8018-7079-8. OCLC 464447070. ISBN 0-8018-7892-6 (paperback).
- Fischer, David Hackett (1995). Paul Revere's Ride. New York: Oxford University Press. ISBN 0-19-509831-5. OCLC 28418785.
- Hinman, Bonnie (2002). Thomas Gage: British General (paperback ed.). Philadelphia: Chelsea House. ISBN 0-7910-6385-2. OCLC 427185274.
- Ketchum, Richard (1999). Decisive Day: The Battle of Bunker Hill. New York: Owl Books. ISBN 0-385-41897-3. OCLC 24147566. (Paperback: ISBN 0-8050-6099-5)
- Sheppard, Ruth (2006). Empires Collide: The French and Indian War 1754–63. Oxford and New York: Osprey. ISBN 978-1-84603-089-5. OCLC 74811470.
- Shy, John (1990). A People Numerous and Armed: Reflections on the Military Struggle for American Independence. Ann Arbor, Michigan: University of Michigan Press. ISBN 978-0-472-09431-8. OCLC 156898252.
- Stark, James Henry (1907). The Loyalists of Massachusetts and the Other Side of the American Revolution. Boston: J. H. Stark. ISBN 978-0-7222-7679-2. OCLC 1655711.
- Stephen, Leslie, ed. (1889). "Gage, Thomas (1721–1787)" . Dictionary of National Biography. Vol. 20. London: Smith, Elder & Co. OCLC 2763972.
- Collections of the New York Historical Society for the Year 1883. New York: New York Historical Society. 1884. OCLC 1605190.

Military offices
New regiment	Commanding officer of the 80th Regiment of Light-Armed Foot; 1758–1762	Succeeded by Montagu Wilmot
Preceded by Edward Whitmore	Commanding officer of the 22nd Regiment of Foot; 1762–1782	Succeeded by Charles O'Hara
Preceded by Sir Jeffery Amherst	Commander-in-Chief, North America; 1763–1775	Succeeded by William Howe
Preceded by George Preston	Commanding officer of the 17th Regiment of (Light) Dragoons; 1782–1785	Succeeded by Earl of Lincoln
Preceded by James Johnston	Commanding officer of the 11th Regiment of (Light) Dragoons; 1785–1787	Succeeded by Sir Joseph Yorke
Government offices
Preceded by Thomas Hutchinson	Governor of Massachusetts Bay; 1774–1775	Vacant American Revolution Title next held by John Hancock as Governor of Massachusetts
