= Viscount Gage =

Title in the Peerage of Ireland

Viscountcy of Gage
- Quarterly: 1st and 4th, Per saltire Argent and Azure a Saltire Gules (Gage); 2nd and 3rd, Azure a Sun in Splendour Or (St Clere)
- Creation date: 14 September 1720
- Created by: George I
- Peerage: Peerage of Ireland
- First holder: Sir Thomas Gage, 8th Baronet
- Present holder: Henry Nicolas Gage, 8th Viscount Gage
- Heir apparent: The Hon. Henry William Gage
- Subsidiary titles: Baron Gage, of Castlebar; Baron Gage, of High Meadow; Baronet, styled "of Firle, co. Sussex"
- Status: Extant
- Seat: Firle Place

Viscount Gage, of Castle Island in the County of Kerry of the Kingdom of Ireland, is a title in the Peerage of Ireland. It was created in 1720 for Thomas Gage, along with the subsidiary title of Baron Gage, of Castlebar in the County of Mayo, also in the Peerage of Ireland. In 1744 he also succeeded his cousin as eighth Baronet, of Firle Place. The titles remain united. The Gage family descends from John Gage, who was created a baronet, of Firle Place in the County of Sussex, in the Baronetage of England on 26 March 1622. His great-grandson, the seventh Baronet, represented Seaford in Parliament. He was succeeded by his first cousin, Thomas Gage, 1st Viscount Gage, the eighth Baronet. He sat as a Member of Parliament for Minehead and Tewkesbury and also served as Governor of Barbados. In 1720, 24 years before succeeding in the baronetcy, he was raised to the Peerage of Ireland as Baron Gage and Viscount Gage. His second son was the military commander the Hon. Thomas Gage.

Lord Gage was succeeded by his eldest son, the second Viscount. He represented Seaford in the House of Commons and served for many years as Paymaster of Pensions. In 1780 he was created Baron Gage, of Firle in the County of Sussex, in the Peerage of Great Britain, with remainder to heirs male, and in 1790 he was made Baron Gage, of High Meadow in the County of Gloucester, also in the Peerage of Great Britain, with remainder to his nephew and heir presumptive Henry, the eldest son of his younger brother, the aforementioned Sir Thomas Gage. On Lord Gage's death in 1791, the barony of 1780 became extinct while he was succeeded in the barony of 1790, the baronetcy and the Irish titles by his nephew Henry, the third Viscount. He was a Major-General in the Army. As of 2010 the titles are held by his great-great-great-grandson, the eighth Viscount, who succeeded his elder brother in 1993.

The family seat is Firle Place, near Firle, East Sussex.

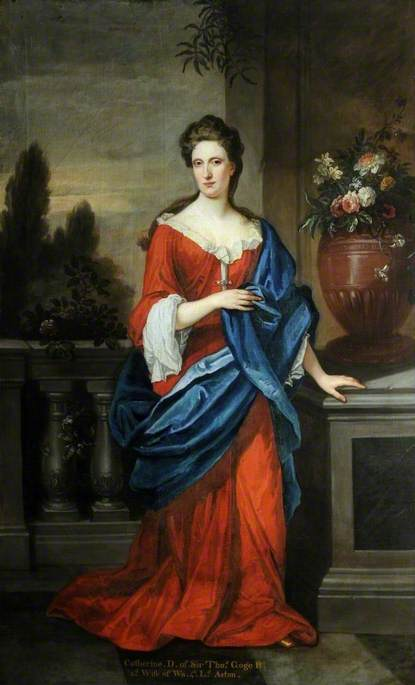
Catherine Gage, later Lady Aston, daughter of Sir Thomas Gage, 2nd Baronet

== Gage baronets, of Firle Place (1622) ==
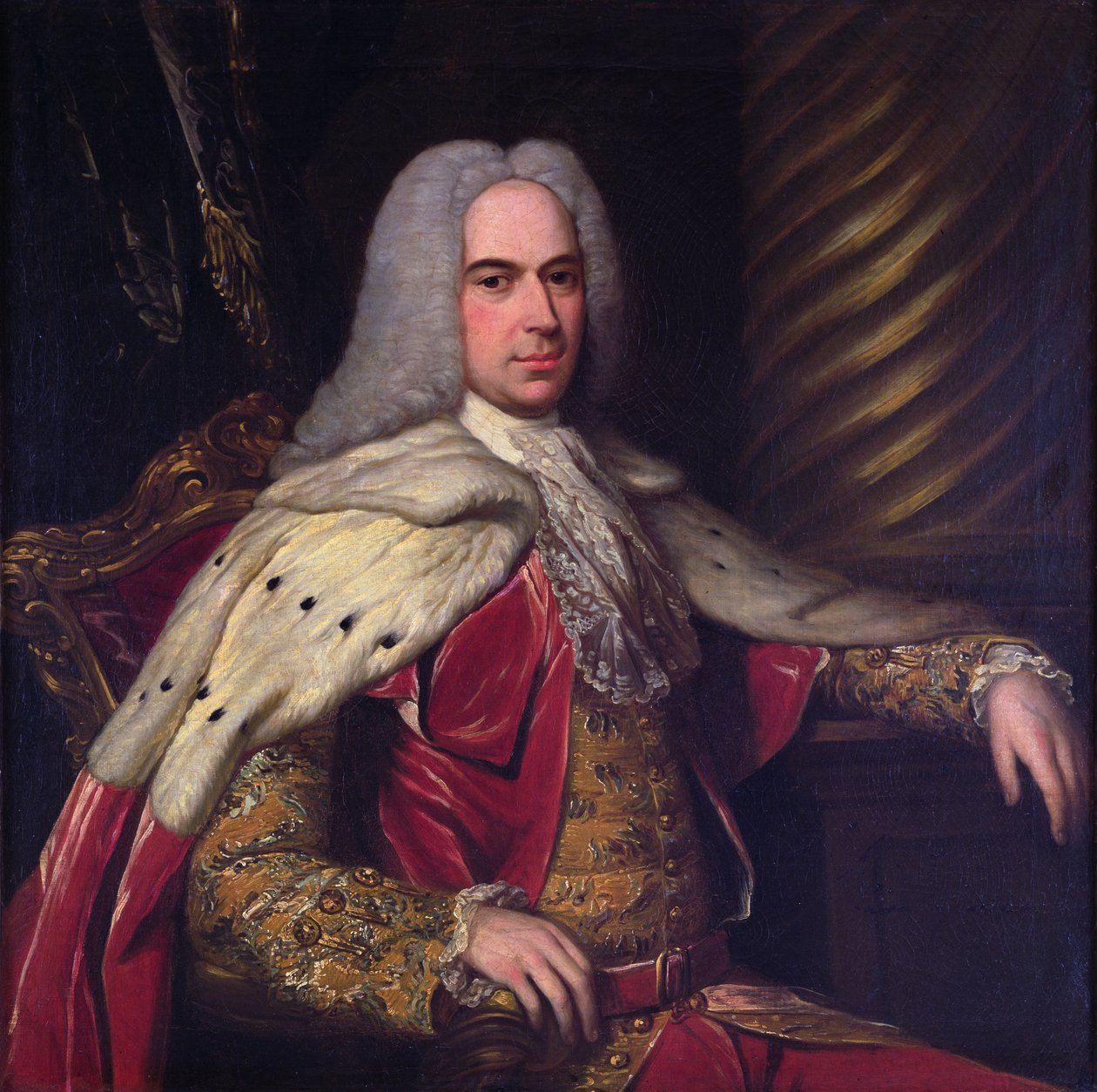
Portrait of Thomas Gage, 1st Viscount Gage

- Sir John Gage, 1st Baronet (died 1633)
- Sir Thomas Gage, 2nd Baronet (died 1654)
- Sir Thomas Gage, 3rd Baronet (died 1660)
- Sir John Gage, 4th Baronet (c. 1642–1699)
- Sir John Gage, 5th Baronet (c. 1691–1700)
- Sir Thomas Gage, 6th Baronet (c. 1694–1713)
- Sir William Gage, 7th Baronet (1695–1744)
- Sir Thomas Gage, 8th Baronet (died 1754) (had been created Viscount Gage in 1720)

== Viscounts Gage (1720) ==
- Thomas Gage, 1st Viscount Gage (died 1754)
- William Hall Gage, 2nd Viscount Gage (1718–1791)
- Henry Gage, 3rd Viscount Gage (1761–1808)
- Henry Hall Gage, 4th Viscount Gage (1791–1877)
- Henry Charles Gage, 5th Viscount Gage (1854–1912)
- Henry Rainald Gage, 6th Viscount Gage (1895–1982)
- George John St Clere Gage, 7th Viscount Gage (1932–1993)
- (Henry) Nicolas Gage, 8th Viscount Gage (born 1934)

The heir apparent is the present holder's son the Hon. Henry William Gage (born 1975).
