= Gage (surname) =

Gage is a surname. Notable people with the surname include:

== Business and industry ==
- Alfred S. Gage (1860–1928), American rancher and businessman in Texas
- Daniel Gage (1828–1901), New England ice harvester
- John Gage (born 1942), American business executive
- John Gage (disambiguation), several people

== Entertainment ==
- Ben Gage (1914–1978), American television actor
- Dave Gage, American harmonica player and instructor
- Kevin Gage (born 1958), American actor
- Mary Leona Gage, Miss USA 1957
- Patricia Gage, British actress
- Pierre Gage, Quebec musician
- Ryan Gage, actor

== Fictional characters ==
- Francis Gage, portrayed by Judson Mills, a rookie Texas Ranger and main character in the American crime drama series, Walker, Texas Ranger.
- John Roderick "Johnny" Gage, portrayed by Randolph Mantooth, main character of the American medical drama series, Emergency!
- Detective Mike Gage, main character from the 1998 American horror film Strangeland.

== Literature and academics ==
- Alexandra Gage, Viscountess Gage (born 1969), British lecturer
- Leighton Gage (1942–2013), American writer
- Nicholas Gage (born 1938), Greek-American writer

== Military and naval ==
- Henry Gage (soldier) (1597–1645), soldier in the English Civil War
- Richard Gage (soldier), Union soldier in the American Civil War
- Thomas Gage (1719–1787), British general in the American Revolution

== Politics and government ==
- Delwyn Gage (1930–2025), American politician from Montana
- Douglas Gage, American politician
- Frances Dana Barker Gage, suffragist and women's rights leader
- Fred Kelton Gage (1902-1951), American lawyer and politician
- George Gage, 7th Viscount Gage (1932–1993)
- Henry Gage (1852–1924), American politician from California
- Henry Gage, Viscount Gage, several people
- Jack R. Gage (1899–1970), American politician from Wyoming
- John Gage (Tudor politician), English politician
- Kelly Gage (1925-2017), American lawyer and politician
- Lyman Gage (1836–1927), American financier and politician
- Matilda Joslyn Gage (1826–1898), women's suffrage activist
- Nicolas Gage, 8th Viscount Gage (born 1934)
- Richard Gage (architect), leader of the group Architects & Engineers for 9/11 Truth
- Viscount Gage, several people
- Sir William Gage, 7th Baronet (1695–1744)
- William Gage, 2nd Viscount Gage (1718–1791)

== Religion ==
- Thomas Gage (clergyman) (c. 1597 – 1656), English clergyman
- W.D. Gage, Nebraska minister, namesake of Gage County, Nebraska

== Science and technology ==
- Andrew Thomas Gage (1871–1945), Scottish botanist and surgeon
- Fred Gage, American geneticist
- Julia C. Gage, American cancer epidemiologist
- Linda Gage, American demographer
- Nathaniel Gage (1917–2008), American educational psychologist
- Phineas Gage (1823–1860), American railroad construction foreman whose personality was changed by an accident that destroyed part of his brain
- Simon Henry Gage (1851–1944), American professor of anatomy, histology, and embryology
- Susanna Phelps Gage (1857–1915), American embryologist and comparative anatomist
- Thomas Gage (botanist) (1781–1820), British botanist
- Walter Gage (1922–1978), Canadian mathematician

== Sports ==
- Bobby Gage (1927–2005), American football player
- Ethan Gage, (born in 1991), Canadian soccer player
- Joaquin Gage (born 1973), Canadian ice hockey player
- Jody Gage (born 1959), Canadian ice hockey player
- Justin Gage (born 1981), American football player
- Kevin Gage (footballer), (born in 1964), English football player
- Matt Gage (born 1993), American baseball player
- Nick Gage, wrestler
- Russell Gage (born 1996), American football player
- Jason Gage (Born 1986)

== Other ==
- Jetseta Gage (1994–2005), American victim of kidnap and murder
- Margaret Kemble Gage, alleged spy, wife of General Thomas Gage
- Polly Gage (1805–1882), namesake of Aunt Polly’s Wash Tub
