= Gaige =

Gaige is a surname. Notable people with the name include:

- Amity Gaige (born 1972), American novelist
- Frederick McMahon Gaige (1890–1976), American entomologist and herpetologist
- Helen Beulah Thompson Gaige (1890–1976), American herpetologist
- Jeremy Gaige (1927–2011), American chess archivist and journalist

== See also ==
- Gaige Homestead, a historic home in Schenectady County, New York
- Gaige the Mechromancer, a character in the video game Borderlands 2
- Gage (disambiguation)
- Gauge (disambiguation)
