= Senator Gage =

Senator Gage may refer to:

- Delwyn Gage (born 1930), Montana State Senate
- George Gage (politician) (1813–1899), Illinois State Senate
- Joshua Gage (1763–1831), Massachusetts State Senate
- Kelly Gage (1925–2017), Minnesota State Senate
