= Val Imm =

- Imm, circa 1963

Member of the Minnesota Senate
- In office 1935–1966
- Preceded by: Gustav Widell
- Succeeded by: Kelly Gage
- Constituency: 8th district (1935-1962); 11th district (1963-1966)

Member of the Minnesota House of Representatives from the 8th district
- In office 1933–1934 Serving with Lester Ulrich

Personal details
- Born: August 28, 1893 Granton, Wisconsin
- Died: June 10, 1981 (aged 87) Dallas, Texas
- Party: Nonpartisan (Minnesota Legislature); Republican (other races) (Note: From 1913 to 1973, elections in Minnesota were non-partisan. In the Minnesota Legislature, Imm caucused with the Conservatives. For other elections, such as those for the United States Congress, Imm registered as a Republican candidate.)
- Children: 6

Val Imm (August 28, 1893 – June 10, 1981) was an American politician and newspaper editor. He served in the Minnesota House of Representatives from 1933 to 1934, and in the Minnesota Senate from 1935 to 1966.

== Early life ==
Imm was born on August 28, 1893 in Granton, Wisconsin. He then moved to Amherst, Nebraska, and then to Minnesota in 1915, first to Rockford, then Jordan, then Mankato in 1926, where he lived at the time he was elected.

== Career ==
Prior to his time in the Minnesota Legislature, Imm served one term on the Mankato city council. Outside of politics, he was the owner and editor of local newspaper The Mankato News from 1925 until it ceased publication in 1960.

He was first elected to the Legislature in 1932 as one of two members of the House of Representatives from the 8th district, alongside Farmer-Labor politician Lester Ulrich. In March 1934, he filed to run for the Minnesota Senate, following the retirement of incumbent Gustav Widell, and defeated challenger Josiah A. Baker in the general election that November. He was a member of the Senate Finance Committee throughout his entire tenure, becoming the head of the committee in 1955.

In 1940, Imm filed to run as a Republican candidate for Minnesota's 2nd congressional district. He was defeated by eventual winner Joseph P. O'Hara in the primary elections. Imm ran again for the 2nd congressional district in 1948, and was narrowly defeated again in the primaries by O'Hara.

In 1966, Imm lost re-election to Kelly Gage, ending his thirty year tenure in the Senate.

== Personal life ==
Imm married Gertrude A. Fehlandt in 1927. The couple had 6 children together. Four of them - Ruth, Valerie, Patricia, and Robert - worked as pages in the Minnesota Senate. His brother Martin H. Imm and son Robert were killed in a plane crash on November 22, 1953.

== Death ==
Imm died on June 10, 1981 in Dallas, Texas. He was 87.
