= Gage =

Gage may refer to:

== Measurement ==
- An uncommon, US English spelling of gauge
- Stream gauge, aka Stream gage, a site along a stream where flow measurements are made

== People ==
- Gage (surname)
- Gage Golightly (born 1993), American actress
- Gage Jump (born 2003), American baseball player
- Gage Larvadain (born 2003), American football player

== Places ==
=== Hong Kong ===
- Gage Street, Hong Kong

=== United States ===
- Gage, Kentucky
- Gage, New Mexico
- Gage, Oklahoma
- Gage, West Virginia
- Gage County, Nebraska
- Gage Park, Chicago, Illinois

== Other uses ==
- Gage (finance) a medieval financial instrument, and the origin of the word mortgage
- Gage Educational Publishing Company
- Gage Roads, a sea channel near Perth, Western Australia
- A. S. Gage Ranch, in west Texas
- Great American Gymnastics Express, a gymnastics academy located in Missouri
- Greengage or gage, a plum-like fruit
- Nathaniel Parker Gage School, listed on the National Register of Historic Places in Washington, D. C.
- USS Gage (APA-168), US attack transport ship
- Weather gage, in military sea tactics, a windward position relative to an enemy ship
- Cadillac Gage Commando, used by Police
- Surety, in an action of debt; see Compurgation § Surety

== See also ==
- Gaige (disambiguation)
- Gauge (disambiguation)
