= The Network is the Computer =

Information technology slogan

Sun Microsystems originally started using the slogan in the 1980s.

In 2019, the content delivery network and DDoS mitigation company Cloudflare took the rights of the slogan by registering it.

"The Network is the Computer" is a slogan that was originally coined by John Gage for Sun Microsystems in 1984. Contrary to popular belief, the slogan was not coined by Scott McNealy. Wired dubbed the phrase a "truism of Silicon Valley".

Sun employee Larry Wake said of the slogan, "When Sun originated that tag line in the early 1980s, it was actually quite audacious. It was a stake in the ground [stating] ‘Computers should be networked, or they're… not computers. Well, at least, you're missing their potential by a country mile.'"

== History ==
The first slogan used by Sun was "Open Systems for Open Minds"; "The Network is the Computer" has been the tagline of Sun for decades. According to Sun's former director of CAD/CAM marketing, the meaning of the slogan is that you had one window into the network through your desktop computer and that with the appropriate software, other people's computing power could be utilized with offloading. In 2010, Oracle bought Sun but without the slogan being discussed, used or defended. In July 2019, content delivery network provider Cloudflare bought the rights to the expired trademark. John Gage stated in an interview with John Graham-Cumming that he was fine with Cloudflare having bought the rights because it meant Sun's efforts were successful.

== See also ==
- Eric Schmidt § Schmidt's Law
