= John Gage (disambiguation) =

John Gage was a partner at Kleiner Perkins and the former Vice President of the Science Office at Sun Microsystems.

John or Jack Gage may also refer to:

== Politicians and landowners ==
- John B. Gage (1887–1970), mayor of Kansas City, Missouri, 1940–1946
- Sir John Gage (15th-century landowner) (died 1475)
- Sir John Gage (Tudor politician) (1479–1556), English Tudor politician
- John Gage (19th-century landowner) (1802–1890), American business owner, landowner and spiritualist
- John Gage (died 1598), MP for Lewes
- Sir John Gage, 1st Baronet (died 1633), English baronet and landowner
- Jack R. Gage (1899–1970), American politician

== Others ==
- John Gage (Indecent Proposal), fictional character in the film Indecent Proposal
- John Gage, fictional character in the American television series Emergency!
- Jack Gage (director) (1912–1989), American film and television director
- John Gage (art historian) (1938–2012), British art historian
- John Gage (unionist) (born 1946), American labor union leader
- Jack Gage (rugby union)

== See also ==
- John Gage Rokewode (1786–1842), British historian and antiquarian
- John Gager (born 1937), professor of religion at Princeton University
