= Shea Stadium =

Stadium in Queens, New York (1964–2009)

William A. Shea Municipal Stadium
- Shea Stadium; Shea
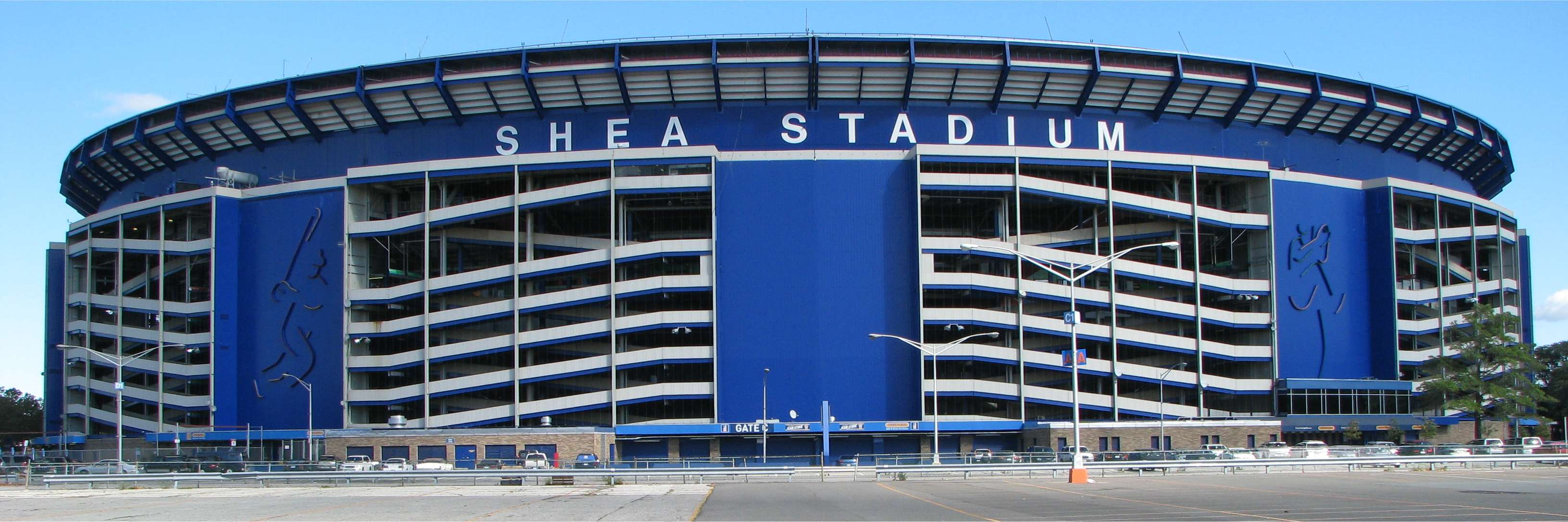
- Shea Stadium in 2007

- Location within New York City Location within New York Location within the United States
- Interactive map of William A. Shea Municipal Stadium
- Full name: William A. Shea Municipal Stadium
- Former names: Flushing Meadow Park Municipal Stadium (1961–1962)
- Address: 123–01 Roosevelt Avenue
- Location: Flushing, Queens, New York City
- Coordinates: 40°45′20″N 73°50′53″W
- Owner: City of New York; New York Mets
- Operator: New York City Department of Parks and Recreation (1964–1981); New York Mets (1964–2008)
- Capacity: Baseball: 57,333; Football: 60,372
- Surface: Kentucky Bluegrass
Field size
Left field	338 ft (103 m)
Left field (1964–1977)	341 ft (104 m)
Medium left-center	358 ft (109 m)
Left-center	371 ft (113 m)
Left-center (deep)	396 ft (121 m)
Center	410 ft (125 m)
Right-center (deep)	396 ft (121 m)
Right-center	371 ft (113 m)
Medium right-center	358 ft (109 m)
Right field	338 ft (103 m)
Right field (1964–1977)	341 ft (104 m)

Construction
- Groundbreaking: October 28, 1961
- Opened: April 17, 1964
- Closed: September 28, 2008 (Final game)
- Demolished: October 14, 2008 – February 18, 2009
- Cost: $28.5 million ($296 million in 2025 dollars)
- Architect: Praeger-Kavanagh-Waterbury
- General contractor: Carlin–Crimmins J.V.

Tenants
- New York Mets (MLB) 1964–2008; New York Jets (AFL / NFL) 1964–1983; New York Yankees (MLB) 1974–1975; New York Giants (NFL) 1975; St. John's Red Storm (NCAA) 2000

William A. Shea Municipal Stadium (/ʃeɪ/ SHAY), typically shortened to Shea Stadium, was a multi-purpose stadium in Flushing Meadows–Corona Park in Queens, New York City. Opened in 1964, it was home to the New York Mets of Major League Baseball (MLB) from 1964 to 2008, as well as the New York Jets of the American Football League (AFL) and the National Football League (NFL) from 1964 to 1983.

The stadium was named in honor of William Shea, who was most responsible for bringing National League baseball back to New York after the Dodgers and Giants left for California in 1957. It was demolished in 2009 following the opening of the adjacent Citi Field, the ballpark built to replace it and the current home of the Mets. The former footprint of Shea Stadium is part of Citi Field's parking lots.

== History ==
=== Planning and construction ===
The origins of Shea Stadium go back to the relocations of the Brooklyn Dodgers and New York Giants in 1957, which left New York without a National League baseball team.

Prior to the Dodgers' departure, New York City official Robert Moses tried to interest owner Walter O'Malley in the site as the location for a new stadium, but they did not reach an agreement. O'Malley preferred to pay for construction himself and own the stadium outright, and thus control the revenue from parking, concessions, and other events. The city, in contrast, wanted to build the stadium, rent it to the users, and retain the ancillary revenue rights to pay off its construction bonds. Additionally, O'Malley wanted to build in Brooklyn, while Moses insisted on Flushing Meadows. When Los Angeles offered O'Malley what New York City would not—complete ownership of a stadium—he left for southern California in a preemptive bid to install the Dodgers there before a new or existing major league franchise could beat him to it. At the same time, Horace Stoneham moved his New York Giants from Manhattan's Polo Grounds to San Francisco (although he originally considered moving them to Minneapolis), ensuring that there would be two National League teams in California, and preserving the long standing rivalry with the Dodgers.

In 1960, the National League agreed to grant an expansion franchise to the owners of the New York franchise in the abortive Continental League, provided that the team play in a new stadium. Mayor Robert F. Wagner Jr. personally wired all of the National League owners to assure them that the city would build a stadium.

Unlike O'Malley, the owners of the franchise that eventually became the Mets felt Queens was the logical home for their new ballpark. They wanted to secure the loyalties of both Dodgers and Giants fans, and feared that a team in Manhattan or Brooklyn would be seen as a de facto revival of the respective borough's former franchise, thus possibly alienating fans in the other borough. A club playing in Flushing Meadows (located roughly the same distance from Manhattan and Brooklyn) would not only likely avoid the same perception, but presumably capture the loyalty of fans in Queens as well, thus potentially confining support for the New York Yankees of the American League to their home borough of The Bronx on the mainland.

Nevertheless, Moses and William A. Shea, the New York lawyer who had led the effort to bring National League baseball back to New York, faced a problem. New York state law of the time did not allow a city to borrow money to build a stadium. The only way for the city to finance a stadium would be to demonstrate that the stadium could pay for itself. With this in mind, Moses and Shea proposed to have the new team pay substantial rent in order to pay off 30-year bonds. This provision came back to haunt the Mets years later; they never met that monetary commitment, and it caused them financial problems for years.

On October 6, 1961, the Mets signed a 30-year stadium lease, with an option for a 10-year renewal. Rent (for a facility originally budgeted to cost $9 million) was set at $450,000 for the first year, to be reduced by $20,000 in each subsequent year until it reached $300,000 annually.

In their inaugural season in 1962, the expansion Mets played in the Polo Grounds, sharing the facility with the New York Titans of the upstart American Football League which had begun play in 1960. The original plans were for both teams to move to a new stadium in 1963. In October 1962, Mets official Tom Meany said, "Only a series of blizzards or some other unforeseen trouble might hamper construction." That unforeseen trouble surfaced in a number of ways: the severe winter of 1962–1963, the bankruptcies of two subcontractors, and labor issues. The result was that both the Mets and the football team (by then renamed the Jets) were forced to play at the Polo Grounds for one more year.

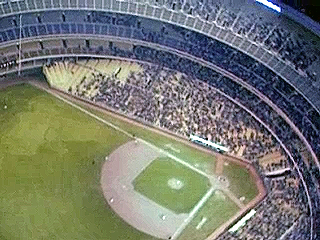
Shea during its inaugural 1964 season

It was originally called "Flushing Meadow Park Municipal Stadium" – the name of the public park within which it was built – but a movement to rename it in honor of Shea was successful.

=== Opening ===
After 29 months of construction and $28.5 million spent, Shea Stadium opened on April 17, 1964, with the Pittsburgh Pirates beating the Mets 4–3 before a crowd of 50,312. There were no prior exhibition games or events, and the stadium was barely finished in time for the home opener. Because of a jurisdictional dispute between Local 3 of the International Brotherhood of Electrical Workers and Local 1106 of the Communications Workers of America, the telephone and telegraph wiring was not finished in time for opening day. The stadium opened five days before the 1964–65 New York World's Fair, across Roosevelt Avenue. Although not officially part of the fair grounds, the stadium sported steel panels on its exterior in the blue-and-orange colors of the Fair, the same team colors of the Mets. The panels were removed in 1980.

=== Demolition ===
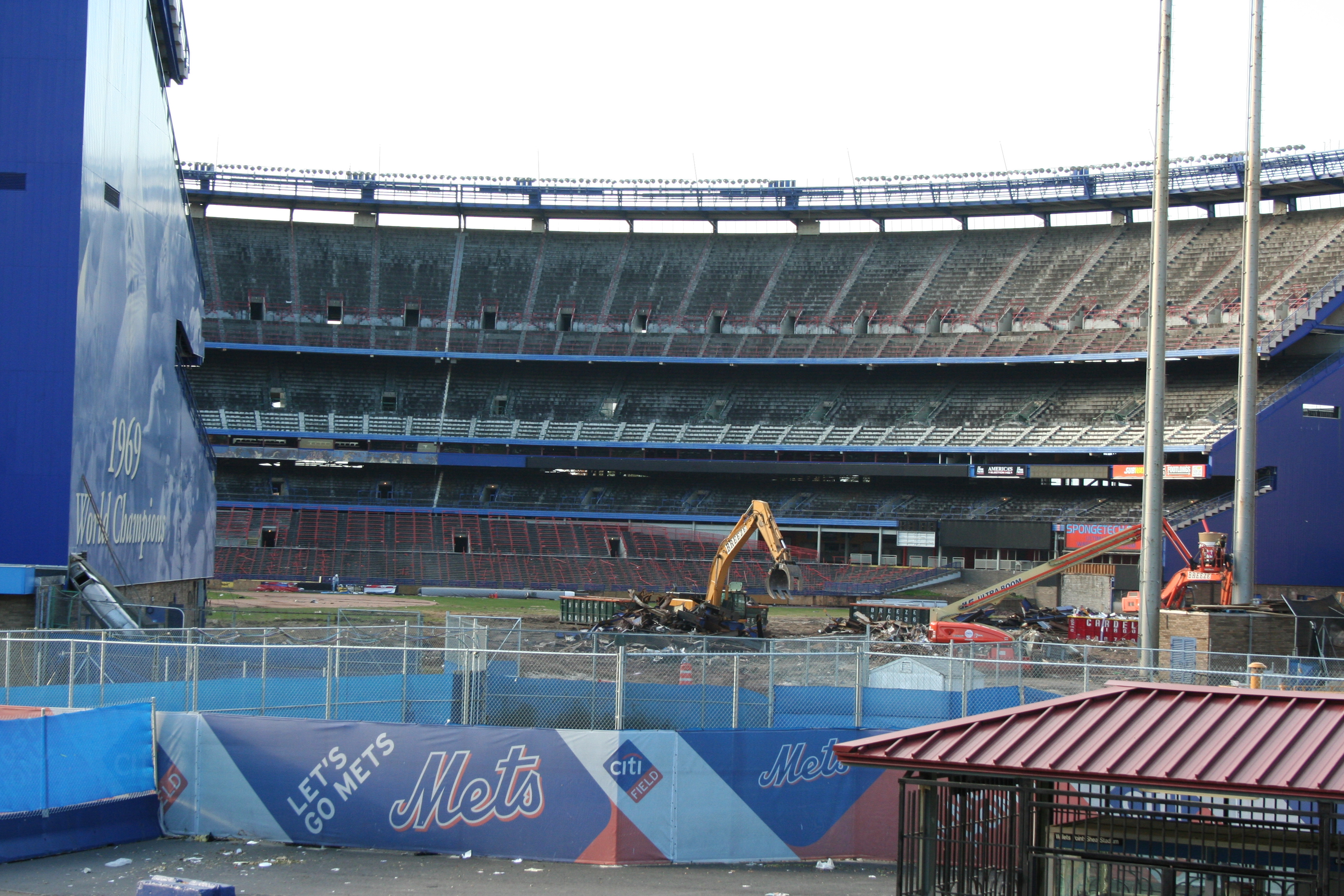
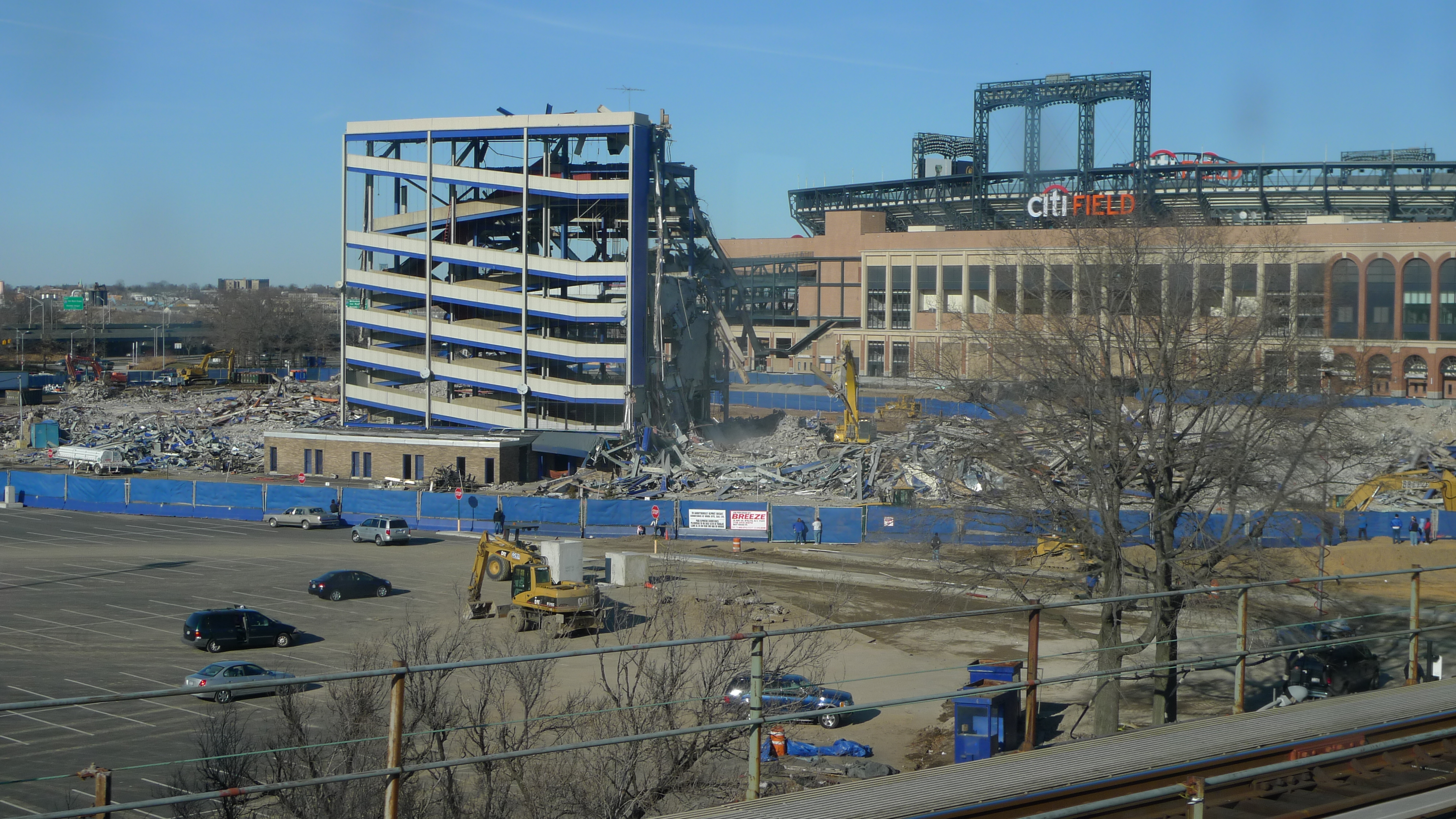
Demolition in progress. Top photo: close-up view of the stadium during demolition. Bottom photo: demolition as viewed from the IRT Flushing Line with Citi Field visible in the background.

In accordance with New York City law, in 2009 Shea Stadium was dismantled, rather than imploded. The company with the rights to sell memorabilia was given two weeks after the final game to remove seats, signage and other potentially sellable and collectible items before demolition was to begin. The seats were the first ($869 per pair plus tax, a combination of '86 and '69, the team's two World Series championship years), followed by other memorabilia such as the foul poles, dugouts, stadium signage, and the giant letters that spelled out "SHEA" at the front of the building.

After salvaging operations concluded, demolition of the ballpark began on October 14, 2008. On October 18, the scoreboard in right field was demolished, with the bleachers, batter's eye and bullpens shortly thereafter.

By November 10, the field, dugouts and the rest of the field level seats had been demolished.

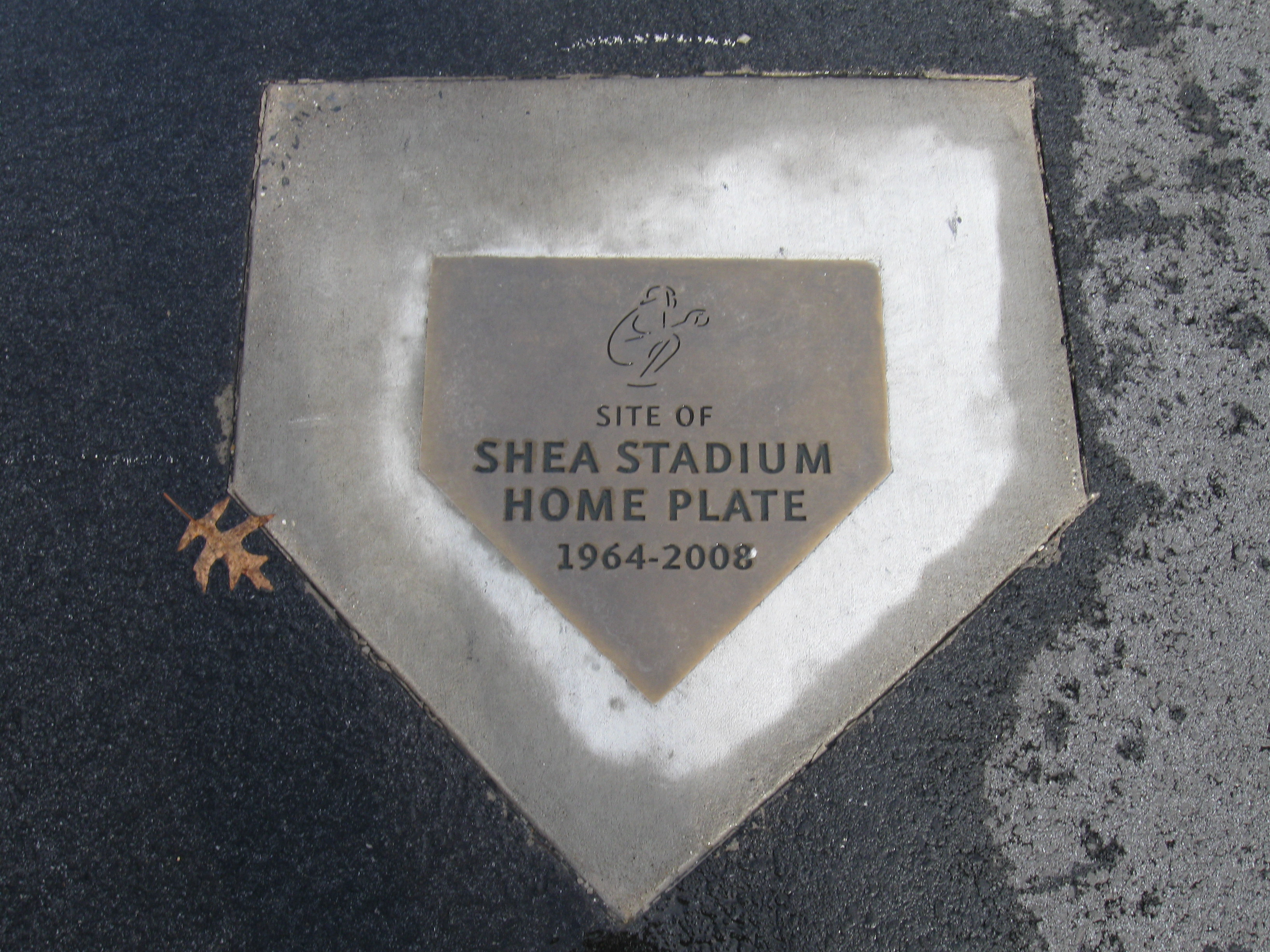
Plaque commemorating the location of Shea Stadium's home plate, now in Citi Field's parking lot

On January 31, 2009, Mets fans all over New York came to Shea Stadium for one final farewell. Fans took a tour of the site, told stories, and sang songs. The last remaining section of seats was demolished on February 18. Fans stood in awe as the remaining structure of Shea Stadium (one section of ramps) was torn down at 11:22 am.

The locations of Shea's home plate, pitcher's mound, and bases are marked in Citi Field's parking lot. The plaques feature engravings of the neon signs depicting baseball players that graced the exterior of the stadium from 1988 onward.

=== Redevelopment ===
As of 2025, Mets owner Steve Cohen is trying to build a park, casino and entertainment complex at the site, called Metropolitan Park, which had the support of the New York City Council and then-mayor Eric Adams, but is pending approval by the New York State Legislature and the New York State Gaming Commission. The Hard Rock Hotel & Casino Metropolitan Park would be built on the site. Local coalition Fed Up opposes the park alienation, instead advocating for a “Phoenix Meadows Vision Plan” which would create public green space over the parking lot.

== Stadium usage ==
=== Baseball ===
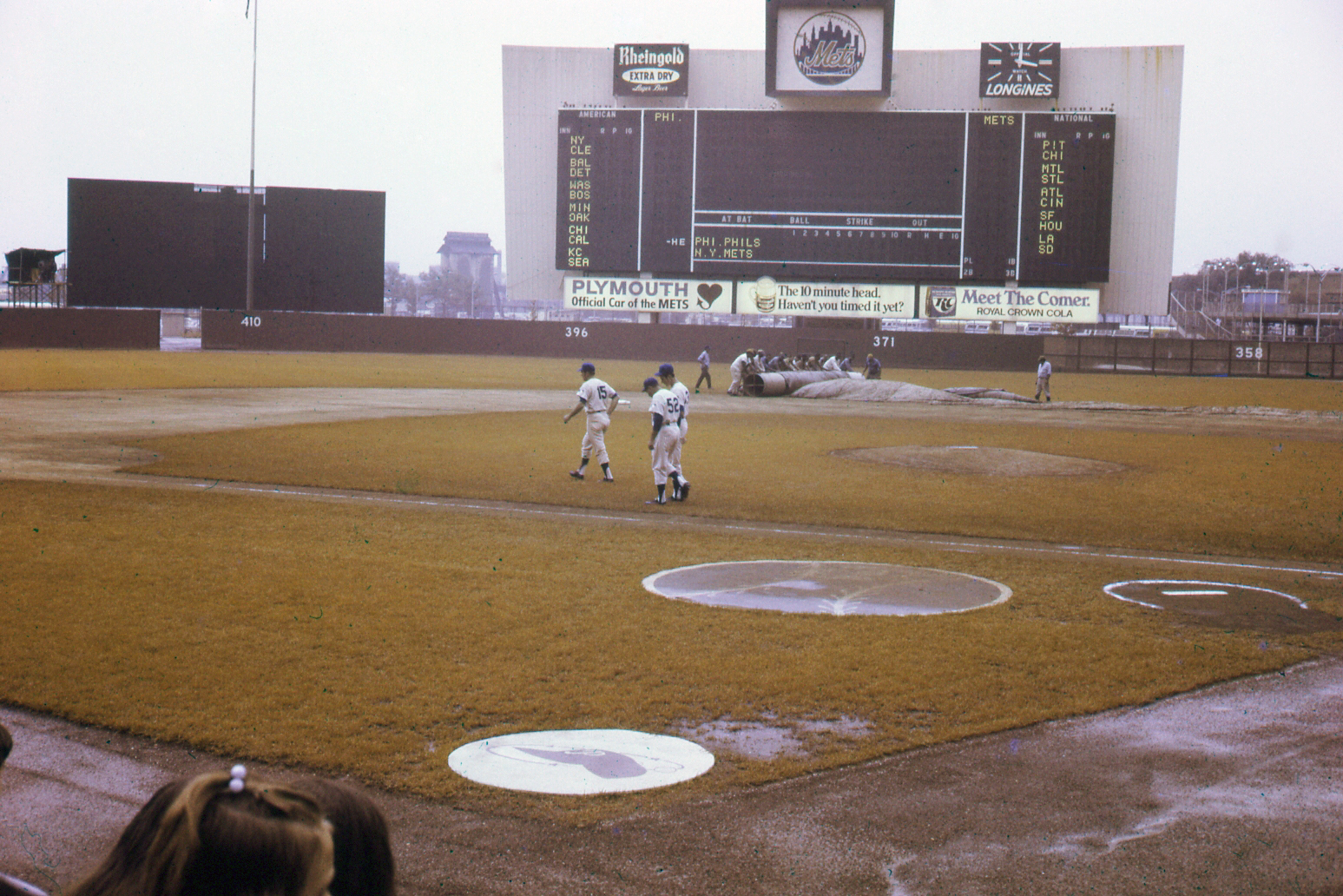
A Mets game in 1969

Shea Stadium was the home of the New York Mets starting in 1964, and it hosted its only All-Star Game that first year, in which Johnny Callison of the Philadelphia Phillies hit a walk-off home run in the ninth inning to win the game. A month earlier, on Father's Day, Callison's teammate, future Hall of Fame member and U.S. Senator Jim Bunning, pitched a perfect game against the Mets.

The stadium was often criticized by baseball purists for many reasons, even after it was retrofitted to be a baseball-only stadium after the Jets left. The upper deck was one of the highest in the majors. The lower boxes were farther from the field than similar seats in other parks because they were still on the rails that had swiveled them into position for football. Outfield seating was limited, in part because the stadium had been designed to be fully enclosed. (The planned enclosure was never built.)

At one time, Shea's foul territory was one of the largest in the majors. A large foul territory was common for ballparks built to accommodate football fields during the 1960s; in Shea's case the fact that it was designed to be fully enclosed also increased the foul territory. However, seats added over the years in the lower level greatly reduced the size of foul territory by the 21st century. Shea always had a natural grass surface, in contrast to other multi-purpose stadiums such as Three Rivers Stadium, Veterans Stadium, and Riverfront Stadium, which were built during the same era but had artificial turf (although stadiums like Atlanta-Fulton County Stadium, RFK Stadium, and the Oakland-Alameda County Coliseum, which were also built during this era, featured grass surfaces like Shea Stadium did).

Shea Stadium hosted postseason baseball in 1969, 1973, 1986, 1988, 1999, 2000, and 2006; it hosted the World Series in 1969, 1973, 1986, and 2000. It was the home of the 1969 "Miracle Mets", led by former Brooklyn Dodger Gil Hodges, that defied 100–1 odds and won the World Series after seven straight seasons in last or next-to-last place. Shea became famous for the bedlam that took place after the Mets won the decisive Game 5 of the World Series, as fans stormed the field in celebration. Similar scenes took place a few weeks earlier after the Mets clinched the National League East title, and then defeated the Atlanta Braves in the first National League Championship Series to win the pennant.

Tommie Agee, Lenny Dykstra, Todd Pratt, Robin Ventura, and Benny Agbayani hit post-season walk-off home runs at Shea. Ventura's may have been the most famous of the postseason walk-off hits, but it was famously called "the Grand Slam Single" because after making the game-winning hit he was mobbed by his teammates before he could reach second base, and because he did not touch each of the bases it did not count as a home run. This technicality probably made Ventura (who was known for hitting grand slams) and the hit itself even more famous.

Agee was the only player in the history of the ballpark to hit a fair ball into the upper deck in left field. The spot was marked with a sign featuring Agee's number 20 and the date, which was April 10, 1969. Teammate Cleon Jones said the ball was still rising when it hit the seats, so it very likely could have been the longest home run hit at Shea. It came in the second inning, and Agee hit another in the seventh over the center field wall; both solo shots were off of Montreal Expos starter Larry Jaster, and the Mets won 4–2.

In 1971, Dave Kingman – then with the San Francisco Giants and later to play for the Mets on two occasions – hit a home run that smashed the windshield of the Giants' team bus, parked behind the left field bullpen.

For many years, the Mets' theme song, "Meet the Mets", was played at Shea before every home game. Jane Jarvis, a local jazz artist, played the popular songs on the Thomas organ at Mets games for many years at the stadium.

On October 3, 2004, it was the venue for the last game in the history of the Montreal Expos, and the Mets won 8–1. Montreal's major league history had also started at Shea Stadium, 35 years earlier. The following year, the Expos relocated to Washington, D.C., and became the Nationals.

The last game played at Shea Stadium was a 4–2 loss to the Florida Marlins on September 28, 2008. However, the Mets were in the thick of the playoff chase until the last day. A win would have meant another game at Shea as the Mets were scheduled to play the Milwaukee Brewers in a one-game playoff for the National League Wild Card berth. Following the game, there was a "Shea Goodbye" tribute in which many players from the Mets' glory years entered the stadium and touched home plate one final time so that fans could pay their last respects to the players and the stadium the Mets called home for 45 years. The ceremony ended with Tom Seaver throwing a final pitch to Mike Piazza; then, as the Beatles' "In My Life" played on the stadium speakers, the two former Met stars walked out of the centerfield gate and closed it behind them, followed by a display of blue and orange fireworks set to Fanfare for the Common Man.

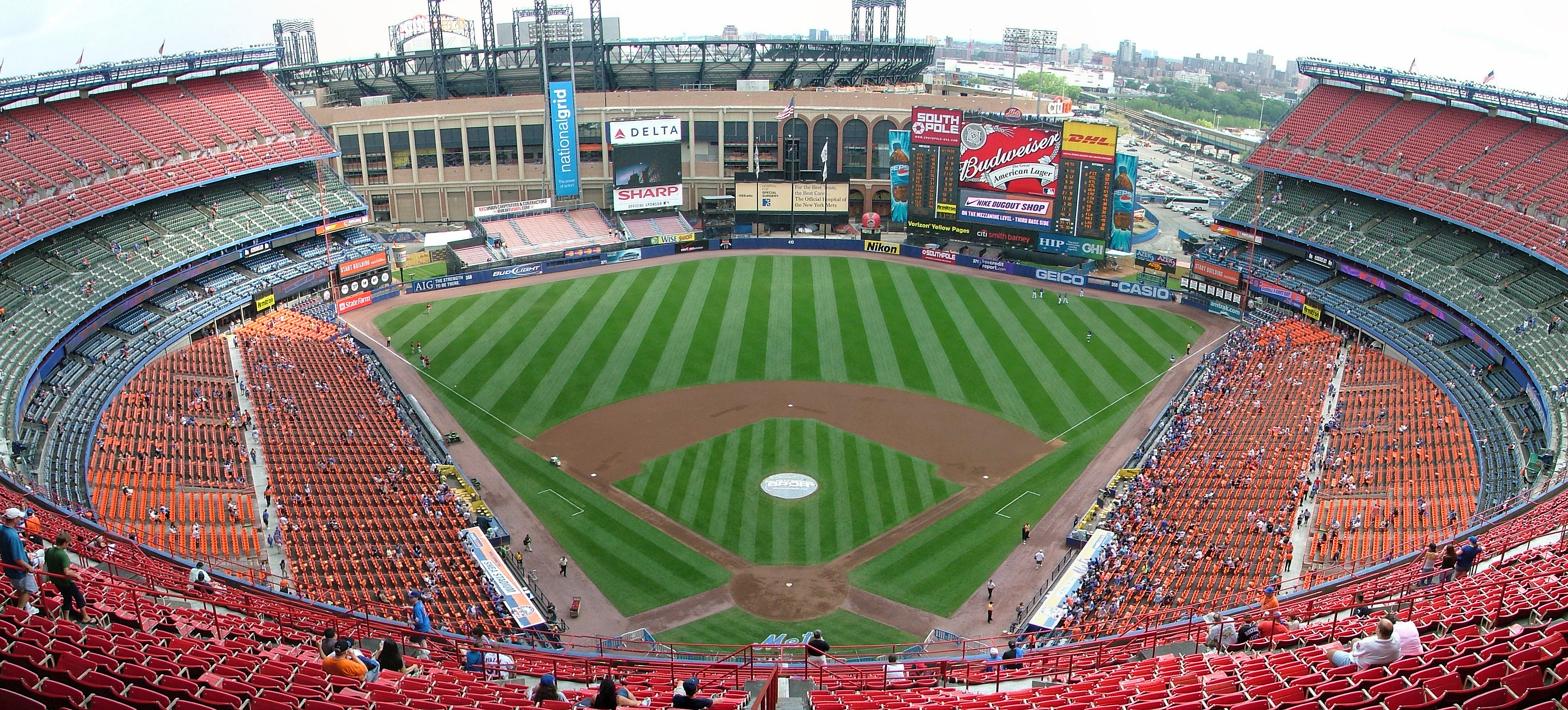
A panoramic view of Shea Stadium from the upper deck behind home plate before a baseball game in 2008. The construction of Citi Field is visible beyond the outfield wall.

Three National League Division Series were played at Shea Stadium. The Mets won all three, and never lost a Division Series game at Shea.

- 1999 against the Arizona Diamondbacks – Mets won 3 games to 1
- 2000 against the San Francisco Giants – Mets won 3 games to 1
- 2006 against the Los Angeles Dodgers – Mets won 3 games to 0

Seven National League Championship Series were played at Shea Stadium.

- 1969 against the Atlanta Braves – Mets won 3 games to 0
- 1973 against the Cincinnati Reds – Mets won 3 games to 2
- 1986 against the Houston Astros – Mets won 4 games to 2
- 1988 against the Los Angeles Dodgers – Dodgers won 4 games to 3
- 1999 against the Atlanta Braves – Braves won 4 games to 2
- 2000 against the St. Louis Cardinals – Mets won 4 games to 1
- 2006 against the St. Louis Cardinals – Cardinals won 4 games to 3

The decisive seventh game of this series was played at Shea Stadium, marking the only time that the Mets lost the deciding game of a National League Championship Series at Shea.

Four World Series were played in Shea Stadium.

- 1969 against the Baltimore Orioles – Mets won 4 games to 1
- 1973 against the Oakland Athletics – A's won 4 games to 3
- 1986 against the Boston Red Sox – Mets won 4 games to 3
- 2000 against the New York Yankees – Yankees won 4 games to 1

The Yankees' World Series win in 2000 was the only time that a visiting team won a World Series at Shea Stadium. The Mets won both their World Series titles at Shea Stadium (in Game 5 in 1969, and Game 7 in 1986).

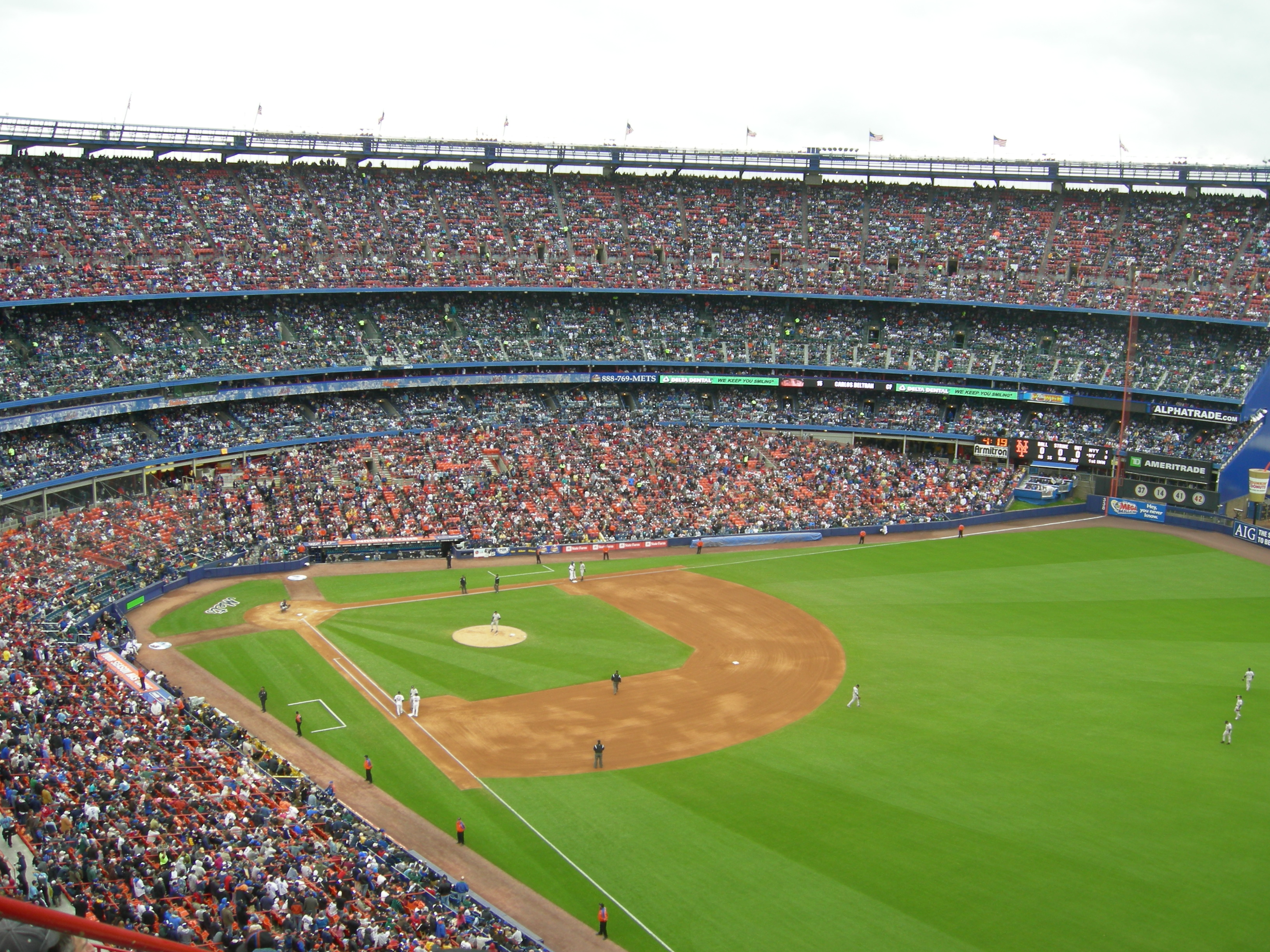
Shea Stadium prior to the start of a New York Mets game in 2008. Shea had the best attendance in the National League that year, averaging over 51,000 fans per game.

The New York Yankees played their home games in Shea Stadium during the 1974 and 1975 seasons while Yankee Stadium was being renovated. The move to Shea was helped by the city and the Mets, with the former helping in setting up office space in Flushing Meadows Park. Joe DiMaggio participated in his final Old Timers Day game in 1975 at Shea.

On the afternoon of April 15, 1998, the Yankees also played one home game at Shea, against the Anaheim Angels after a beam collapsed at Yankee Stadium two days before, destroying several rows of seats. With the Mets playing a game at Shea that evening against the Chicago Cubs, the Yankees used the visitor's locker room and dugout and the Angels used the home dugout and old locker room of the New York Jets. Former Mets star Darryl Strawberry, by then playing for the Yankees, hit a home run during the game. Stadium operators partially raised the Mets' home run apple signal before lowering it back down, to the delight of the crowd. The Yankees won the game, 6–3.

Shea Stadium also hosted the first extra-inning regular season baseball opener played in New York, on March 31, 1998, when the Mets opened their season against their rival Philadelphia Phillies, playing the longest scoreless opening day game in the National League and the longest one in Major League Baseball since 1926. The Mets won the game 1–0 in the bottom of the 14th inning.

During the 1977 New York City blackout the stadium was plunged into darkness at approximately 9:30 p.m. during a game between the Mets and the Chicago Cubs. It occurred during the bottom of the sixth inning, with the Mets trailing the Cubs 2–1 and Lenny Randle at bat. Jane Jarvis, Shea's organist (affectionately known as Shea's "Queen of Melody") played "Jingle Bells" and "White Christmas". The game was eventually completed on September 16, with the Cubs defeating the Mets 5–2.

=== Boxing ===
Shea Stadium held boxing matches in the mid-1960s.

=== Football ===
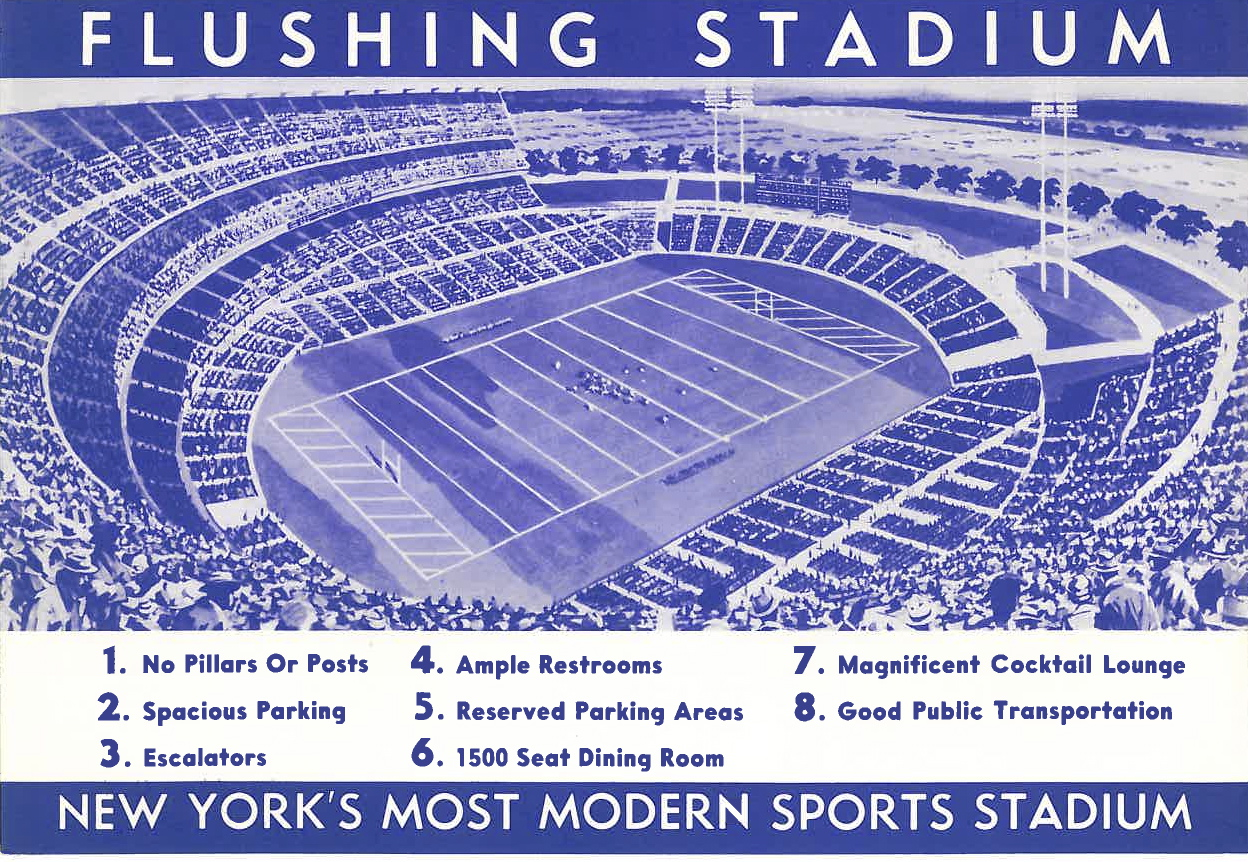
A concept drawing of Shea Stadium in football configuration

The New York Jets of the American Football League and later, the National Football League played at Shea for 20 seasons, from 1964 through 1983 (excluding their first home game in 1977, played at Giants Stadium). The stadium hosted three Jets playoff games: the AFL Championship in 1968 (defeating the Oakland Raiders, 27–23), an AFL Inter-Divisional Playoff in 1969 (a 13–6 loss to the Kansas City Chiefs) and the 1981 AFC Wild Card Playoff game (lost 31–27 to the Buffalo Bills).

For most of the Jets' tenure at Shea, they were burdened by onerous lease terms imposed at the insistence of the Mets. Until 1978, the Jets could not play their first home game until the Mets' season was finished. For instance, in 1969, the defending Super Bowl champion Jets did not play a home game until October 20 due to the Mets advancing to (and winning) the World Series. As a result, the 1969 Jets opened with five consecutive road games, and then played all seven home games in consecutive weeks before closing with two road games. Even after 1978, the Mets' status as Shea's primary tenants would require the Jets to go on long road trips (switching Shea from baseball to football configuration was a complex process involving electrical, plumbing, field, and other similar work). The stadium was also not well maintained in the 1970s. The Jets moved to Giants Stadium for the 1984 season, enticed by the more than 15,000 additional seats there. Fans ripped apart Shea after the last game of the 1983 season, which also was the last game for Hall of Fame quarterback Terry Bradshaw, who threw two touchdown passes to lead the Pittsburgh Steelers to a 34–7 victory. Even the scoreboard operator had a field day, displaying the home team as the "N.J. Jets".

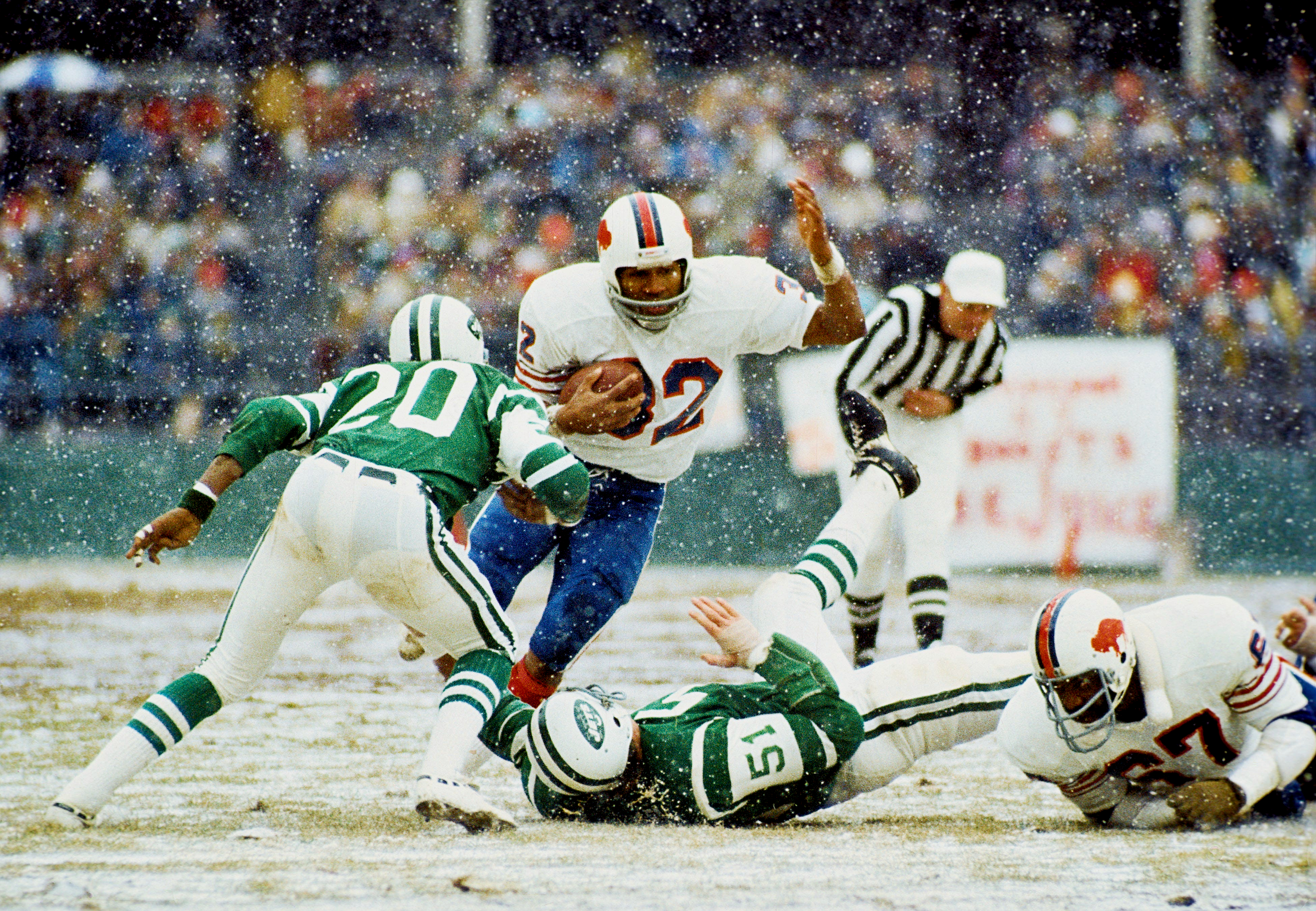
O.J. Simpson pictured breaking the NFL's single-season rushing record at Shea Stadium

It was at Shea Stadium on December 16, 1973, that O. J. Simpson became the first running back to gain 2,000 yards in a single season (and, to date, the only player to do it in 14 games or fewer). In the 1983 season, a Jets game against the Los Angeles Rams featured an 85-yard touchdown run by rookie Eric Dickerson, as well as a brawl between Rams offensive tackle Jackie Slater and Jets defensive end Mark Gastineau when Slater blindsided Gastineau after the Jet performed his infamous "Sack Dance" over fallen Rams quarterback Vince Ferragamo.

The NFL's New York Giants played their 1975 season at Shea while Giants Stadium was being built. The Giants were 5–9 that year (2–5 at Shea). Their coach was Bill Arnsparger and their quarterback was Craig Morton. The Giants played their final five home games of 1973 and all seven in 1974 at the Yale Bowl in New Haven, Connecticut; Yankee Stadium was closed in October 1973 for a massive renovation, which was completed in time for the 1976 baseball season.

On the night of October 9, 1965, Shea Stadium hosted the football rivalry between Army and Notre Dame for the only time. The Fighting Irish blanked the Cadets, 17–0, beginning a 15-game winning streak for Notre Dame in the storied series.

In 1966, the Brooklyn Dodgers of the minor Continental Football League unsuccessfully sued the Jets in an attempt to use the stadium; the team wound up playing on Randall's Island and soon folded. In 1974, the New York Stars of the nascent World Football League also made inquiries to play at Shea, whose schedule was already overcrowded by the Mets, Jets and Yankees (and the following year, the Giants; see below). The Stars also moved out to Randall's Island, playing only a handful of games before shifting to Charlotte, North Carolina.

The football field at Shea extended from around home plate to centerfield, with the baseline seating rotating out to fill left and right fields.

=== Soccer ===
The first soccer game at Shea Stadium occurred during International Soccer League tournament play on June 17, 1965.

The original New York Cosmos beat the Washington Diplomats, 2–0, in an NASL playoff game at Shea on August 17, 1976.

New York United of the American Soccer League called Shea home in 1980.

Date	Winning team	Result	Losing team	Tournament	Attendance
June 17, 1965	Portuguesa	6–3	West Ham United	International friendly	5,130
August 17, 1976	New York Cosmos	2–0	Washington Diplomats	NASL playoffs	22,698

=== Concerts ===
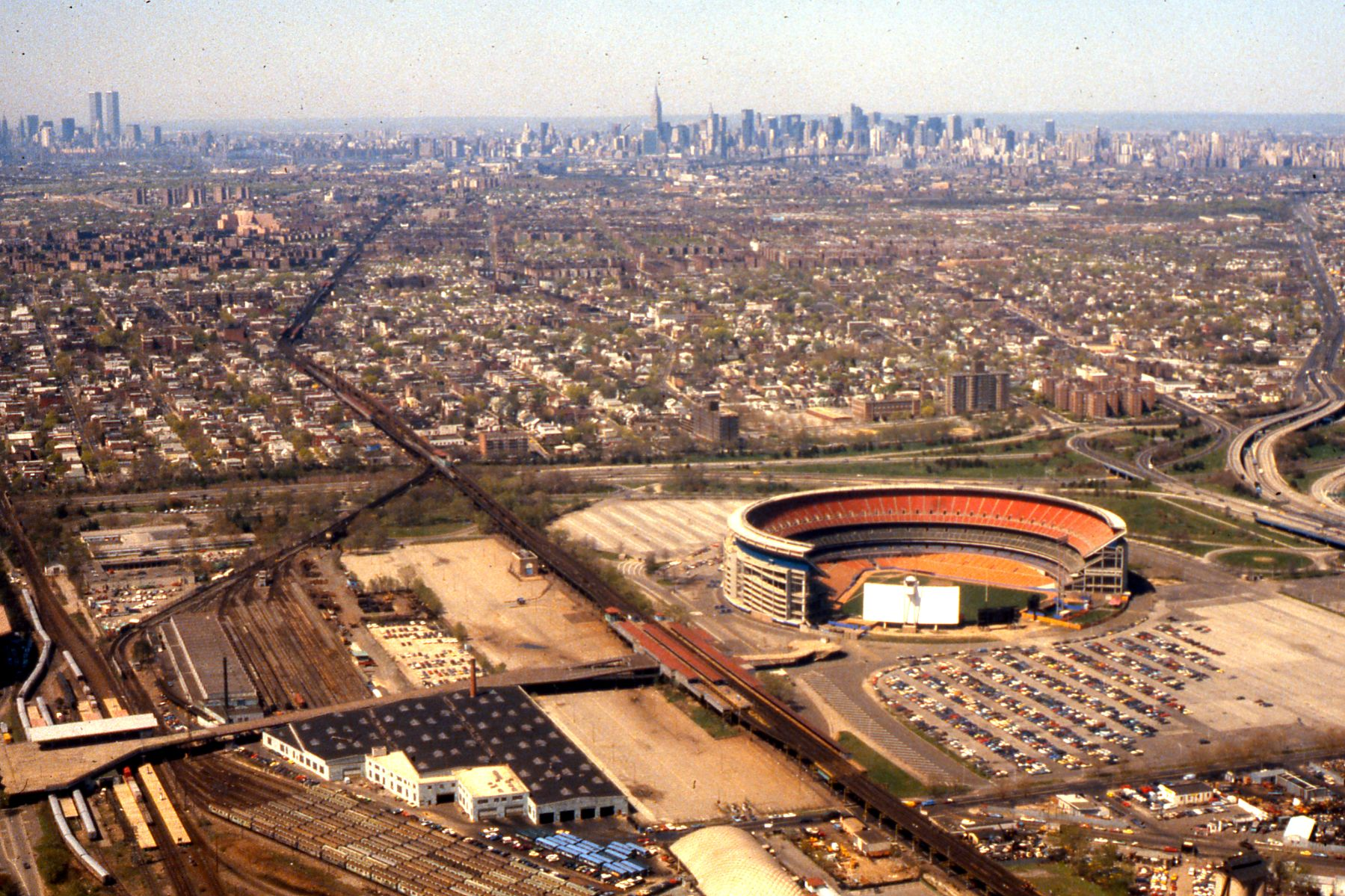
Shea Stadium and vicinity, with the Manhattan skyline in the distance, 1981

On Sunday, August 15, 1965, the Beatles opened their 1965 North American tour there to a record audience of 55,600. "Beatlemania" was at one of its peaks at their Shea concert. Film footage shows many teenagers and women crying, screaming, and even fainting. The crowd noise was such that security guards can be seen covering their ears as the Beatles entered the field. The sound of the crowd was so deafening that none of the Beatles (or anyone else) could hear what they were playing. Nevertheless, it was the first concert to be held at a major stadium and set records for attendance and revenue generation, demonstrating that outdoor concerts on a large scale could be successful and profitable, and led the Beatles to return to Shea for a successful encore on August 23, 1966.

The next major music event to play Shea Stadium after the Beatles' successful appearances was the Summer Festival for Peace on August 6, 1970. It was a day-long fundraiser, which featured many of the era's biggest-selling and seminal rock, folk, blues and jazz performers including: Janis Joplin, Paul Simon, Creedence Clearwater Revival, Steppenwolf, The James Gang, Miles Davis, Tom Paxton, John Sebastian, and others.

The next music show at Shea Stadium was the historic concert by Grand Funk Railroad in 1971, which broke the Beatles' then-record for fastest ticket sales. Humble Pie was the opening band. The same filmmakers for the documentary of the Rolling Stones concert at Altamont were commissioned to film it, but to date, a final film has not been released.

The stadium subsequently hosted numerous concerts, including Jethro Tull with opening act Robin Trower in July 1976 (billed as Tull v. Boeing because of the proximity to LaGuardia Airport), The Who with opening acts The Clash and David Johansen in October 1982 (two concerts), and Simon & Garfunkel in August 1983. On August 18, 1983, The Police played in front of 70,000 fans at Shea, a concert that the band's singer and bassist Sting described as "like playing the top of Everest", and announced near the end of the concert: "We'd like to thank the Beatles for lending us their stadium." The Rolling Stones performed at Shea for a six-night run in October 1989, and Elton John and Eric Clapton played a concert in August 1992. Bruce Springsteen and the E Street Band ended The Rising Tour with three concerts at Shea in early October 2003, with Bob Dylan making a special guest appearance at the final show to perform "Highway 61 Revisited" with Springsteen.

The last concerts were two nights by Billy Joel on July 16 and 18, 2008, dubbed The Last Play at Shea. Among other guest appearances, former Beatle Paul McCartney closed the second show with the Beatles' "Let It Be". Other guests were former Shea performer Roger Daltrey of The Who, Tony Bennett, Don Henley, John Mayer, John Mellencamp, Garth Brooks, and Steven Tyler of Aerosmith. The concert was the subject of a documentary film of the same name, which is used along with Shea's history to tell the story of changes in American suburban life.

Shea groundskeeper Pete Flynn drove the Beatles from the stage to a centerfield gate in 1965, then drove McCartney from the stadium's rear entrance to the stage to perform at Billy Joel's "Last Play at Shea" concert 43 years later in 2008.

=== Other events ===
The 1978 International Convention of Jehovah's Witnesses was held at Shea Stadium from July 12 to 16, 1978. During his tour of America in October 1979, Pope John Paul II was also among those hosted by Shea Stadium. On the morning of the Pontiff's visit, Shea Stadium was awash in torrential rain, causing ankle-deep mud puddles, and threatened to ruin the event. But as the Popemobile entered the stadium, the rain stopped although the deep mud remained.

On December 9, 1979, as part of the halftime show of a National Football League game between the New York Jets and New England Patriots, a model airplane group put on a remote control airplane display. The grand finale was a remote control airplane, weighing 40 lbs, made to look like a red flying lawnmower. The pilot lost control of the airplane, and it crashed into the stands, hitting Kevin Rourke, of Lynn, Massachusetts and John Bowen of Nashua, New Hampshire. Both suffered serious head injuries; Rourke survived but Bowen died four days later.

Between 1972 and 1980, Shea also hosted a Showdown at Shea event three separate times, by the then World Wrestling Federation. In 1980, it hosted a simulcast of the first fight between Roberto Duran and Sugar Ray Leonard, won by Duran.

From 1970 to 1987, the Cape Cod Baseball League (CCBL) played its annual all-star game at various major league stadiums. The games were interleague contests between the CCBL and the Atlantic Collegiate Baseball League (ACBL). The 1982 and 1986 games were played at Shea. The 1986 contest starred game MVP and future Cincinnati Reds all-star pitcher Jack Armstrong.

In the aftermath of the September 11 attacks, the stadium became a staging area for rescuers, its parking lots filled with food, water, medical supplies, even makeshift shelters where relief workers could sleep. Ten days later Shea reopened for the first post-attack sporting event in New York where the Mets beat the Braves, behind a dramatic home run by Mets catcher Mike Piazza.

=== In popular culture ===
In the television serial drama Mad Men, the main character, Don Draper, has his secretary buy a pair of tickets for the Beatles' concert at Shea Stadium in 1965.

The Rutles film All You Need is Cash refers to the ballpark as Che Stadium, "named after the Cuban guerilla leader, Che Stadium."

In the 1966-1968 live action Batman TV series, Shea Stadium was parodied as Spayed Stadium in the episode "Catwoman Goes to College".

In 1987, Marvel Comics rented Shea Stadium to re-enact the wedding of Peter Parker/Spider-Man and Mary Jane Watson.

In the 2007 documentary series Seven Ages of Rock, Shea Stadium was named the most hallowed venue in all of rock music.

In Godzilla: The Series, the stadium was destroyed in a fight between Godzilla and the electromagnetic dream monster Crackler.

Shea Stadium was used for filming the 1973 movie Bang The Drum Slowly starring Robert De Niro and Michael Moriarty and the 1978 film The Wiz. In the latter film, the exterior pedestrian ramps were used for a motorcycle chase scene with Michael Jackson and Diana Ross.

A scene in the 2002 movie Two Weeks Notice takes place at Shea.

In Men in Black, a Mets game at Shea was featured in the film, with outfielder Bernard Gilkey dropping a fly ball after being distracted by an alien spacecraft in the sky. Shea was also featured in Men in Black 3 which is where K and J intercept Griffin and the ArcNet in 1969 before Boris the Animal can capture it.

Shea Stadium was also the setting for two episodes of The King of Queens: "Doug Out" (1999) and "Catching Hell" (2005).

The exterior part of the Stadium is featured in the 2006 videogame Driver: Parallel Lines.

=== 1975: Four teams, one year and one stadium ===
The Mets, Yankees, Jets and Giants all called Shea home in 1975, the only time in professional sports history that two baseball teams and two football teams shared the same facility in the same year.

As Yankee Stadium was being renovated and Giants Stadium was nearing completion, there were scheduling clashes between the four teams once the calendar turned to September. Neither the Jets nor the Giants could play "home" games at Shea Stadium until the baseball season ended for the Mets and Yankees. The matter was simplified when neither baseball team qualified for the postseason; still, there was a two-week overlap as the NFL season started on Sunday, September 21 while the MLB campaign ended on Sunday, September 28. This meant the Jets opened at home on Sunday, October 5, the third week of the season, and the Giants on Sunday, October 12, the season's fourth week. It also meant that the Giants and Jets had to play a combined 14 home games in the final 12 weeks of the 14-week NFL season. To do so, the Giants played two Saturday afternoon home games, neither of which were televised, and both of which were played the day before a Sunday Jets home game. New York football fans thus enjoyed either the Jets or the Giants hosting a Sunday home game every weekend from October 5 through December 21. Shea wound up hosting all four teams on consecutive Sundays: Mets (September 21), Yankees (September 28), Jets (October 5) and Giants (October 12).

In total, the "Big Four" drew 3,738,546 customers to Shea: 1,730,566 by the Mets (76 home dates); 1,288,048 by the Yankees (71 home dates); 361,102 by the Jets (seven home games) and 358,830 by the Giants (also seven). Having both the Giants and Jets share Shea Stadium for one season foreshadowed what was to come in the future with the Meadowlands, after the Jets left Flushing Meadows for New Jersey following the 1983 NFL season.

== Features ==
=== Design ===
Shea was a circular stadium, with the grandstand forming about two-thirds of a circle around the field and ending a short distance beyond the foul lines. The remainder of the perimeter was mostly empty space beyond the outfield fences. This space was occupied by the bullpens, scoreboards, and a section of bleachers beyond the left field fence. The stadium boasted 54 restrooms, 21 escalators, seats for 57,343 fans (although as seating configuration changed constantly over the life of the stadium, that number varied often, dropping to 55,601 by the 1986 World Series, and then increased again over following years to between approximately 56,000 and 57,000, until its closing), and a massive 86' x 175' scoreboard. Also, rather than the standard light towers, Shea featured lamps along its upper reaches. Some deemed Shea a showplace, praised for its convenience, even its "elegance". The stadium's scoreboard in right field, one of the largest in MLB when it opened, weighed over 60 tons. One of its distinctive features was a giant rearview slide projector screen on the top center of the scoreboard; it was intended to display a picture of the current player at bat (a groundbreaking innovation at the time); however, due to lighting issues (it only worked at night when the light was really low; during day games, the picture would not show up at all), it was not used very often and was eventually covered with a giant Mets logo (or a Jets logo when they played).

The stadium was located close to LaGuardia Airport. For many years, interruptions for planes flying overhead were common at Shea; the noise was so loud that radio and television broadcasts could not be heard. Players would usually ask for time during noisy flight approaches and takeoffs.

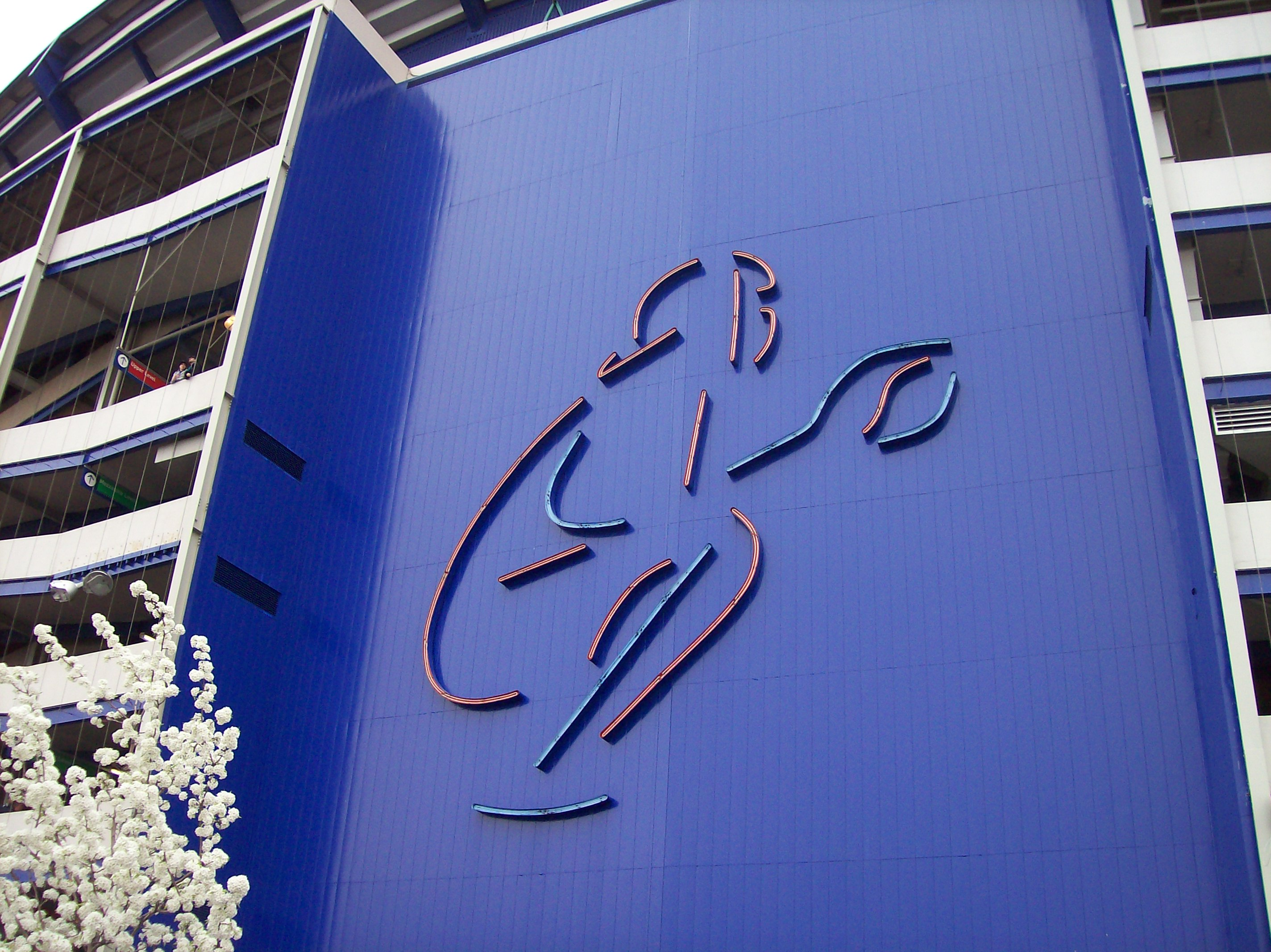
One of the neon players on the outside of Shea Stadium

Shea was originally designed with two motor-operated stands that allow the field level seats to rotate on underground tracks, allowing the stadium to be converted between a baseball and an American football/soccer configuration. In 1981, a new Mitsubishi DiamondVision screen was installed in left field. After the New York Jets football team moved to Giants Stadium in East Rutherford, New Jersey in 1984, the Mets took over operation of the stadium and retrofitted it for exclusive baseball use. As part of the refitting, Shea Stadium's exterior was painted blue and neon signs of baseball player silhouettes were added to the windscreens prior to the 1988 season. Around the same time, the original scoreboard was removed, and a new one installed in its place (fitting into the shell left behind by the old one) allowing for a much greater space for information and entertainment after the original message board above the main scoreboard was covered up by the Budweiser advertisement in 1982. Also, after years of injuries to players crashing into the wooden outfield wall, most notably to 1973 star player Rusty Staub, where one injury caused a dislocated shoulder and forced him to miss or play severely injured during that Championship Season, the original wall finally had padding added to it, as most in baseball already did, greatly reducing injuries to outfielders.

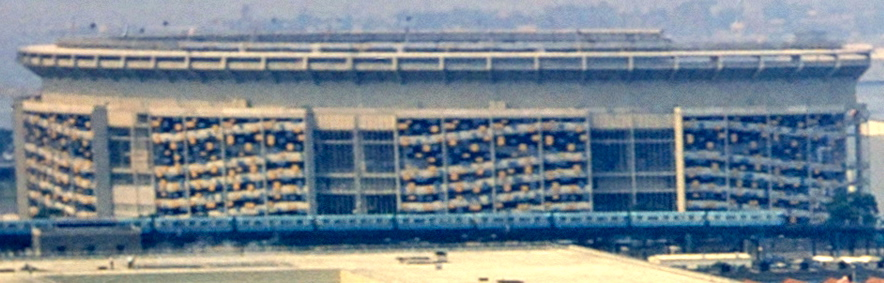
Shea's exterior, pictured here in 1964, was decorated with blue and orange panels from 1964 until their removal in 1980.

Banks of ramps that provided access from the ground to the upper levels were built around the outside circumference of the stadium. The ramps were not walled in and were visible from outside the stadium. The ramps were originally partly covered with many rectangular panels in blue and orange, the Mets' colors. These panels can be seen in the 1970s movie The Wiz, which used the exterior pedestrian ramps for a motorcycle chase scene with Michael Jackson and Diana Ross. The 1960s-style decorations were removed in 1980. The banks of ramps resulted in the outer wall of the stadium jutting out where the banks existed.

The design also allowed for Shea Stadium to be expandable to 90,000 seats, simply by completely enclosing the grandstand. It was also designed to be later enclosed by a dome if warranted. In March 1965, a plan was formally announced to add a glass dome and add 15,000 seats. The Mets strongly objected to the proposal. The idea was later dropped after engineering studies concluded that the stadium's foundation would be unable to support the weight of the dome.

The distances to the right and left field foul poles were initially both 341 feet (104 m). There was a horizontal orange line that determined where a batted ball was a home run or still in play. In 1978, Manager Joe Torre suggested moving in the fences to 338 feet (103 m) in the corners with a wall in front of the original brick wall, to decrease the number of disputed calls.

Originally, all of the seats were wooden, with each level having a different color. The field boxes were yellow, the loge level seats were brown, the mezzanine seats were blue, and the upper deck seats were green. Each level above the field level was divided into box seats below the entrance/exit portals and reserved seats above the portals. The box seats were a darker shade than the reserved seats. The game ticket was the same color as the seat that it represented, and the signs in the lobby for that section were the same color as the seat and the ticket. Before the 1980 baseball season, they were replaced with red (upper deck), green (mezzanine), blue (loge), and orange (field level) plastic seats.

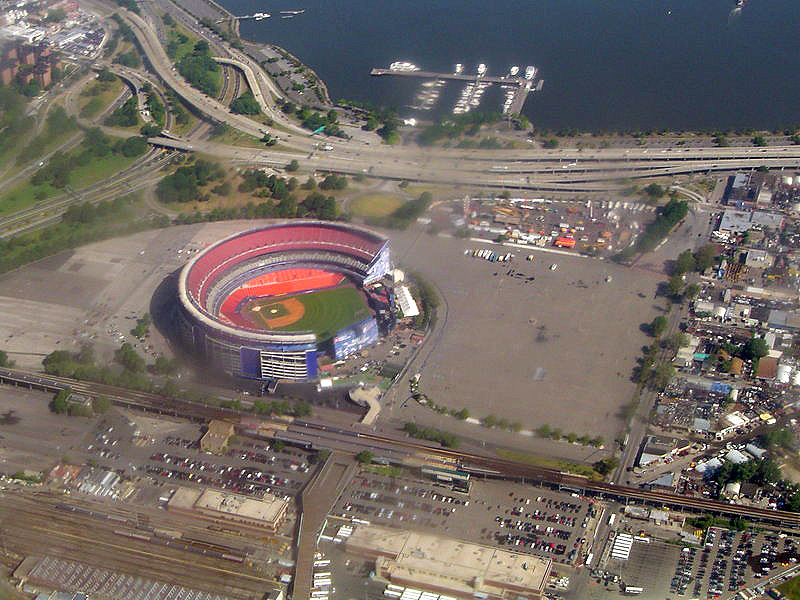
Shea Stadium in 2005

Unlike Yankee Stadium, Shea was built on an open field, so there was no need to have it conform to the surrounding streets.

Before Shea Stadium closed in 2008, it was the only stadium in the major leagues with orange foul poles. This tradition is carried on at Citi Field as the foul poles there are the same color.

In 2003, large murals celebrating the Mets' two world championships were added, covering the two ends of the grandstand. The 1986 mural was removed after the 2006 season because of deterioration (the wall was re-painted solid blue, and a window was opened on the mezzanine level where fans could view the progress of Citi Field), but the 1969 mural survived until the final game at the end of 2008.

The skyline from Shea's scoreboard, now on top of the Shake Shack in Citi Field

With its refurbishment in 1988, the scoreboard was topped by a representation of the New York Skyline, a prominent part of the team logo. After the September 11 terrorist attack, the Twin Towers of the World Trade Center were kept unlit, with a red-white-and-blue ribbon placed over them. The scoreboard was demolished in October 2008, but the skyline was preserved and is now located on the Shake Shack in Citi Field's "Taste Of The City" food court behind the giant scoreboard in center field.

During the 2007 and 2008 seasons, the construction of Citi Field was visible beyond the left and center field walls of Shea.

From 1973 to 1979, fans could estimate the distance of home run balls, since there were several signs beyond the outfield wall giving the distance in feet from home plate, in addition to the nine markers within the field.

=== Home Run Apple ===
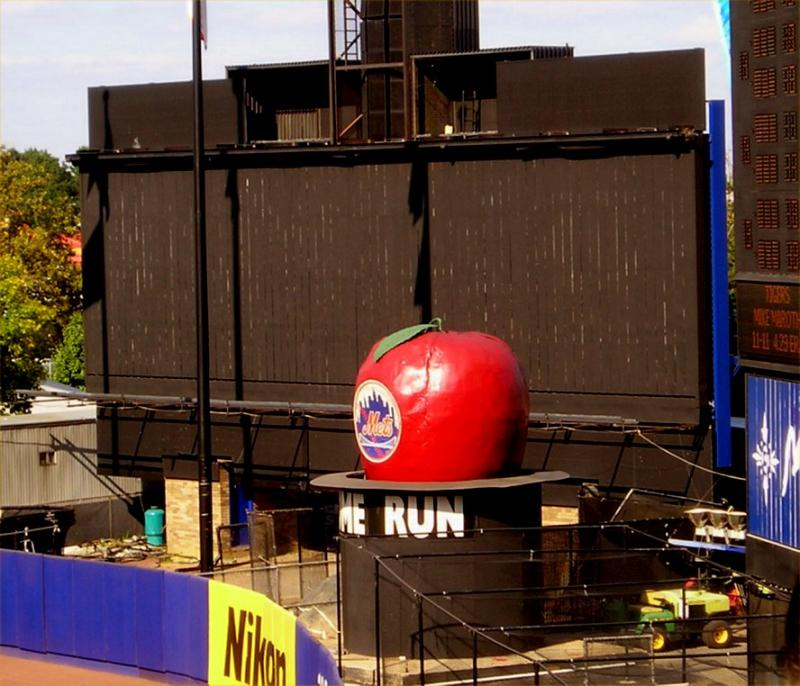
Shea's home run apple

The Home Run Apple came out of a magic hat after every Mets home run at Shea Stadium. It was first installed in May 1980 as a symbol of the Mets' advertising slogan "The Magic Is Back!" (the hat originally said "Mets Magic" in script but was changed in the mid-1980s to a simple "Home Run" in block capital letters). A bigger apple was placed in center field at Citi Field. The original apple was installed inside Citi Field's bullpen gate and was visible from outside, on 126th Street. In 2010, the original Shea apple was relocated outside the Citi Field, in front of the Jackie Robinson Rotunda.

=== Seating capacity ===
Baseball
Years	Capacity
1964–1984	55,300
1985–1993	55,601
1994–2001	55,777
2002–2003	56,749
2004	57,405
2005	57,369
2006–2008	57,333

Football
Years	Capacity
1964–1983	60,372

== Homages ==
Attractions and geographical features of Flushing Meadows–Corona Park
Attractions and geographical features of Flushing Meadows–Corona Park:
1 Citi Field
2 Etihad Park (under construction)
3 Flushing Meadows Carousel and Queens Zoo
4 Flushing Meadows Corona Park Aquatics Center
5 Flushing River and Creek
6 Meadow Lake and Hong Kong Dragon Boat Festival
7 Metropolitan Park (planned) and Shea Stadium (demolished)
8 Mets–Willets Point subway station
9 Mets–Willets Point LIRR station
10 National Tennis Center and United States Pavilion (demolished)
11 New York Hall of Science
12 New York State Pavilion and Queens Theatre
13 Queens Botanical Garden
14 Queens Museum
15 Queens Night Market
16 Terrace on the Park
17 Unisphere
18 Willow Lake
19 World's Fair subway station (demolished)

Four players in the National League named their children after Shea Stadium.

- Former Atlanta Braves third baseman Chipper Jones named his second son Shea after Jones' success in Shea Stadium against the Mets; he hit 19 home runs there, more than any other road park.
- Former Cincinnati Reds shortstop Barry Larkin named his eldest daughter Brielle D'Shea, as he enjoyed playing at Shea Stadium.
- Former Houston Astros third baseman Gary Cooper named his youngest daughter Shea. He also named his son Camden after Camden Yards in Baltimore.
- Former New York Mets third baseman David Wright named his first daughter Olivia Shea. Wright spent his entire baseball career playing for the Mets.

John Matlock, who played center for the Jets at the stadium, named his daughter Shea. Major League pitcher Shea Spitzbarth was named after the stadium. Actor Kevin James, a devoted Mets fan, named his youngest daughter Shea Joelle. Major League catcher Shea Langeliers was named after the stadium.

Events and tenants
Preceded by Polo Grounds	Home of the New York Mets; 1964–2008	Succeeded by Citi Field
Preceded by Polo Grounds	Home of the New York Jets; 1964–1983	Succeeded by Giants Stadium
Preceded by Yankee Stadium	Home of the New York Yankees; 1974–1975	Succeeded by Yankee Stadium
Preceded by Yale Bowl	Home of the New York Giants; 1975	Succeeded by Giants Stadium
Preceded by Municipal Stadium	Host of the All-Star Game; 1964	Succeeded by Metropolitan Stadium
