= Gauge =

Gauge (/ˈɡeɪdʒ/ GAYJ) may refer to:

== Measurement ==
- Gauge (instrument), any of a variety of measuring instruments
- Gauge (firearms)
- Wire gauge, a measure of the size of a wire
  - American wire gauge, a common measure of nonferrous wire diameter, especially electrical
  - Birmingham gauge, a measure of ferrous wire and hypodermic needle diameter
  - Jewelry wire gauge, the size of wire used in jewelry making
- Sheet metal gauge, thickness of metal in sheet form
- Film gauge, a physical property of film stock which defines its size
- The size of objects used in stretching (body piercing), especially earrings
- Gauge block, a metal or ceramic block of precisely known dimension, used in measuring
- Sight glass, also known as a water gauge, for measuring liquid level heights in storage tanks and pressure vessels
- Boost gauge, a gauge used in conjunction with turbo-super-chargers
- Pressure gauge or vacuum gauge, see pressure measurement
- Gauge pressure, pressure above ambient pressure
- Stream gauge, for measuring height and discharge of a river or stream
- Air core gauge, a type of rotary actuator often used in automotive instruments
- Gauger, one who gauges or measures, typically dutiable commodities, such as wine, landed from ships at docks

== Sizes ==
=== Railway practice ===
- Track gauge, the distance between the two rails forming a railway track
- Loading gauge, the maximum width and height of vehicles (engines, loaded wagons, etc.).
- Structure gauge, the minimum size of bridges, tunnels, platforms, etc.
- Axle load, the weight that an axle exerts on track
- Variable gauge, system to allow railway vehicles to travel across a break of gauge

=== Medicine ===
- Birmingham gauge, for metal wire and tube products
- French gauge, mainly for catheters

== Mathematics and physics ==
- Gauge theory
- Gauge integral
- Gauge fixing
- Gauge boson
- Gauge (Minkowski functional)

== Other uses ==
- Gauge (knitting), the number of stitches in a given length
- Gauge (actress), American pornographic actress
- Gauge (band), post-hardcore band from Chicago, Illinois, USA
- Gauge, Inc., a manufacturer of microphones and audio accessories
- Change of gauge (aviation), when an aircraft type changes at a stopping point of a direct flight
- Gauge (software), cross-platform test automation tool

== See also ==
- Gage (disambiguation)
- Gaige (disambiguation)
