= Gaige Homestead =

Historic house in New York, United States

- U.S. National Register of Historic Places
- Location within New York Location within the United States
- Location: Weaver Rd., Duanesburg, New York
- Coordinates: 42°44′53″N 74°9′9″W
- Area: 71 acres (29 ha)
- Built: c. 1830
- Architectural style: Federal, Vernacular Federal
- MPS: Duanesburg MRA
- NRHP reference No.: 84003202
- Added to NRHP: October 11, 1984

Gaige Homestead is a historic home located at Duanesburg in Schenectady County, New York. The house was built about 1830 and is a rectangular two-story, five-bay frame building in a vernacular Federal style. It has a one-story, gable roofed side wing. It features a gable roof with cornice returns, a recessed central entrance, and two brick interior end chimneys. Also on the property are two sheds, a carriage house, and a shop building.

The property was covered in a 1984 study of Duanesburg historical resources. It was listed on the National Register of Historic Places in 1984.
