= Jeremy Gaige =

American chess archivist and journalist

Personal information
- Born: October 9, 1927 New York City, New York
- Died: February 19, 2011 (aged 83) Philadelphia, Pennsylvania

Chess career
- Country: United States

Jeremy Gaige (October 9, 1927 in New York – February 19, 2011) was an American chess archivist and journalist. He was best known for his work collecting and publishing tournament results and basic biographical data on chess players. Hooper and Whyld called his works "scrupulously written" and "a source of reference for chess journalists and writers all over the world". Gaige's 1969 book, A Catalog of Chess Players and Problemists, contained about 3000 names with dates and places of birth and death. Chess writers soon began sending him information, and Chess Personalia (1987), his greatly expanded follow up, listed about 14,000 names with dates and places of birth and death, along with references to sources of biographical information. He died of emphysema on 19 February 2011, at his home in Philadelphia.

Gaige graduated from Phillips Academy and Columbia College in 1951, after serving in the US Army Medical Corps.

== Works ==
- A Catalog of Chess Players and Problemists. (1969)
- Chess Tournament Crosstables, vol I, 1851–1900. (1969)
- Chess Tournament Crosstables, vol II, 1851–1900. (1971)
- Chess Tournament Crosstables, vol III, 1901–1920. (1972)
- Chess Tournament Crosstables, vol IV, 1921–1931. (1974)
- Chess Tournaments - A Checklist: Vol I: 1849-1950 (1984)
- Chess Tournaments - A Checklist: Vol II: 1951-1980 (1984)
- Chess Tournament Crosstables, vol I, 1851–1900. (1985). Revised version of the 1969 edition.
- FIDE-Titled Correspondence Players (1985)
- Catalog of British Chess Personalia (1985)
- Oxford-Cambridge Chess Matches (1873–1987) (1987)
- Chess Personalia—A Biobibliography. (1987), reprinted (2005). McFarland. ISBN 0-7864-2353-6
- Catalog of USA Chess Composers (1987)
- Swiss Chess Personalia (1987)
- FIDE-titled composers (1988)
- Problemist obituary index (1989)
- Chess Personalia—A Biobibliography. (1989). Private circulated update of the 1987 edition.
- Index of obituaries in the British Chess Magazine 1881-1988 (1989)
- British FIDE and ICCF titleholders (1989)
- FIDE Female Titleholders (1991)
- USA FIDE-Titled Players & Arbiters (1993).
- Chess Personalia—A Biobibliography. (1994). Private circulated update of the 1987 edition.
