= Julia C. Gage =

American cancer epidemiologist

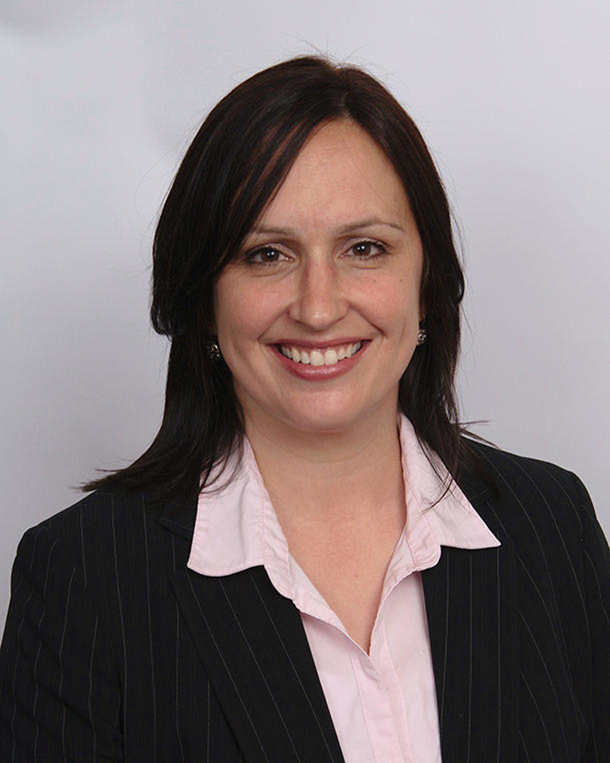
- Gage in 2019
- Education: Grinnell College; Milken Institute School of Public Health; Johns Hopkins Bloomberg School of Public Health
- Scientific career
- Fields: Cancer epidemiology, cervical screening, HPV
- Workplaces: National Cancer Institute
- Doctoral advisor: Janet Holbrook

Julia C. Gage is an American cancer epidemiologist who researches cervical screening and the human papillomavirus infection. She is a staff scientist in the clinical genetics branch at the National Cancer Institute.

== Early life and education ==
Gage completed a B.A. in political science with a concentration in Latin American studies from Grinnell College in 1995. From October 1996 to August 1998, she worked for AFL–CIO as an Organizing Institute apprentice and later a union organizer for the Service Employees International Union. Gage worked for the Maxwell Stamp, Inc. in Washington, D.C. as a business development and research assistant from September 1998 to March 2000.

From March 2000 to February 2002, Gage was a research assistant and consultant in the non-communicable disease program of the Pan American Health Organization where she primarily used Spanish and designed study protocols. In 2001, she earned a M.P.H. in international health promotion from the George Washington Milken Institute School of Public Health. Between September 2002 to August 2004, Gage worked at the Health Resources and Services Administration, first as a scholar and then as a public health analyst in the office of data and information management in the Maternal and Child Health Bureau.

In 2005, Gage joined the National Cancer Institute's (NCI) division of cancer epidemiology and genetics (DCEG) as a pre-doctoral fellow while pursuing a Ph.D. in epidemiology at the Johns Hopkins Bloomberg School of Public Health. She completed her Ph.D. in epidemiology in 2008. Her dissertation was titled, An evaluation of visual triage of human papillomavirus-positive women. Janet Holbrook was her doctoral advisor and Mark Schiffman of NCI was her mentor. Gage completed a postdoctoral fellowship at the NCI, first in the hormonal and reproductive epidemiology branch, and then in the clinical genetics branch (CGB).

== Career ==
Gage has worked as a staff scientist in the CGB since 2014. She works on projects with Nicolas Wentzensen, Philip E. Castle, and Schiffman. Gage is focused on translating discoveries regarding the natural history of human papillomavirus (HPV) into improved screening and diagnosis for cervical precancer. In particular, she investigates improved targeting of underlying precancer through HPV tests and biomarkers. Gage also pursues scientific investigations to identify and bring new technologies for cervical cancer prevention to low medical resource settings. Along with Wentzensen, Gage serves as co-investigator for multiple studies within the DCEG collaboration with Kaiser Permanente of Northern California (KPNC). She is a co-investigator of the Improving Risk Informed HPV Screening (IRIS) Study, involving HPV and cytology specimens from over 77,000 participants.

Under the leadership of Schiffman, Gage is part of a team of investigators at the NCI and the National Library of Medicine developing a simple, low-cost visual cervical screening method called automated visual evaluation (AVE). She leads the development of a deep learning algorithm that will inform clinical management decisions when testing positive. Gage serves as lead NCI investigator under the direction of Schiffman to evaluate the effectiveness and cost-effectiveness of cervical screening and triage strategies in the Management of Risk of Cervical Cancer (MARCO) project. Under the supervision of Castle, division of cancer prevention, Gage is the lead NCI scientist for an NCI grant-funded cross-sectional study of HPV screening and triage strategies among 5,000 women living with HIV. She is also the lead NCI scientist on a second Rwandan study of the impact of prophylactic HPV vaccination on HPV immunity and HPV infection in women living with HIV. Gage received the Hubert H. Humphrey Award for Service to America in 2022.

== See also ==
- List of George Washington University alumni
- List of Grinnell College alumni
- List of Johns Hopkins University people
