= Aunt Polly's Wash Tub =

Lake in Oconomowoc, Wisconsin, United States

Aunt Polly’s Wash Tub
- Soft Water Lake
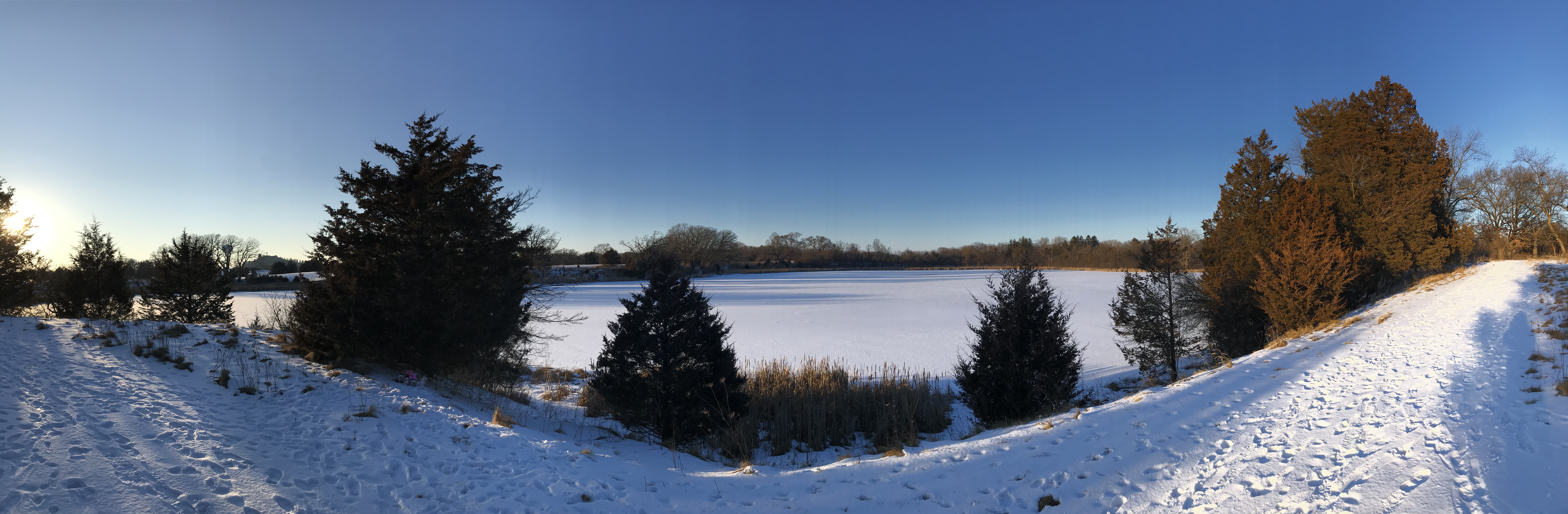

- Location within Wisconsin
- Location: Wisconsin
- Coordinates: 43°5′5.1486″N 88°27′49.3294″W
- Primary inflows: none
- Primary outflows: none
- Average depth: 10 feet (3.0 m)
- Islands: none
- Settlements: Oconomowoc, formerly Summit

Aunt Polly’s Wash Tub is a lake in Oconomowoc, Wisconsin. It is the only lake in the area that has soft water.

It was previously called Soft Water Lake until it was named for Polly Gage (1805–1882) who lived on the lake and took advantage of the water’s softness for the laundry of the Nashotah Mission. Gage lived there until 1880 when the property was foreclosed. The family of Laura Tallmadge (1842–1879) also lived on the lake.

The area once was called “Pabst Swamp Preserve”. After the Gages left, the son of Frederick Pabst, Fred Pabst, jr., purchased the land around the lake for Pabst Farms, and farm employees would ice skate on the lake in winter.

The lake is now in Chapman Park, which was named for former city attorney Bill Chapman.

The lake was once stocked with German carp and bullfrogs. Fred Pabst, Jr. later stocked it with goldfish.
