= John Gage =

American computer scientist (born 1942)

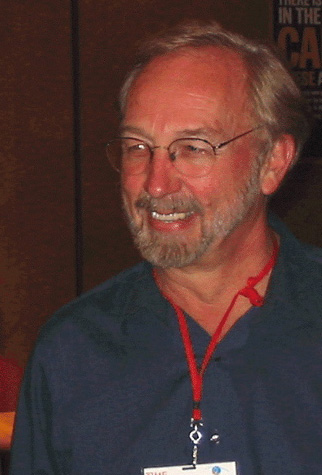
- Gage in October 2004
- Born: John Burdette Gage; October 9, 1942 (age 84); Long Beach, California, U.S.
- Education: University of California, Berkeley; Harvard Kennedy School; Harvard Business School; Newport Harbor High School; Alliance Française
- Known for: VP at Sun; Co-founder of NetDay, JavaOne
- Spouse: Linda Schacht Gage
- Awards: ACM Computing, Computerworld Smithsonian Award, Federal Networking
- Scientific career
- Fields: Computer science, water
- Workplaces: Sun Microsystems, Kleiner, Perkins, Caufield and Byers, Markle Foundation, Human Needs Project

John Burdette Gage (born October 9, 1942) is a retired computer scientist and technology executive. He was the 5th employee of Sun Microsystems, where he is credited with creating the phrase The Network is the Computer. He served as Sun's vice president and chief researcher and director of the Science Office, until leaving on June 9, 2008, to join Kleiner Perkins Caufield & Byers as a partner to work on green technologies for global warming; he departed KPCB in 2010 to apply what he had learned "to broader issues in other parts of the world".

In 2006, he joined the board of the Tegla Loroupe Peace Foundation, to build a school and orphanage in Kapenguria, in remote north-west Kenya.

In 2012, he helped build the Kibera Town Centre, a major water and community education center in the middle of Kibera, Kenya, the largest slum in Africa.

He is known as one of the co-founders of NetDay in 1995, a crowd-sourced effort to bring the Internet to every school in the world. NetDay was the first large-scale crowd-sourced mass movement on the Internet. He joined the Human Needs Project in 2012 to build a networked water source and water treatment plant in the Kibera slum in Nairobi, Kenya.

For twelve years he hosted the annual JavaOne conference, bringing 20,000 Java programmers to San Francisco and establishing the Java language in over 95% of mobile devices, and as the basis of the Android operating system.

== Background ==
Gage received his bachelor's degree in 1975 from the College of Natural Resources at the University of California, Berkeley. He also attended Harvard Kennedy School and Harvard Business School. Gage worked at Berkeley with Bill Joy, the person largely responsible for the authorship of Berkeley UNIX, also known as BSD, from which spring many modern forms of UNIX, including Solaris, FreeBSD, NetBSD, and OpenBSD. Gage helped found Sun Microsystems in 1982 with Bill Joy and others.

Gage is one of the central figures in Mark Kitchell's film Berkeley in the Sixties, recounting Berkeley's Free Speech Movement. He appears in American Stories: the American Dream: A Future Reborn 1918–1945, a five-part Discovery Channel documentary produced by Atlantic Productions.

In June 2008, Gage retired from Sun Microsystems and joined Kleiner Perkins as a venture capitalist along with Al Gore. He left Kleiner Perkins in 2010.

Gage has served on scientific advisory panels for the US National Research Council, the US National Academy of Sciences, the United Nations, the World Bank, and the World Economic Forum.

He was appointed by President Bill Clinton to the Web Based Education Commission in 2000.

He served on the US National Academy of Sciences Committee on Scientific Communication and National Security and on the Markle Foundation Task Force on National Security, whose reports aided in reorganizing US intelligence agencies after the September 11 attacks. He has served on the boards of the US National Library of Medicine, of FermiLab, the Berkeley Mathematical Sciences Research Institute, and other scientific and educational groups.

Currently he serves on the Malaysian International Advisory Panel, the Malaysian Global Science Advisory Panel and on the advisory boards of the University of California, Berkeley, Goldman School of Public Policy, the Oxford Martin School for the Twenty-first Century, the Center for Information Technology in the Interest of Society (CITRIS) at Berkeley, and of Liquid Robotics, who build unmanned ocean surface robots. He is on the boards of the Tegla Loroupe Peace Foundation in Nairobi, the Human Needs Project, and Relief International, an international humanitarian disaster relief organization.

== Early life ==
Gage was born on October 9, 1942, in Long Beach, California. His father was James Robert Gage, born in Woodville, East Texas, and president of the UCLA Class of 1935, captain in the United States Navy, and senior manager for Douglas Aircraft in Long Beach, then for McDonnell Douglas Aerospace in Seal Beach. His mother was Harriet Doris Burdette, born in Hollywood, California, whose grandfather crossed the Panama Isthmus to arrive in California in 1848. She taught in the Los Angeles school district. He has two siblings, James Collier Gage of Honolulu, Hawaii, and Laurie Gage, chief veterinarian for the Marine Mammal Center in Marin County, and US Department of Agriculture big cat and marine mammal expert.

== Education ==
Gage was educated at Gardner Street Elementary School and LeConte Junior High School in Hollywood, California. In 1956, the family moved to Newport Beach, California. Gage attended Ensign Middle School and Newport Harbor High School, where he was student body president, All-American swimmer, and National Merit Scholar. He received the Harvard Book Award, and graduated in 1960.

Gage entered the University of California, Berkeley, in the fall of 1960, in Honors Mathematics. In 1961, he entered the Alliance Française in Paris, then studied at the Université de Paris. Returning to Berkeley, he became deeply involved in the Free Speech Movement, as documented in Berkeley in the Sixties. He created the first Community Projects Office for the Associated Students of the University of California, placing over 2,000 students in volunteer roles in schools and community organizations in Oakland and Berkeley.

He was a three-time All-American swimmer and Pacific Coast champion in the 100-yard breaststroke. He played on the Pacific Coast champion water polo team. He was a member of the Order of the Golden Bear and the Big C Society. In 1968, he joined six other students from California on the delegation assembled by Speaker of the California Assembly, Jesse Unruh, as a Robert F. Kennedy delegate to the Chicago Democratic Convention.

In the fall of 1968, after the Democratic Convention in Chicago, he entered the Harvard Business School. After one year, he transferred to Harvard Kennedy School. He took leave to work on the George McGovern presidential campaign. After the McGovern campaign, he returned to the University of California, Berkeley, where he completed his bachelor's degree in 1975, and entered the Ph.D. program in Mathematical Economics at the University of California, Berkeley. He left the Ph.D. program in 1982 to help found Sun Microsystems along with a few others.

== Political activity ==
Following the Free Speech Movement, Gage became active in opposing the war in Vietnam. He worked on the Robert Scheer for Congress campaign in 1966, almost defeating a Democratic congressman who supported the war. He co-chaired the Robert F. Kennedy for President campaign in 1968 in Alameda County, and was a Robert Kennedy delegate to the 1968 Chicago Convention, representing Berkeley and Oakland.

At Harvard, he helped form the Vietnam Moratorium Committee with Sam Brown, David Hawk, Marge Sklenkar, and David Mixner, and co-chaired the New England division. He organized the 125,000 person Boston Common Vietnam Moratorium demonstration in October. and coordinated the 400,000 person Vietnam Moratorium demonstration on the Washington Monument grounds in Washington, D.C. Nationwide, the Vietnam Moratorium was the largest mass demonstration in US history, with over two million people involved.

He organized a number of major antiwar demonstrations in Boston, in New York, in Washington, D.C., and in Philadelphia. In 1972, he was named by White House attorney John Dean to Nixon's Enemies List.

He was the first field organizer for students for the McGovern Presidential campaign in California, then joined the national campaign as assistant press secretary and trip director, working for Frank Mankiewicz. In that role, he coordinated the day-to-day movement of the press and staff from event to event nationwide with John Podesta and others. In the 1976 Jimmy Carter campaign, he helped train staff, and organized the final rallies in California. In the 1980 Ted Kennedy campaign, he was assistant national press secretary and trip director, and member of the traveling party.

In 2008, Gage spent several weeks in Ankeny, Iowa, organizing for the 2008 Barack Obama campaign.

== Concert activity ==
In 1969, Gage was asked by Bill Hanley, the owner of Hanley Sound, the staging and sound system used at Woodstock, and the system Gage used in Washington, D.C. for the Vietnam Moratorium, to come to Palm Beach, Florida, to take over producing the International Palm Beach Music and Art Festival. B.B. King, Janis Joplin, the Rolling Stones, Sly and the Family Stone, Jefferson Airplane, the Byrds, Sha-Na-Na, Country Joe and the Fish, Steppenwolf, Johnny Winter, Sweetwater and twenty other groups performed; there had been strong opposition from the Governor of Florida, local law enforcement, and some local churches. Heavy rain and unusual cold did not stop some career-best performances, and crowds up to 100,000 people. This Rolling Stones appearance came just six days before the notorious Altamont Free Concert.

Subsequently, Gage was called to rescue the Louisiana Celebration of Life Festival after two people had drowned; produced the New York Shea Stadium Festival for Peace Concert with Peter Yarrow, Janis Joplin, Creedence Clearwater Revival, Herbie Hancock, Miles Davis, Dionne Warwick, Paul Simon, Sha-Na-Na, Johnny Winter, and fifteen more, the Philadelphia Peace Concert, and several other events involving over 100,000 people.

== Computer career ==
In 1980, Gage was part of the Homebrew Computer Club, with Steve Jobs, Steve Wozniak, Lee Felsenstein and others.

In 1982, Gage joined Bill Joy, Andy Bechtolsheim, Vinod Khosla, Scott McNealy and others to found Sun Microsystems. He was responsible for all external relations, including marketing, sales, and technical support to customers. As Sun Microsystems grew, Gage became the Vice President and Director of the Science Office, with responsibility for scientific computing, networking, and relationships with universities, scientific laboratories, international scientific bodies, national intelligence agencies, and multilateral agencies including the World Bank and the United Nations. Gage testified often to the US Congress, to United Nations ECOSOC meetings, and was part of numerous United Nations special commissions.

In 1994, with Professor Jianping Wu of Tsinghua University, Gage helped build the Network Research Center in the Tsinghua Main Administration Center, which became CERNET, linking over 1,000 Chinese universities.

In 1995, at the Technology, Entertainment, and Design Conference (TED6) in Monterey, California, Gage and James Gosling announced and Gage demonstrated for the first time the Java programming language, creating the first interactive interface for the World Wide Web. In 2002, Gage joined the United Nations Information and Communication Technologies Task Force, to bring networking to all nations. In 2006, Gage joined the UN Digital Health Taskforce. For the World Economic Forum, he helped organize the Jordan Network Initiative with John Chambers of Cisco and Eric Schmidt of Google.

In 2002, Sun Microsystems reached $25 billion (2015 USD) in revenues.

In 2010, Oracle purchased Sun Microsystems.

== Academic career ==
In 2000, Gage spent a year at the Harvard Kennedy School of Public Policy as a Shorenstein Fellow. He taught a class of 90 students entitled "Technology, Journalism and Politics", for which he won the "Most Influential Course" award, awarded by Dean Joseph Nye.

== NetDay ==
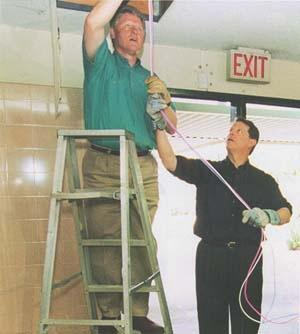
President Bill Clinton installing computer cables with Vice President Al Gore on NetDay at Ygnacio Valley High School in Concord, California, March 9, 1996

Gage founded NetDay in 1995 with Michael Kaufman and several others. NetDay was the first crowd sourcing event organized using the Internet.

Gage created zoomable maps of the 140,000 schools in the United States, placing a meter-accurate dot for each school, color-coded for whether or not the school was connected to the Internet. He created a web-based sign-up page for each school, and "called on high-tech companies to commit resources to schools, libraries, and clinics worldwide so that they could connect to the Internet." At some schools, hundreds of volunteers signed up, promising to come to the school on Saturday, March 9, 1996, to install Ethernet cables to five classrooms and the library. On the first NetDay in California, over 100,000 engineers wired 4,000 schools. President Clinton and Vice-president Gore pulled cables throughout Ygnacio Valley High School. Over the next year, over 70,000 schools across the United States held NetDays to wire their schools, and NetDay spread to Korea, Great Britain, France, and other countries.

In the first state, California, over 100,000 volunteers wired 4,000 schools in one day: March 9, 1996. NetDay was endorsed by President Bill Clinton and Vice President Al Gore, active participants in NetDay '96. Over the next two years, over 70,000 US K-12 schools held NetDays, and Korea, Great Britain, France and other countries held national NetDays.

In 1998, Gage was awarded the ACM Presidential Award by Chuck House, the President of the ACM for his work on NetDay.

== Human Needs Project ==
Gage joined Connie Nielsen and David Warner in 2012 to build a large community center in Kibera, Nairobi, Kenya. The Kibera Town Centre is a research platform and learning center, applying new and innovative technologies to provide clean water and waste water treatment in a huge urban slum. The Kibera Town Centre borehole can provide over 400 cubic meters of pure water a day to the 1,000 square-meter facility, which serves over 1,000+ people a day with a combination of educational and career services, showers, toilets, laundry, cafe, and financial services, and provides educational materials to the 4,000 students of neighboring Olympic Primary School, Kenya's largest primary school.

The facility is connected to high-speed fiber optic cable, and has built a half-gigabit wireless network for Kibera.

== Family ==
Gage is married to Linda Schacht Gage, a lecturer in journalism at the University of California, Berkeley, and has two children: Peter Gage, formerly with the US Department of Energy, now with Renewable Finance, and Kate Gage, who helped create the USAID Global Development Laboratory, and is now Senior Policy Advisor, International Science and Technology, in the Office of Science and Technology, White House.

== Publications ==
- Information Technology and Economic Development, in Economic Development, Oxford University Press, 1999.
- Workstations in Science, with Bill Joy in AAAS Science 26 April 1985, Vol 228.

== Sunergy Television broadcasts ==
Gage did more than fifty satellite television programs on technology that were broadcast worldwide from Moscow, Rio, Mexico City, Beijing, Zurich, Mauna Kea, Berlin, Santiago, Kuala Lumpur, Cape Town, San Francisco, Paris, London, and other cities.

"Moscow and Red Square": 1995

Sunergy 7: September 8, 1993 "Cyberjockying in the 21st Century": Dr. Whitfield Diffie, Carl Malamud, Brewster Kahle, Larry Irving

Sunergy 8: "Internet" Dr. Eric Schmidt, Dr. Vinton Cerf, Geoffrey Baehr

Sunergy 12: January 24, 1995 "Information Highway Access: With Liberty and Justice for All?" Dr. Robert Kahn, Mike Nelson, Eric Schmidt, Deborah Kaplan, Marshall Rose, Wendell Bailey

"The Changing Fabric Of Telecommunications" (Sunergy 33), "Next Generation Networking" (Sunergy 25), and "Network Devices Brought to Life" (Sunergy 32)
