= Fred Kelton Gage =

American politician (1902–1951)

Fred Kelton Gage (December 12, 1902 – October 21, 1951) was an American lawyer and politician.

Gage was born in Cottage Grove, Washington County, Minnesota and graduated from Lindstrom High School in Lindstrom, Minnesota. He graduated from Minnesota College of Law (now William Mitchell College of Law) and was admitted to the Minnesota bar. Gage served in the United States Navy during World War II and was commissioned a lieutenant. He lived in Fairfax, Renville County, Minnesota with his wife and family and served as the Fairfax Village Attorney. Gage also served in the Minnesota Senate from 1939 to 1946. His son Kelly Gage also served in the Minnesota Senate. Gage was killed with his wife in an automobile accident on U.S. Route 169 in Minnesota five miles south of Belle Plaine, Minnesota.
