= Murder of Jetseta Gage =

American murder victim (1994–2005)

Jetseta Gage
- Jetseta Gage, c. 2005
- Born: Jetseta Marrie Gage; August 25, 1994
- Died: March 24, 2005 (aged 10)
- Cause of death: Homicide by asphyxia
- Resting place: Murdoch-Linwood Cemetery, Linn County, Iowa, U.S. 41.95639°N 91.67520°W (approximate)
- Occupation: Student
- Known for: Child murder victim

Jetseta Marrie Gage (August 25, 1994 – March 24, 2005) was an American child whose kidnapping, rape and murder prompted major changes in sentencing laws for those who commit child sex crimes in Iowa. Roger Bentley, a convicted sex offender and friend of Gage's family, was arrested in connection with 10-year-old Jetseta's death. He was convicted of first-degree murder and first-degree kidnapping on January 31, 2006. On February 24, he was sentenced to two consecutive mandatory sentences of life in prison without parole.

== Murder ==
Prosecutors alleged that Bentley took Gage from her home to a run-down trailer in rural Johnson County, Iowa, where he raped and killed her. An Amber alert was issued shortly after it was noticed that she was missing. The Amber alert program had errors that night. A proper description with name and picture did not appear until hours after she had vanished. Bentley was arrested a day later. Investigators found her body under a bathroom sink in the trailer.

Bentley's trial was moved to Scott County on the defense's change of venue motion because of extensive pre-trial publicity; local media dubbed the case "Justice for Jetseta." During his trial, prosecutors linked DNA evidence found on Gage's body to Bentley, while the defense (which did not call any witnesses) claimed there were no eyewitnesses to the crime or direct evidence. It took just over two hours for the jury to arrive at its guilty verdict.

Bentley's brother, 34-year-old James Bentley, was indicted in November 2004 on felony sexual abuse charges after authorities alleged he sexually abused Gage between 2002 and 2004. The Bentley brothers were not strangers to the family. Gage's mother had dated both men and allowed the brothers contact with her children. James Bentley was found guilty of second-degree sexual abuse at the Clarke County courthouse in Osceola, Iowa, on August 1, 2008. On March 1, 2007, a federal judge in Cedar Rapids found James Bentley guilty of six counts of child pornography and sexual exploitation charges in a separate trial. Bentley was accused of taking explicit photos of Gage and another infant girl in late 2003 and transporting those photos with him to Arkansas shortly afterward. He was sentenced to life in prison without parole on June 12, 2007.

Writers and broadcasters affiliated with the Associated Press named the Jetseta Gage murder as Iowa's top news story of 2005.

== Reaction ==
In 2005, the Iowa General Assembly passed a bill extending prison sentences and strengthening supervision of sex offenders – through methods such as electronic monitoring – upon their release from prison. Numerous local governments throughout the state moved swiftly to enact stricter residency restrictions for sex offenders. Like a number of other states, Iowa already had a moratorium barring those on the sex offender registry from living within 2,000 feet (610 m) of a school or state-registered day care center, and local officials proposed expanding the buffer zone to such child-oriented places as libraries, parks and swimming pools. While some cities and county governments passed such ordinances, other governments – such as the city of Davenport and Scott County – were cool to the proposal and ultimately did not enact the tighter restrictions.

Critics contended that the stricter residency proposals had several flaws, most notably:

- Those on the sex offender registry for less-severe cases – such as a 19-year-old boy charged after having consensual sex with his 15-year-old girlfriend – would face the same residency restrictions as a violent predator.
- It would not prevent offenders from going to a school (e.g., to attend a sporting event) or other locations covered by the proposed residency restrictions; rather, it would merely preclude them from declaring residency near those places.

In January 2006, 45 members of the Iowa Senate – 23 Democrats and 22 Republicans – co-sponsored a bill increasing the penalties for those convicted of certain sex crimes, including lascivious acts with a child and sexual exploitation of a minor. Under the proposal, a first-time offender would face a mandatory minimum 25-year prison sentence upon conviction.

Many Iowans, including the Gage family, have called for a restoration of the death penalty, particularly for crimes in which children are raped and killed. Iowa abolished capital punishment in 1965, and is one of 12 states that currently do not have a death penalty. A GOP-sponsored bill failed to pass in 2005, and future attempts to pass a death penalty for certain crimes never resulted in a bill being passed.

== See also ==
- List of kidnappings
- List of solved missing person cases (2000s)
