= Delwyn Gage =

American politician (1930–2025)

Majority Leader of the Montana Senate
- In office 1989–1991
- Preceded by: Fred Van Valkenburg
- Succeeded by: Fred Van Valkenburg

Member of the Montana Senate from the 5th district
- In office 1982–1998

Personal details
- Born: Delwyn Orin Gage; November 28, 1930 Calvin, North Dakota, U.S.
- Died: July 8, 2025 (aged 94) Billings, Montana, U.S.
- Party: Republican
- Spouse: Sarah Marlene Brenchley
- Education: Brigham Young University
- Profession: Politician, accountant, businessman

Military service
- Allegiance: United States
- Branch/service: United States Marine Corps
- Battles/wars: Korean War

Delwyn Orin Gage (November 28, 1930 – July 8, 2025) was an American politician, accountant, and businessman who served in the Montana Senate from 1982 to 1998, representing the 5th legislative district of Montana as a Republican. He served as Senate Majority Leader from 1989 to 1991. (Note: According to Vote Smart, Gage served as Senate Majority Leader from 1989 to 1990.)

== Early life and education ==
Gage was born in Calvin, North Dakota on November 28, 1930. He attended Brigham Young University.

== Career ==
Gage served in the Korean War as a member of the United States Marine Corps.

Gage served in the Montana Senate from 1982 to 1998, representing the 5th legislative district of Montana as a Republican. He served as Senate Majority Leader from 1989 to 1991.

Gage ran unopposed in the 1990 Montana Senate elections.

Outside of politics, Gage worked as an accountant and businessman.

== Political positions ==
Gage received an 88% rating from the National Federation of Independent Business in 1996.

== Personal life ==
Gage resided in Bigfork, Montana. He previously resided in Cut Bank, Montana.

Gage was married to Sarah Marlene Brenchley, who pre-deceased him. They had six children.

Gage died in Billings, Montana on July 8, 2025, at the age of 94.

== Electoral history ==
1990 Montana Senate District 5 general election
Party	Candidate	Votes	%
Republican	Delwyn Gage	4,082	100.0
Total votes		4,082	100.0
Republican hold			

== Notes ==
Montana Senate
Preceded by —	Member of the Montana Senate from the 5th district 1982–1998	Succeeded by —
Montana Senate
Preceded by Fred Van Valkenburg	Majority Leader of the Montana Senate; 1989–1991	Succeeded by Fred Van Valkenburg
