= Kelly Gage =

American lawyer and politician (1925–2017)

Member of the Minnesota Senate from the 11th district
- In office January 3, 1967 – January 1, 1973

Personal details
- Born: Fred Kelton Gage Jr. June 20, 1925 Minneapolis, Minnesota, U.S.
- Died: October 5, 2017 (aged 92) Mankato, Minnesota, U.S.
- Party: Republican
- Parent: Fred Kelton Gage (father)
- Education: University of Minnesota Law School
- Profession: Politician, lawyer

Military service
- Allegiance: United States
- Branch/service: United States Navy
- Years of service: 1943–1946
- Battles/wars: World War II

Fred Kelton Gage, Jr. (June 20, 1925 – October 5, 2017) was an American lawyer and politician.

== Biography ==
Kelly Gage was born in Minneapolis, Minnesota. He served in the United States Navy during World War II. Gage received his law degree from the University of Minnesota Law School in 1950. Gage practiced law in Mankato, Minnesota. Gage served on the Mankato School Board from 1957 to 1966. Gage also served on the Minnesota State College Board and the Metropolitan Sports Facilities Authority. He served in the Minnesota Senate from 1967 to 1972 as a Republican.

Gage died in Mankato in 2017. His father, Fred Kelton Gage, also served in the Minnesota Legislature.
