= Eleanor St Clere =

Heiress of manors (born c. 1423)

- Born: c.1423
- Occupation: Heiress
- Spouse: Sir John Gage
- Children: William Gage; John Gage

Eleanor St Clere was the heiress of a substantial number of manors and grandmother of the Tudor courtier Sir John Gage KG.

== Background ==
Eleanor was one of three daughters of Thomas St Clere and his wife Margaret Hoo. Thomas had no son, so his daughters were co-heirs to the extensive properties that he held at the time of his death in 1435. Records of the investigations that took place after then are not totally consistent about Eleanor’s age but indicate that she was the second of the daughters and about 11 or 12 years old when her father died. This makes 1423 her approximate year of birth.

Thomas held much of his lands direct from the king, as tenant-in-chief. As a result, the wardship of all the property and control of the marriages of his heirs belonged to the King. However, during his lifetime, Thomas had transferred much if not all of his lands to trustees, apparently with a view to depriving the King of these benefits.

== Marriage and family ==
Eleanor married Sir John Gage, son of John Gage and his wife Joan Sudgrove. It is quite feasible that the marriage took place in 1438, when John (the son) and his widowed mother conveyed their lands to trustees. John and Eleanor were definitely married by 16 December 1445, when the properties that had been held by her father were released by the King who had evidently asserted his rights despite Thomas' attempts to frustrate them. By that stage, all three of Thomas' daughters were married.

Sir John and Eleanor were the parents of:

- William Gage
- John Gage

== Property ==
A deed dated 8 July 1446 set out the agreed partition of Thomas St Clere’s lands between his three daughters along with their respective husbands. John and Eleanor received the following share:

- In Sussex: The manors of Heighton St Clere, Hoathly & Tarring St Clere, with the advowson of Tarring.
- In Surrey: The manors of Burstow, Hedgecourt and Marden.
- In Kent: The manor of Wodeland. “Woodland alias Week” was a manor in the parish of West Kingsdown.
- In Buckinghamshire: The manor of Aston Chiverey in the parish of Aston Clinton.
- In Northamptonshire: The manor of Old (alias Wold).

== Death ==
Inquisitions post mortem that were held in 1475 after Sir John’s death established the contemporary extent of his landholdings. Orders that were issued on 28 November 1475 to the escheators for Buckinghamshire, Surrey and Sussex stated that William Gage was the son and heir of Eleanor, whom they described as the late wife of John Gage and one of the daughters and heirs of Thomas St Clere. This source confirms that Eleanor had died before her husband but the date of her death is not recorded.

== Bibliography ==
- Sinclair, Thomas (1887). The Sinclairs of England. London.
