= John Gage (15th-century landowner) =

English landowner (died 1475)

- Died: 1475
- Occupation: Landowner
- Spouse: Eleanor St Clere
- Children: William Gage; John Gage

Sir John Gage was a major English landowner and grandfather of the Tudor courtier Sir John Gage KG.

== Background ==
He was a son of John Gage and his wife Joan, heiress of John Sudgrove of Sudgrove, Gloucestershire. The marriage of his parents appears in a pedigree that was compiled in 1627 from family deeds by Richard Hoskins of the Inner Temple. In 1416-17, John Sudgrove settled his lands at Miserden and Sudgrove on John and Joan Gage and Alice, his other daughter, with her husband John Bovey. Joan survived her husband and, on 10 August 1438, she and her son John conveyed their lands in Cirencester, Nether Siddington, Miserden and Brimsfield to trustees. That transaction may have taken place in connection with the marriage of John the son.

== Marriage and family ==
John married Eleanor, a daughter of Thomas St Clere and his wife, Margaret Hoo. As Sir Thomas had no son, his three daughters were co-heirs to the extensive properties that he held at the time of his death in 1435.

Sir John and Eleanor were the parents of:

- William Gage
- John Gage

In December 1445, the properties formerly held by Thomas St Clere were released from the King's hands into which they had been taken, despite Sir Thomas' attempts to deprive the King of his rights over the property and control of the marriages of its heiresses. By that stage, all three of Sir Thomas' daughters were married.

A deed dated 8 July 1446 set out the agreed partition of Sir Thomas' lands between his three daughters and their husbands. The agreement involved John and Eleanor Gage receiving the following share:

- In Sussex: The manors of Heighton St Clere, Hoathly & Tarring St Clere, with the advowson of Tarring.
- In Surrey: The manors of Burstow, Hedgecourt and Marden.
- In Kent: The manor of Wodeland. “Woodland alias Week” was a manor in the parish of West Kingsdown.
- In Buckinghamshire: The manor of Aston Chiverey in the parish of Aston Clinton.
- In Northamptonshire: The manor of Old (alias Wold).

== Career ==
John Gage was appointed Escheator of Northamptonshire and Rutland in 1446 and described as "late escheator" of Rutland in 1448. In November 1454, "John Gauge" was one of six men appointed to enquire into various details of the manor of Geddington. In July 1461, he was granted the post of Receiver of the Duchy of Lancaster lands in Northamptonshire, Bedfordshire and Huntingdonshire "during good behaviour".

Evidence of how Hedgecourt Manor was managed by Sir John and his family has been extensively analysed by the Felbridge & District History Group.

== Death and legacy ==
Inquisitions post mortem that were held after Sir John's death, which took place on 3 September 1475, established the contemporary extent of his landholdings. On 28 November 1475, orders were issued to the escheators for Buckinghamshire, Surrey and Sussex stating that William Gage was the son and heir of Eleanor (late the wife of John Gage and one of the daughters and heirs of Thomas St Clere) and that William was now to have full seisin of those lands. The orders confirmed that Sir John had survived his wife and after her death held her lands for his own lifetime by courtesy of England.

Various accounts, in Burke's Peerage and elsewhere, report the year of Sir John's death as 1486. They appear to be based on a reference in the Visitation of Gloucestershire 1623 to a statement taken from "Howard 17, Herald's College" to the effect that his inquisition post mortem was held on 30 September 26 Edward IV (i.e. 1486). However, 1486 cannot be the correct year because the records of his inquisitions post mortem are dated 1475. Moreover, "26 Edward IV" is not a valid Regnal year, as Edward IV died on 9 April 1483.
