= Sir Philip St Clere =

- Died: 16 May 1408
- Occupation(s): Landowner and High Sheriff
- Spouse: Margaret de Loveyne
- Children: John St Clere; Thomas St Clere

Sir Philip St Clere (died 16 May 1408) was a son of Sir Philip St Clere of Ightham, Kent and Little Preston, Northamptonshire & his wife Joan de Audley. He served as High Sheriff of Surrey and Sussex and was a major landowner whose estates included land in eight English counties.

== Background and public office ==
Sir Philip was a son of Sir Philip St Clere of Ightham, Kent and Little Preston, Northamptonshire & his wife Joan, daughter of James de Audley of Wold by Margaret (daughter of Sir William de Bereford).

He was heir sometime in the period, 1387–95, to his cousin, Elizabeth de Audley, wife of John Rose, and daughter of Thomas de Audley.

In 1405, he served as High Sheriff of Surrey and Sussex.

== Marriage and family ==
Philip St Clere married Margaret, daughter of Sir Nicholas de Loveyne. It was Margaret’s second marriage, as she was the widow of Richard Chamberlain, by whom she had two sons, Richard and John.

Philip and Margaret were the parents of:

- John St Clere – married Joan Pelham.
- Thomas St Clere, Esq. – married Margaret Hoo.
- Margaret (or Margery) (wife of Thomas Pulteney, Esq.).

According to inquisitions post mortem that were held at Godstone on 26 May 1408 and at Penshurst on 21 November 1409, Margaret St Clere died on either 10 or 7 May 1408. As these dates were only a few days before her husband died, the evidence suggests that the couple may have succumbed to the same sickness.

== Death and will ==
The will of “Philip Seyntclere Knight” was made on 16 May 1406. He directed that he be buried in the chancel of Penshurst parish church. The will was proved on 26 June 1408.

A series of enquiries were held after his death to ascertain his property rights and the identity of his heir. These confirmed that Sir Philip held properties in Cambridgeshire, Kent, Leicestershire, Oxfordshire, Somerset, Suffolk, Surrey and Sussex. The dates reported for his death at these hearings were 14, 16 and 18 May 1408. As his will was dated 16 May and writs to initiate the enquiries were dated 17 May, the only plausible date of those given for his death is 16 May.

On 27 June 1408, the King charged Sir John Pelham 1000 marks for control of the manors, other property and the marriage of the heir(s) of Sir Philip St Clere until such time as an heir reached full age. The grant obliged Sir John to maintain the heir and the houses and buildings on the relevant lands.

== Property ==
Records of the inquisitions post mortem that were held during the year after Sir Philip’s death provide evidence of the large scale of his property ownership:

- In Somerset: The manor of Chiselborough.
- In Cambridgeshire: The manor of Swaffham Prior.
- In Suffolk: The manor of Withersfield.
- In Oxfordshire: The manors of Barton Steeple, Stanton St. John and Chalgrove.
- In Surrey: The manors of Lagham (in the parish of Godstone), Marden, Hedgecourt and Burstow.
- In Sussex: The manors of Lavertye, Tarring Neville, Brambletye, Jevington, Heighton and Nutbourne. Also the reversion of the manor of Exceat and lands and tenements at Newnham in Maresfield.
- In Kent: The manor of West Aldham (in the parish of Ightham), the manor of Ospringe (near Faversham), Kemsing (part) and Woodland (in the parish of West Kingsdown). Also the reversion of Lullingstone Castle.
- In Leicestershire: The manor of Ashby Magna.

In addition, for the brief period between the death of his wife and his own death, Sir Philip held the following property by courtesy of England:

- The manors of Ensfield and Penshurst
- Other property at Ashour Park, Chiddingstone, Bidborough and Leigh.

== Bibliography ==
- Lambert, Uvedale (1929). Godstone, A Parish History.
- Sinclair, Thomas (1887). The Sinclairs of England. London.
