= William Gage (15th-century landowner) =

English landowner

William Gage (15th century landowner)
- Born: c. 1447
- Died: 16 February 1496/7
- Occupation: Landowner
- Spouse: Agnes Bolney
- Children: John Gage; Margaret Gage

William Gage (about 1447 – 16 February 1496/7) was an English landowner and the father of the Tudor courtier John Gage.

== Early life ==
William Gage was the elder son of Sir John Gage and his wife Eleanor St Clere. Three sources give slightly inconsistent indications about when William was born. His age was stated to be 25 years in evidence given about Easter 1473 in connection with a legal dispute relating to the manor of Lullingstone Castle, indicating that he was born in 1447 or 1448. An inquisition post mortem held in November 1486 following the death of Thomas Hoo stated that William was "aged 40 or more", which points to his year of birth being no later than 1446. The Visitation of Northamptonshire 1618-19 states that William was “30 yere old at the deth of his father” (which took place in 1475).

== Marriage and family ==
In 1472, he married Agnes, daughter of Bartholomew Bolney, who was lord of the manor of Firle, Sussex. William's will refers to an agreement between the couple at the time of their marriage that Agnes should enjoy various properties including the manor of Heighton St Clere during her life. On 13 June 1472, a settlement of Heighton St Clere and other lands in Sussex was made by John Gage on his son William and Agnes (William's wife), which indicates that the marriage took place on or close to that day.

William and Agnes were the parents of:

- Sir John Gage
- Margaret Gage - wife of John Mills. She was mentioned in her father's will.

== Property and Pardon ==
Evidence of how Hedgecourt Manor was managed by William Gage and his forebears has been extensively analysed by the Felbridge & District History Group.

In the autumn of 1483, a rebellion erupted against the rule of Richard III, who had been crowned King on 6 July that year. This insurrection, known as "Buckingham’s rebellion", lasted for only a few weeks. William Gage was one of the rebels who were pardoned by the King, the relevant document being dated 16 December 1483.

Inquisitions post mortem that were held after William's death established that his landed holdings at that time included:

- In Sussex: The Manors of Heighton St Clere and Tarring St Clere, 50 acres of land in East Grinstead, 350 acres of land at Worth.
- In Surrey: The Manors of Burstow, Hedgecourt and Marden, 114 acres at Tandridge and 100 acres at Wolkested (now Godstone) and Horne.
- In Kent: The Manor of Wodelond. “Woodland alias Week” was a manor in the parish of West Kingsdown.
- In Buckinghamshire: The Manor of Aston Chiverley in the parish of Aston Clinton.

== Death and legacy ==
William made his will two days before he died on 16 February 1496/7 and it was proved at the Prerogative Court of Canterbury on 24 October 1497. William directed that his body be buried in the Church of the Greyfriars in London next to the tomb of William Chambleyn. He stipulated bequests to St Michael's church, Burstow; Greyfriars church; the church and priory of St Elyne, London (presumably St Helen's Bishopsgate) and to a number of named individuals, with the residue of his chattels to go to his wife Agnes.

William's will directed that Agnes should have "the custodye, guyding and rule" of their son John during his minority. However, in 1499 Robert Tate, an alderman of London, acquired the young man's wardship and the associated control of lands in Buckinghamshire, Sussex, Kent and Gloucestershire. This arrangement continued until John reached his majority.

Agnes survived her husband for four years, dying on 5 July 1501.
