= John Gage (died 1598) =

English politician (1537–1598)

John Gage (by 1537 – 1598) was an English Roman Catholic landowner and politician.

Gage was the eldest son of Sir Edward Gage of Firle, Sussex and Elizabeth, daughter of John Parker of Willingdon, Sussex. His grandfather was the courtier Sir John Gage.

He was a Member (MP) of the Parliament of England for Lewes in 1558. Nothing is known of his activity in the parliament and as a result of his religion he was to take no further public role. The following year he married Margaret, the daughter of Sir Roger Copley and sister of Thomas Copley. He succeeded his father in 1567, but as recusants he and his wife went abroad with her brother.

Gage returned to live in England in 1576. His first wife having died, he married Elizabeth, daughter of John Shelley of Michelgrove in Patching, Sussex, widow of Thomas Guildford (d. 1575) of Hemsted, Kent and sister-in-law of Gage's recusant cousin Edward Gage of Bentley, Framfield (d. 1595). Her Protestant first husband had implored Elizabeth not to bring up their children in 'papistry', but she ignored his plea. He was imprisoned in the Fleet in 1580, and when released on licence was confined to live in London with only occasional visits to Sussex and was returned to prison on occasion, notably during the invasion scare of 1588. In 1593 he was allowed to retire to Firle on health grounds, but remained under suspicion.

He died in October 1598 and was buried in St Peter's Church, Firle, where he had erected a monument to himself and his two wives. He had no surviving children by either of his wives and was succeeded by his nephew John, son of his brother Thomas, whose wardship he had secured in 1593. Although he was a considerable landowner, his religious stance had left to him amassing considerable debts. His executors included his stepson Henry Guildford.
