= Henry Beaumont (cricketer) =

English cricketer and soldier

Personal information
- Full name: Henry Beaumont
- Born: 7 October 1881; Grantham, Lincolnshire, England
- Died: 17 August 1964 (aged 82); Folkestone, Kent, England
- Batting: Unknown

Domestic team information
- Years: Team
- 1905/06: Europeans

Career statistics
Competition	First-class
Matches	1
Runs scored	23
Batting average	11.50
100s/50s	–/–
Top score	13
Catches/stumpings	–/–
- Source: ESPNcricinfo, 27 October 2023

Henry Beaumont OBE (7 October 1881 – 17 August 1964) was an English first-class cricketer and British Army officer.

The son of Henry Beaumont senior, he was born at Grantham in October 1881. He was educated at Wellington College, before attending the Royal Military College, Sandhurst. He graduated from there into the Lancashire Fusiliers as a second lieutenant in August 1900, with promotion to lieutenant following in May 1902. Whilst serving in British India with the Fusiliers, Beaumont made a single appearance in first-class cricket for the Europeans cricket team against the Parsees in the 1905–06 Bombay Quadrangular. Batting twice in the match, he was dismissed for 10 runs in the Europeans first innings by Jehangir Warden, while following-on in their second innings he was dismissed for 13 runs by K. B. Mistry.

Beaumont later served in the First World War, having been promoted to captain only weeks before the start of the conflict. During the war, he was promoted to major in September 1915 and was decorated by the Sultan of Egypt with the Order of the Nile, 4th Class in March 1916. He was appointed to the staff in August 1916, and was made an OBE. Following the war, he retired from active service in December 1919. Beaumont died at Folkestone in August 1964.
