= Alexander Kearsey =

English cricketer and British Army officer (1877–1967)

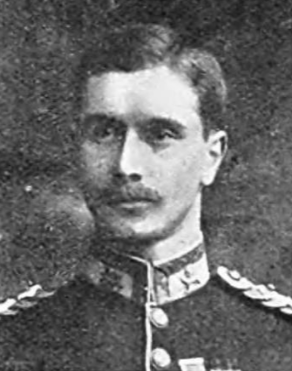
- Born: Alexander Horace Cyril Kearsey; 17 December 1877; Burstow, Surrey, England
- Died: 8 October 1967 (aged 89); Wandsworth, London, England
- Military career
- Allegiance: United Kingdom
- Branch: British Army; Royal Air Force
- Service years: 1896–1918
- Rank: Lieutenant colonel
- Units: York and Lancaster Regiment; Royal Hussars; Dorset Regiment; King's Own Scottish Borderers
- Conflicts: Second Boer War; Relief of Ladysmith; Battle of Venters Spruit; Battle of Spion Kop; Battle of Vaal Kranz; Battle of Tucela Heights; Battle of Pieters Hill; Battle of Laing's Nek; First World War; First Battle of Ypres; Battle of Neuve Chapelle; Gallipoli campaign; Sinai and Palestine campaign; First Battle of Gaza; Second Battle of Gaza; Battle of El Teb
- Awards: Distinguished Service Order; Order of the Karađorđe's Star; Order of the Nile
- Other work: Cricketer, military historian
- Cricket career

Cricket information
- Batting: Unknown
- Role: Wicket-keeper

Domestic team information
- Years: Team
- 1903/04–1905/06: Europeans (India)
- 1913: Buckinghamshire

Career statistics
Competition	First-class
Matches	2
Runs scored	6
Batting average	2.00
100s/50s	–/–
Top score	4
Catches/stumpings	1/1
- Source: ESPNcricinfo, 27 June 2011

Alexander Horace Cyril Kearsey, DSO, OBE (17 December 1877 – 8 October 1967) was a British Army officer who served in the Second Boer War and the First World War. He was also an English cricketer, but his military career limited his cricketing appearances.

== Early life ==
The son of Francis Kearsey, he was born at Burstow Hall, Surrey. He was educated at Rottingdean School and Clifton College, before attending the Royal Military College, Sandhurst.

== Military career ==
After graduating from Sandhurst, Kearsey was commissioned into the York and Lancaster Regiment as a second lieutenant on 7 May 1896. He was promoted to lieutenant on 20 June 1900. Kearsey fought in the Second Boer War, being present at the Relief of Ladysmith. During the operations in the Relief, Kearsay was severely wounded at Venters Spruit on 20 January 1900. The following month, having recovered from his injuries sufficiently enough, he took part in action at Spion Kop, Vaal Kranz and toward the end of February, action at Tucela Heights and Pieters Hill. Kearsey later took part in operations in Natal from March to June 1900, including at the Battle of Laing's Nek. He also took part in operations in Transvaal Colony from May to June 1901 and operations in Orange River Colony from December 1901 to 31 May 1902. Mentioned twice in dispatches during the course of the war by Sir Redvers Buller, he was also mentioned in the London Gazette in a list of soldiers and officers who had distinguished themselves in the conflict. Weeks later he was made a Companion of the Distinguished Service Order, with the insignia being presented by Edward VII on 14 March 1902. Following the end of the war in June 1902 he left Cape Town on board the SS Rippingham Grange, which arrived in Southampton in October 1902.

Kearsey was promoted to captain on 12 March 1904, while the following year he was transferred to the 10th Royal Hussars. He then served in the Territorial Force as an adjutant from March 1908 to April 1911.

With the outbreak of the First World War in the summer of 1914, Kearsey attended the Staff College, Camberley, and was promoted to major on 11 November 1914. At the start of the war, he was posted as part of the Embarkation Staff at Southampton, following which he proceeded to Belgium with the 1st Life Guards, 7th Cavalry Brigade. He took part in the First Battle of Ypres and saw action at Neuve-Chapelle. In 1915, he was attached to the staff of the 7th Cavalry Brigade, and August 1915 he was appointed brigade major with the 1/2nd South-Western Mounted Brigade, seeing action in Gallipoli. He later commanded the 5th Dorset Regiment for months, till May 1916. Following this, he was appointed GS01 with the 54th Division, Egyptian Expeditionary Force, seeing action at the first and Second Battle of Gaza, both of which ended in Ottoman victories. He later commanded 1/5th King's Own Scottish Borderers, seeing action at the Battle of El Teb, during the course of which he was wounded. At the time he was a temporary lieutenant colonel. For his services in the conflict, Kearsey was decorated by the Kingdom of Serbia with the Order of the Karađorđe's Star, 4th Class with Swords and the Order of the Nile. Transferring to the fledgling Royal Air Force, he commanded the Cadet Wing and was appointed staff officer, 1st grade on 28 December 1918. During his life, Kearsey published a number of his records including, The War Records of the York and Lancaster Regiment, South Africa, 1900–1902,1903, which detailed his time with the York and Lancaster Regiment in the Boer War. He also published records of the campaign in Egypt and Palestine during the First World War. He later wrote a number of books analysing military strategy.

== Cricket ==
As a cricketer, Kearsey's batting style is unknown, but is known he fielded as a wicket-keeper. While serving in the British Raj, he made his first-class debut for the Europeans against the Parsees in 1903. He ended the Europeans first-innings unbeaten on 0. In their second-innings, he was dismissed for 2 runs by Maneksha Bulsara. His second first-class appearance came for the Europeans in 1905, in a repeat of his debut match. In this match, he was dismissed for a duck by Jehangir Warden in the Europeans first-innings, while in their second-innings he was dismissed for 4 runs by the same bowler. Taking up position behind the stumps, he took a single catch and made a single stumping. He later made two Minor Counties Championship appearances in 1913 for Buckinghamshire, against Berkshire and Wiltshire. He did not appear for Buckinghamshire after this season.

== Later life ==
Kearsey died in Wandsworth, London, on 8 October 1967. He had married, in 1907, Hon. Frances Mitford (1875–1951), eldest daughter of Lord Redesdale. They had one daughter, Clementine (b. 1908).
