= Order of the Nile =

Egyptian medal

Order of the Nile Kiladat El Nil
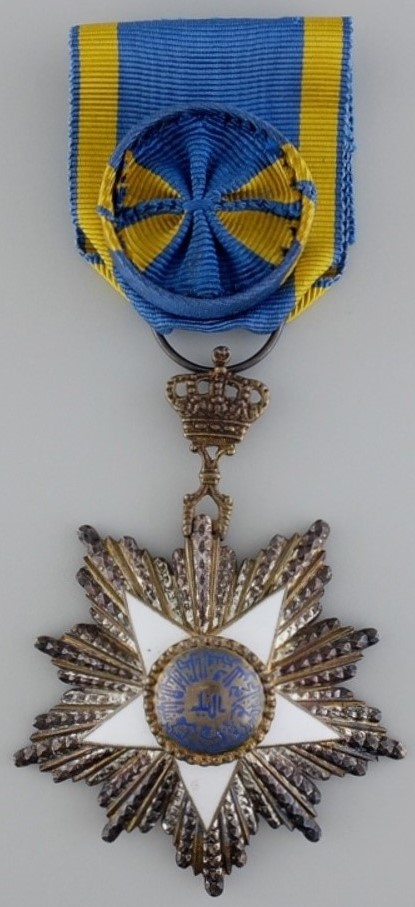
- Badge of the 4th class of the Order, Officer.
- Type: Order
- Awarded for: Rendering useful service to Egypt
- Country: Egypt
- Presented by: Kingdom of Egypt
- Established: 1915
- First award: General Sir Reginald Wingate, 1915
- Ribbon bar for Grand Cordon Ribbon bar for Grand Officer Ribbon bar for Commander Ribbon bar for Officer Ribbon bar for Knight
- Related: Order of Ismail

Order of the Nile Kiladat El Nil
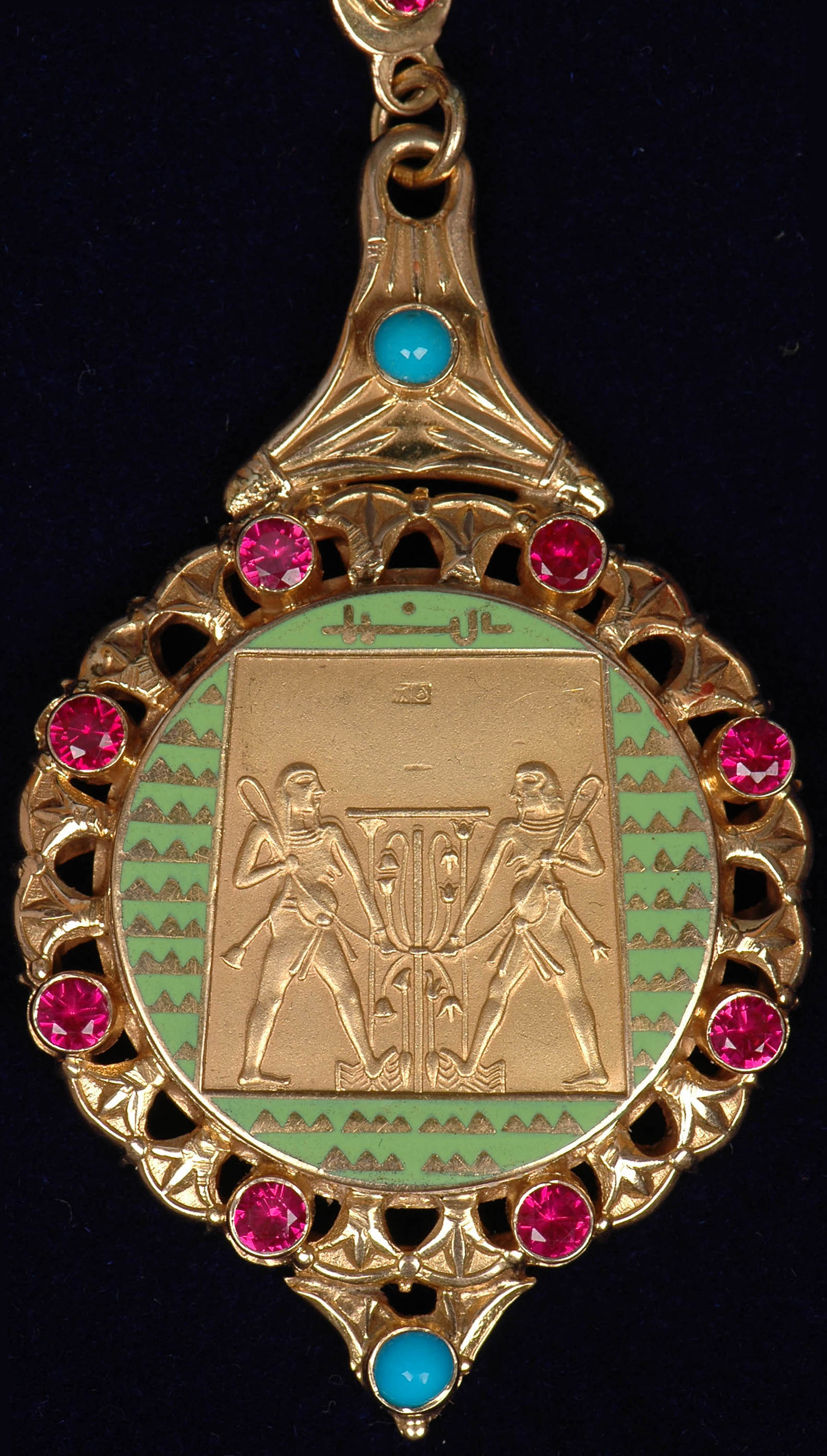
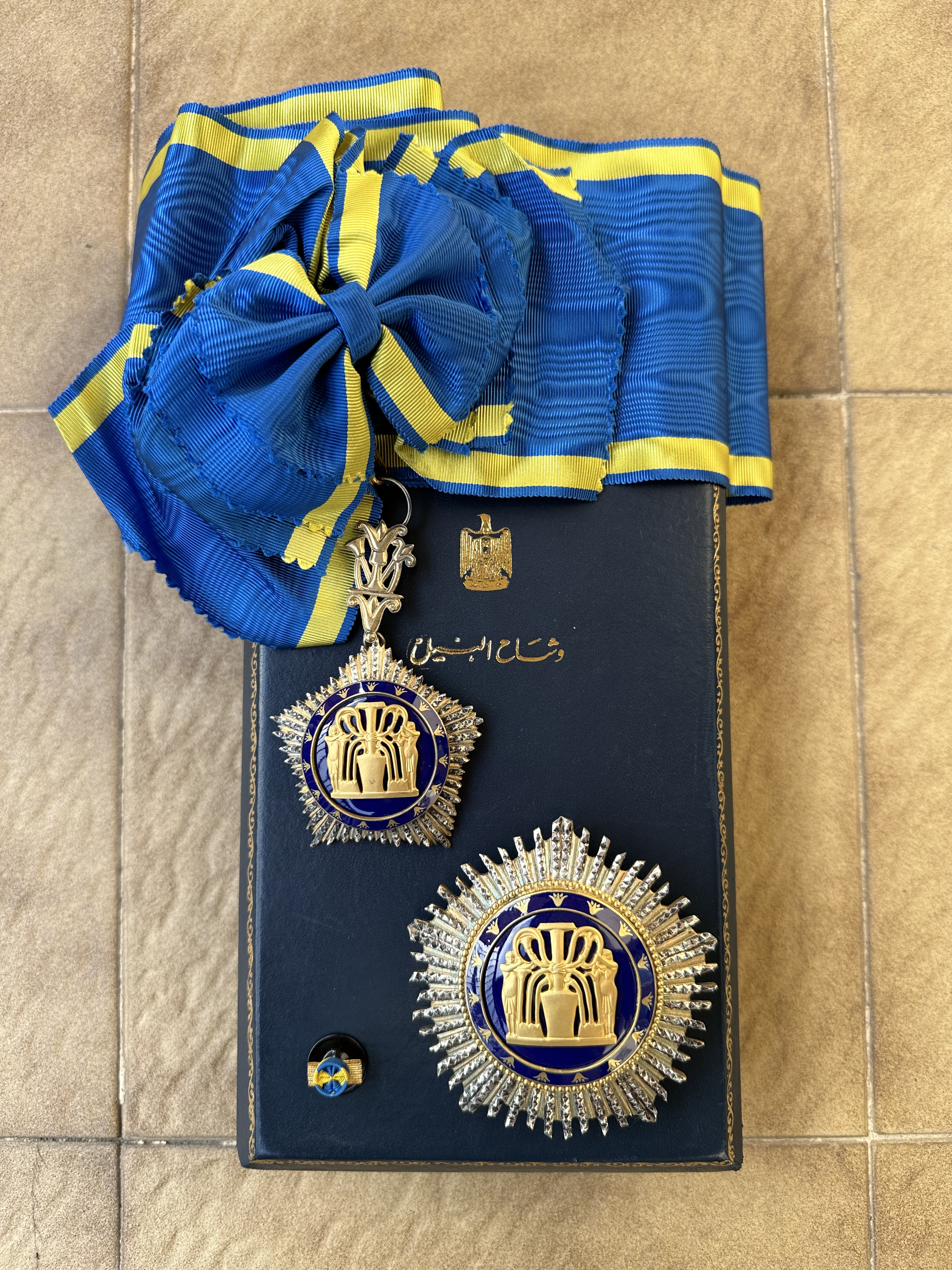
- Badge of the Collar of the Nile and Grand Cordon of the Order
- Type: Order
- Awarded for: Exceptional valuable public service to the Republic of Egypt.
- Presented by: Republic of Egypt
- Established: 18 June 1953, as a reconstituted Order by the new Republic
- Ribbon bar for Grand Cordon

Precedence
- Next (lower): Order of the Republic

The Order of the Nile (Kiladat El Nil) was established in 1915 and was one of the Kingdom of Egypt's principal orders until the monarchy was abolished in 1953. It was then reconstituted as the Republic of Egypt's highest state honor.

== Sultanate and Kingdom of Egypt ==
The Order was established in 1915 by Sultan Hussein Kamel of Egypt for award to persons who had rendered useful service to the country. It ranked beneath the Order of Ismail and was frequently awarded to British officers and officials serving in Egypt, as well as distinguished Egyptian citizens.
The order comprised five classes:

1. Grand Cordon: Badge worn from a sash over the right shoulder, with a star on the left chest.
2. Grand Officer: Badge worn around the neck, with a smaller star on the left chest.
3. Commander: Badge worn around the neck.
4. Officer: Badge worn on the left chest from a ribbon bearing a rosette.
5. Knight: Badge worn on the left chest from a plain ribbon.

== Republic of Egypt ==
After Egypt became a republic in 1953 the Order of the Nile was reconstituted to serve as Egypt's highest state honor. It now consists of:

1. Collar: worn by the president of the Republic and may be granted to other Heads of State.
2. Grand Cordon: awarded for exceptional services to the nation. Regarding this class, the badge of the order is worn from a sash and the star of the order worn on the left chest.

Although the five class structure of the original 1915 order was mentioned when the order was restructured in 1953, the four more junior grades (i.e. Grand Officer, Commander, Officer and Knight) are no longer awarded.

== Some appointees to the order ==
=== Sultanate and Kingdom of Egypt (1915–1953) ===
- Brigadier Peter Acland (4th class), 1936
- Sir Pratap Singh of Idar (Grand Cordon), 1918
- Judge Sir Maurice Amos (Grand Cordon)
- Maharaja Jagatjit Singh Bahadur of Kapurthala (Grand Cordon), 1924
- Major Henry Beaumont (4th Class), 1916
- Rear Admiral Richard Bevan (4th Class), 1919
- Field Marshall Lord Birdwood
- Lieutenant General Louis Bols
- Lieutenant Colonel Arthur Borton VC, DSO (3rd Class)
- Howard Carter, British archaeologist and Egyptologist (3rd Class), 1926
- Jovan Dučić
- Major Aubrey Faulkner
- Major General Harold Franklyn, Commandant Sudan Defence Force, 1939
- Major Harry Gardner (4th Class), 1922
- Lieutenant Colonel Alexander Kearsey (3rd Class)
- Harold Knox-Shaw, British astronomer
- Lancelot Lowther, 6th Earl of Lonsdale, 1920
- Naguib Pasha Mahfouz, obstetrician and gynecologist, 1919
- Lieutenant Colonel Cecil L'Estrange Malone
- David McAllister, Engineer-in-Chief, Egyptian State Railways, (3rd Class), 1916
- Earl Mountbatten of Burma, (fourth class), 1922
- Charles Paget, 6th Marquess of Anglesey, 1915
- General Sir William Peyton (2nd Class), 1916
- General Hussein Refki Pasha (Grand Cordon)
- Admiral of the Fleet The Earl of Cork and Orerry, 3rd class (1916)
- Admiral Francis Mitchell (Royal Navy officer)
- Rear Admiral Eric Gascoigne Robinson
- Captain George Francis Scott Elliot
- Dr. Hassan Omar Shaheen – Professor of ENT Kasr El-Aini Hospital, Cairo. Circa 1920
- Major-General Sir Charlton Watson Spinks, last Sirdar of Egypt (Grand Cordon), 1931
- Dr. Oskar Stross, Austrian Consul General
- Mervyn Whitfield, Political Branch, Public Security, Alexandria, 1917
- General Sir Reginald Wingate, 1915
- Judge Youssef Zulficar Pasha (Grand Cordon)
- Oswald Longstaff Prowde, English civil engineer
- Lt Colonel William John Ainsworth, CBE DSO Durham Light Infantry (3rd Class 1919),

=== Republic of Egypt (from 1953) ===
- King Hussein of Jordan, 1955
- Marshal Josip Broz Tito, President of the Federal People's Republic of Yugoslavia, 1956
- Prof. Amintore Fanfani, Prime Minister and ad-interim Minister of Foreign Affairs of the Republic of Italy, 1959
- Yuri Gagarin, Soviet cosmonaut, 1961
- Taha Hussein, Egyptian writer, 1965
- Umm kulthum, Egyptian singer and actress, 1965
- Mohammed Abdel Wahab, Egyptian singer and composer, 1965
- President Jimmy Carter, President of the United States, 1979
- Emperor Akihito of Japan
- Emperor Amha Selassie of Ethiopia
- Mohammed Burhanuddin, 52nd Da'i al-Mutlaq of the Dawoodi Bohra, 1978
- King Bhumibol Adulyadej of Thailand
- Mohamed ElBaradei, former director general of the International Atomic Energy Agency (IAEA)
- Queen Elizabeth II, 1975
- Birendra Bir Bikram shah Dev, King of Nepal, 1974
- Mohammad Reza Pahlavi, Shah of Iran, 1975
- Hassaballah El Kafrawy, Egyptian former Minister of Housing
- Pengiran Anak Haji Mohamed Yusof, prince consort and cheteria of Brunei, 1984
- Naguib Mahfouz, Egyptian writer, 1988
- King Fahd bin Abdulaziz Al Saud of Saudi Arabia, 1989
- Pierre Gemayel, founder of the Lebanese Phalange
- Emperor Haile Selassie of Ethiopia
- King Hamad bin Isa Al Khalifa of Bahrain, 2016
- King Idris of Libya (Grand Cordon)
- Ekmeleddin İhsanoğlu, Turkish academic, diplomat and former Secretary-General of the Organisation of Islamic Cooperation (OIC)
- Émile Lahoud, President of Lebanon, 2000
- Makarios III, former president of Cyprus
- Nelson Mandela, President of South Africa
- Adly Mansour, former Chief Justice of the Supreme Constitutional Court and former acting President of Egypt
- King Mohammed VI of Morocco
- Muhammad Naguib, First President of Egypt
- Nursultan Nazarbayev, President of Kazakhstan
- Antonín Novotný, President of Czechoslovakia
- Sultan Qaboos bin Said al Said of Oman, 1976
- Ziaur Rahman, President of Bangladesh
- Heinrich Rau, East German politician (Grand Cordon), 1961
- King Saud bin Abdulaziz Al Saud of Saudi Arabia, 1954
- King Norodom Sihanouk of Cambodia
- William E. Simon, U.S. Secretary of the Treasury
- Suharto, President of Indonesia
- Field Marshal Mohamed Hussein Tantawi, former chairman of the Supreme Council of the Armed Forces of Egypt, 2012
- Walter Ulbricht, President of East Germany, 1965
- George Vasiliou, former president of Cyprus
- Sir Magdi Habib Yacoub, Egyptian professor of Cardiothoracic Surgery
- Professor Ahmed Zewail, Egyptian scientist
- Katerina Sakellaropoulou, President of Greece, 2020
- Salva Kiir, President of South Sudan, 2020
- Haitham bin Tariq, Sultan of Oman, 2023
- Narendra Modi, Prime Minister of India, 2023
- Mufaddal Saifuddin, 53rd Da'i al-Mutlaq of the Dawoodi Bohras, 2023
- Mishal Al-Ahmad Al-Jaber Al-Sabah, Emir of Kuwait, 2024
- King Frederik X, King of Denmark, 2024
- King Felipe VI, King of Spain, 2025
- Donald Trump, President of the United States, 2025

== See also ==
- Orders, decorations, and medals of Egypt
