= St Peter's Church, Firle =

Historic Anglican church in Firle, East Sussex

Church of St Peter, Firle
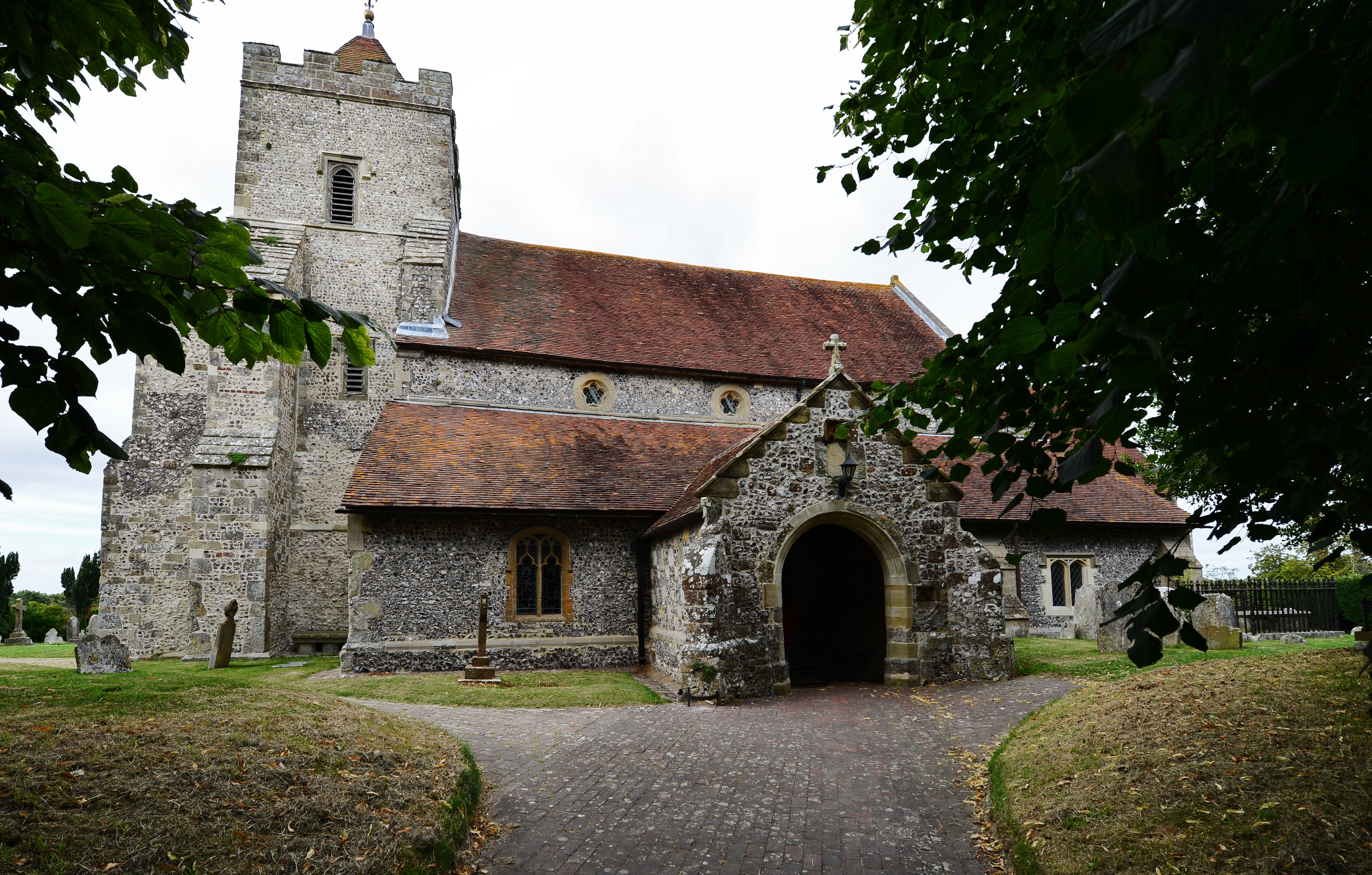
- Church of St Peter, Firle
- 50.844994°N 0.088477°E
- Location: Firle, East Sussex
- Country: England
- Denomination: Church of England

History
- Status: Parish church
- Dedication: Saint Peter

Architecture
- Functional status: Active
- Heritage designation: Grade I listed
- Designated: 18 June 1965
- Style: Perpendicular Gothic with earlier elements

Administration
- Diocese: Chichester
- Archdeaconry: Lewes and Hastings
- Deanery: Lewes and Seaford
- Parish: Firle

Listed Building – Grade I
- Official name: The Parish Church of St Peter
- Designated: 20 August 1965
- Reference no.: 1043939

St Peter's Church, Firle is a Grade I listed Church of England parish church in Firle, East Sussex, England, dedicated to Peter the Apostle. It stands adjacent to Firle Place, seat of the Gage family since the 15th century, who have long patronised the church.

Part of the benefice of Glynde, Firle and Beddingham, Reverend Peter Owen-Jones has been the rector of St Peter's since 2005.

== History and architecture ==
A Saxon church in Firle is attested to before 1066, belonging to the Abbey of Wilton. Rebuilt sometime in the decades following the Norman Conquest of England, the living first passed to the Abbey of Grestain at le Bec Hellouin in Normandy. Between 1197 and 1204, Abbot Robert of Grestain gave Firle Church to the Dean and Chapter of Chichester Cathedral. A reset round-headed doorway in the north aisle dates from around this period.

By the 13th century, the nave had reached its present length, and the chancel and west tower were constructed. In the 14th century, north and south aisles were added, featuring arcades on octagonal piers and a broad chancel arch. Clerestory windows and a cinquefoil in the east gable also date from this period.

During the 15th century, square-headed aisle windows and a south aisle extension were introduced, along with a rood stair. In the 16th century, a chequered flint and stone south porch was added, with a moulded entrance arch, and buttresses were added to the tower. Around 1595, the north chapel - known as the Gage Chapel after its patrons - was built with a crown-post roof.

Restoration in 1867 included a tiled reredos on the chancel east wall sometimes attributed to William Morris.

== Interior fittings ==
Notable interior features include:

- Piscinae from the 13th and 15th centuries that survive in the chancel and south aisle, along with a 15th-century porch stoup damaged during the English Civil War.
- A square font combining a 15th-century arcaded stem with a later 19th-century bowl.
- 15th and 16th century brasses commemorating Bartholomew Bolney, Thomas and George Gage, and Mary Howard, which now hang on the east wall of the north aisle.
- Chest tomb of Sir John Gage KG - Lord Chamberlain during the reign of Queen Mary I from 1553 until his death in 1556 - and his wife Philippa in the Gage Chapel, topped with alabaster effigies of both lying on partly rolled mats serving as cushions.
- Two further chest-tomb with brass effigies and inscription plates also in the Gage Chapel, attributed by Nikolaus Pevsner to Gerard Johnson, both commissioned about 1595 by John Gage. One commemorates Sir Edward Gage (d.1569) and his wife, while the other, remembers John Gage himself and his two wives.

== Stained glass ==
- South aisle window depicting Martha and Mary, by John William Brown for Powell & Sons, 1885.
- East chancel window depicting the Crucifixion, by Henry Holiday for Powell & Sons, 1887.
- North aisle window showing St Michael and angels, by Kempe & Co, 1915.
- South aisle window showing St Michael and St Gabriel, by George Maile & Son, 1939.
- East window in Gage Chapel, depicting the Tree of Life in heavenly Jerusalem, designed by John Piper and made by David Wasley in 1982, installed in 1985.

== Notable burials ==
Buried in the churchyard of St Peter's are artists Vanessa Bell (d.1961) and Duncan Grant (d.1978), central members of the Bloomsbury Group who lived at Charleston Farmhouse, not far from Firle, from 1916 until their deaths.

== Gallery ==
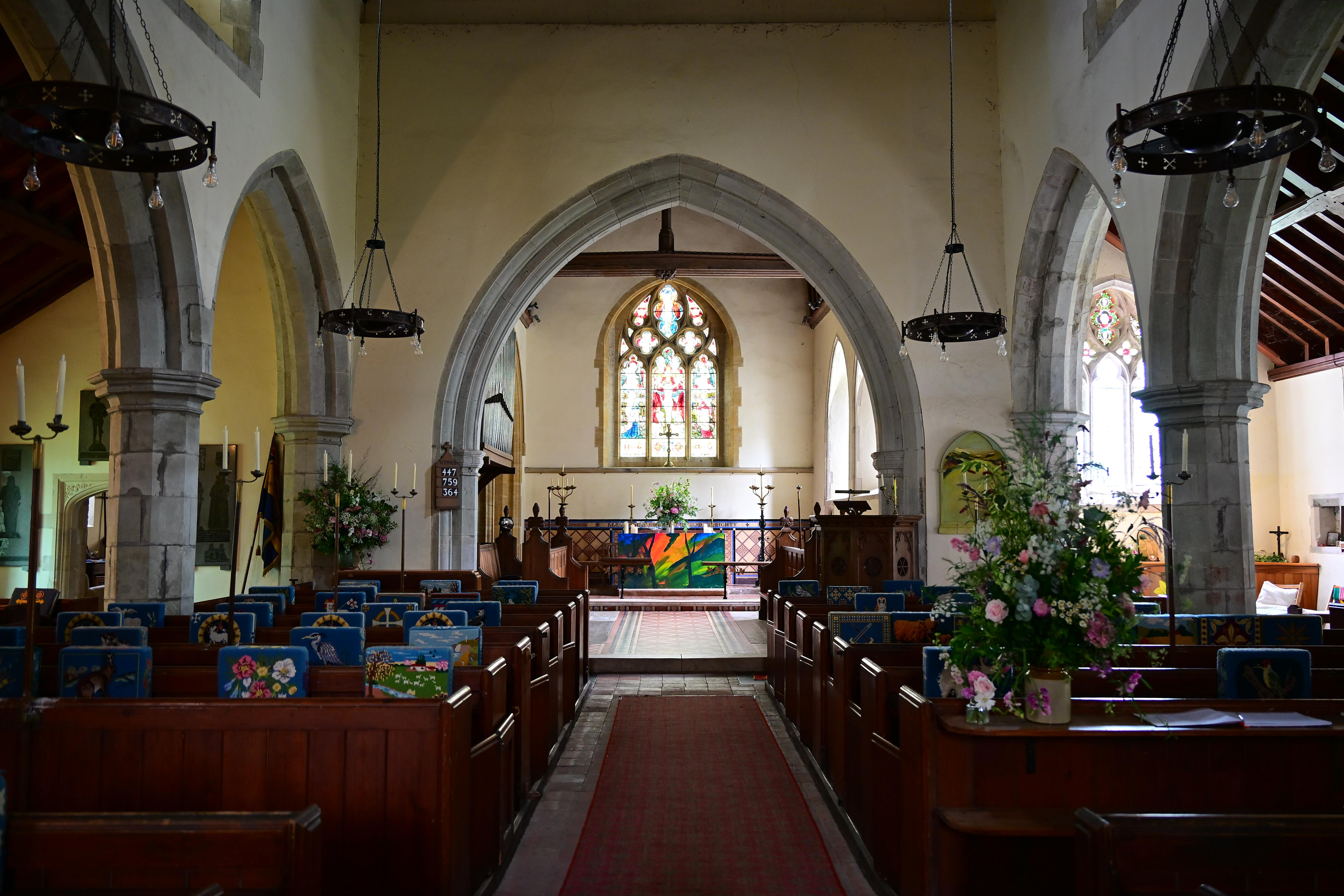
View of nave and chancel

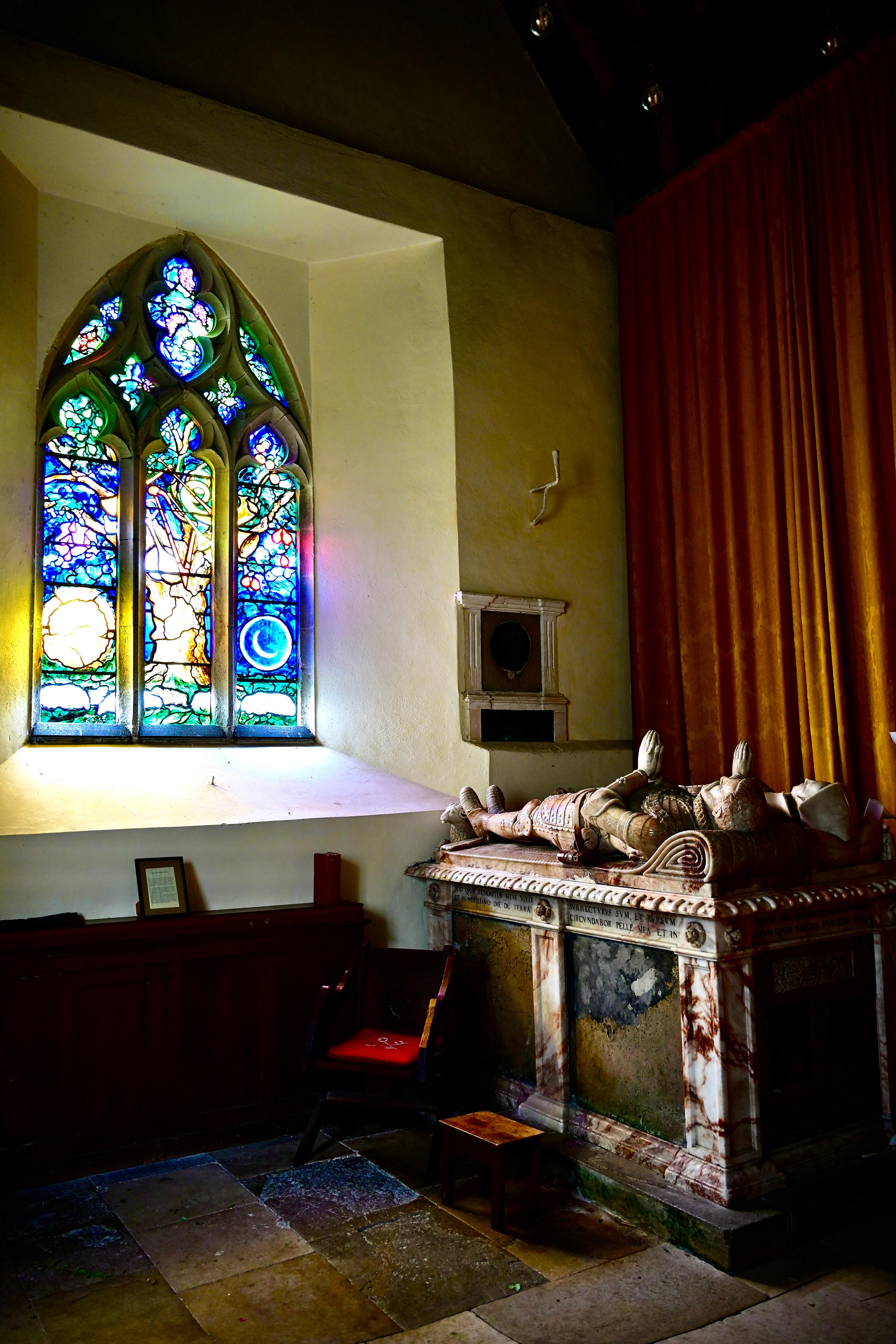
The Gage Chapel

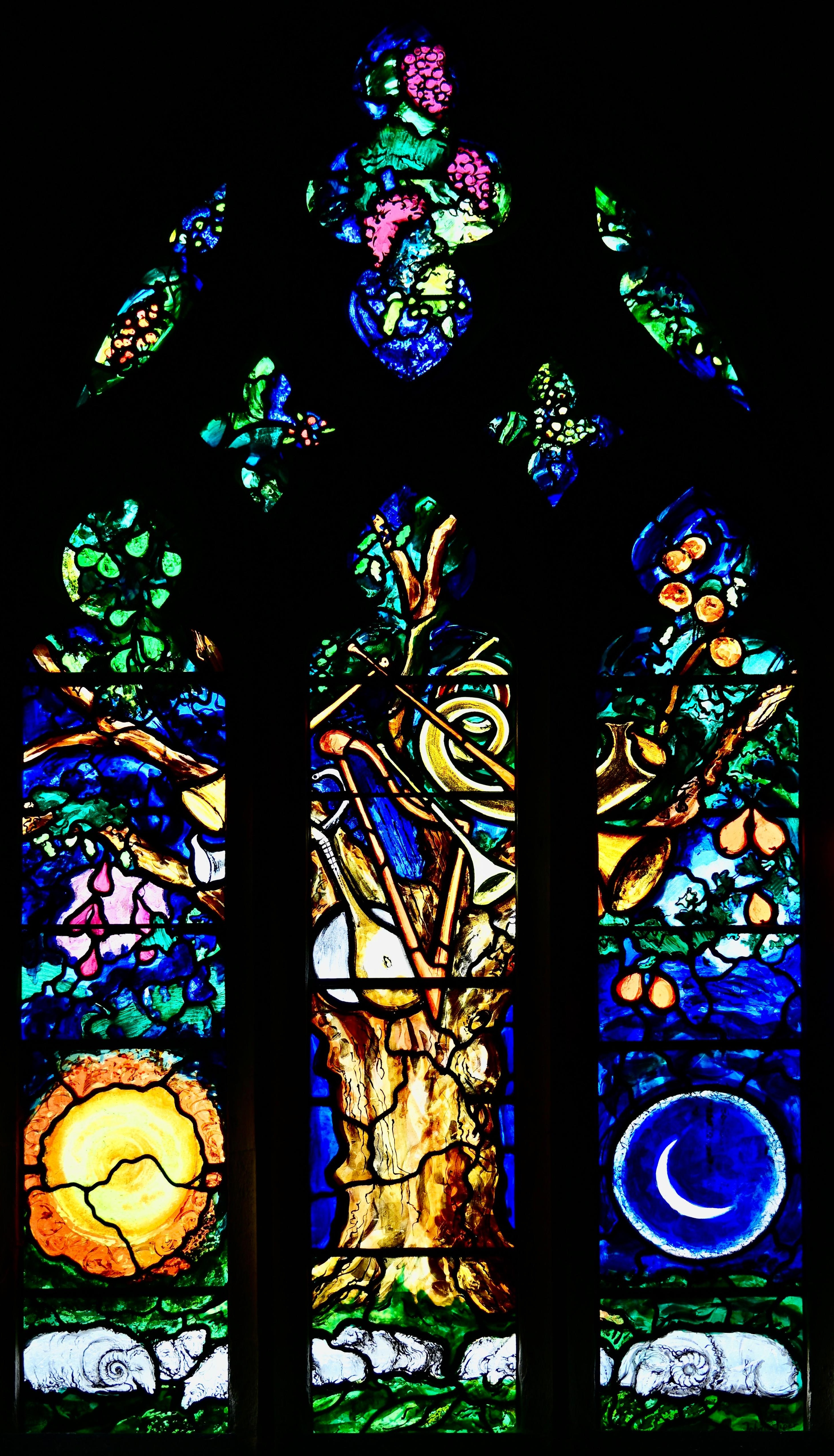
Window by John Piper

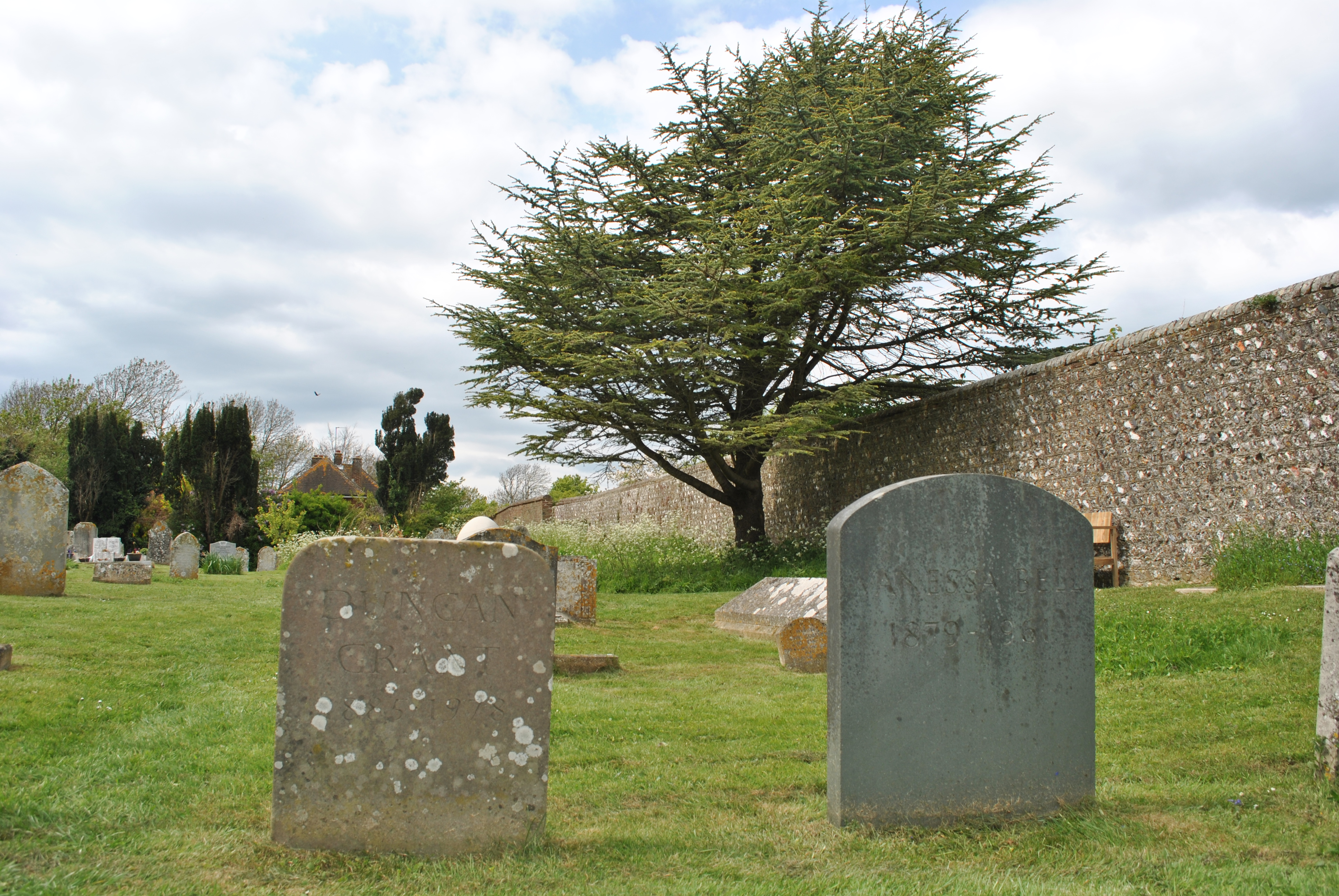
Graves of Vanessa Bell and Duncan Grant
