= Burstow =

Village and parish in Surrey, England

Coordinates: 51.168°N 0.110°W

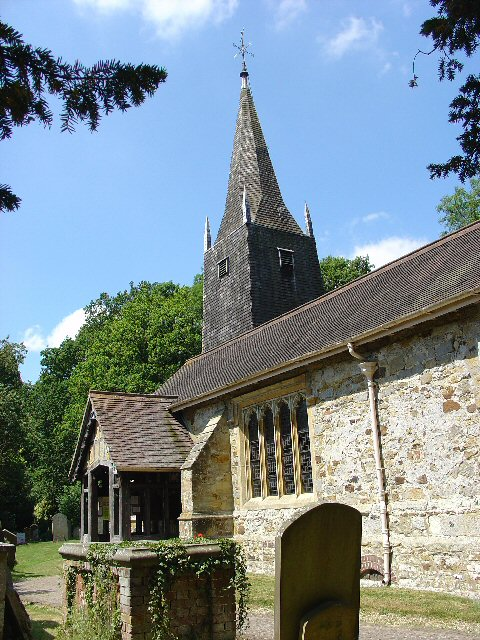
- St Bartholomew's Church

- Location within Surrey
- Area: 11.39 km^{2} (4.40 sq mi)
- Population: 4,333 (Civil Parish 2011)
  - Density: 380/km^{2} (980/sq mi)
- OS grid reference: TQ3243
- Civil parish: Burstow
- District: Tandridge
- Shire county: Surrey
- Region: South East
- Country: England
- Sovereign state: United Kingdom
- Post town: Horley
- Postcode district: RH6
- Dialling code: 01342
- Police: Surrey
- Fire: Surrey
- Ambulance: South East Coast
- UK Parliament: East Surrey

Burstow is a village and civil parish in the Tandridge district of Surrey, England. Its largest settlement is Smallfield. Smallfield is 2.5 miles (4.0 km) ENE of Gatwick Airport and the M23 motorway, 7.5 miles (12.1 km) southwest of Oxted and 1.8 miles (2.9 km) east of Horley. Crawley is a nearby large commercial town, 3.7 miles (6.0 km) southwest of Burstow and 5 miles (8.0 km) southwest of Smallfield. Towards the outside of the London commuter belt, some residents commute to the capital by road or rail from here as London is 24.5 miles (39.4 km) to the north or Horley railway station is accessible.

== History ==
=== Etymology ===
Burstowe and Burghstowe appear in the (14th century); Byrstowe appears in the 15th century and Bristowe is seen as an alternative to Burstow in the 17th century.

=== Roman and pre-Roman settlements ===
No artefacts are held in or referred to in the Surrey Archaeological Society predating the Anglo Saxon era in this parish.

=== Dark and Middle Ages ===
The first mention of Burstow is in a church record of 1121 the north and part of the west walls of the nave, with the west half of the north wall of the chancel, are for the most part of approximately 1210 in architecture; however its listing gives its date as 12th century references including Nicholas Pevsner's Buildings of England.

=== Manors ===
==== Burstow Manor ====
Records exist referring to this manor in the 13th century which is today the Grade II* listed building with tightly surrounding wide moat, Burstow Lodge formerly taking up the north of all the parish land.

Stephen de Burstow, whose name appears in the seals as Stephen Fitz Hamo, held the manor in the latter part of the 12th century, and that he was succeeded by his son Roger and his grandson John, the latter holding until and during the reign of Henry III, his descendant John de Burstow while Lord here served with the Black Prince during the wars with the French. A Charter of in 1247 gave the manor free warren, weekly markets and an annual three-day Michaelmas fair. In 1366 the reversion of the manor was given by Richard de Burstow to Sir Nicholas de Loveyne before passing to his son-in-law, Sir Philip St Clere. When St. Clere died in 1408, very shortly after his wife, he was holding the manor of Burstow 'of the Archbishop of Canterbury by paying £6 yearly at his manor of Wimbledon. His second son placed the manor in trust to three trustees for his heir's benefit 'in order to defraud the King' of the fee which was payable annually on the manor. His son-in-law Sir John Gage died in possession of the manor in 1475, which passed in turn to his son William and then to William's son, who was another Sir John Gage. Sir Edward Gage was his son and next Lord of the Manor, who as Sheriff of Surrey and Sussex (1557–8) was instrumental in the persecution of Protestants by Mary I who died in his last year as sheriff; he died in 1568. His grandson sold the manor to Sir Edward Culpepper of Wakehurst holding it from 1614 to 1640 when his son Sir William Culpeper, 1st Baronet of Wakehurst (died 1651) inherited it and became a Baronet. A family asset until the fourth Baronet sold Burstow Manor in 1696 to Sir William Raines LLD (Note: Sir William Raines was a Judge of the Prerogative Court of Canterbury), whose son sold it in 1733 to Joseph Kirke whose death led to it belonging to James Harris, after which his son Christopher ran the manor followed by his son James until 1808. Then Thomas followed by his son John Hugh Bainbridge; by 1870 it was acquired by Henry Kelsey of Burstow Park, uniting what remained of the two estates. On death in 1888 Alfred Howard Lloyd held the manor until at least 1911 and also bought Burstow Lodge.

==== Burstow Park ====
Burstow Park was a detached possession of the manor of Wimbledon. Hubert who was Archbishop of Canterbury until 1205 was mentioned as seized of this manor in a Charter relating to land to the south of Burstow Park. A commission was issued in 1328 against evildoers who had entered the parks of his manors at Croydon, Wimbledon, Wyke and Burstow. In 1531 Burstow Park was leased to Sir John Gage (see above) for 80 years, reserving (excepting) the deer to the archbishop until the following Christmas. Thomas Cranmer exchanged the Wimbledon manor with Henry VIII in 1535. In 1590 Elizabeth granted to Sir Thomas Cecil and his heirs the manor of Wimbledon and "all those our lands in Bristowe alias Burstowe called le Parke", after whom indebted Treasurer-at-War Sir Thomas Shirley held; however his trustees released the land to Elizabeth in satisfaction of £800 11s. 8d. remaining due to her, which she then obtained from the next buyers: William Bowes and others. Passing by Quarles, Turner and Infield, Falconer and Payne in whose possession a park is mentioned as still existing in 1649. John Payne was holding it and owing to a dispute it was bought by his cousin John Smith and during this 18th century period it passed then to Walter Harris, Daniel Hailes and Thomas Dickson, in the 19th century it passed to Henry Kelsey, who died in 1827, and whose son, of Burstow Court Manor owned the estate in 1841 and held it as a farm until death in 1887 when Alfred Lloyd bought it (see above). Burstow Park is considered the manor house of Burstow Court Manor, as well as of Burstow Park, but is probably not the most ancient manor-house of the former.

==== Burstow Lodge ====
Burstow Lodge was another manor; made up of "a messuage (house), 360 acres of land, 12 acres of meadow, 10 acres of wood, and 20s" in 1329 when it was given to Roger son of Ralph Salaman, was held of the Burstow family for 26s. and in suit of manorial court. Later owners surnames in order were Codyington (Note: e.g. John Codyngton held a court in Burstow Lodge in 1491-2); Codyngton with an alternative surname of St Myghell; Fromond (recusant Catholics); Richard Walmesley; Lord Petre; Melancthon Saunders relation to the then Lord of the Manor of Charlwood however by 1911 it was no longer a manor.

==== Redehall formerly spelt Redhall ====
John de Wysham's manor of Redehall consisted in 1332 of 1 messuage, 160 acres (65 ha) of land, 6 acres (2.4 ha) acres of meadow, and 22s. rent in Burstow known as the manor of Redhall near Burstow, which he held, jointly with Hawisia his wife, of (Note: The manor was held of fealty) John de Burstow, his son John was knighted and gave it to John Pecche, alderman of London. Redehall manor passed out of the hands of the Pecches and became the property of the Welles family. In 1650 it was Edward Payne the elder's and Hannah his wife's and it continued to be held by this family until the late 18th century. Thomas Holles Payne, by his will, proved in May 1800, devised the "manor of Redhall, including a capital messuage or mansion-house called Redhall, and a messuage called Cophall" to Sophia Elizabeth Beard. Although in 1911 the house was surrounded "by a broad moat inclosing a considerable area of ground" a development of smaller houses has replaced it in Burstow.

=== Post Reformation ===
John Flamsteed, astronomer and cleric was rector of Burstow from 1684 until his death in 1719, was appointed in 1675 by Charles II to be the first Astronomer Royal. His accurate measurements of star positions and the movements of the moon, made in the newly opened Royal Observatory, Greenwich, contributed to making possible the safe navigation of shipping around the world. Flamsteed is buried in Burstow Church and a star that commemorates him is in the large window above the altar. Before the charity commission amalgamated most charities in 1908 there were local charities for the poor. In 1718 John Flamsteed left money to buy new coats for two poor Christian people – in 1728 his widow Margaret Flamsteed left money for clothing for two poor women. In 1975 a Flamsteed festival took place in the village.

Smallfield had its own smithy where horses were shod and other work was carried out. This stood in Weatherhill Road opposite where the present bus shelter stands, and in its place are Georgian architecture, classical-style houses.

=== Post Industrial Revolution ===
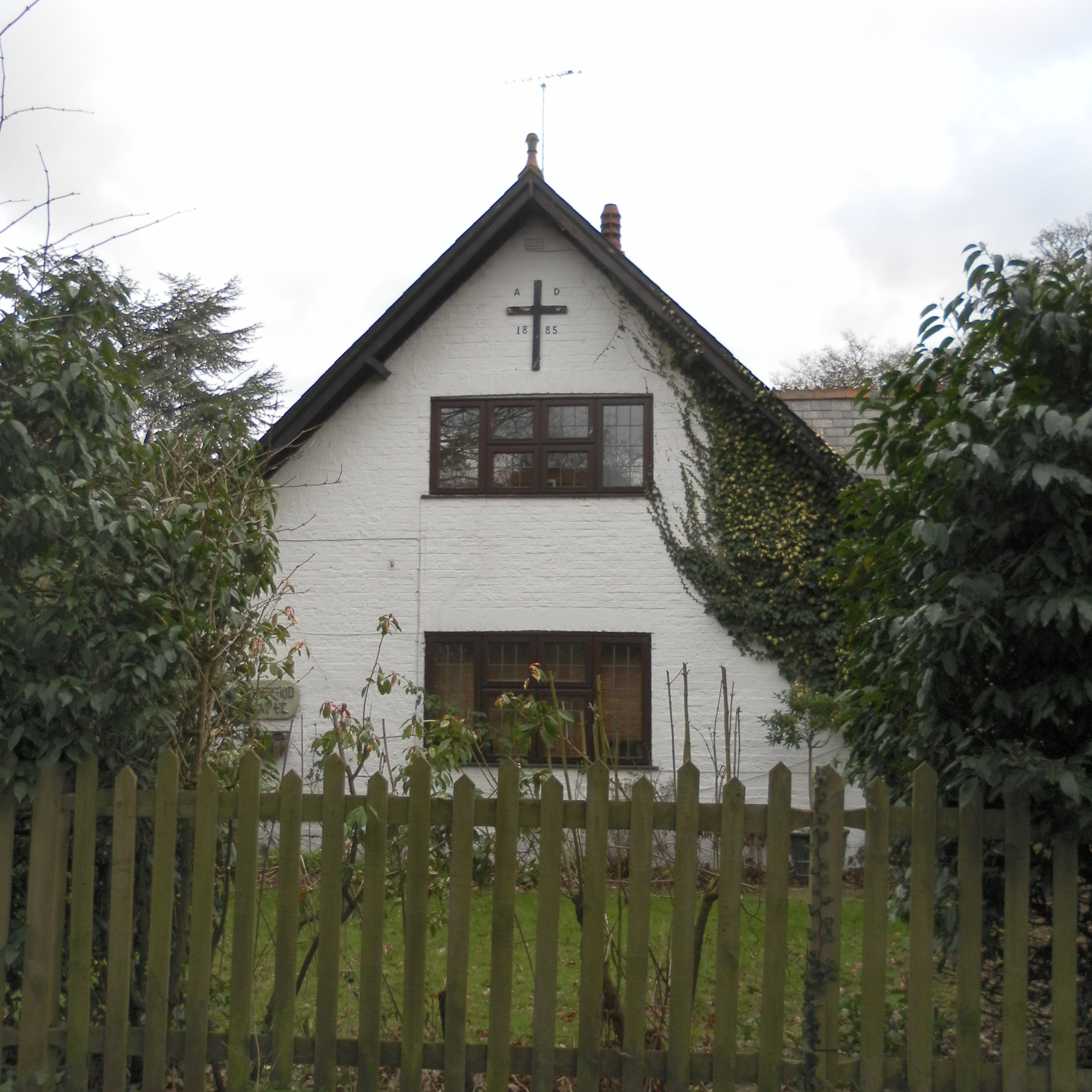
The former Baptist chapel at Fernhill, part of the parish which is now in West Sussex.

Although there was a marked period of growing population and industrialization in Britain, in 1911 the entire parish was described by a topographer as "purely agricultural, with a few brickfields" – which was due to accessible underlying clay in parts of the parish. The village was as then not at all compact; there were a few houses near the church, others spread to north or south or were a few scattered farms. In 1911 Copthorne (Sussex) was briefly, as not historically before then, included in the parish.

The decorated Second Boer War and World War I officer Alexander Kearsey was born at Burstow Hall just west of the border in the west of Shipley Bridge neighbourhood in Crawley district.

Smallfield Hospital was built early in World War II on land beside Broadbridge Lane for use by the Canadian Army to treat their wartime casualties and briefly served as a state-run hospital. In 1962 it was used in filming a scene of The Password is Courage which starred Dirk Bogarde. In its place is the 'Canadian' housing estate: Toronto Drive, Ontario Drive and Alberta Drive are named for the many Canadians who used the hospital during the war.

By 1911 there were Baptist chapels at Burstow and at Fernhill, and a mission room near Smallfield. The hamlet of Fernhill was moved into West Sussex and the Borough of Crawley in 1990.

== Geography ==
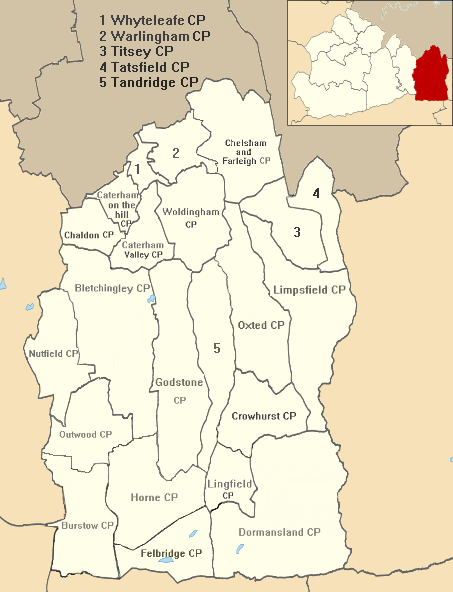
Map showing the boundaries of Burstow civil parish within the Tandridge District, Surrey. It occupies the south-westernmost part of the district.

Burstow village centre which consists of the south of Redehall Road, east of Broadbridge Lane and of Church Street (at the centre of the ecclesiastical parish which covers the south of the civil parish) are 1 mile (1.6 km) south of Smallfield village, which is its largest settlement.

Burstow stream and Copthorne stream rise near the parish in West Sussex and join in fields by Wellfield Copse just before entering the parish, passing by Shipley Bridge lane, where a its bridge running east–west towards Shipley Bridge neighbourhood which straddles the border with Horley then passing between Mushroom Farm, Church Lane and the two abandoned moated sites by the Church and large Rectory, which is now two buildings.

Smallfield commences directly east of the M23 which bypasses Redhill and Crawley. Above much of the green buffers of the parish is the take-off/landing flight path to Gatwick Airport, 2.5 miles (4.0 km) to the west. The nearest larger settlement is Horley, some 2 miles or 3 km to the west.

=== Elevation, geology and soil ===
Elevations vary from 101m in the south east corner of the relatively rectangular area to 59m AOD where the Burstow stream leaves in the north west corner of the parish.

Across the northern part of the parish a ridge of higher land runs from east to west, formed by a bed of Paludina limestone. It yields stone, usually called Sussex marble, which is susceptible of being polished; but, as is generally the case in the Surrey examples of this stone, it is too friable for architectural work. The soil part of a wide 15 miles (24 km) to 20 miles (32 km) band south of the Greensand Ridge of "slowly permeable loamy/clayey slightly acid but base-rich soil"

== Localities ==
=== Smallfield ===
Smallfield derives its name from a narrow piece of land (Saxon smæl feld) donated by Lord Burghersh to John de Burstow in thanks for war assistance rendered – see Smallfield Place.

Burstow Primary School, or simply Burstow School, the largest state school in the parish, is in the middle of the neighbourhood.

Aurora Redehall School has occupied the original state school building, which was built before Queen Victoria's Golden Jubilee, since the 1970s. This building was also known as The Gables.

=== Keeper's Corner ===
Keeper's Corner is the southerly part of the village. On the south side of its 'corner' crossroads is and opposite it are allotment gardens for the center of the settlement. Built around 1700 with early 20th extensions, the small house has lucarne windows and is part timber-frame on a plinth, late use timber frame design was often seen as this is part of the timber-frame prevalent region named the Weald.

=== Shipley Bridge ===
Shipley Bridge forms the western border settlement of the village – there is a public house here along Antlands Lane East which is its narrow main street between both sides of the small community, straddling the M23 motorway which has a neat parabolic arch bypass for the main through road that west of here divides in a T-junction towards Horley/motorway access to the north and Pound Hill, Crawley to the south. A second residential road is on the Burstow side of the Horley parish border, Green Lane, which leads up to Mushroom farm and the confluence already mentioned.

Sanger's Circus had winter quarters for its animals at Burstow Lodge (at the northern end of Chapel Road) from the early 1900s until around 1940. It has been recorded that the elephants were used for ploughing land in the area.

== Landmarks ==
The antiquarian feature of the parish is the comparatively large number of moated houses. ^{H. E. Malden 1911}

=== Church of St Bartholomew ===
The only Anglican church referred to above dates from the 12th century. An east window with an imposing star in the chancel commemorates John Flamsteed, who is buried there with his wife. A noteworthy piece of timber construction, probably of 16th-century date, forms the tower; the supporting beams and posts being "very massive" according to the topographer and historian Malden. The benefice is a rectory. Tithes were commuted for £600 and in 1848 the glebe was 43 acres, however, none is referred to in 1911. (Note: As there is still a rectory it remains the rector's legal duty to repair the chancel – see chancel repair liability)

The church was restored in 1884, a new roof and the south porch being added by Benjamin Edmund Ferrey. All six bells in the tower were recast between 1899 and 1906, when they were inscribed with their dates and with what medieval inscriptions of the makers they replaced.

=== Smallfield Place ===
One of five moated buildings in the parish including the court to the west, this is the tallest extending for more than half to three storeys. Altered in an ornate style the ashlar structure has embattled angle bay windows rising through just two storeys to left end. Smallfield Place has at its core a Jacobean manor built c. 1600 by Edward Bysshe's father on a land, the earlier promised a gift of some small field or piece of land in return for services rendered by John de Burstow during the reign of Edward III in the Hundred Years War to a fellow army knight Lord Burghersh.

Smallfield Place was where Edward Bysshe was born in 1615; he was knighted in 1661, in which year he made additions to the house, which bore that date. Owen Manning states that part of the house was pulled down, the remainder being occupied in his time as a farm, and owned by Isaac Martin Rebow who died in 1781. His daughter Mary Hester married General Francis Slater, who took the name of Rebow and owned Smallfield Place in 1841. He died in 1845. By a second wife his son in law John Gurdon inherited, who also took the name of Rebow. He died in 1870. His son was Hector John Gurdon Rebow, from whom William Leslie Moore, the present owner, bought Smallfield Place in 1898.

=== Burstow Lodge ===
This 15th century timber framed-above and whitewashed brick cladding-below medieval hall house has a Grade II* (Note: A Grade of Listing in the UK relates to (architecture)) listing. A moat surrounds with small bridge to the front.

See manors above for further history.

== Culture and community ==
On an end wall of Centenary Hall in Wheelers Lane (erected in 1994 and marking the centenary of Burstow Parish Council), there are mosaics designed and made by local residents. These celebrate some of the rich variety of places, events and activities that have gone to make up Burstow, Smallfield and Keepers Corner.

Many of the local clubs and societies, old-established and new, contribute to the strong community spirit that exists in the village.

=== Heatherley Cheshire Home ===
In the south a Leonard Cheshire disability nursing home opened in 1961 set in 17 acres (6.9 ha) is within the parish. This has forty single rooms, the Leonard Cheshire foundation's mission to provide conditions necessary for their physical, mental and spiritual well-being of disabled people.

=== Sport ===
Smallfield Football Club is the only football club in the parish, a successful amateur team competing in county leagues at senior and junior level. They won the Redhill & District Saturday Football League and Surrey County FA – Junior Cup for 2010–11 and a Senior Cup again in the 2011–2012 season.

Smallfield Cricket Club plays at the same Plough Road Ground as the Football Club above. They play two teams in the Mid-Sussex League, 1st team in division 2 and 2nd team in division 5, and a friendly side playing mainly Sundays. It has web-based administration.

The football and cricket clubs form the Smallfield Sports Association who lease the ground from Tandridge District Council and run the facilities at the ground and in the pavilion which was totally refurbished in 1999.

Smallfield Raceway, an oval-shaped dirt track, has staged banger racing since the late 1970s.

== Local government ==
3 councillors sit on Tandridge District Council, who are:

| Election | Member | Ward |
|---|---|---|
| 2022 | Sue Farr | Burstow, Horne & Outwood |
| 2019 | Colin White | Burstow, Horne & Outwood |
| 2021 | Mick Gillman | Burstow, Horne & Outwood |

Smallfield is part of the Lingfield division on Surrey County Council. It is represented by Lesley Steeds of the Conservative group.

== Transport ==
=== Roads ===
Smallfield is east of Gatwick Airport and the M23 motorway, 7.5 miles (12.1 km) southwest of Oxted and 1.8 miles (2.9 km) east of Horley.

A junction of the M23 motorway is 2 miles (3.2 km) west at Gatwick.

==== History of development of roads ====
All the original tracks in the area ran north–south – for example, the lanes to Outwood and Bletchingley/Blechingley – so they tend to be narrow and winding. The east–west roads tend to be wider and straighter as they were not constructed until much later – a narrow humpback bridge built over Burstow Stream saw many cars bump until it was replaced in the mid-1960s.

=== Rail ===
Car parking at Horley station is at £6.50 at the time of writing for 24 hours. No more than 80 spaces exist therefore giving relatively limited railside car parking working on a first-come, first-served basis.

2011 Census Homes
| Output area | Detached | Semi-detached | Terraced | Flats and apartments | Caravans/temporary/mobile homes | shared between households |
|---|---|---|---|---|---|---|
| (Civil Parish) | 842 | 507 | 218 | 144 | 73 | 0 |

The average level of accommodation in the region composed of detached houses was 28%, the average that was apartments was 22.6%.

2011 Census Key Statistics
| Output area | Population | Households | % Owned outright | % Owned with a loan | hectares |
|---|---|---|---|---|---|
| (Civil Parish) | 4,333 | 1,784 | 38.4% | 39.8% | 1,139 |

The proportion of households in the civil parish who owned their home outright compares to the regional average of 35.1%. The proportion who owned their home with a loan compares to the regional average of 32.5%. The remaining % is made up of rented dwellings (plus a negligible % of households living rent-free).

== Other notable residents ==
- John Flamsteed, Astronomer and Rector of Burstow.
- Matthieu Hartley, born in Burstow, member of the band The Cure 1979–80.
- Robert Shearman, Writer of Dark Fantasy and Doctor Who, attended Burstow School.

== See also ==
- List of places of worship in Tandridge (district)

== Notes and references ==
Notes
