= Tarring Neville =

Village and civil parish in East Sussex, England

Coordinates: 50.82°N 0.05°E

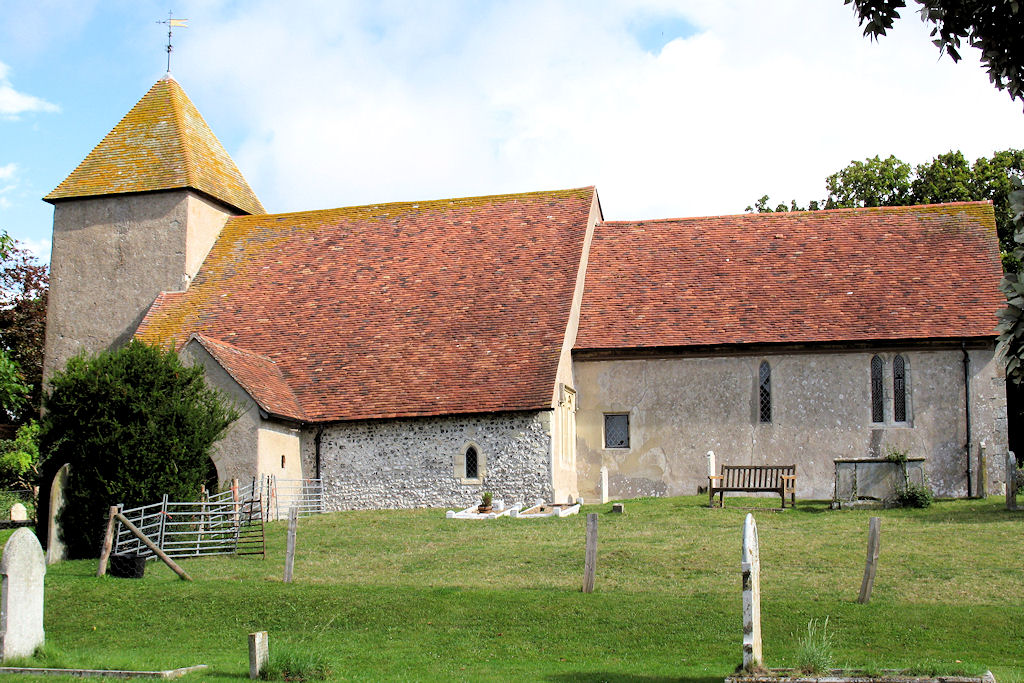
- St Mary's Church

- Location within East Sussex
- Area: 1.56 sq mi (4.0 km^{2})
- Population: 36 (Parish-1971)
  - Density: 23/sq mi (8.9/km^{2})
- OS grid reference: TQ442037
  - London: 48 miles (77 km) N
- Civil parish: Tarring Neville
- District: Lewes
- Shire county: East Sussex
- Region: South East
- Country: England
- Sovereign state: United Kingdom
- Post town: NEWHAVEN
- Postcode district: BN9
- Dialling code: 01273
- Police: Sussex
- Fire: East Sussex
- Ambulance: South East Coast
- UK Parliament: Lewes

Tarring Neville is a village and civil parish in the Lewes district of East Sussex, England. The village is located five miles (8 km) south of Lewes, on the A26 road to Newhaven. The south west border of the parish runs along the River Ouse, the parish extending into the South Downs. In 1971 the parish had a population of 36.

== Landmarks ==
The parish church, dedicated to St Mary, is a Grade I listed building. It was built in the 13th century and has a 14th-century font. Two other Grade II listed buildings, the Manor Farmhouse and associated barn, are within the parish.

== Governance ==
On a local level, the parish is governed with a Parish meeting although there have been no representations in recent years.

The next level of government is the district council. The parish of Tarring Neville lies within the Ouse Valley and Ringmer ward of Lewes District Council, which returns three seats to the council.

East Sussex County Council is the next tier of government, for which Tarring Neville is within the Ouse Valley East division, with responsibility for Education, Libraries, Social Services, Civil Registration, Trading Standards and Transport. Elections for the County Council are held every four years.

The UK Parliament constituency for Tarring Neville is Lewes. The Liberal Democrat Norman Baker served as the constituency MP from 1997 until 2015, when Conservative Maria Caulfield was elected. As of July 2024 Liberal Democrat James MacCleary is the MP.

Prior to Brexit in 2020, Tarring Neville was represented by the South-East England constituency, in the European Parliament.

== Name ==
Tarring is believed to be derived from either Tare(tar) ing(fort or stronghold) or Torr(Tower) ing(fort or stronghold) so it translates to the Tar Fort or Tower Fort. The most likely explanation for this name is to mean that this was where ships were waterproofed with tar.

The place names ending in ing, inge or ings were usually found on higher ground, or in places which control strategic points, and appear to surround areas first settled by the Saxons.

The Neville suffix was added after the Norman Conquest of England in 1066, when the Neville family took ownership of the village.

== Commerce ==
South of the village, along the A26 road, is the Tarring Neville chalk quarry. The quarry produces high quality chalk used locally for the manufacture of plaster. The quarry has reserves to last until 2019.
