= John Gage (Tudor politician) =

English courtier and politician (1479–1556)

The Right Honourable Sir John Gage KG
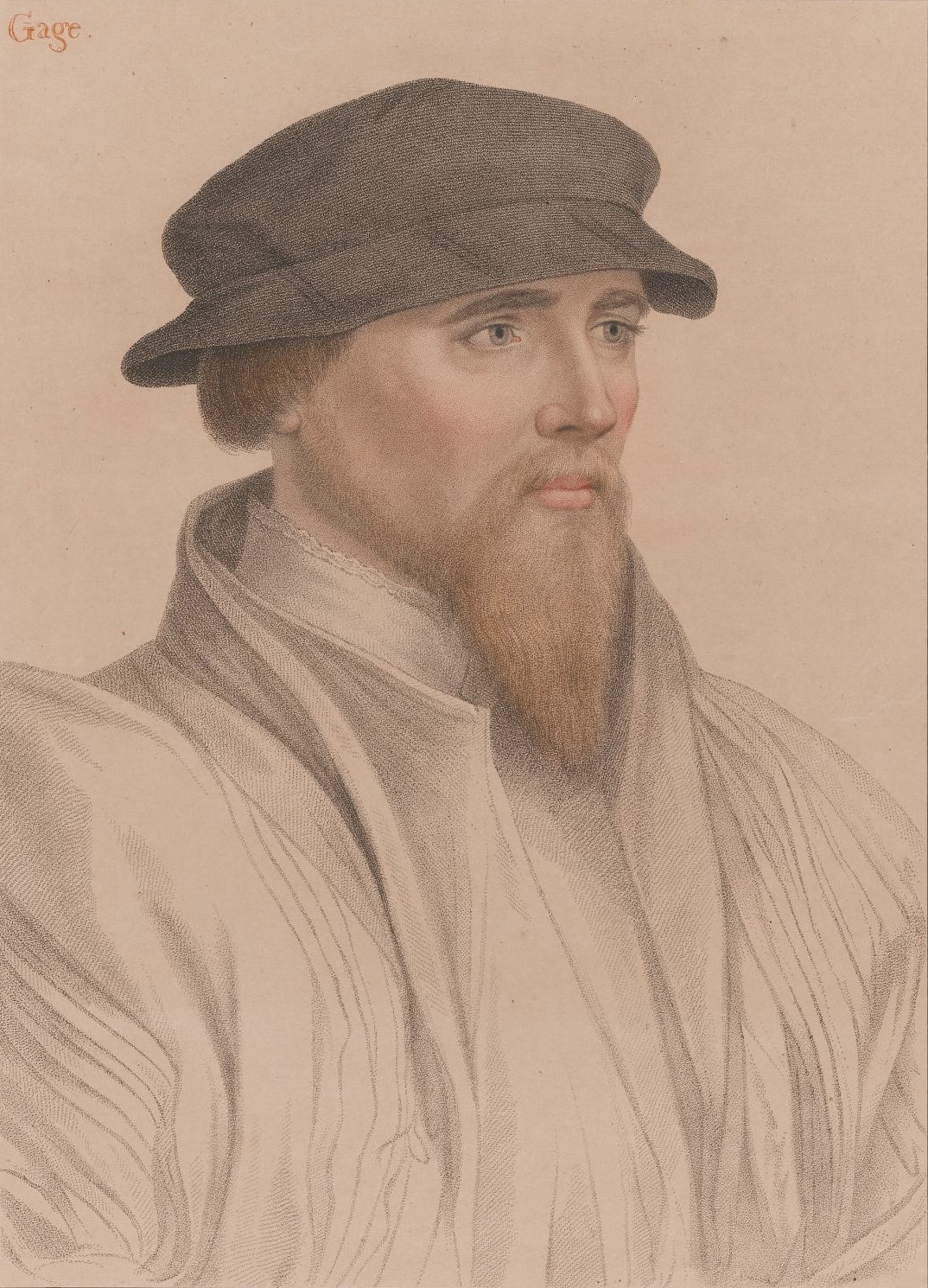
- Portrait of Sir John Gage, by Hans Holbein the Younger (c. 1535–1540)

Lord Chamberlain
- In office 1553–1556
- Monarch: Mary I
- Preceded by: The Lord Darcy of Chiche
- Succeeded by: Sir Edward Hastings

Personal details
- Born: 28 October 1479 Burstow, Surrey, England
- Died: 18 April 1556 (aged 76) Firle Place, East Sussex, England
- Resting place: Firle, East Sussex, England
- Spouse: Philippa Guildford
- Occupation: Courtier

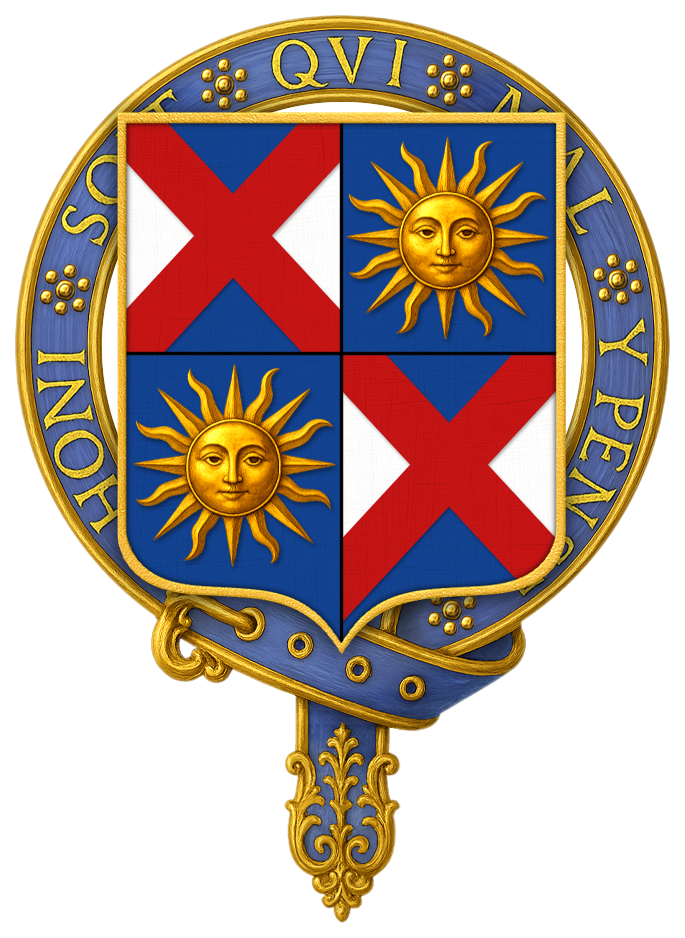
Garter-encircled arms of Sir John Gage, KG: Quarterly 1st and 4th Per saltire Azure and Argent a saltire Gules for Gage; 2nd and 3rd Azure a sun in its splendour Or for St Clere.

Sir John Gage (28 October 1479 – 18 April 1556) was an English courtier during the Tudor period. He held a number of offices, including Chancellor of the Duchy of Lancaster (1542–1547), Comptroller of the Household (1540–1547), Constable of the Tower (1540–1556) and Lord Chamberlain (1553–1556).

== Early life and family ==
John Gage was born on 28 October 1479 at Burstow manor in Surrey and baptized at the parish church there on the same day. He was the only son of William Gage and Agnes Bolney.

He married Philippa Guildford, daughter of Sir Richard Guildford, on 14 April 1502. They were the parents of eight children:

- Sir Edward Gage - married Elizabeth, daughter of John Parker and also Joan, daughter of Sir Richard Sackville.
- James Gage - married Jane, daughter of James Delves and widow of John Bellingham.
- Robert Gage - married Elizabeth, daughter of Nicholas Wilford.
- William Gage - died without issue.
- Alice Gage – married Sir Anthony Browne Jr.
- Ann Gage – married John Thatcher.
- Elizabeth Gage (d.1558) – married Sir John Jenyns (d.1547), a courtier who served as Master of the Office of Ordnance for Boulogne.
- Cicily Gage - married Sir George Baynham.

== Career ==
An Esquire of the Body to both Henry VII and Henry VIII, he served offices in the Pale of Calais, becoming Comptroller in 1524. After receiving a knighthood in 1525, he moved to the post of Vice-Chamberlain of the Household in 1526, leaving court in 1533. He also represented Sussex three times (1529, 1539 and 1542) in the parliaments of Henry VIII.

He remained active, attending, in 1537, the baptism of Prince Edward and the funeral of Jane Seymour. He returned to favour, and 1540 saw his appointment as Comptroller of the Household, Constable of the Tower and as a Privy Counsellor. In his role as Constable of the Tower, he supervised the arrangements for the execution of Catherine Howard.

In 1541 he became a Knight of the Garter and in 1542 he succeeded as Chancellor of the Duchy of Lancaster. In 1544 he undertook an important role for the invasion of France, organising transport and supplies for the army, and he became a knight banneret.

Present at the funeral of Henry VIII, he was appointed one of the executors of the king's will and a member of Edward VI's Regency Council. Differences soon arose between him and The Duke of Somerset, who expelled him from the council and from his posts of Comptroller and Chancellor when he became Lord Protector in 1547. He re-joined the council, before resigning upon the accession to power of The Earl of Warwick, later Duke of Northumberland. He was suspended as Constable for not supporting Northumberland's attempt to install Lady Jane Grey as Edward's successor. The accession of Mary I saw his restoration as Constable and appointment as Lord Chamberlain. He bore her train at her coronation and at her marriage to Philip of Spain. As Constable, he guarded Princess Elizabeth in 1555; he was described by Heylyn as "her bitter enemy, but more for love of the Pope than for hate of her person".

== Death ==
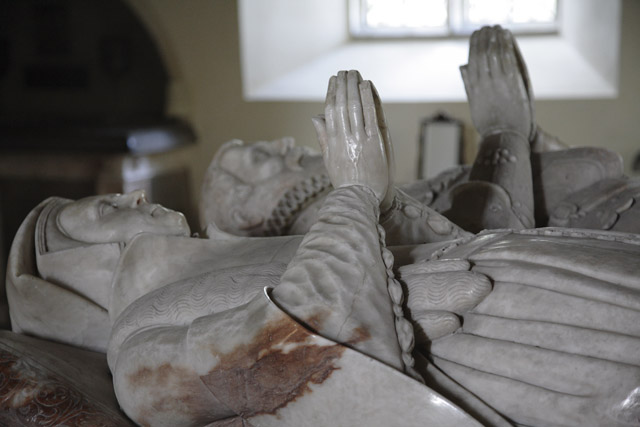
Effigy of Sir John Gage and Philippa Guildford

Gage died at his house, Firle Place, on 18 April 1556, and was buried on 25 April at the Church of St Peter in Firle next to his wife. Their alabaster altar tomb in the north chapel of that church is the work of Gerard Johnson the elder (1541–1611) and, along with monuments for some other members of their family, was erected in about 1595.

His will, made on 20 February 1555/6, was proved at the Prerogative Court of Canterbury on 10 June 1556. A lengthy and detailed household inventory was added as a schedule to the will and points to the wealth and lifestyle that Sir John enjoyed. An introduction and transcription of the inventory has been published.

== Bibliography ==
There does not appear to be a biography of Sir John Gage in the form of a book. However, the following lengthy and profusely referenced article provides extensive information about him and discusses his role in contemporary public life:

- Potter, David (2002). "Sir John Gage, Tudor Courtier and Soldier (1479-1556)". The English Historical Review. 117 (474): 1109–1146. doi:10.1093/ehr/117.474.1109.

Political offices
| Preceded by The Lord Sandys | Vice-Chamberlain of the Household; 1526–1533 | Unknown Next known title holder: Sir William Kingston |
| Preceded by Sir William Kingston | Comptroller of the Household; 1540–1547 | Succeeded by Sir William Paget |
| Preceded by Sir William Kingston | Constable of the Tower; 1540–1556 | Unknown |
| Preceded by The Earl of Southampton | Chancellor of the Duchy of Lancaster; 1542–1547 | Succeeded by Sir William Paget |
| Preceded by The Lord Darcy of Chiche | Lord Chamberlain; 1553–1556 | Unknown Next known title holder: Sir Edward Hastings |
