= Hedgecourt =

Site of Special Scientific Interest in Surrey

Coordinates: 51.146°N 0.064°W

- Site of Special Scientific Interest
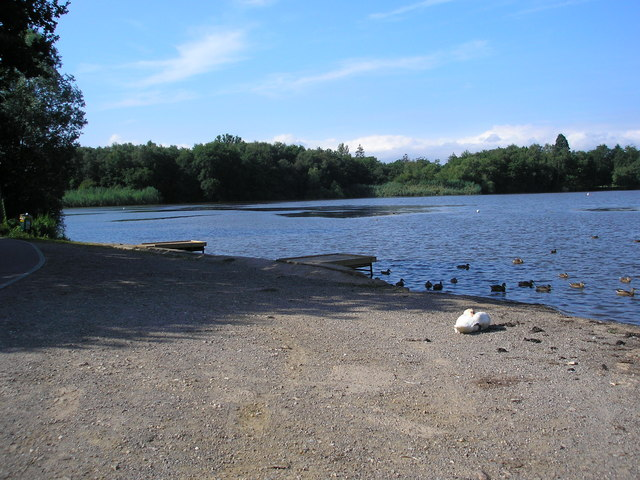
- Location of Hedgecourt.
- Area of search: Surrey
- Grid reference: TQ 355 403
- Interest: Biological
- Area: 33.6 hectares (83 acres)
- Notification date: 1986
- Location map: Magic Map

Hedgecourt is a 33.6-hectare (83-acre) biological Site of Special Scientific Interest (SSSI) north of Felbridge in Surrey. An area of 5 ha (12 acres) is managed by the Surrey Wildlife Trust.

Hedgecourt Lake is an ancient mill pond formed by damming the Eden Brook, a tributary of the River Eden. Other habitats are fen, grassland and woodland. There are wetland breeding birds such as water rail, mute swan, sedge warbler, kingfisher and tufted duck.

Hedgecourt Mill, a flour mill at the east end of Hedgecourt Lake, is thought to have been built at the start of the 16th century. It had closed by 1926 and little evidence of the building remains.

== Description ==
Map of Hedgecourt SSSI showing the sites of Wire Mill (1) and Hedgecourt Mill (2)

Hedgecourt SSSI is a wetland site in southeast Surrey in the Eden Brook valley. It sits on a layer of alluvial deposits, which overlies the Tunbridge Wells Sands beneath. The largest part of the site is Hedgecourt Lake, a former mill pond. Its primary inflow and outflow are the Eden Brook and it has a catchment area of 9.73 km^{2} (3.76 sq mi), of which around 60% is agricultural land and 23% is urban. The surface area is 17.2 ha (43 acres), the maximum depth is 1.25 m (4 ft 1 in) and the mean hydraulic residence time is 83 days.

The lake, in the Metropolitan Green Belt, is owned by a local yacht club, which uses it for sailing. A local angling club stocks the waters with fish and Surrey Wildlife Trust rents 5 ha (12 acres) at the west end as a nature reserve. A 1995 survey noted that the lake was shallow and subject to silting. A 2017 report described the lake as being in poor condition with high levels of phosphate. Aquatic plants characteristic of hyper-eutrophic conditions, such as Stuckenia pectinata, Potamogeton pusillus and Zannichellia palustris, were found to be abundant.

Surrounding the lake and still in the SSSI are areas of woodland, dominated by oak and birch, with hazel and alder. On the marshier ground close to the lake, alder, birch and grey sallow are common. Where the ground is waterlogged, species such as marsh horsetail, yellow loosestrife, reed canary-grass, gipsywort, meadowsweet and meadow thistle are found. Aquatic flora include Elodea nuttallii, broad-leaved pondweed and white water-lily. Fish species include bream, roach, tench, pike, perch and eels.

== History ==
The earliest surviving record of Hedgecourt is from 1302, when it appears as Hegecurt. In later documents from the 14th century, it is written as Le Heggecurt and Heggecourt. In the late 15th and early 16th centuries it is recorded as Hegecote. The name is of French origin and dates from after the Norman Conquest.

Until the start of the 14th century, Hedgecourt was part of the Manor of Horne. In 1302, it was granted to John de Berewyk, but was briefly returned to the Crown in 1323-4, before being regranted to Roger de Husee, de Berewyk's heir. During the 15th century, the land came into the possession of John Gage, whose descendants held the manor until the death of William Gage in 1744. It then passed through a succession of private owners, who progressively broke up the estate.

The first watermill is thought to have been a hammer mill on the current Wire Mill site, beyond the northeastern end of the SSSI. The date of construction is unknown, but there was an active iron industry in the area in the 14th century and there was a forge operating at Hedgecourt in the 16th century. A major reconstruction took place c. 1573 and timber from a former man-of-war ship was used in the rebuilding. On maps published between 1729 and 1823, the mill is recorded as "Woodcock Hammer".

By 1888, the hammer mill had become a wire mill. Local legend holds that the mill supplied nails for St Paul's Cathedral in the late 18th century. The mill, still referred to as the "Wire Mill", was converted to a flour mill in 1816 and closed completely in 1912. Following the First World War, the building was used by a fishing club, but became an inn in 1934. It was bought by McGuran and Quest Inns Ltd in the summer of 1987, but during refurbishment works the following March, a fire caused extensive damage. The pub reopened on 2 September 1988. In October 2022, it was sold to the brewer, Hall & Woodhouse.

The first mill on the Hedgecourt Mill site, is thought to have been built at the start of the 16th century. It is believed to have been positioned directly on the Eden Brook and to have been powered by an undershot water wheel. Hedgecourt Lake was created c. 1562 – c. 1567 by damming the brook, primarily to provide an additional store of water for the hammer mill on the Wire Mill site. At the same time, Hedgecourt Mill was converted to become an overshot mill.

During the reign of Elizabeth I, Hedgecourt Mill was described as a corn mill and it is marked on a map of 1679, published by the hydrographer, John Seller. In the late 17th century, Hedgecourt Mill is thought to have had two pairs of millstones and a water wheel that was 12 ft 6 in (3.81 m) in diameter and 6 ft (1.8 m) wide. The mill had closed by 1926 and the building quickly became ruinous. In the early 1990s, it was possible to see the framework of the iron water wheel attached to the rotting wooden axel shaft. The original mill house, parts of which date from the 17th century, was Grade II-listed in 1984.

Hedgecourt was designated a Site of Special Scientific Interest in 1975. The main lake was purchased by Crawley Mariners Yacht Club in 1977; the cost was part-funded by a £10,000 grant from the National Sports Council. The author, Frederick Forsyth, owned Lake House in the mid-1980s; the property has a private jetty and slipway onto the lake. In 1986, Surrey Wildlife Trust began to lease the western part of the lake as a nature reserve. A scrub cutter machine was presented to the trust by National Grid in 1996. An algal bloom, in 1999, reduced oxygen levels in the water and there were reports of dead and distressed fish.

== See also ==
- Medway watermills (upper tributaries)
